= Mary Printz =

American answering service operator

Mary Printz (April 8, 1923 – February 21, 2009) was an answering service operator who catered to many of the New York theater and business A-list in the 1950s. Bells Are Ringing, a Broadway musical, was based on her career, which was turned into the 1960 film of the same name.

== Biography ==
Born Mary Selina Horn in Grosse Pointe, Michigan on April 8, 1923, she was raised in Hampton, Virginia and became afflicted with polio as a five-year-old. She moved to New York City after dropping out of college and a failed marriage. There she married cocktail pianist Bob Printz in 1953 and found a night job at an answering service to match her husband's evening schedule.

=== Bells Are Ringing ===
The service she worked for was used by many of the city's professionals and people in show business, and Printz was noted for her ability to serve her clients, going beyond just listening to her customers to the point where she would pick up their laundry, walk their dog or water their plants, whatever was necessary.

Adolph Green, one of her clients, based the Broadway musical play Bells Are Ringing on Printz's situation, with book and lyrics by himself and Betty Comden and music by Jule Styne. In his review in The New York Times, Brooks Atkinson described Judy Holliday's character Ella Peterson as "an original subject - a telephone answering service that leads into the personal lives of several people. This is how the dream girl played by Miss Holliday meets her sweetheart, and brings a number of other bizarre people together". The original production ran from 1956 to 1959, with songs such as "The Party's Over" and "Just in Time" that have become standards. Both Holliday and co-star Sydney Chaplin won Tony Awards for their performances.

The play was made into a 1960 film version directed by Vincente Minnelli, starring Judy Holliday, who reprised her stage role, and Dean Martin.

=== Belles Celebrity Answering Service ===
Printz established the Belles Celebrity Answering Service in 1956, the same year the Broadway play opened, getting up at 4 a.m. in order to be able to arrive at the switchboard to make wake up calls that started as early as 5 a.m. There, Printz provided her customers with services that went beyond messages. Starting with Hermione Gingold, who was on the calling end of Printz's first message, her clients included Candice Bergen, Shirley MacLaine, Robert Redford, Burt Reynolds, Brooke Shields, Liz Smith, Spencer Tracy, Kathleen Turner, Tennessee Williams, as well as members of the rock band Kiss. She once received a call from Noël Coward who was panicked after draining the last out of a bottle of Scotch on Sunday when liquor stores were closed. Printz had her husband pick up a bottle from a cooperative bartender and had him deliver it to Coward at his building, solving yet one more crisis.

By the late 1960s, the company had 300 business and theatrical customers, but was running into problems with phone company service on the Plaza 8 exchange it used that served the area around East 50th Street in Manhattan. A spike in demand for telephone calls resulted in the PLaza 8 exchange being out of service for periods of time around June 1969. A client who called the phone company to complain about her inability to contact "the Belles" was told to contract with an alternate service "not on PL 8".

The firm had as many as 600 clients at its peak by the late 1970s, with over 20 operators at six switchboards. Celebrities and the well-off were the company's mainstay, all of whom came by referral, as the company did not advertise. Leonard Bernstein called to use the company's service, saying "This is Lenny. Adolph asked me to call you". Printz would not take business from physicians or repairmen, saying "It's too much trouble for the girls".

Though the advent of the answering machine cut into her business, Printz remained at the company until her death, by which time the service still had about 90 customers, including Woody Allen, Stephen Sondheim and Steven Spielberg.

The Belles service continues (without the "Celebrity" in its name and considerably modernized), currently run by Roger Snyder, who bought the business in 2009.

=== Death ===
Printz died at age 85 on February 21, 2009 at her home in Tappan, New York due to congestive heart failure, which was related to post-polio syndrome. She was survived by her husband, two sons and a granddaughter.
