= Jonathan Oppenheim (film editor) =

American film editor (1952–2020)

- Born: Jonathan Louis Oppenheim; November 10, 1952; Manhattan, New York, U.S.
- Died: July 16, 2020 (aged 67); New York City, U.S
- Resting place: Mount Carmel Cemetery
- Occupations: Film and television editor, producer, writer
- Spouse: Josie Oppenheim
- Children: 1
- Parent(s): David Oppenheim; Judy Holliday

Jonathan Louis Oppenheim (November 10, 1952 – July 16, 2020) was an American film and television editor, producer, and writer.

== Biography ==
The son of Judy Holliday, an actress, and David Oppenheim, a clarinetist and television producer, Oppenheim was mainly employed on documentary films. He was known for his work on The Oath (2010) and Paris Is Burning (1990). He edited over 24 films as well as being a story consultant and writer on many others. Oppenheim was a fellow, and a continual and long term mentor and advisor, at the Sundance Institute's Documentary Edit and Story Laboratory.

He was married to Josie Oppenheim, a psychoanalyst who was a relative of Stella Adler, and they had one daughter.

Oppenheim died from brain cancer on July 16, 2020, aged 67. He was interred at Mount Carmel Cemetery in Queens.

The Jonathan Oppenheim Editing Award commemorates him.

== Partial filmography ==
Year	Title	Role
1984	Streetwise	Associate editor
1990	Paris Is Burning	Editor
1998	Arguing the World	Editor
2001	Children Underground	Coeditor
2004	Out of the Shadow	Editor, coproducer
2009	Strongman	Coeditor
2010	The Oath	Editor, coproducer
