= Strongman (disambiguation) =

A strongman is a person who performs feats of strength.

Strongman or Strong Man may also refer to:

- Political strongman, a term for an authoritarian political leader, usually head of a military dictatorship
- Strongman game, a physical strength carnival attraction also known as a high striker
- Strongman (character), a Marvel Comics character
- Jon Andersen (born 1972), professional wrestler also known by the ring names Jon Strongman and Strong Man
- Strongman Mine, a New Zealand coal-mine
- Strong Man, one of The Mighty Heroes in the U.S. animated television series
- The Strong Man, a 1926 American silent film
- Strongman (film), a documentary movie about Stanley Pleskun
- Strongmen, a 2020 book by Ruth Ben-Ghiat
- Strongman (rapper), a Ghanaian rapper

== People with the surname ==
- Steve Strongman, Canadian blues guitarist, singer and songwriter
- William Gerald Strongman (1936–2021), Canadian politician

== See also ==
- Strength athletics, also known as Strongman competitions
