= The Christmas Album (Leslie Odom Jr. album) =

Studio album by Leslie Odom Jr.
- Released: November 6, 2020
- Genre: Christmas
- Label: S-Curve Records

The Christmas Album (2020) is the fourth studio album and second Christmas album by American actor and singer Leslie Odom Jr. It was released on November 6, 2020, by S-Curve Records. The album features interpretations of traditional holiday standards alongside original songs.

The album received generally positive reviews from critics.

== Background ==
The Christmas Album was released as the final album in Odom Jr.'s four-album recording agreement with S-Curve Records, which began in 2016. and Odom's second Christmas music album, after Simply Christmas.

== Track listing ==
No.	Title	Length
1.	"Snow"	3:18
2.	"Last Christmas"	3:31
3.	"Little Drummer Boy" (featuring Mzansi Youth Choir)	3:23
4.	"Winter Song" (featuring Cynthia Erivo)	3:44
5.	"It's Beginning to Look a Lot Like Christmas"	3:45
6.	"O Holy Night"	2:48
7.	"Ma'oz Tzur"	3:51
8.	"Mele Kalikimaka" (featuring The Walls Group and Michea Walls)	2:54
9.	"Auld Lang Syne"	1:45
10.	"Heaven & Earth"	3:29
