= Leslie Odom Jr. (album) =

2014 album by Leslie Odom Jr.

Studio album by Leslie Odom Jr.
- Released: August 12, 2014
- Recorded: April 2013–February 2014; 2016
- Genre: Jazz
- Length: 35:12
- Label: Self-released; S-Curve
- Producer: Steve Greenberg

Leslie Odom Jr. chronology
Leslie Odom Jr. (2014)	Simply Christmas (2016)

Leslie Odom Jr. is the self-titled debut studio album by actor and singer Leslie Odom Jr. An early version of the album, recorded prior to Odom's success in the 2015 Broadway musical Hamilton, was self-released in 2014. After Odom was signed to S-Curve Records in 2016, an expanded and revised version of the album was recorded. Released by in June 2016, it reached number one on the US Top Jazz Albums chart.

== Background ==
Odom started a Kickstarter page for the album, raising $40,791 for the project. Recording began in April 2013 and ended in February 2014. The slow recording process was due to Odom's busy schedule, which included his off-Broadway show Venice, his starring role on Smash, and his recurring roles on Person of Interest and Law & Order: Special Victims Unit. After multiple promotional concerts at The Public Theater, the album was released through CD Baby on August 12, 2014.

In 2016, as a result of his then-current role in the hit Broadway musical Hamilton, Odom was signed to a four-album deal with S-Curve Records He and producer Steve Greenberg narrowed down 200 potential tunes to ten tracks, and Odom recorded an updated and improved version of Leslie Odom Jr. during days off and afternoons before Broadway performances, in order to release the album before Odom left Hamilton. Six tracks were kept for the new version, and three songs – "Sarah", "Song for the Asking", and "Wild Is the Wind" – were cut. Four new songs were added, with changes to the track order.

== Promotion ==
One of the newly recorded songs for the 2026 reissue, "Autumn Leaves", was released as a single before the album came out. Odom toured to promote the album, performing concerts backed by a five-piece jazz quintet that includes a drummer, percussionist, bassist, guitarist, and a pianist who is also Odom's musical director.

== Critical reception ==
The album received positive reviews. David Clarke of BroadwayWorld wrote, "Fans and newcomers alike can revel in the glory of his decadently jazzy debut solo album, and after just one listen, I'm sure that you'll be hooked... There is a crisp smoothness to Leslie Odom Jr.'s voice that is entirely fascinating, and his self-titled debut album puts his instrument on full display." AllMusic editor Marcy Donelson described Leslie Odom Jr. as a "set of graceful vocal jazz interpretations of show tunes and popular song."

== Commercial performance ==
Released on June 10, 2016, the album debuted and peaked at number 147 on the US Billboard 200 and reached the top spot on the US Top Jazz Albums chart.

== Track listing ==
Leslie Odom Jr. track listing
No.	Title	Writer(s)	Length
1.	"Look for the Silver Lining" (from the musical, Sally)	Jerome Kern; B.G. DeSylva	4:21
2.	"Joey, Joey, Joey" (from the musical, The Most Happy Fella)	Frank Loesser	4:16
3.	"Cheer Up Charlie" (from Willy Wonka)	Leslie Bricusse; Anthony Newley	3:30
4.	"Love Look Away" (from the musical, Flower Drum Song)	Oscar Hammerstein II; Richard Rodgers	2:56
5.	"The Guilty Ones" (from Spring Awakening)	Duncan Sheik; Steven Sater	2:42
6.	"I Know That You Know" (featuring ELEW) (from the musical Oh, Please)	Vincent Youmans; Anne Caldwell	4:25
7.	"Sarah" (from the musical The Civil War)	Frank Wildhorn; Jack Murphy	4:21
8.	"Song for the Asking"	Paul Simon; Art Garfunkel; Roy Halee	2:53
9.	"Wild Is the Wind"	Dimitri Tiomkin; Ned Washington	6:09
Total length:			35:12

2016 reissue track listing
No.	Title	Writer(s)	Length
1.	"Look for the Silver Lining" (from the musical Sally)	Kern; DeSylva	4:22
2.	"Joey, Joey, Joey" (from the musical The Most Happy Fella)	Loesser	4:15
3.	"Autumn Leaves"	Joseph Kosma; Jacques Prévert; Johnny Mercer	3:11
4.	"Brazil"	Ary Barroso	2:44
5.	"Love Look Away" (from the musical Flower Drum Song)	Hammerstein; Rodgers	2:59
6.	"Nobody Knows You When You're Down and Out"	Jimmy Cox	3:20
7.	"The Guilty Ones" (from the musical Spring Awakening)	Sheik; Sater	2:43
8.	"I Know That You Know" (featuring ELEW) (from the musical Oh, Please)	Youmans; Caldwell	4:23
9.	"Cheer Up Charlie" (from Willy Wonka and the Chocolate Factory)	Leslie Bricusse; Anthony Newley	2:45
10.	"The Party's Over" (from the musical Bells Are Ringing)	Jule Styne; Betty Comden; Adolph Green	3:12
Total length:			33:53

== Charts ==
Weekly chart performance for Leslie Odom Jr.
Chart (2016)	Peak position
US Billboard 200	147
US Top Jazz Albums (Billboard)	1

== Release history ==
Leslie Odom Jr. release history
Region	Date	Edition(s)	Format(s)	Label(s)	Ref.
Various	August 12, 2014	Standard	CD; digital download	Self-released	
Various	June 10, 2016	Reissue	CD; digital download	S-Curve Records	
