= Just in Time (song) =

1956 popular song

Single by Tony Bennett
- B-side: "The Autumn Waltz"
- Released: October 8, 1956
- Recorded: September 19, 1956
- Studio: Columbia 30th Street Studio, New York City
- Genre: Jazz
- Length: 2:32
- Label: Columbia
- Songwriters: Jule Styne, Betty Comden and Adolph Green

Tony Bennett singles chronology
"From the Candy Store on the Corner to the Chapel on the Hill" (1956)	"Just in Time" (1956)	"Sold to the Man With the Broken Heart" (1957)

"Just in Time" is a popular song with the melody written by Jule Styne and the lyrics by Betty Comden and Adolph Green. It was introduced by Judy Holliday and Sydney Chaplin in the musical Bells Are Ringing in 1956. Judy Holliday and Dean Martin sang the song in the 1960 film of Bells Are Ringing. Martin then recorded it for his 1960 album, This Time I'm Swingin'!. Tony Bennett recorded the song in 1956 and continued performing it until his retirement, at Radio City Music Hall, in 2021 at the age of 95.

== Recorded versions ==
- Peggy Lee recorded "Just in Time" in 1958 on Jump for Joy.
- Blossom Dearie recorded the song in 1959 on Blossom Dearie Sings Comden and Green.
- A recording of the song made by Tony Bennett on September 19, 1956 was a minor hit in 1956.
- Lena Horne - on Give the Lady What She Wants (1958)
- Frank Sinatra - for his album Come Dance with Me! (1959)
- Shirley Horn – for her debut album, Embers and Ashes (1960)
- Eddie Fisher included the song on his 1961 LP of Broadway musical tunes entitled Tonight with Eddie Fisher.
- Nina Simone released multiple live recordings: on her album Nina at the Village Gate (1962) and also Nina Simone: The Montreux Years (2001). The latter recording was featured in the film Before Sunset.
- Sarah Vaughan on her album Sarah + 2 (1962).
- Barbra Streisand included it in her album The Third Album (1964)
- Vic Godard and Subway Sect - for his album Songs for Sale (1982).
- Tony Bennett recorded it for a second time with Michael Bublé as part of his 2006 album Duets: An American Classic.
- Rickie Lee Jones - for the album Pieces of Treasure (2023)
- It was recorded in the 1960s by Judy Garland.
- Bobby Darin recorded the song in the 1961 sessions for You're the Reason I'm Living, but it was not included on that album, and would instead first be released on the 1995 compilation Great Gentlemen Of Song: Spotlight On Bobby Darin. This song inspired the title of the 2025 musical of the same name starring Jonathan Groff, who later recorded the song as part of the original cast recording musical of the same name.

== Popular culture ==
- Singer actress Joan O'Brien turns in a rousing version of this song on a 1963 episode of the 1960s TV sitcom, The Dick Van Dyke Show.
- Before Sunset features a recording of the song by Nina Simone recorded at the Montreux Jazz Festival.
- The 2025 jukebox musical Just in Time starring Jonathan Groff is both named after and includes the song.
