= The Party's Over (1956 song) =

1956 musical theatre song

Single by Carmen McRae
- B-side: "I'm a Dreamer, Aren't We All"
- Published: 1956
- Released: October 1956
- Recorded: September 4, 1956
- Genre: Traditional pop
- Length: 2:50
- Label: Decca
- Composer: Jule Styne
- Lyricists: Betty Comden, Adolph Green

"The Party's Over" is a popular song composed by Jule Styne with lyrics by Betty Comden and Adolph Green. It was introduced in the 1956 musical comedy play Bells Are Ringing by Judy Holliday. For the 1960 film version, Holliday again performed the song.

According to the website SecondHandSongs, there have been almost 100 cover versions of "The Party's Over", including versions by Nat King Cole, Bobby Darin and Doris Day.

== Other notable versions ==
- Nat King Cole, on his 1957 album Just One Of Those Things.
- Stan Kenton, on his album The Stage Door Swings (1958).
- Shirley Bassey, on her first Columbia album The Fabulous Shirley Bassey (1959).
- Blossom Dearie on her album Blossom Dearie Sings Comden and Green (1959).
- Julie London, on her album Around Midnight (1960).
- Lonnie Donegan scored a hit on the UK singles chart in 1962 with his version, peaking at No. 9 during a 12 week run.
- Gene Ammons, on his Prestige Records album Late Hour Special (1961).
- Bobby Darin, as the last track on his eighth studio album, and debut for Capitol in 1962, Oh! Look at Me Now.
- Anita O'Day and Cal Tjader, on their Time for 2 album (1962).
- Lesley Gore, on her 1963 debut album I'll Cry If I Want To.
- Sammy Davis Jr., on The Shelter of Your Arms (1964)
- Robie Lester, as a single for the Interlude company in 1966.
- Judy Holliday and Gerry Mulligan on the album Holliday with Mulligan (1980).
- Michael Feinstein on his Michael Feinstein Sings the Jule Styne Songbook (1991)
- Leslie Odom Jr. ended his debut album Leslie Odom Jr. (album) (2016) with the song.
- Seth MacFarlane, on his fifth album Once in a While (2019).
