= Bells Are Ringing (film) =

1960 film directed by Vincente Minnelli

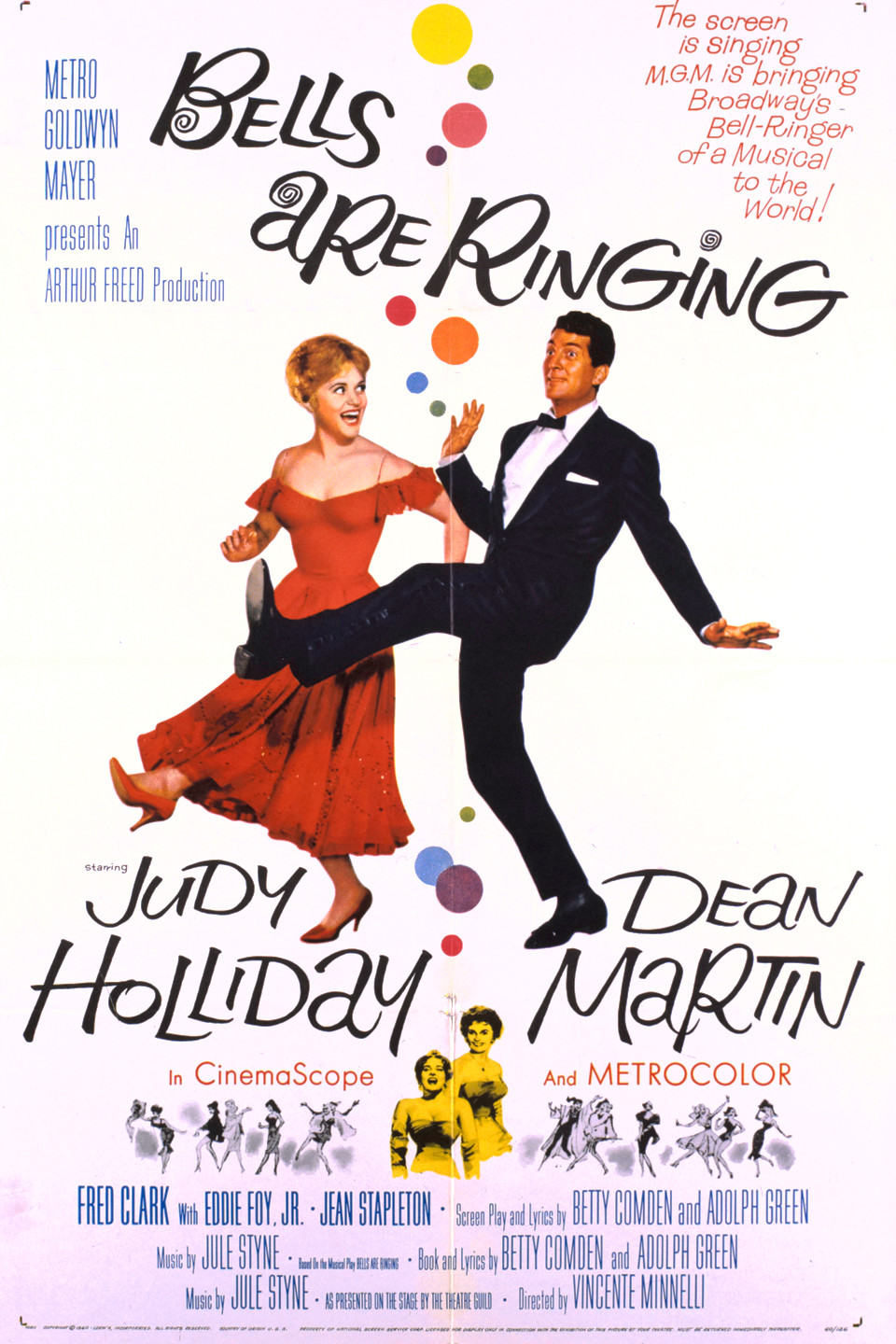
- Original poster
- Directed by: Vincente Minnelli
- Screenplay by: Betty Comden; Adolph Green; (screenplay and lyrics)
- Based on: Bells Are Ringing; 1956 musical by Betty Comden, Adolph Green and Jule Styne
- Produced by: Arthur Freed
- Starring: Judy Holliday; Dean Martin
- Cinematography: Milton Krasner
- Edited by: Adrienne Fazan
- Music by: Jule Styne; Music supervised and conducted by; André Previn
- Color process: Metrocolor
- Production company: An Arthur Freed Production
- Distributed by: Metro-Goldwyn-Mayer
- Release date: June 23, 1960
- Running time: 126 minutes
- Country: United States
- Language: English
- Budget: $3.2 million
- Box office: $3.6 million

Bells Are Ringing is a 1960 American romantic comedy-musical film directed by Vincente Minnelli and starring Judy Holliday and Dean Martin. Based on the successful 1956 Broadway production of the same name by Betty Comden, Adolph Green and Jule Styne, the film focuses on Ella Peterson, based on the life of Mary Printz, who works in the basement office of a telephone answering service.

== Plot ==
Ella Peterson works as a switchboard operator at the Susanswerphone answering service. She can't help breaking the rules by becoming overly involved in the lives of the subscribers. Some of the more peculiar ones include a dentist who exuberantly composes song lyrics on an air hose, an actor who emulates Marlon Brando and a little boy for whom she pretends to be Santa Claus.

Ella has a secret crush on the voice of subscriber Jeffrey Moss, an insecure playwright whose writing partner has left him and who has taken to drinking too much, for whom she plays a comforting motherly character. The producer of his play, The Midas Touch, leaves an ultimatum for Jeffrey that he must submit an installment of his play by an imminent deadline or lose the job. Drunk and dispirited, Jeffrey has left his phone off the hook. Breaking the rules to meet Jeffrey in person, Ella pretends to be "Melisande Scott", stopping by his apartment to rouse Jeffrey for his meeting and convince him that he can be successful on his own. Through a series of manipulations, Ella introduces the playwright to the wishful actor and composer, who now have a chance to advance their career aspirations by contributing to The Midas Touch. Romantic sparks and confusions result.

A humorous subplot involves the courtly Otto, who convinces Susanswerphone to take orders for his "mail-order classical record business" known as Titanic Records. However, Otto is actually a bookie whose orders are a coded system for betting on horses. Unwittingly, Ella changes orders for the supposedly incorrect Beethoven's Tenth Symphony, Opus 6, not realizing she is changing bets.

Although the police begin to assume that Susanswerphone might be a front for an escort service, the plot ends happily, with Jeff proposing and Ella's wacky subscribers coming to thank her.

== Cast ==
Character names are not indicated in on-screen cast credits.

- Judy Holliday as Ella Peterson
- Dean Martin as Jeffrey Moss
- Fred Clark as Larry Hastings
- Eddie Foy Jr. as J. Otto Prantz
- Jean Stapleton as Sue
- Ruth Storey as Gwynne
- Dort Clark as Inspector Barnes
- Frank Gorshin as Blake Barton
- Ralph Roberts as Francis
- Valerie Allen as Olga
- Bernie West as Dr. Joe Kitchell
- Steven Peck as Gangster
- Gerry Mulligan as Ella's blind date
- Jean Moorhead as Party Guest (uncredited)

== Songs ==
Music by Jule Styne, lyrics by Betty Comden and Adolph Green

- "It's a Perfect Relationship"
- "Do it Yourself"
- "It's a Simple Little System"
- "Better Than a Dream"
- "I Met a Girl"
- "Just in Time”
- "Drop That Name"
- "The Party’s Over”
- "I'm Going Back"

== Production ==
Judy Holliday and Jean Stapleton reprised their stage roles for the film. Jazz musician Gerry Mulligan, Holliday's real-life ex-lover, plays her disastrous blind date in a cameo role. Bells Are Ringing was Holliday's final film.

Hal Linden appears, uncredited, in his first film appearance, singing 'The Midas Touch' in the nightclub act, wearing a gold lame suit. A friend of Holliday, he portrayed Jeff Moss with her in the Broadway play in 1958-1959.

Bells Are Ringing was also the final musical produced by the MGM "Freed Unit" headed by producer Arthur Freed, which had been responsible for many of the studio's greatest successes, including Meet Me in St. Louis (1944), Easter Parade (1948), On the Town (1949), An American in Paris (1951), Singin' in the Rain (1952) and Gigi (1958). The film marked the 13th and final collaboration between Freed and director Vincente Minnelli.

Several songs from the Broadway production were dropped or replaced, including "Salzburg", "Hello, Hello There", "On My Own" (replaced by "Do It Yourself"), "Long Before I Knew You" (replaced by "Better Than a Dream"), "Mu Cha Cha" (filmed but shortened) and "Is it a Crime?" (filmed, but cut before release). A new song for Dean Martin, "My Guiding Star", was also filmed but cut. The latter two songs have been released as extras on the Warner Home Video DVD. The soundtrack album was released by Capitol Records.

The row house used for exteriors stood at 215 East 68th Street, Manhattan, and had once been the residence of author Stephen Vincent Benet. It was a holdout from a row and was torn down in the early 1960s.

== Reception ==
In a contemporary review, critic Bosley Crowther of The New York Times was critical of the script but praised Holliday's performance: "[T]he jangled romance they have prepared for her to play is a poor thing, made up of one slight gimmick and a lot of surrounding gags. What Miss Holliday does with the latter is the measure of the quality of the show. ... You can take our word for it: 'Bells Are Ringing' owes more to Miss Holliday than to its authors, its director (Vincent Minnelli), or even to Alexander Graham Bell."

== Awards and nominations ==
Comden and Green won the Writers Guild of America award for Best American Musical. Together with Styne, they shared a Grammy Award nomination for Best Soundtrack Album or Recording of Original Cast from a Motion Picture or TV. Minnelli earned a Best Director nomination from the Directors Guild of America. André Previn was nominated for an Academy Award for Best Music, Scoring of a Musical Picture. At the 18th Annual Golden Globe Awards, the film was nominated for Best Film - Musical, and Holliday was nominated for Best Actress - Musical.

== Box-office ==
According to MGM records, the film earned $2,825,000 in the U.S. and Canada but only $800,000 elsewhere, losing a total of $1,720,000.
