= Adam Green (journalist) =

American journalist

Adam Green is an American journalist. He is Vogue magazine's theater critic. and a regular contributor to The New Yorker His work has also appeared in other publications, among them The New York Times. Before becoming a journalist, Green was a staff writer for Saturday Night Live; his other television credits include several comedy specials, among them a CBS tribute to Superman's 50th Anniversary. In the late 1980s, Green and Maura Moynihan formed the comedy duo Moynihan and Green. They performed in nightclubs around New York City and appeared in the Merchant-Ivory film Slaves of New York.

== Early life and education ==
Green is the son of Tony Award-winning actress Phyllis Newman and Broadway lyricist and playwright Adolph Green. He is the brother of singer-songwriter Amanda Green.

Green studied English literature at Harvard University, where he was an editor for the Harvard Lampoon.

== Bibliography ==
=== Essays and journalism ===
- Green, Adam (January 7, 2013). "Profiles: A Pickpocket's Tale". The New Yorker. Vol. 88, no. 42. pp. 38–47.
