= David Oppenheim (musician) =

American clarinetist, and classical music and television producer (1922–2007)

- Born: David Jerome Oppenheim; April 13, 1922; Detroit, Michigan, U.S.
- Died: November 14, 2007 (aged 85); New York City, U.S.
- Spouses: Judy Holliday (m. 1948; div. 1957) Ellen Adler (m. 1957; div. 1976) Patricia Jaffe (m. 1987)
- Children: 3, including Jonathan
- Relatives: Del Water Gap (grandson)

David Jerome Oppenheim (April 13, 1922 – November 14, 2007) was an American clarinetist, and classical music and television producer. Oppenheim directed the Masterworks division of Columbia Records from 1950 to 1959. During this time he worked with numerous major figures in the music world including Igor Stravinsky, with whom he formed a friendship, later producing for him.

In the 1960s, he worked for the television production company Robert Saudek Associates and worked as a writer and producer for CBS from 1962 to 1967. His 1964 documentary about cellist Pablo Casals, Casals at 88, won the Prix Italia. He was the second Dean of the New York University School of the Arts (NYU) from 1969 to 1991, which was transformed under his leadership from a collection of disparate arts programs into a major institution with courses offered in photography, cinema, musical theater, dramatic acting, and writing.

== Early years ==
Oppenheim was born in Detroit in 1922 to Louis Oppenheim and Julia Nurko Oppenheim. His father owned a department store. He had one sibling, a brother, Stanley. His family was Jewish. At the age of thirteen, upon the death of his father, he and his family relocated to New York City, where he spent most of his life. He began playing the clarinet after this move and by age 20 was considered to be an accomplished player. He attended Juilliard and graduated from the Eastman School of Music in 1943. During World War II he served as an anti-tank gunner.

== Career ==
David Diamond's Quintet for clarinet, 2 violas and 2 cellos (1950) was written for Oppenheim and was first performed in 1952. Throughout the 1950s, Oppenheim directed the Masterworks division of Columbia Records, a position he held until 1959. He recorded Leonard Bernstein's Clarinet Sonata, which was dedicated to him. Other recordings include the Brahms Clarinet Trio, Op. 114 with Casals and Eugene Istomin at the 1955 Prades Festival, and both the Brahms Clarinet Quintet, Op. 115, and the Mozart Clarinet Quintet, K. 581, with the Budapest String Quartet in 1959. Also in 1955, he worked with Stravinsky who conducted his "Story of a Soldier". The two became friends, and Oppenheim later produced several of his works and documentaries.

On January 11, 1955, David Oppenheim attended Canadian pianist Glenn Gould's New York debut. He was so impressed with the performance that he contacted his manager at Columbia Records, who then negotiated a contract with Gould.

In the 1960s, he worked for the television production company under Robert Saudek, and helped produce Leonard Bernstein and the New York Philharmonic. He produced the Omnibus TV series, and worked as a writer and producer for CBS from 1962 until 1967. In 1964, Oppenheim wrote, produced and directed Casals at 88, a documentary about the cellist, which garnered the Prix Italia.

Oppenheim became the second dean of the New York University Tisch School of the Arts, serving from February 1969 to 1991. Under his tenure, the school expanded from four departments to 16 and enrollment climbed from 600 to 3,000 students. In 1985 he obtained a $7.5 million grant from the Tisch brothers, Laurence and Preston, which helped centralize the school in one location, a 12-story building at 721 Broadway.

== Personal life ==
His first marriage was to actress Judy Holliday, from 1948 to 1957. Oppenheim struggled with his sexual orientation; Bernstein, a mutual friend, suggested that Oppenheim marry Holliday as a beard. (In 1943, Bernstein wrote in a letter to Oppenheim, then in the U.S. Army, that he had thought of marrying Holliday himself.) Oppenheim and Holliday had a son, Jonathan, who became a film editor whose work includes Paris Is Burning, Children Underground, and Arguing the World.

Oppenheim's second marriage (1957–76) was to Ellen Adler, daughter of Stella Adler. They had a daughter, Sara, and a son, Thomas, who became president and artistic director of Stella Adler Studio of Acting. He married Patricia Jaffe in 1987. Their grandson is musician Del Water Gap. The title to his second album, I Miss You Already + I Haven’t Left Yet, was inspired by Oppenheim's memento to Jaffe.

Oppenheim died in New York City in 2007.

== In popular culture ==
Oppenheim was portrayed as Bernstein's 1940s lover by Matt Bomer in Bradley Cooper's 2023 film Maestro.
