= Bells Are Ringing (musical) =

1956 American musical

- Original Cast Recording
- Music: Jule Styne
- Lyrics: Betty Comden; Adolph Green
- Book: Betty Comden; Adolph Green
- Productions: 1956 Broadway; 1957 West End; 1958 Australia; 2001 Broadway revival

Bells Are Ringing is a musical with a book and lyrics by Betty Comden and Adolph Green and music by Jule Styne. The story revolves around Ella, who works at an answering service, and the characters that she meets there. The main character was based on Mary Printz, who worked for Green's answering service. Three of the show's tunes, "Long Before I Knew You", "Just in Time", and "The Party's Over", became standards.

Judy Holliday reprised her Broadway starring role in the 1960 film of the same name, also starring Dean Martin.

== Productions ==
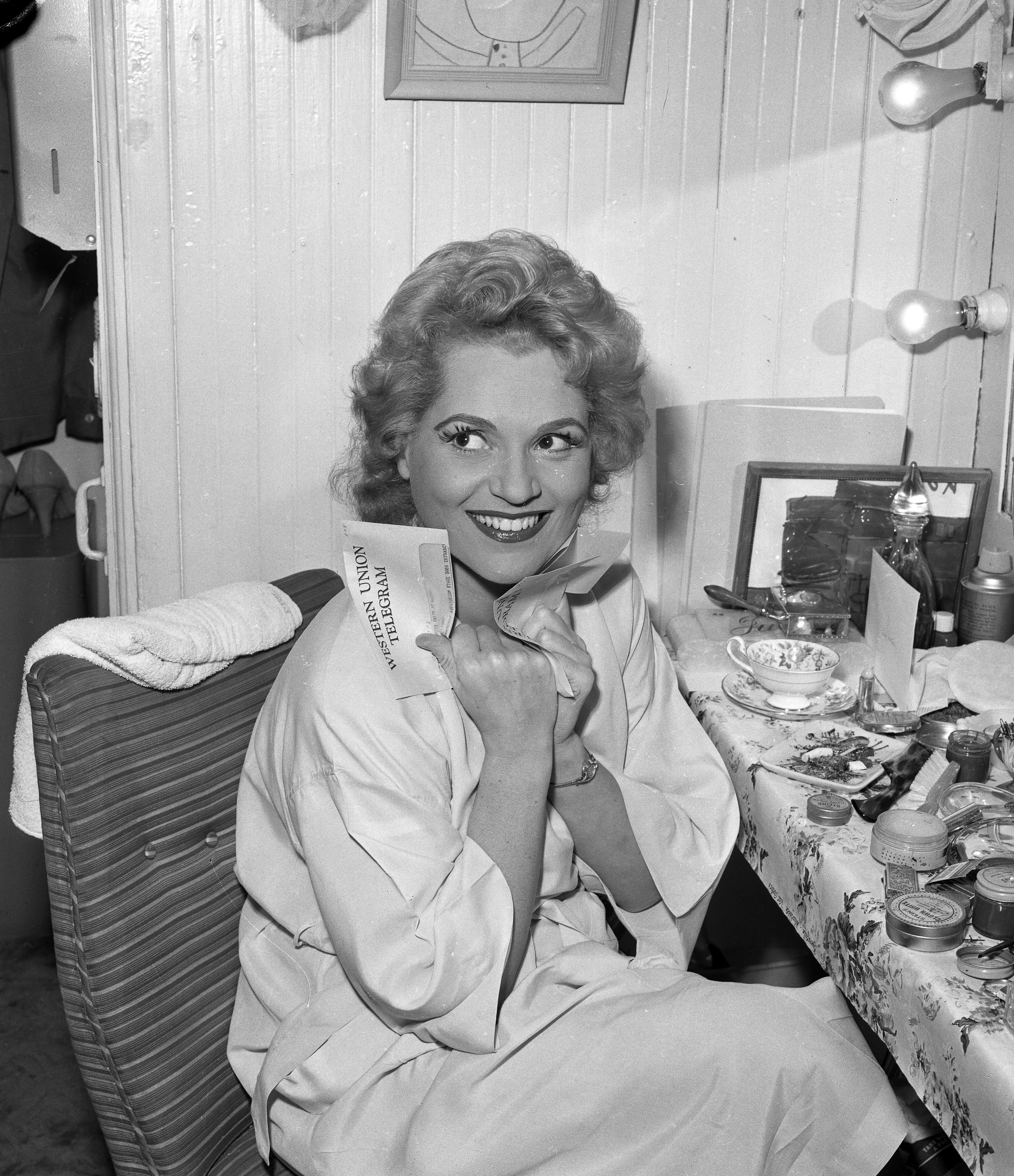
Judy Holliday in her dressing room before the Los Angeles premiere of Bells Are Ringing with the Los Angeles Civic Light Opera (1959)

The original Broadway production, directed by Jerome Robbins and choreographed by Robbins and Bob Fosse, opened on November 29, 1956, at the Shubert Theatre, where it ran for slightly more than two years before transferring to the Alvin Theatre, for a total run of 924 performances. It starred Judy Holliday as Ella and Sydney Chaplin as Jeff Moss. It also featured Jean Stapleton as Sue Summers, Eddie Lawrence as Sandor, George S. Irving, Jack Weston, Peter Gennaro, and Donna Sanders. Scenic and Costume design was by Raoul Pène Du Bois and the lighting design was by Peggy Clark. During her vacation, Holliday was replaced briefly by Betty Garrett. The original cast album was released by Columbia Records. In the Metro-Goldwyn-Mayer film adaptation of the same name, Holliday reprised her role as Ella with Dean Martin as Jeff.

The West End production opened on November 14, 1957, at the Coliseum, where it ran for 292 performances. The cast included Janet Blair as Ella Peterson, George Gaynes as Jeff Moss, Jean St. Clair as Sue Summers, Eddie Molloy as Sandor, and Allyn McLerie as Gwynne Smith.

The Australian production opened April 5, 1958, at the Princess Theatre, Melbourne. Produced by Garnet H. Carroll and starring Shani Wallis as Ella Peterson, Bruce Trent, Gábor Baraker, and Kay Eklund. The production was not a financial success as it did not tour.

A Mexican production opened in 1958 at the Teatro del Bosque in Mexico City. The cast included Silvia Pinal as Ella Peterson. It was the first musical comedy to open in Latin America.

The show was revised for a production at the Menzies Hotel in Sydney, Australia, opening March 19, 1968, and closing May 4, 1968. In order to cut the show down to 90 minutes, director Jon Ewing removed the song-writing dentist character, Dr Kitchell, and his song "The Midas Touch". Ewing wrote updated lyrics for "Drop That Name" and added "Better Than a Dream". The cast included Nancye Hayes as Ella Peterson, Doug Kingsman as Jeff Moss, Judith Roberts as Sue, Reg Gorman as Sandor, Rex McClenaghan as Francis, and Phil Jay as Inspector Barnes; with Peter Noble, Julie Haslehurst, and Brian Tucker.

A Broadway revival, directed by Tina Landau and choreographed by Jeff Calhoun, opened on April 12, 2001, at the Plymouth Theatre where, struggling to overcome mediocre reviews and ongoing hostility between the show's producers and its cast and crew, it finally closed after 68 performances and 36 previews. The cast included Faith Prince as Ella, Marc Kudisch as Jeff, David Garrison, and Beth Fowler.

The Union Theatre in London staged a revival of Bells Are Ringing in late 2010, with leading lady Anna-Jane Casey in the role of Ella Peterson. The production was well reviewed and sold out its brief run.

In November 2010, New York City Center's Encores! series produced a semi-staged concert of the show starring Kelli O'Hara, Will Chase, and Judy Kaye. Reviews for O'Hara were excellent, but critics felt the show itself was too dated for modern audiences. Ben Brantley in his New York Times review wrote: "Ms. O’Hara is the possessor of a liquid soprano that was made for the shimmering romantic confessions so essential to classic American musicals. Offering sincerity without saccharine, her voice seems to emerge almost involuntarily, as if she just couldn't help acting on an irresistible urge. Though obviously highly trained, that voice brims with a conversational ease that makes you forget that singing is not usually the form we choose for confiding in others, even in this age of 'Glee'... This 1956 musical...was revived on Broadway only nine years ago (with Faith Prince), and it seemed irretrievably dated then."

Porchlight Music Theatre presented Bells Are Ringing as a part of "Porchlight Revisits" in which they stage three forgotten musicals per year. It played in Chicago, Illinois, in October 2014, and was directed by Michael Weber and Dina DiCostanzo, with music directed by Linda Madonia.

The Hayes Theatre in Sydney, Australia presented Bells Are Ringing in 2022, as part of their Neglected Musicals series. The show was performed in full with scripts in hand, accompanied by a piano after only one day's rehearsal. Penny McNamee starred as Ella Peterson, with Direction by Luke Joslin.

== Plot ==
Setting: New York City, late 1950s

ACT ONE

Ella Peterson works for "Susanswerphone", a telephone answering service owned by a woman named Sue. She listens in on others' lives and adds some interest to her own humdrum existence by adopting different identities – and voices – for her clients. They include Blake Barton, an out-of-work Method actor, Dr. Kitchell, a dentist with musical yearnings but lacking talent, and playwright Jeff Moss, who is suffering from writer's block and with whom Ella has fallen in love, although she has never met him. Ella considers the relationships with these clients "perfect" because she can't see them and they can't see her ("It's a Perfect Relationship").

Jeff is writing a play called "The Midas Touch," the first play he's written since his writing partner left him ("Independent (On My Own)"). One day the producer of the play insists that he finish the play by the next morning and meet him at 9:00 am. While asking her to wake him up on time, he turns to Ella (who he only knows as the Susanswerphone lady) for help in writing the play. Meanwhile, Sandor, Sue's rich boyfriend, reveals plans to a group of gangsters to use Susanswerphone as a front for a gambling operation, by pretending to be a record seller and taking orders for "symphonies" as code. ("It's a Simple Little System").

Ella wants to visit Jeff's apartment to help him write the play, but she is intercepted by a policeman who is convinced that Susanswerphone is a front for an "escort service". Ella asks him "Is it a Crime?" to help someone in need? He agrees that it isn't, and lets her go. She arrives at Jeff's apartment and offers him help with his play, and a romance ensues ("I Met a Girl," "Long Before I Knew You").

ACT TWO

Ella is preparing to go to a party at Jeff's apartment, feeling nervous about meeting his friends. Carl, a friend of hers, helps her regain her confidence with a cha-cha dance ("Mu-Cha-Cha"). The guests at the party are all very pretentious and rich and snobby ("Drop That Name") and they make Ella feel very out of place. She leaves Jeff ("The Party's Over").

Carl, a music nerd, thwarts Sandor's operation when he receives an order for "Beethoven's 10th symphony," because he knows that Beethoven only wrote 9 symphonies. The policeman arrests Sandor. Meanwhile, Jeff comes to Susanswerphone to confess his love for Ella. She quits Susanswerphone in order to make a life with herself and Jeff ("I'm Going Back").

== Song list ==
Act I

- "Bells Are Ringing" – Telephone Girls
- "It's a Perfect Relationship" – Ella Peterson
- "Independent" (original title: "On My Own") – Jeff Moss and Ensembles
- "You've Got to Do It" – Jeff Moss
- "It's a Simple Little System" – Sandor and Ensemble
- "Is It a Crime?" – Ella Peterson
- "Better Than a Dream" – Ella Peterson and Jeff Moss (later addition to original production)
- "Hello, Hello There" – Ella Peterson, Jeff Moss and Ensemble
- "I Met a Girl" – Jeff Moss and Ensemble
- "Long Before I Knew You" – Jeff Moss and Ella Peterson

Act II

- "Mu-Cha-Cha" – Carl and Ella Peterson
- "Just in Time" – Jeff Moss, Ella Peterson and Ensemble
- "Drop That Name" – Ella Peterson and Ensemble
- "The Party's Over" – Ella Peterson
- "Salzburg" – Sue and Sandor
- "The Midas Touch" – Nightclub Singer and Ensemble
- "Long Before I Knew You" (Reprise) – Ella Peterson
- "I'm Going Back" – Ella

Note: "Better Than a Dream" was actually written during the Broadway run and later incorporated into the 1960 film.

== Casts (1950s-1970s) ==
Character	Original Broadway Production	Original West End Production	Original Australian Production	US National Tour	The Muny Production	Pittsburgh Civic Light Opera Production	Famous Artists County Playhouse Production	Film Version	Casa Mañana Production	Kenley Players Production	Kansas City Starlight Production	The Muny Production	Dallas Summer Musicals Production	Casa Mañana Production	The Muny Production
Character	1956-1959	1957-1958	1958	1959				1960		1966			1968	1974	1979
Ella Peterson	Judy Holliday	Janet Blair	Shani Wallis	Judy Holliday	Jacqueline James	Sara Dillon	Imogene Coca	Judy Holliday	Pamela Britton	Edie Adams	Betty White	Betty White	Patti Karr	Ruta Lee	Florence Henderson
Jeff Moss	Sydney Chaplin	George Gaynes	Bruce Trent	Hal Linden	Julius La Rosa	Vincent Beck	?	Dean Martin	Vincent Beck	Donald Bruce Stewart	Allen Ludden	Allen Ludden	Van Johnson	Scot Stewart	Dean Jones
Sue Summers	Jean Stapleton	Jean St Clair	Kay Eklund	Alice Pearce	Dorothy Greener	Gubi Mann	?	Jean Stapleton	Lucy Greeno	Louise Kirtland	Karen Knott	Dawna Shove	?	Lou Hancock	Lola Fisher
J. Sandor Prantz	Eddie Lawrence	Eddie Molloy	Gábor Baraker	Eddie Lawrence	Eddie Lawrence	Clarence Hoffman	?	Eddie Foy Jr. (as J. Otto Prantz)	Jack Harrold	Leonard Elliott	Zale Kessler	Zale Kessler	?	Haskell Gordon	Gino Conforti
Inspector Barnes	Dort Clark	Donald Stewart	?	Dort Clark	Peter Turgeon	Stanley Carlson	?	Dort Clark	David Combes	David Doyle	George Church	James Paul	?	Ralph M. Clift	John Brandon
Larry Hastings	George S. Irving	Robert Henderson	?	Paul Lipson	Edmund Lyndeck	Will Hussing	?	Fred Clark	John Smith	John Derrick	George Wasko	Brad Holiday	?	Marve Conn	Myron Natwick
Carl	Peter Gennaro	Harry Naughton	?	Frank Derbas	Frank Derbas	Frank Derbas	?	Doria Avila	Ray George	Hamp Dickens	Buck Heller	Michael Henry	?	Carl Tressler	Vincent Pirillo
Dr. Kitchell	Bernie West	Alexander Doré	?	Bernie West	Fred Harper	Lou Cutell	?	Bernie West	Fred Harper	John Bernabei	Bernie West	Matthew Tobin	?	Woody Romoff	Al Checco
Blake Barton	Frank Aletter	Franklin Fox	?	Frank Aletter	William Long	?	?	Frank Gorshin	Kevin Kelly	Dom Angelo	Tony Zito	James Bovaird	?	Michael Cook	Stephen G. Arlen
Paul Arnold	Steve Roland	Lewis Henry	?	Steve Roland	Richard Fredricks	?	?	—N/a	Paul Merrill	—N/a	—N/a	—N/a	?	Sam Scheffler	Bruce Tuthill
Francis	Jack Weston	C. Denier Warren	?	Ralph Roberts	Joseph Cusanelli	James DeBlasis	?	Ralph Roberts	Mark McCrary	Nate Barnett	D. L. Weaver	Duane Jones	?	Joey Evans	John Bernabei
Gwynne	Pat Wilkes	Allyn Ann McLerie	?	Sally Brown	Alice Nunn	Noel Riggs	?	Ruth Storey	Helen Guile	Del Green	Shirley Potter	Lois Carlson	?	Pat Gideon	Myrna White
Olga	Norma Doggett	Sheelagh Aldrich	?	Donna Sanders	Claire Alexander	?	?	Valerie Allen	Diane Barri	Jan Myers	Sherri Huff	Susan Fortney	?	Randalynn Schultz	Catherine Gaines
Ludwig Smiley	Frank Milton	Arthur Wilman	?	—N/a	—N/a	—N/a	—N/a	Oliver Blake	Bill Woodruff	Art Martinson	—N/a	—N/a	?	Zac Ward	—N/a

=== Notable Replacements ===
==== Original Broadway Production (1956–1959) ====
- Ella Peterson: Betty Garrett, Allyn Ann McLerie (s/b), Marge Redmond (u/s), Phyllis Newman (u/s)
- Jeff Moss: Larry Parks, Hal Linden, George Gaynes (s/b), Vincent Beck (u/s)
- Sue Summers: Alice Pearce
- J. Sandor Prantz: George S. Irving (u/s), Paul Lipson (u/s)
- Larry Hastings: Paul Lipson
- Francis: Heywood Hale Broun

==== Original West End Production (1957–1958) ====
- Ella Peterson: Julie Wilson

==== US National Tour (1959) ====
- Jeff Moss: Vincent Beck (u/s)
- J. Sandor Prantz: Paul Lipson (u/s)

== Casts (1980s-2020s) ==
Character	Equity Library Theatre Revival	Atlantic City Production	Greenwich Theatre Production	Goodspeed Musicals Production	Kennedy Center Concert Production	Musical Theatre Guild Concert Production	Reprise Theatre Company Production	Broadway Revival	Pittsburgh Civic Light Opera Production	West End Revival	Encores! Production	Berkshire Theatre Group Production
Character	1984	1985	1987	1990	1998	1999		2001		2010		2015
Ella Peterson	K. K. Preece	Susan Terry	Lesley Mackie	Lynne Wintersteller	Faith Prince	Tami Tappan Damiano	Carolee Carmello	Faith Prince	Victoria Clark	Anna-Jane Casey	Kelli O’Hara	Kate Baldwin
Jeff Moss	Mark Jacoby	Joe Namath	Ray Lonnen	Anthony Cummings	Alan Campbell	Michael G. Hawkins	Stephen Bogardus	Marc Kudisch	Robert Cuccioli	Gary Milner	Will Chase	Graham Rowat
Sue Summers	Lorna Erickson	Janie Kelly	Petra Siniawski	Liz Otto	Joyce Van Patten	Carol Kline	Brooks Almy	Beth Fowler	Karen Murphy	Corinna Powlesland	Judy Kaye	Sheryl Stern
J. Sandor Prantz	Lawrence Raiken	Paul Stolarsky	John Levitt	Ron Wisniski	Dick Latessa	James Gleason	Gary Beach	David Garrison	Ray DeMattis	Fenton Gray	David Pittu	Joseph Dellger
Inspector Barnes	Donald McGrath	?	Nick Kemp	Lew Resseguie	?	Chuck Bergman	Steve Vinovich	Robert Ari	Paul Palmer	Richard Grieve	Dylan Baker	Greg Roderick
Larry Hastings	George Emch	?	Gary Yershon	David Middleton	?	Richard Armbruster	Terry Rhoads	David Brummel	Rob Reed	Bob Harms	John C. Vennema	Walter Hudson
Carl	Kelly Woodruff	?	Hugh Craig	Kelly Patterson	Jim Molinaro	?	David Engel	Julio Agustin	Eric Sciotto	Carl Au	Jeffrey Schecter	Alex Puette
Dr. Kitchell	?	Larry Hansen	Gary Yershon	Gabor Morea	Jeff Blumenkrantz	Lenny Wolpe	Joe Joyce	Martin Moran	Jeffrey Howell	Adam Rhys-Charles	Brad Oscar	James Ludwig
Blake Barton	?	?	Michael Gyngell	Joe Joyce	Max Shippee	?	Troy Britton Johnson	Darren Ritchie	Daniel Krell	Tama Phethean	Bobby Cannavale	Alex Puette
Paul Arnold	David Jordan	?	Gerard Casey	Donald Ives	?	?	?	Lawrence Clayton	Zachary Halley	Marc Antolin	Michael Halling	James Ludwig
Francis	Herbert Mark Parker	?	Simon Coates	David Gurland	?	Phil Gold	Larry Raben	Jeffrey Bean	Mark Woodard	Michael Bryher	Danny Rutigliano	Andrew Cristi
Gwynne	Becky Garrett	?	Elena Ferrari	Celeste Simone	?	Mary Jo Mecca	Stephanie J. Block	Angela Robinson	Kathy Lash-Fuller	Aoife Nally	Leah Edwards	Sara Andreas
Olga	Valerie Lemon	?	Karen Pierce-Goulding	Malinda Shaffer	?	?	Lise Simms	Caitlin Carter	Sarrah Strimel	Victoria Hinde	Meggie Cansler	Kat Nejat
Ludwig Smiley	—N/a	?	Gerard Casey	Daniel Baum	—N/a	—N/a	—N/a	Lawrence Clayton	Kenneth McMullen	—N/a	William Ryall	—N/a

=== Notable Replacements ===
==== Broadway Revival (2001) ====
- Gwynne: Kelly Sullivan (u/s)
- Olga: Kelly Sullivan (u/s)

== Awards and nominations ==
=== Original Broadway production ===
Year	Award	Category	Nominee	Result
1957	Tony Award	Best Musical		Nominated
1957	Tony Award	Best Performance by a Leading Actress in a Musical	Judy Holliday	Won
1957	Tony Award	Best Performance by a Featured Actor in a Musical	Sydney Earle Chaplin	Won
1957	Tony Award	Best Choreography	Bob Fosse and Jerome Robbins	Nominated
1957	Theatre World Award		Sydney Chaplin	Won

=== 2001 Broadway revival ===
Year	Award	Category	Nominee	Result
2001	Tony Award	Best Revival of a Musical		Nominated
2001	Tony Award	Best Performance by a Leading Actress in a Musical	Faith Prince	Nominated
2001	Drama Desk Award	Outstanding Revival of a Musical		Nominated
2001	Drama Desk Award	Outstanding Actress in a Musical	Faith Prince	Nominated
