= Sonata for Clarinet and Piano (Bernstein) =

Clarinet Sonata
- by Leonard Bernstein
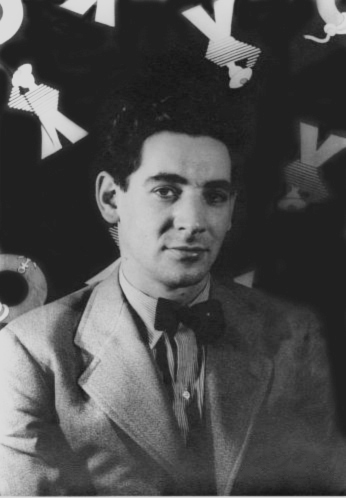
- The composer in 1944
- Composed: 1941–1942
- Dedication: David Oppenheim
- Published: 1942
- Movements: two

Leonard Bernstein's Sonata for Clarinet and Piano, written during 1941–42 and published in 1942, was Bernstein's first published piece. It is dedicated to clarinetist David Oppenheim, whom Bernstein met while studying conducting with Serge Koussevitzky at Tanglewood during the summers of 1940 and 1941.

== Form ==
The piece is about ten minutes in length and consists of two consecutive movements. The first movement is a lyrical grazioso, opening with a musical line reminiscent of Paul Hindemith, who was the composer-in-residence at Tanglewood in 1941, and hinting at the influence of Copland and the idyllic Tanglewood atmosphere.

The second movement begins andantino (time signature 3/8) and moves into a fast Vivace e leggiero after a tranquil opening. This movement is predominantly in 5/8 but also changes between 3/8, 4/8, and 7/8 throughout the piece and foreshadows Bernstein's work in West Side Story, with a walking bass line and syncopations. Later the more reflective mood of the first movement recurs, with a Latin-infused bridge passage that reflected the time Bernstein spent in Key West in the early compositional stages, before finishing in a flourish.

== Premiere ==
The premiere took place at the Institute of Modern Art in Boston, performed by David Glazer on clarinet and a then 23-year-old Leonard Bernstein on piano. The New York premiere took place a year later at the New York Public Library, with Bernstein again on piano and Oppenheim on clarinet. The two later released the first recording of the work, also in 1943.

== Reception ==
Now a popular piece in the clarinet repertoire, featured on the DipABRSM & AMEB examination syllabus, the Initial reviews were mixed. The Boston Globe and The Boston Herald reviewed the premiere. Though the former praised its jazz inflections, both felt the composing was stronger for the piano than for the clarinet. Many early reviews alluded to the influences of Hindemith and Copland and were very mixed. By the end of 1943, though, Bernstein had become a conducting star through his work with the New York Philharmonic and subsequent reviews were more positive and the jazz aspects were frequently referred to positively.

The sonata is now a part of the standard repertoire for clarinet and others outside of the clarinet world have embraced the piece. In 1994 it was orchestrated by Sid Ramin so that it can be played by a solo clarinet with orchestral accompaniment. Yo-Yo Ma has arranged this work for cello and piano. It has also been arranged for both violin and trombone.

Bernstein later returned to composing for the clarinet in 1949, when he composed Prelude, Fugue, and Riffs for Solo Clarinet and Jazz Ensemble, dedicated to Benny Goodman.
