= Phyllis Newman =

American actress and singer (1933–2019)

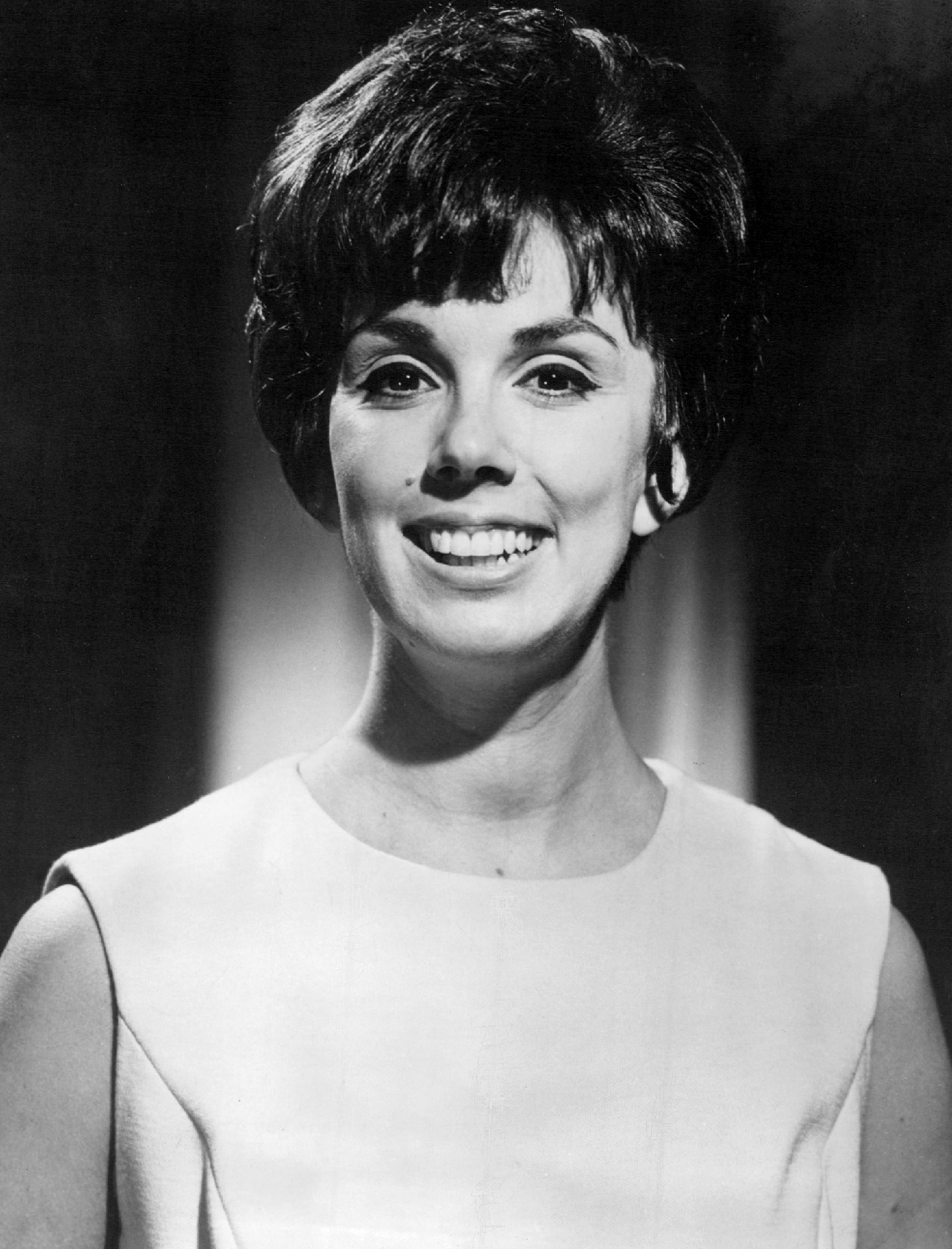
- Newman in 1966
- Born: March 19, 1933; Jersey City, New Jersey, U.S.
- Died: September 15, 2019 (aged 86); Manhattan, New York City, U.S.
- Occupations: Actress, singer
- Years active: 1952–2019
- Spouse: Adolph Green (m. 1960; died 2002)
- Children: Adam Green; Amanda Green

Phyllis Newman (March 19, 1933 – September 15, 2019) was an American actress and singer. She won the 1962 Tony Award for Best Featured Actress in a Musical for her role as Martha Vail in the musical Subways Are for Sleeping on Broadway, received the Isabelle Stevenson Award in 2009 and was nominated for another Tony for Broadway Bound (1987), as well as two nominations for Drama Desk Awards.

== Early life and education ==
Newman was born in Jersey City, New Jersey, one of three daughters of a Jewish immigrant couple. Her mother, Rachel Gottlieb, from Lithuania, was professionally known as Marvelle the Fortune Teller. Her father, Sigmund Newman, from Warsaw, billed himself as Gabel the Graphologist and hypnotist, working with his wife in Atlantic City boardwalk amusements. Newman performed on-stage as early as age four, impersonating Carmen Miranda, with encouragement from her father.

Newman had two sisters, Shirley (Mrs. Elliott) Porte, and Elaine (Mrs. Harry) Sandaufer. She attended Lincoln High School, where she was voted "Future Hollywood Star."

== Career ==
=== Broadway ===
Newman made her Broadway debut in Wish You Were Here in 1952. Additional theater credits include Bells Are Ringing, Pleasures and Palaces, The Apple Tree, On the Town, The Prisoner of Second Avenue, Awake and Sing!, Broadway Bound, and Subways Are for Sleeping, for which she won the Tony Award for Best Featured Actress in a Musical, beating out Barbra Streisand in I Can Get It for You Wholesale.

Newman played Stella Deems in the 1985 staged concert version of Follies at Avery Fisher Hall at Lincoln Center in New York. The concert produced both a cast recording as well as a filmed documentary, preserving her performance singing "Who's That Woman?". She recreated the role in the 1998 revival of Follies at the Paper Mill Playhouse in New Jersey.

In June 1979, Newman and Arthur Laurents collaborated on the one-woman show The Madwoman of Central Park West. Produced by Fritz Holt, it featured songs by Leonard Bernstein, Jerry Bock, John Kander, Martin Charnin, Betty Comden, Adolph Green, Edward Kleban, Fred Ebb, Sheldon Harnick, Peter Allen, Barry Manilow, Carole Bayer Sager, and Stephen Sondheim. The show ran for 86 performances at the 22 Steps Theatre in New York City.

=== Television ===
An early television role for Newman was in a 1957 episode of Beverly Garland's crime drama Decoy. In 1960, she was cast as Doris Hudson on the CBS summer replacement series Diagnosis: Unknown, with Patrick O'Neal as Dr. Daniel Coffee.

Newman became a major television celebrity of the 1960s and 1970s, a frequent panelist on the top-rated network game shows What's My Line?, To Tell the Truth and Match Game. Newman was a perennial guest performer with Johnny Carson on NBC's The Tonight Show, and was the first woman to guest host the show.

Newman played the ever-congenial Gwen Hunter on The Equalizer in the 1986 episode "Breakpoint," in which she decides to make the best of a deadly-serious hostage crisis created by the terrorist leader, played by Tony Shalhoub, and chat with her terrorist captor, portrayed by Ned Eisenberg. She also guest-starred as Elaine, the mother of Melissa (played by Melanie Mayron), on the 1980s television series Thirtysomething.

Newman created the role of former madame Renée Divine Buchanan on the ABC soap opera One Life to Live and was a regular on the primetime series 100 Centre Street and the satirical series That Was The Week That Was. Other television credits include The Man from U.N.C.L.E.; Burke's Law; ABC Stage 67; Murder, She Wrote; and The Wild Wild West. Newman departed the cast of One Life to Live to appear on Coming of Age, a short-lived comedy about a couple living in an Arizona retirement community, with veteran actors Paul Dooley, Glynis Johns and Alan Young.

In 2004, Newman played the meddlesome juror, Mrs. Sewruck, on Fox Television's series, The Jury in the episode, "Mail Order Mystery."

=== Film ===
Newman's feature film debut was an uncredited role as Juanita Badger in Picnic (1955). She also appeared, uncredited, in The Vagabond King (1956), which Paramount filmed first, but Picnic was released before The Vagabond King. Other film appearances include Let's Rock (1958), Bye Bye Braverman (1968), To Find a Man (1972), Mannequin (1987), Only You (1994), The Beautician and the Beast (1997), A Price Above Rubies (1998), A Fish in the Bathtub (1999), and The Human Stain (2003).

=== Music ===
In addition to her appearances on original cast recordings, Newman recorded Those Were the Days, an album of contemporary songs, for Sire Records in 1968. In England, the album was released as Phyllis Newman's World of Music on London Records.

=== The Phyllis Newman Women's Health Initiative ===
In 1995, Newman founded The Phyllis Newman Women's Health Initiative of the Actors Fund of America. Since then, she hosted the annual gala Nothing Like a Dame, which has raised more than US $3.5 million and served 2,500 women in the entertainment industry.

In 2009, Newman received the first Isabelle Stevenson Award, a special Tony Award, for her work with the Health Initiative. This award recognizes "an individual from the theatre community for [his or her] humanitarian work."

=== Memoir ===
Her memoir Just in Time — Notes from My Life relates her career; life with her husband, lyricist and playwright Adolph Green; and her experience with breast cancer.

== Personal life and death ==
Newman was married to lyricist and playwright Adolph Green from 1960 until his death in 2002. She was the mother of journalist Adam Green and singer-songwriter Amanda Green. Newman died on September 15, 2019, at the age of 86, from complications of a lung disorder.

== Filmography ==
=== Film ===
Phyllis Newman television credits
Year	Title	Role	Notes	Ref.
1955	Picnic	Juanita Badger - Cool Girl	Uncredited	
1956	The Vagabond King	Lulu	Uncredited	
1958	Let's Rock	Kathy Abbott		
1968	Bye Bye Braverman	Myra Mandelbaum		
1972	To Find a Man	Betty McCarthy		
1977	A Secret Space	Ann		
1987	Mannequin	Emmy's Mother		
1991	Saying Kaddish	Lynn		
1994	Only You	Faith's Mother		
1997	The Beautician and the Beast	Judy Miller		
1998	A Price Above Rubies	Mrs. Gelbart		
1998	A Fish in the Bathtub	Sylvia Rosen		
2000	Just for the Time Being	Maggie	AKA Unfaithful Love	
2000	It Had to Be You	Judith Penn		
2003	The Human Stain	Iris Silk		

=== Television ===
Phyllis Newman television credits
Year	Title	Role	Notes	Ref.
1957	Decoy	Joanne Kittredge	Episode: "Dream Fix" (S1.E5)	
1958	Decoy	Elsa Kramer	Episode: "The Lost Ones" (S1.E39)	
1960	Diagnosis: Unknown	Doris Hudson	9 episodes	
1965	The Man from U.N.C.L.E.	Sophie	1 episode	
1965	Burke's Law	Comrade Alexia Salov	1 episode	
1966	The Wild Wild West	Princess Wanakee	1 episode	
1966	ABC Stage 67	Mary Severance	Episode: "Olympus 7-0000" (S1.E5)	
1968	CBS Playhouse	Tina Hoffman	Episode: "The People Next Door" (S2.E1)	
1986	The Equalizer	Gwen Hunter	Episode: "Breakpoint" (S1.E19)	
1986	Great Performances	Stella Deems	Episode: "Follies in Concert" (S14.E10)	
1987–1988	One Life to Live	Renée Divine Buchanan	Regular cast	
1988–1989	Coming of Age	Ginny Hale	15 episodes	
1989–1990	Thirtysomething	Elaine Steadman	3 episodes	
1991	Murder, She Wrote	Edina Hayes	Episode: "The Taxman Cometh" (S7.E15)	
2001–2002	100 Centre Street	Sara Rifkind	15 episodes	
2004	The Jury	Mrs. Sewruck	Episode: "Mail Order Mystery"	

== See also ==
- List of American television actresses
- List of breast cancer patients by occupation
- List of people from Jersey City, New Jersey
- List of people from New York City
