= Only (film) =

2019 film

- Directed by: Takashi Doscher
- Produced by: Eyal Rimmon; Gabrielle Pickle
- Starring: Freida Pinto; Leslie Odom Jr.; Chandler Riggs; Jayson Warner Smith; Joshua Mikel; Tia Hendricks
- Release dates: April 27, 2019 (Tribeca Film Festival); March 6, 2020
- Running time: 98 minutes
- Country: United States
- Language: English

Only is a 2019 American post-apocalyptic romance film, directed by Takashi Doscher and starring Freida Pinto and Leslie Odom Jr.

== Plot ==
In the film, a couple, Will and Eva (played by Odom and Pinto), are forced to hide after ash from a comet containing a virus kills most of the women in the world. The film has a non-chronological structure, with scenes from earlier in the outbreak interspersed with the main storyline. The plot involves Will attempting to keep Eva safe from the government and bounty hunters, since women have become extremely valuable. It has been compared to the comic series Y: The Last Man.

== Cast ==
- Freida Pinto as Eva
- Leslie Odom Jr. as Will
- Chandler Riggs as Casey
- Jayson Warner Smith as Arthur

== Release ==
The film premiered at the 2019 Tribeca Film Festival, and was released in cinemas on 6 March 2020. It was subsequently released on Netflix US on July 5, 2020, quickly skyrocketing into the top ten most watched films on the platform.

Only was Doscher's second film, after Still, which he directed in 2018. Before narrative film, Doscher co-directed the ESPN documentary, A Fighting Chance, starring Kyle Maynard.

== Reception ==
The film received mixed reviews from critics, with a 40% score on the review aggregator Rotten Tomatoes (with 20 reviews in total). Critics have praised the film's "somber, reflective screenplay", and "warm, affectingly natural performances". However, a few others have also criticized the film for its non-linear structure and the portrayal of Will and Eva's relationship, which has been polarizing for some viewers. One critic has claimed the character of Will as misogynistic, while another praised the film for depicting "a love that is powerful and transcendent."
