= Out of the Shadow (2004 film) =

- Directed by: Susan Smiley
- Release date: 2004
- Running time: 67 minutes
- Country: United States

Out of the Shadow is a 2004 grassroots documentary film by Susan Smiley about her mother, Mildred Smiley, a middle-aged woman who has battled schizophrenia for over twenty years. The documentary chronicles her journey from psychiatric wards, nursing and group homes in Illinois, United States.

Out of the Shadow is composed of interview footage interspersed with home movies and photographs.

The film has been positively reviewed by mental health journals such as Clinical Psychiatry News and the Journal of Medical Humanities.
