= Simply Christmas =

Studio album by Leslie Odom Jr.
- Released: November 11, 2016
- Length: 31:19
- Label: S-Curve
- Producer: Steve Greenberg

Leslie Odom Jr. chronology
| Leslie Odom Jr. (2016) | Simply Christmas (2016) | Mr (2019) |

Simply Christmas is the second studio album by American entertainer Leslie Odom Jr.. It was released by S-Curve Records on November 11, 2016 in the United States. His first Christmas album, it features jazz interpretations of Christmas standards that were produced by Steve Greenberg. It became Odom's second consecutive album to reach the top spot on Billboard's US Top Jazz Albums. A year later, in October 2017, a deluxe edition of Simply Christmas was released with four additional songs.

== Background ==
In 2016, Odom was signed to a four-album deal with S-Curve Records. His first album, an updated and improved re-release of Leslie Odom Jr., was released in June 2016, before Odom left the Broadway cast of Hamilton, and charted at number one on Billboard's US Top Jazz Albums and number 147 on the US Billboard 200.

== Production ==
Odom had frequently been asked by fans to make a Christmas album, leading to the creation of Simply Christmas. Odom strove for a more unique sound: "I didn't want it to be sad. I didn't want it to be sullen. But I don't think the album was really ever cheerful," he said in an interview.

Before recording, Odom and producer Steve Greenberg developed a list of 75–100 Christmas songs to choose from. Odom referred to the Carpenters' song "Merry Christmas Darling" as a "surprise" addition from Greenberg that Odom didn't expect to work, "but it ended up working."

After recording Simply Christmas, Odom was dissatisfied with the initial result. He told The Wall Street Journal:

When we got the masters back in September, I hated them. It was so bad. I was already hard on myself in the vocal booth – whenever you're setting out to record something like "The Christmas Song," it's a lot different than singing at a Christmas party. You want to make sure that it sounds sincere and honest. When I was listening to it I hated it so much. We begged for a little bit more time from the record company... We took the thing apart.

On November 11, 2016, after Odom rerecorded a number of tracks, S-Curve released Simply Christmas as Odom's second album.

In an interview with the New York Observer, Odom added that he wanted to create an album that didn't feel disconnected from the political climate, an album with a "finger on the pulse of the time we're living in." He also noted, "We give ourselves permission to abandon ship if a project isn't working out. We'd rather walk out then put something out that's subpar. We didn't know if the Christmas album would be something we're proud of, but it is."

== Promotion ==
Odom toured in 2016 and 2017 to promote the album, performing concerts backed by a jazz quintet that included a drummer, percussionist, bassist, guitarist, and a pianist who is also Odom's musical director, a deluxe edition of the album was released in October 2017 with four additional songs: "The Christmas Waltz", "Christmas", "Edelweiss", and "Please Come Home for Christmas".

== Critical reception ==
Professional ratings
Review scores
| Source | Rating |
|---|---|
| AllMusic | 3/5 stars |
| Entertainment Weekly | B− |

AllMusic editor Marcy Donelson called the album an "exquisite set" and found that Simply Christmas "should especially please admirers of [Odom's] jazz-styled eponymous album, as he presents similarly elegant versions of seasonal favorites ranging from Schubert's "Ave Maria" to 2008's "Winter Song" by Sara Bareilles and Ingrid Michaelson. Arranged mainly for piano throughout, with bass, drums, acoustic guitar, and rare keyboards and trombone, it's got small dinner parties and nostalgic winter evenings in front of the fireplace in mind." Entertainment Weekly's Eric Renner Brown gave the albuma a B− rating. He felt that Odom "strikes a different tone on this elegant but subdued album" and recommened playing "this during dessert and coffee." Clint Rhodes, writing for The Herald-Standard, described Simply Christmas as "warm and reflective." He felt that Odom "delivers a pristine performance with a voice that is silky smooth and comforting" and concluded: "It is charming. It is nostalgic. It is simply wonderful."

== Commercial performance ==
Simply Christmas marked Odom's second charting album in five months. It opened at 31 on the US Billboard 200, selling 15,000 album-equivalent units, 14,000 of which were from traditional album sales. The set also arrived at number one on Billboard's US Top Jazz Albums chart, becoming his second consecutive album to reach the top spot, as well as at number four on the US Top Holiday Albums.

== Track listing ==
Simply Christmas track listing
| No. | Title | Writer(s) | Length |
|---|---|---|---|
| 1. | "Have Yourself a Merry Little Christmas" | Hugh Martin; Ralph Blane | 4:24 |
| 2. | "First Noel" | Traditional | 3:08 |
| 3. | "My Favorite Things" | Oscar Hammerstein II; Richard Rodgers | 5:51 |
| 4. | "I'll Be Home for Christmas" | Walter Kent; Buck Ram; Kim Gannon | 3:43 |
| 5. | "The Christmas Song" | Robert Wells; Mel Tormé | 4:06 |
| 6. | "Merry Christmas Darling" | Frank Pooler; Richard Carpenter | 2:50 |
| 7. | "Winter Song" | Sara Bareilles; Ingrid Michaelson | 4:03 |
| 8. | "Ave Maria" | Franz Schubert; Walter Scott | 3:15 |
| Total length: | | | 31:19 |

2017 deluxe edition track listing
| No. | Title | Writer(s) | Length |
|---|---|---|---|
| 1. | "Have Yourself a Merry Little Christmas" | Martin; Blane | 4:24 |
| 2. | "My Favorite Things" | Hammerstein; Rodgers | 5:51 |
| 3. | "The Christmas Waltz" | Jule Styne; Sammy Cahn | 3:03 |
| 4. | "First Noel" | Traditional | 3:08 |
| 5. | "Christmas" | Pete Townshend | 2:48 |
| 6. | "I'll Be Home for Christmas" | Kent; Ram; Gannon | 4:06 |
| 7. | "Edelweiss" (featuring Nicolette Robinson) | Hammerstein; Rodgers | 2:27 |
| 8. | "The Christmas Song" | Wells; Tormé | 4:06 |
| 9. | "Please Come Home for Christmas" | Charles Brown; Gene Redd | 4:34 |
| 10. | "Merry Christmas Darling" | Pooler; Carpenter | 2:50 |
| 11. | "Winter Song" | Bareilles; Michaelson | 4:03 |
| 12. | "Ave Maria" | Schubert; Scott | 3:15 |
| Total length: | | | 44:12 |

== Personnel ==
- Leslie Odom, Jr. — Vocal
- Matthew Bumgardner — Trombone
- John Davis — Drums
- Dezron Douglas — Upright Bass
- Roy Dunlap — Keyboards
- Orlando le Fleming — Bass, Upright Bass
- Tommy King — Piano
- Mark McLean — Drums
- Senfaub Stoney — Percussion
- Annastasia Victory — Piano
- Steven Walker — Acoustic Guitar

== Charts ==
Weekly chart performance for Simply Christmas
| Chart (2016) | Peak position |
|---|---|
| US Billboard 200 | 31 |
| US Top Jazz Albums (Billboard) | 1 |
| US Top Holiday Albums (Billboard) | 4 |

== Release history ==
Simply Christmas release history
| Region | Date | Edition(s) | Format(s) | Label(s) | Ref. |
|---|---|---|---|---|---|
| Various | November 11, 2016 | Standard | CD; digital download; streaming | S-Curve Records | |
| Various | October 27, 2017 | Deluxe | CD; digital download; streaming | S-Curve Records | |
