= You're the Reason I'm Living =

You're the Reason I'm Living may refer to:

- "You're the Reason I'm Living" (song), a 1963 single by Bobby Darin
- You're the Reason I'm Living (album), a 1963 album by Bobby Darin
