= Leslie Odom Jr. =

American actor, singer and songwriter (born 1981)

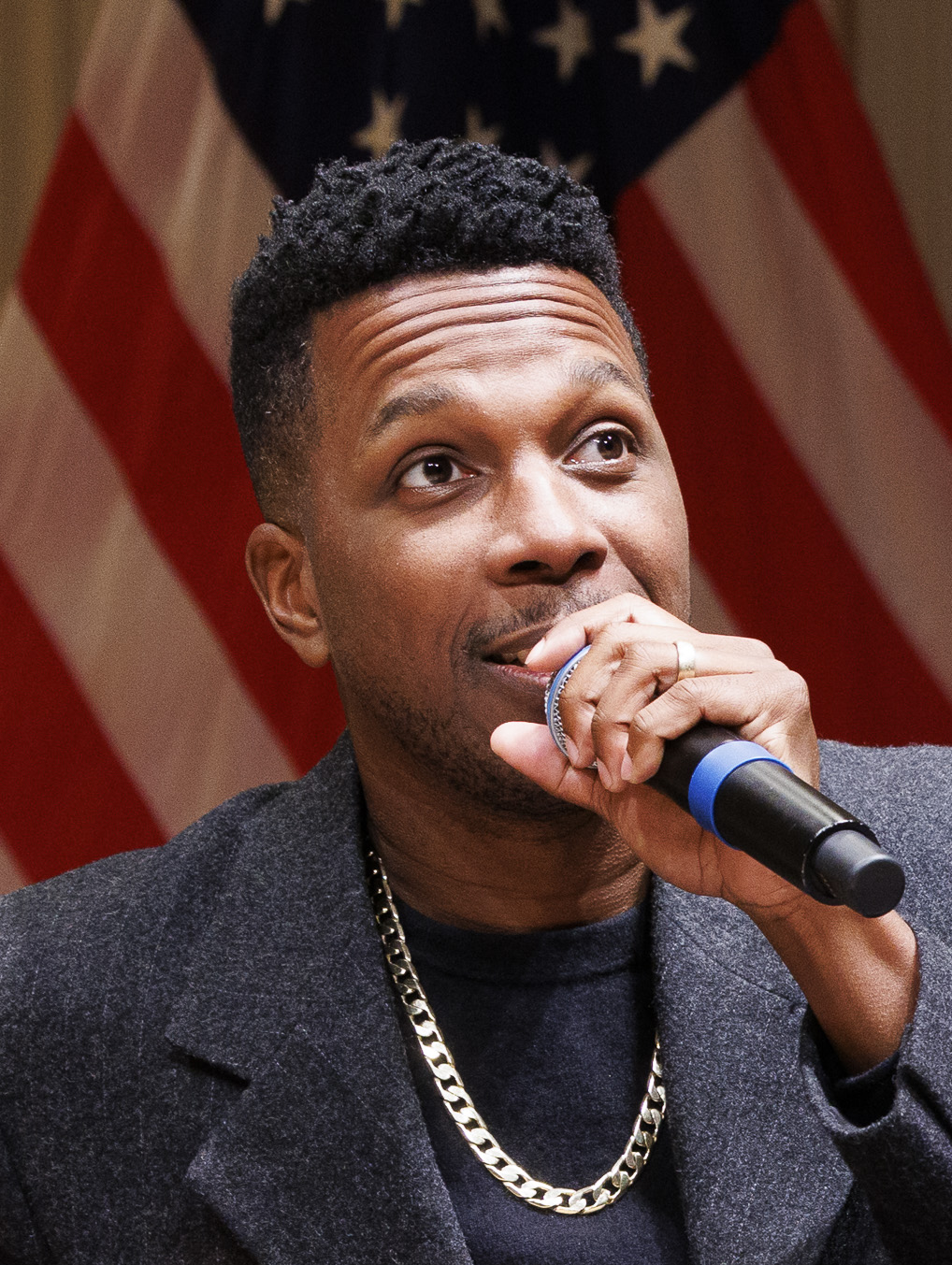
- Odom in 2024
- Born: Leslie Lloyd Odom Jr. August 6, 1981 (age 45); Queens, New York City, U.S.
- Education: Carnegie Mellon University (BFA)
- Occupations: Actor; singer; songwriter
- Years active: 1998–present
- Spouse: Nicolette Robinson (m. 2012)
- Children: 2
- Website: leslieodomjr.com

Leslie Lloyd Odom Jr. (/ˈoʊdəm/; born August 6, 1981) is an American actor, singer and songwriter. He made his acting debut on Broadway in 1998 and first gained recognition for his portrayal of Aaron Burr in the musical Hamilton, which earned him a Tony Award for Best Actor in a Musical and a Grammy Award for Best Musical Theater Album in the same year. His performance was captured in the Disney+ live stage recording of Hamilton which earned him a Primetime Emmy Award for Outstanding Actor in a Leading Role in a Limited Series or Movie nomination.

Odom is also known for his roles in the television series Smash (2012–2013) and Person of Interest (2013–2014) as well as the films Red Tails (2012), Murder on the Orient Express (2017), Harriet (2019), The Many Saints of Newark (2021), Glass Onion: A Knives Out Mystery (2022), and The Exorcist: Believer (2023). For his portrayal of singer Sam Cooke in the semi-historical drama One Night in Miami... (2020) he earned nominations for the Academy Award, Actor Award, BAFTA Award, Critics' Choice Movie Award, and Golden Globe Award for Best Supporting Actor. He was also nominated for the Academy Award and Golden Globe for Best Original Song for writing the film's song "Speak Now".

Odom voiced the character of Owen Tillerman in the Apple TV+ animated musical-comedy series Central Park, for which he was nominated for an Primetime Emmy Award in 2020. Odom has released five albums: Leslie Odom Jr. (2014), Simply Christmas (2016), Mr. (2019), The Christmas Album (2020), and When a Crooner Dies (2023). He released his autobiography, Failing Up, in 2018. Odom returned to Broadway in 2023, playing the title role in Purlie Victorious for which he earned a Tony Award for Best Actor in a Play nomination.

== Early life and education ==
Odom was born in Queens, New York City. His father, Leslie Lloyd Odom, worked in sales. One of his maternal great-grandfathers was from South Africa, and a maternal great-great-grandfather was from Bridgetown, Barbados. Odom's family moved to the East Oak Lane section of Philadelphia, where he grew up. He attended Julia R. Masterman School for middle school and Philadelphia High School for Creative and Performing Arts for high school. Odom and his family attended Canaan Baptist Church in the Germantown section of Philadelphia, where he sang solos in the church choir.

He earned a degree with honors at Carnegie Mellon University in Pittsburgh, Pennsylvania, and then moved to Los Angeles in the summer of 2003.

== Career ==
=== 1998–2013: Broadway debut and early roles ===
Odom attended the New Freedom Theatre in Philadelphia, where he studied theater and performed in musicals. He then went on to study musical theater in college. At the age of 17, he made his Broadway debut as Paul in the 1998 musical Rent. In 2001, he appeared in the ensemble of the one-night Broadway concert version of Dreamgirls. He has made guest appearances on several shows, including Gilmore Girls, Grey's Anatomy, Supernatural, and The Good Wife. Odom had a recurring role on CSI: Miami, appearing as Joseph Kayle in nine episodes between 2003 and 2006. He followed with a recurring role on Vanished, appearing in 10 episodes as Maliko Christo. From November 2006 to January 2007, he held a recurring role as Freddy on Big Day, appearing on nine episodes prior to its cancellation. He also had a supporting role in the television film Poe in May 2011. In the musical television series Smash, Odom had a recurring role as Sam Strickland in 2012 and was promoted to a starring role for the show's final season in 2013.

He spent much of his time doing theater in Los Angeles, including in 2010 with Leap of Faith, which moved to Broadway in 2012, with him starring as Isaiah Sturdevant. When the show closed shortly afterward, he relocated to New York City, where he appeared in short films and had a supporting role as Walter Hall in the 2012 war film Red Tails. After starring Off-Broadway in Venice and in Witness Uganda (later retitled Invisible Thread) at A.R.T. and in workshops, Odom worked with Lin-Manuel Miranda in the Encores! Off-Center production of Tick, Tick... Boom!, playing Michael. Odom also played Nat King Cole in the 2015 one-night Actors Fund of America benefit concert of Bombshell. In late 2013, Odom was offered the leading role of Lucas Newsome on State of Affairs, which he accepted but ended up backing out to take the part of Aaron Burr in the workshops of the musical Hamilton. In 2013 and 2014, he had a recurring role on Person of Interest as Peter Collier, appearing in eight episodes. He also played Reverend Curtis Scott in seven episodes of Law & Order: Special Victims Unit between 2013 and 2015.

=== 2014–2019: Stardom with Hamilton ===
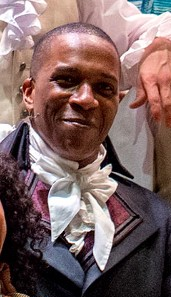
Odom in Hamilton in 2015

Odom reunited with Lin-Manuel Miranda portraying Aaron Burr in the workshop production of Hamilton at the 52nd Street Project in 2014. Odom returned to the role in the off-Broadway production at The Public Theater in 2015 and the Broadway production at the Richard Rodgers Theatre from 2015 to 2016. Odom Jr. acted alongside Miranda, Phillipa Soo, Renée Elise Goldsberry, Daveed Diggs, Christopher Jackson, Jasmine Cephas Jones, Anthony Ramos, Ariana DeBose and Jonathan Groff. Ben Brantley of The New York Times labeled the play a "Critic's Pick", describing Odom Jr. as "suavely brooding" citing his performance of "The Room Where It Happens" as being a "full-fledged showstopper". Marilyn Stasio of Variety wrote that he is an "irresistibly charming villain" citing Odom as being "charismatic perfection". For his performance he was nominated for a 2015 Drama Desk Award for Outstanding Featured Actor in a Musical and won the 2016 Tony Award for Best Actor in a Musical and the Grammy Award for Best Musical Theater Album. Odom's final appearance in the role of Aaron Burr in Hamilton occurred on July 9, 2016, being replaced by Brandon Victor Dixon.

Beginning on May 19, 2016, Odom hosted the Broadway.com web series Aaron Burr, Sir: Backstage at Hamilton with Leslie Odom Jr., with a new episode being uploaded every Thursday for eight weeks. He played Dr. Arbuthnot in Kenneth Branagh's 2017 adaptation of Murder on the Orient Express (2017). He also starred as abolitionist William Still in the historical drama film Harriet (2019), about abolitionist Harriet Tubman portrayed by Cynthia Erivo. The film received respectable reviews with critics praising Erivo's lead performance. Odom Jr. was nominated for the NAACP Image Award for Outstanding Supporting Actor in a Motion Picture at the 51st NAACP Image Awards. In 2019, Odom starred in Only, a post-apocalyptic romance alongside Freida Pinto. The film received negative reviews with critics citing its poor direction and writing while also praising the chemistry between the two leads. Frank Scheck of The Hollywood Reporter wrote, "It's not the fault of Odom and Pinto, who essentially carry the film with their intense performances".

=== 2020–present: Career expansion ===
In 2020, Odom starred and executive produced the four-part television miniseries Love in the Time of Corona opposite his wife Nicolette Robinson. Love in the Time of Corona follows four interwoven stories about the hopeful search for love and connection during the quarantine as a result of the COVID-19 pandemic. Production began virtually on June 29, 2020, in Los Angeles using remote technologies. The limited series premiered on Freeform on August 22, 2020. Odom voiced the character of Owen Tillerman in the Apple TV+ animated musical-comedy series Central Park, for which he was nominated for Outstanding Character Voice-Over Performance at the 2020 Primetime Emmy Awards. He also guest starred on the Disney+ The Proud Family continuation The Proud Family: Louder and Prouder in its second season as Kwame.

In 2020, Odom was cast as soul singer Sam Cooke in the Regina King–directed film adaptation of One Night in Miami, which was released in theaters and Amazon Prime on January 15, 2021. Odom received rave reviews from critics for his portrayal of Cooke and has since earned Academy Award, Golden Globe, and SAG Award nominations including for the Best Supporting Actor and an additional nomination for Outstanding Performance by a Cast in a Motion Picture. With Sam Ashworth as co-writer, Odom co-wrote and performed "Speak Now", which also received a nominations the Academy Award and Golden Globe Award for Best Song. "Speak Now" is played during the end credits of One Night in Miami. In May 2021, Odom was cast in the Glass Onion: A Knives Out Mystery, the sequel to Rian Johnson's Knives Out starring Daniel Craig as Benoit Blanc. In July 2021, Odom was cast in the supernatural horror film The Exorcist: Believer, a sequel to William Friedkin's The Exorcist, with Ellen Burstyn reprising her role as Chris MacNeil. In 2021, Odom starred as Ebo in the musical film Music, which was co-written and directed by Australian singer-songwriter Sia. It was released in February 2021. That same year he acted in the crime drama The Many Saints of Newark (2021), a prequel to the HBO drama series The Sopranos created by David Chase. He also reunited with his former co-stars Cynthia Erivo and Freida Pinto in the sci-fi romance Needle in a Timestack (2021).

From 2022 to 2023, he took a recurring guest spot as Draemond Winding, a chief executive of a Charter School in the ABC sitcom Abbott Elementary. In September 2023, Odom returned to Broadway starring in a revival of the Ossie Davis satirical farce Purlie Victorious opposite Kara Young and Jay O. Sanders. Jesse Green of The New York Times praised the production and Odom Jr.'s lead performance writing, "It's Odom who carries the play's weight as it shifts from genre to genre and reveals further layers of character...Odom, with the angry intensity of his Burr from “Hamilton,” does not shy from Purlie's scoundrelly side, his willingness to lie, even to loved ones, as a means of putting down a marker on eventual truth. And yet when it comes time to preach, watch out. The way he winds speeches into sermons and sermons nearly into songs makes it seem natural." It closed in February 2024 with Odom earning Tony Award nominations for his performance for Best Actor in a Play and as a producer for Best Revival of a Play. In May 2024, a recording of the show was broadcast on PBS.

In April 2025, it was announced that Odom would be reprising the role of Aaron Burr in the Broadway production of Hamilton from September 9, 2025 until November 26, 2025. He reunited with the original Broadway cast of Hamilton at the 78th Tony Awards where they performed for their 10 year anniversary.. In March 2026, it was announced that he will make his West End debut by reprising the role of Aaron Burr in the London production of Hamilton from July 3, 2026 until September 5, 2026.

== Other ventures ==
=== Recording career ===
In 2014, Odom self-released his debut album as a jazz singer, Leslie Odom Jr. on CD and SoundCloud, and promoted the album with several concerts at The Public Theater. In February 2016, he released a version of Selena Gomez's "Good For You" featuring his Hamilton castmate Daveed Diggs. Odom was signed to a four-album deal with S-Curve Records in 2016. He and producer Steve Greenberg narrowed down 200 potential tunes to ten tracks, and Odom recorded an updated and improved version of Leslie Odom Jr. during days off and afternoons before Broadway performances, in order to release the album before Odom left Hamilton. Released in June 2016, the album charted at No. 1 on Billboard Jazz and No. 147 on Billboard 200.

On November 11, 2016, Odom released his second album, Simply Christmas, which featured jazz interpretations of Christmas standards. A deluxe edition of the album was released in October 2017, with four additional songs. Simply Christmas hit #1 on iTunes and the Billboard Jazz charts, reaching No. 4 on the Billboard Holiday chart and No. 31 on the Billboard Top 200 chart. Odom released his third album and first of original material, Mr, in November 2019, and in October 2020, he debuted a new version of the album's standout song "Cold", featuring Sia. His critically acclaimed second holiday album, The Christmas Album, was released in November 2020. The Christmas Album is Odom's fourth studio album. Odom tours to promote his albums, performing concerts backed by a jazz quintet that includes a drummer, percussionist, bassist, guitarist, and pianist who is also Odom's musical director.

In December 2017, Odom returned to the New York City stage in a solo concert at Jazz at Lincoln Center. The cabaret-style performance was crafted around signature songs and music that shaped this artist's journey, all performed with a world-class band in front of a live audience. The show was filmed for broadcast as an hour-long PBS special as part of the 17-time Emmy Award-winning series, Live from Lincoln Center, and premiered in April 2018. In November 2023, Odom released his fifth studio album, When a Crooner Dies, featuring original music, published under BMG Rights Management.

=== Writing ===
In June 2017, it was announced that Odom had a book deal for Failing Up: How to Take Risks, Aim Higher, and Never Stop Learning, which he was writing with the intention to inspire younger readers. The book, which was published by an imprint of Macmillan in March 2018, "outlines the setbacks and rejections that preceded his success." Odom modeled his writing on the style of a commencement speech, exploring what he had learned throughout his life and the importance of pursuing passions.

== Personal life ==
Odom has been married to actress Nicolette Kloe Robinson since December 1, 2012. They have a daughter, born in April 2017, and a son, born in March 2021. The couple met in 2008 while Robinson was a student at UCLA and auditioned for Once on This Island in Los Angeles. When she replaced a cast member who left unexpectedly, assistant director Odom became responsible for quickly bringing her up to speed, and a romantic relationship ensued.

== Acting credits ==
=== Film ===
Year	Title	Role	Notes
2007	Scarecrow Joe	Joe	Short
2012	Red Tails	Declan 'Winky' Hall	
2015	Luna Goes Cruising	Oscar	Short
2017	Murder on the Orient Express	Dr. John Arbuthnot	
2019	Only	Will	
2019	Harriet	William Still	
2020	Hamilton	Aaron Burr	
2020	One Night in Miami...	Sam Cooke	
2021	Music	Ebo Odom	
2021	The Many Saints of Newark	Harold McBrayer	
2021	Needle in a Timestack	Nick Mikkelsen	
2022	Glass Onion: A Knives Out Mystery	Lionel Toussaint	
2023	The Exorcist: Believer	Victor Fielding	
2027	Get Lite	TBA	Filming

=== Television ===
Year	Title	Role	Notes
2003–2006	CSI: Miami	Joseph Kayle	Recurring role; 9 episodes
2004	The Big House	Lamont	2 episodes
2006	Threshold	Sergeant Adams	Episode: "The Crossing"
2006	Gilmore Girls	Quentin Walsh	Episode: "Bridesmaids Revisited"
2006	Vanished	Agent Malik Christo	Recurring role; 10 episodes
2006	Close to Home	Jordan Carter	Episode: "Prodigal Son"
2006–2007	Big Day	Freddy	Recurring role; 9 episodes
2007	The Bill Engvall Show	Mr. Pratt	2 episodes
2007	Supreme Courtships	Marcus	Television film
2008	Grey's Anatomy	P.J. Walling	Episode: "There's No "I" in Team"
2011	NCIS: Los Angeles	FBI Agent Duane Lausten	Episode: "Archangel"
2011	Zeke and Luther	Mr. Arliss Bunnyson	Episode: "Zeke, Luther, and Kojo Strike Gold"
2011	Bandwagon	Urban Glee performer	Episode: "You Can Do Anything"
2011	Supernatural	Guy	Episode: "Season Seven, Time for a Wedding"
2011	Poe	Julian 'Jupiter' Noble	Television film
2012	House of Lies	James	2 episodes
2012–2013	Smash	Sam Strickland	Lead role; 23 episodes
2013	Person of Interest	Peter Collier	Recurring role; 8 episodes
2013–2015	Law & Order: Special Victims Unit	Reverend Curtis Scott	Recurring role; 7 episodes
2014	Gotham	Ian Hargrove	Episode: "Harvey Dent"
2016	The Good Wife	Barry Pert	Episode: "Unmanned"
2016	Aaron Burr, Sir: Backstage at Hamilton with Leslie Odom Jr.	Host	Web series; 8 episodes
2018	We Bare Bears	Dr. Leslie	Voice, episode: "More Everyone's Tube"
2018	One Dollar	Randall Abatsy	4 episodes
2020–2022	Central Park	Owen Tillerman	Voice, main role
2020	Love in the Time of Corona	James	Main role
2020	Martha Knows Best	Himself	Episode: "Winter Is Coming"
2021	The Tony Awards Present: Broadway's Back!	Himself (host)	TV special
2021	Blue's Clues & You!	Mo Snow	Voice, episode: "Blue's Snowy Day Surprise"
2022–2023	Abbott Elementary	Draemond Winding	2 episodes
2023	The Proud Family: Louder and Prouder	Kwame	Voice, 3 episodes
2024	Great Performances	Purlie Victorious Judson	Episode: "Purlie Victorious"
2026	Imperfect Women	Donovon	Recurring role

=== Theatre ===
Year	Title	Role	Dates	Venue	Notes
1998	Rent	Paul / Cop / others	1998	Nederlander Theatre	Broadway
2001	Dreamgirls	Performer	September 24, 2001	Ford Center for the Performing Arts	Benefit Concert (Note: Actors Fund)
2004	Jersey Boys	Ensemble	October 5, 2004 – January 16, 2005	La Jolla Playhouse	Tryout
2007	Being Alive	Performer	August 25 – September 9, 2007	Westport Country Playhouse	Regional
2007	Being Alive	Performer	October 25 – December 2, 2007	Philadelphia Theatre Company	Regional
2008	Once on This Island	Agwe, God of Water	September 12–14, 2008	Freud Playhouse	Regional (Note: also assistant director)
2009	Soul of Rodgers	Performer	October 2–3, 2009	Reprise Theatre Company	Revue
2010	Leap of Faith	Isaiah Sturdevant	October 3–24, 2010	Ahmanson Theatre	Tryout
2012	Leap of Faith	Isaiah Sturdevant	April 26 – May 13, 2012	St. James Theatre	Broadway
2013	Venice	Markos Monroe	May 28 – June 30, 2013	The Public Theater	Off-Broadway
2014	Hamilton	Aaron Burr	May 2014	The 52nd Street Project	Workshop
2014	Tick, Tick... Boom!	Michael	June 24–28, 2014	New York City Center	Encores!
2015–2016	Hamilton	Aaron Burr	January 20 – May 3, 2015	The Public Theater	Off-Broadway
2015–2016	Hamilton	Aaron Burr	August 6, 2015 – July 9, 2016	Richard Rodgers Theatre	Broadway
2023–2024	Purlie Victorious	Purlie Victorious Judson	September 7, 2023 – February 4, 2024	Music Box Theatre	Broadway
2023	Gutenberg! The Musical!	Guest Producer (one night cameo)	October 10, 2023	James Earl Jones Theatre	Broadway
2025	Hamilton	Aaron Burr	September 9 – November 26, 2025	Richard Rodgers Theatre	Broadway
2026	Hamilton	Aaron Burr	July 3 – September 5, 2026	Victoria Palace Theatre	West End

Workshops

- Witness Uganda (later retitled Invisible Thread), 2010

== Discography ==
=== Studio albums ===
List of albums, with selected chart positions, sales, and certifications
Title	Album details	Peak chart positions			
Title	Album details	US	US Sales	US Jazz	US Holiday
Leslie Odom Jr.	Released: August 12, 2014; Label: Self-released; Formats: CD, digital download	147	59	1	—
Simply Christmas	Released: November 11, 2016; Label: S-Curve Records; Formats: CD, digital download, LP	31	12	1	4
Mr	Released: November 8, 2019; Label: S-Curve Records; Formats: CD, digital download	—	54	—	—
The Christmas Album	Released: November 6, 2020; Label: S-Curve Records; Formats: CD, digital download	—	—	—	—
When a Crooner Dies	Released: November 17, 2023; Label: BMG Rights Management; Formats: CD, digital download	—	—	—	—

=== Soundtrack albums ===
- Leap of Faith: The Musical (Original Broadway Cast Recording) (December 4, 2012)
- Venice (Original Cast Recording) (September 23, 2014)
- Hamilton (Original Broadway Cast Recording) (September 25, 2015)
- One Night in Miami... (Original Motion Picture Soundtrack) (January 15, 2021) The soundtrack features Odom's Original Song from the film, "Speak Now."

=== Singles ===
Title	Year	Album
"Good For You"	2016	non-album single
"Have Yourself a Merry Little Christmas"	2016	Simply Christmas
"America the Beautiful"	2018	non-album singles
"Without You"	2018	non-album singles
"What Are We Waiting For" (featuring Nicolette Robinson)	2018	non-album singles
"Bear Facts" (with the cast of We Bare Bears)	2018	non-album singles
"All I Want For Christmas Is You" (with Ingrid Michaelson)	2018	Ingrid Michaelson's Songs for the Season
"Under Pressure"	2019	Mr
"Go Crazy"	2020	Mr
"Cold" (featuring Sia)	2020	non-album single

=== Other appearances ===
Title	Year	Other artist(s)	Album
"Hallelujah, I Believe"	2015	Jim Brickman	Comfort & Joy: The Sweet Sounds of Christmas and A Joyful Christmas
"Joy to the World"	2015	The Broadway Cast of Hamilton	Broadway's Carols for a Cure, Vol. 17, 2015
"Autumn Leaves"	2016	N/A	Tony Bennett Celebrates 90
"Seriously"	2016	Song written by Sara Bareilles	This American Life Ep.599
"My Romance"	2017	Billy Porter	Billy Porter Presents: The Soul of Richard Rodgers
"Sondheim: Medley: Children will Listen / You've Got to Be Carefully Taught (From "Into the Woods" & "South Pacific")"	2018	Renée Fleming, BBC Concert Orchestra, & Rob Fisher	Broadway

== See also ==
- African-American Tony nominees and winners
- List of black Academy Award winners and nominees
- List of actors with Academy Award nominations
