= Strongman (film) =

Strongman is a 2009 documentary about strongman Stanley Pleskun, and his relationships with his girlfriend and his family.
