= Adolph Green =

American dramatist (1914–2002)

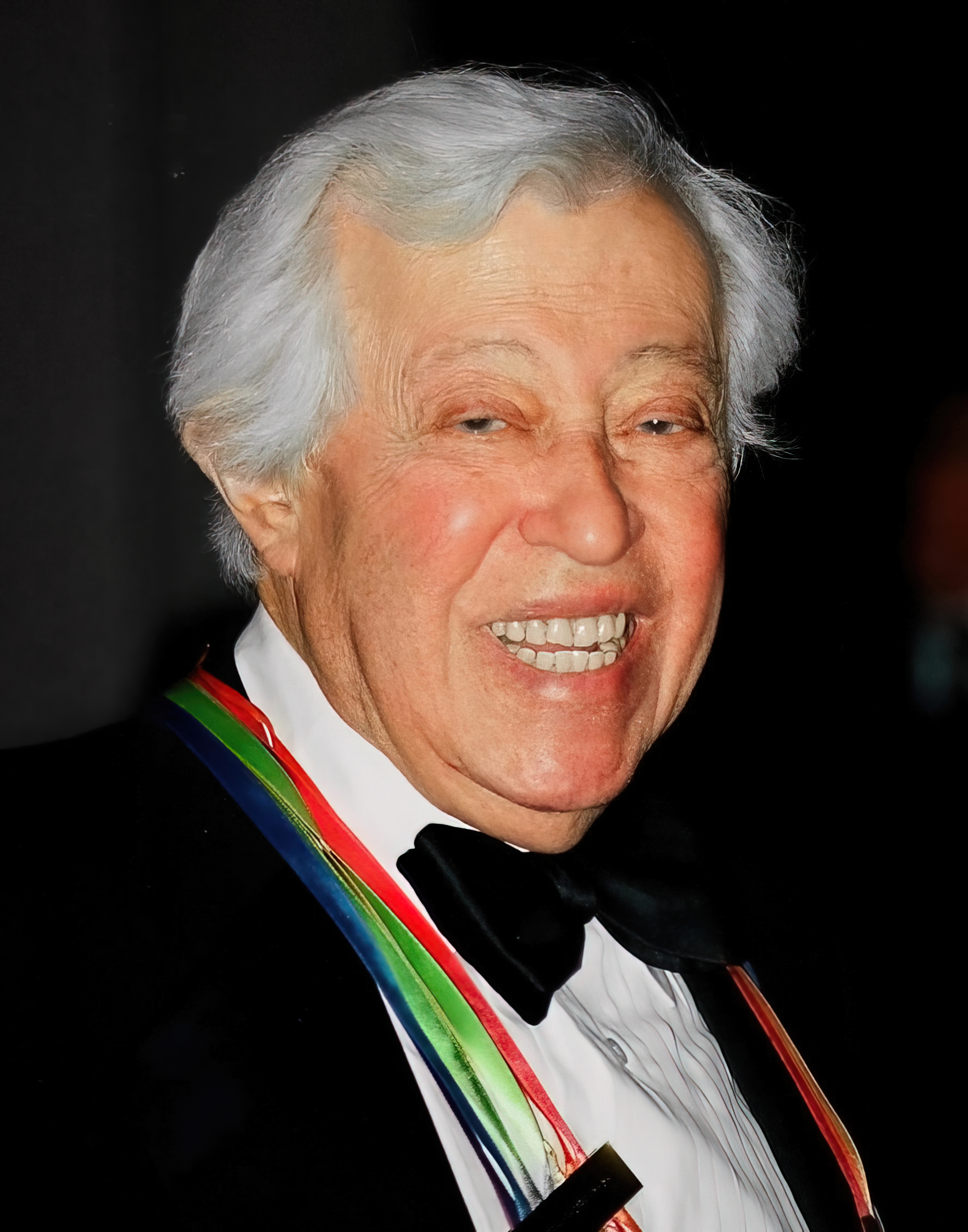
- Green wearing the Kennedy Center Honors
- Born: December 2, 1914; The Bronx, New York, U.S.
- Died: October 23, 2002 (aged 87); New York City, U.S.
- Occupations: Playwright, songwriter, actor
- Years active: 1944–2002
- Spouses: Elizabeth Reitell (m. 1941, divorced) Allyn Ann McLerie (m. 1945; div. 1953) Phyllis Newman (m. 1960)
- Children: Adam Green; Amanda Green

Adolph Green (December 2, 1914 – October 23, 2002) was an American lyricist and playwright, who with long-time collaborator Betty Comden, penned the screenplays and songs for musicals on Broadway and in Hollywood. Although they were not a romantic couple, they shared a unique comic genius and sophisticated wit that enabled them to forge a six-decade-long partnership. They received numerous accolades including four Tony Awards and nominations for two Academy Awards and a Grammy Award. Green was inducted into the Songwriters Hall of Fame in 1980 and American Theatre Hall of Fame in 1981. Comden and Green received the Kennedy Center Honor in 1991.

They started their career alongside Leonard Bernstein on stage, where they received the New York Drama Critics' Circle for Best Musical for Wonderful Town (1953). On Broadway, they wrote the music and lyrics to musicals such as On the Town (1944), Two on the Aisle (1951), Peter Pan (1954), Bells Are Ringing (1956), and Applause (1970). They won four Tony Awards as composer and lyricist for Hallelujah, Baby! (1967), On the Twentieth Century (1978), and The Will Rogers Follies (1991). As performers, they starred in A Party with Betty Comden and Adolph Green (1958).

They gained fame in film collaborating with Stanley Donen, Gene Kelly, and Vincente Minnelli as part of Arthur Freed's production unit at Metro Goldwyn Mayer. Perhaps their greatest collaboration was for the film Singin' in the Rain (1952), although they received two Academy Award nominations for screenplays for the musicals The Band Wagon (1953), and It's Always Fair Weather (1955). They also wrote the scripts for the classic movie musicals The Barkleys of Broadway (1949), On the Town (1949), Auntie Mame (1958), and Bells Are Ringing (1960).

== Early life and education ==
Green was born in the Bronx to Hungarian Jewish immigrants Helen (née Weiss) and Daniel Green. He was the youngest of three sons, with brothers Louis (circa 1907-?) and William (circa 1910-?). After high school, he worked as a runner on Wall Street while he tried to make it as an actor.

== Career ==
=== 1938–1947 ===
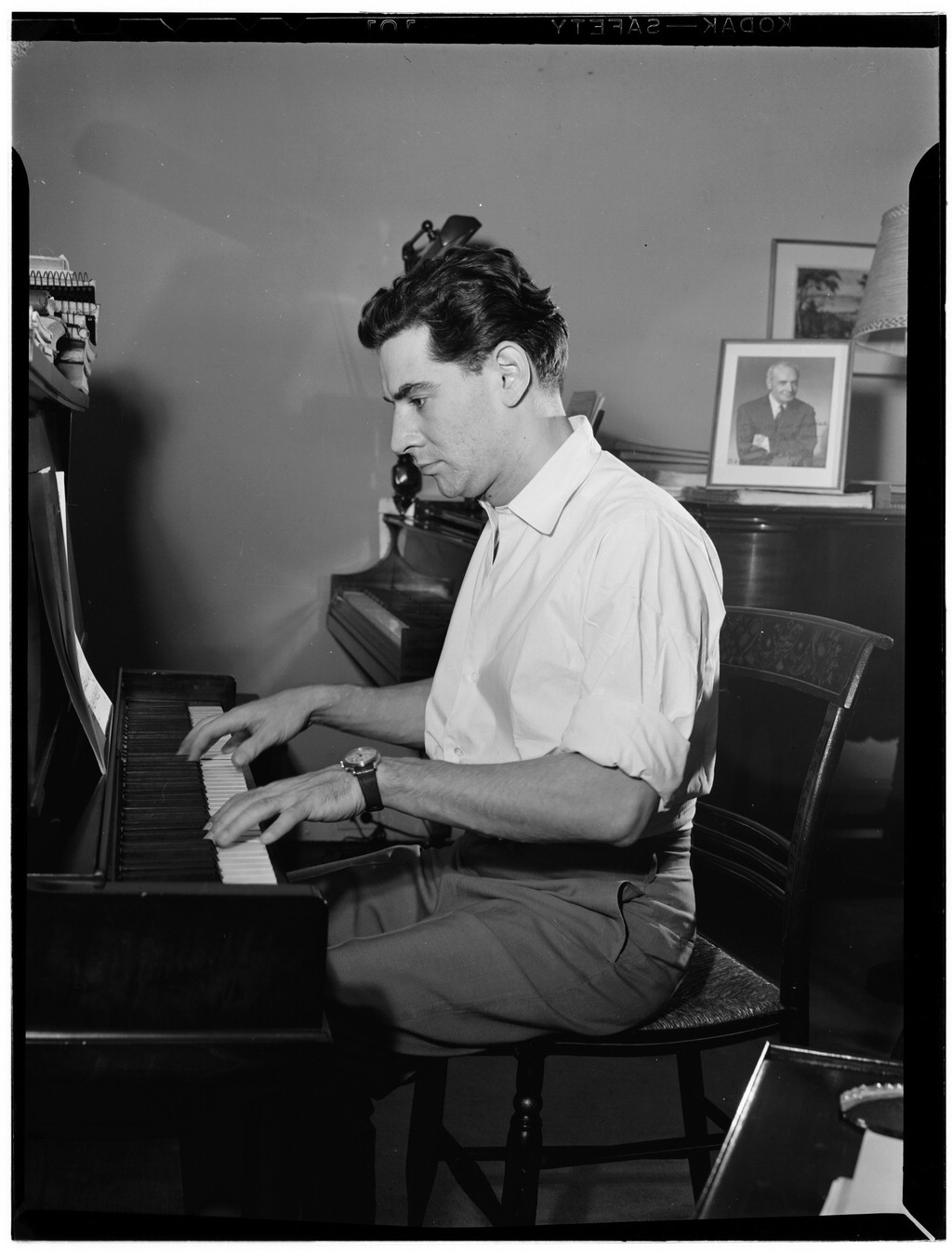
Comden and Green collaborated with Leonard Bernstein on Wonderful Town

He met Comden through mutual friends in 1938 while she was studying drama at New York University. They formed a troupe called the Revuers, which performed at the Village Vanguard, a club in Greenwich Village. Among the members of the company was a young comedian named Judy Tuvim, who later changed her name to Judy Holliday, and Green's good friend, a young musician named Leonard Bernstein, whom he had met in 1937 at Camp Onota (a summer camp in Pittsfield, MA, where Bernstein was the music counselor), frequently accompanied them on the piano. Together, Comden and Green's act earned success and a movie offer. The Revuers traveled west in hopes of finding fame in Greenwich Village, a 1944 movie starring Carmen Miranda and Don Ameche, but their roles were so small, they barely were noticed, and they quickly returned to New York City. Their first Broadway effort teamed them with Bernstein for On the Town, a musical romp about three sailors on leave in New York City that was an expansion of a ballet entitled Fancy Free on which Bernstein had been working with choreographer Jerome Robbins. Comden and Green wrote the lyrics and book, which included sizeable parts for themselves. Their next two musicals, Billion Dollar Baby (1945) and Bonanza Bound (1947) were not successful, and once again they headed to California, where they immediately found work at MGM.

=== 1948–1969 ===
They wrote the screenplay for Good News (1947), starring June Allyson and Peter Lawford, The Barkleys of Broadway for Ginger Rogers and Fred Astaire, and then adapted On the Town (1949) for Frank Sinatra and Gene Kelly, scrapping much of Bernstein's music at the request of Arthur Freed, who did not care for the Bernstein score. They reunited with Kelly for their most successful project, the classic Singin' in the Rain (1952), about Hollywood in the final days of the silent film era. The film was directed by Gene Kelly and Stanley Donen and starred Kelly, Debbie Reynolds, and Donald O'Connor. Together, Comden and Green received a nomination for the Writers Guild of America Award for Best Written Musical. Considered by many film historians to be the best movie musical of all time, it ranked number 10 on the list of the 100 best American movies of the 20th century compiled by the American Film Institute in 1998.

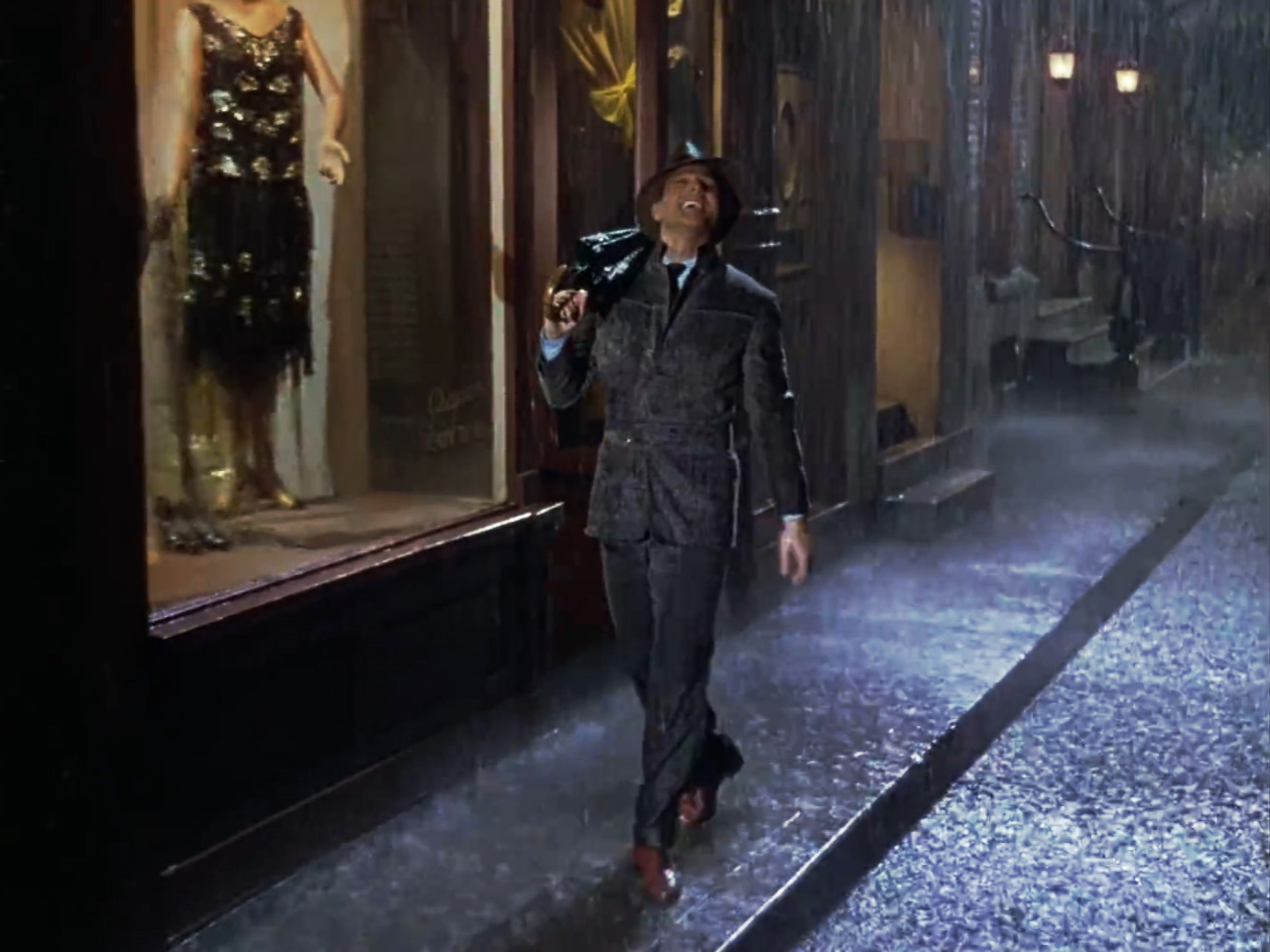
Gene Kelly in Singin' in the Rain

They followed this with another hit, and another musical The Band Wagon (1953), in which the characters of Lester and Lily, a husband-and-wife team who writes the play for the show-within-a-show, were patterned after themselves. The film was directed by Vincente Minnelli and starred Fred Astaire, Cyd Charisse, Nanette Fabray, and Oscar Levant. They reunited with Donen and Kelly with another musical It's Always Fair Weather (1955). They were Oscar-nominated twice, for their screenplays for The Band Wagon and It's Always Fair Weather, both of which earned them a Screen Writers Guild Award, as did On the Town. Their stage work during the next few years included the revue Two on the Aisle (1951), starring Bert Lahr and Dolores Gray, Wonderful Town (1953), an adaptation of the comedy hit My Sister Eileen, with Rosalind Russell and Edie Adams as two sisters from Ohio trying to make it in the Big Apple, and Bells Are Ringing (1956), which reunited them with Judy Holliday as an operator at a telephone answering service. The score, including the standards "Just in Time", "Long Before I Knew You", and "The Party's Over" proved to be one of their richest.

Comden and Green returned to films with Morton DaCosta's Auntie Mame (1958) starring Rosalind Russell and Minnelli's Bells Are Ringing (1961) starring Judy Holliday and Dean Martin. In 1958, they appeared on Broadway in A Party with Betty Comden and Adolph Green, a revue that included some of their early sketches. It was a critical and commercial success, and they brought an updated version back to Broadway in 1977. In 1964 they wrote the screenplay for the black comedy What a Way to Go! starring Shirley MacLaine, Paul Newman, Robert Mitchum, Dean Martin, Gene Kelly, and Dick Van Dyke. The film was a commercial success but received mixed reviews.

=== 1970–2002 ===
Among their other credits are the Mary Martin version of Peter Pan for both Broadway and television, a streamlined Die Fledermaus for the Metropolitan Opera, and stage musicals for Carol Burnett, Leslie Uggams, and Lauren Bacall, among others. Their many collaborators included Garson Kanin, Cy Coleman, Jule Styne, and André Previn. The team was not without its failures. In 1982, A Doll's Life, an exploration of what Nora did after she abandoned her husband in Henrik Ibsen's A Doll's House, ran for only five performances, although they received Tony Award nominations for its book and score. In 1980, Green was inducted into the Songwriters Hall of Fame. And, in 1981, he was inducted into the American Theatre Hall of Fame. The following year Green appeared in the comedy My Favorite Year (1982) starring Peter O'Toole. The next year, they wrote the book for the musical Singin' in the Rain for the West End in London in 1983 and then for Broadway in 1985. The production earned two Tony Award nominations including for Best Book of a Musical for Comden and Green.

In 1989, he appeared as Dr. Pangloss in Bernstein's Candide. Comden and Green received Kennedy Center Honors in 1991. Also in 1991, they returned to Broadway in with the musical The Will Rogers Follies. The musical focuses on the life and career of famed humorist and performer Will Rogers, using as a backdrop the Ziegfeld Follies. The production earned six Tony Awards, including the Tony Award for Best Musical and the Tony Award for Best Original Score for Comden and Green.

== Personal life ==
Green was married to actress Allyn Ann McLerie from 1945 to 1953.

Green's third wife was actress Phyllis Newman, who had understudied Holliday in Bells Are Ringing. They married in 1960, and remained so until Green's death in 2002. The couple had two children, Adam and Amanda, both of whom are songwriters.

His Broadway memorial, with Lauren Bacall, Kevin Kline, Joel Grey, Kristin Chenoweth, Arthur Laurents, Peter Stone, and Betty Comden in attendance, was held at the Shubert Theater on December 4, 2002.

== Credits ==
=== Broadway ===
- On the Town (1944)
- Billion Dollar Baby (1945)
- Two on the Aisle (1951)
- Wonderful Town (1953)
- Peter Pan (1954)
- Bells Are Ringing (1956)
- Say, Darling (1958)
- A Party with Betty Comden and Adolph Green (1958)
- Do Re Mi (1960)
- Subways Are for Sleeping (1961)
- Fade Out – Fade In (1964)
- Hallelujah, Baby! (1967)
- Applause (1970)
- Lorelei (1974)
- On the Twentieth Century (1978)
- The Madwoman of Central Park West (1979)
- A Doll's Life (1982)
- Singin' in the Rain (1985)
- The Will Rogers Follies (1991)

=== Hollywood ===
- Good News (1947)
- The Barkleys of Broadway (1949)
- On the Town (1949)
- Singin' in the Rain (1952)
- The Band Wagon (1953)
- It's Always Fair Weather (1955)
- Auntie Mame (1958)
- Bells Are Ringing (1960)
- What a Way to Go! (1964)
- My Favorite Year (1982)

Acting credits

- Greenwich Village (1944) as Revuer (uncredited)
- Simon (1980) as Commune Leader
- My Favorite Year (1982) as Leo Silver
- Lily in Love (1984) as Jerry Silber
- Garbo Talks (1984) as himself
- I Want to Go Home (1989) as Joey Wellman
- Candide (1991, TV Movie) as Dr. Pangloss / Martin
- Frasier (1994, TV Series) as Walter (voice)
- The Substance of Fire (1996) as Mr. Musselblatt (final film role)

== Awards and nominations ==
Year	Award	Category	Work	Result
1950	WGA Award	Best Written American Musical	The Barkleys of Broadway	Nominated
1950	WGA Award	Best Written American Musical	On the Town	Won
1953	WGA Award	Best Written American Musical	Singin' in the Rain	Won
1953	New York Drama Critics' Circle Award	Best Musical	Wonderful Town	Won
1954	Academy Awards	Best Writing, Story and Screenplay	The Band Wagon	Nominated
1954	WGA Award	Best Written American Musical	The Band Wagon	Nominated
1956	Academy Awards	Best Writing, Story and Screenplay	It's Always Fair Weather	Nominated
1956	WGA Award	Best Written American Musical	It's Always Fair Weather	Nominated
1961	WGA Award	Best Written American Musical	Bells Are Ringing	Won
1961	Grammy Award	Best Soundtrack Album	Bells Are Ringing	Nominated
1968	Tony Award	Best Composer and Lyricist	Hallelujah, Baby!	Won
1978	Tony Award	Best Book of a Musical	On the Twentieth Century	Won
1978	Tony Award	Best Original Score	On the Twentieth Century	Won
1983	Tony Award	Best Book of a Musical	A Doll's House	Nominated
1983	Tony Award	Best Original Score	A Doll's House	Nominated
1986	Tony Award	Best Book of a Musical	Singin' in the Rain	Nominated
1991	Tony Award	Best Original Score	The Will Rogers Follies	Won
1991	New York Drama Critics' Circle Award	Best Musical	The Will Rogers Follies	Won
1995	National Board of Review Award	Distinction in Screenwriting		Won
2001	WGA Award	Laurel Award for Screen Writing Achievement		Won
