= Judy Holliday =

American actress and singer (1921–1965)

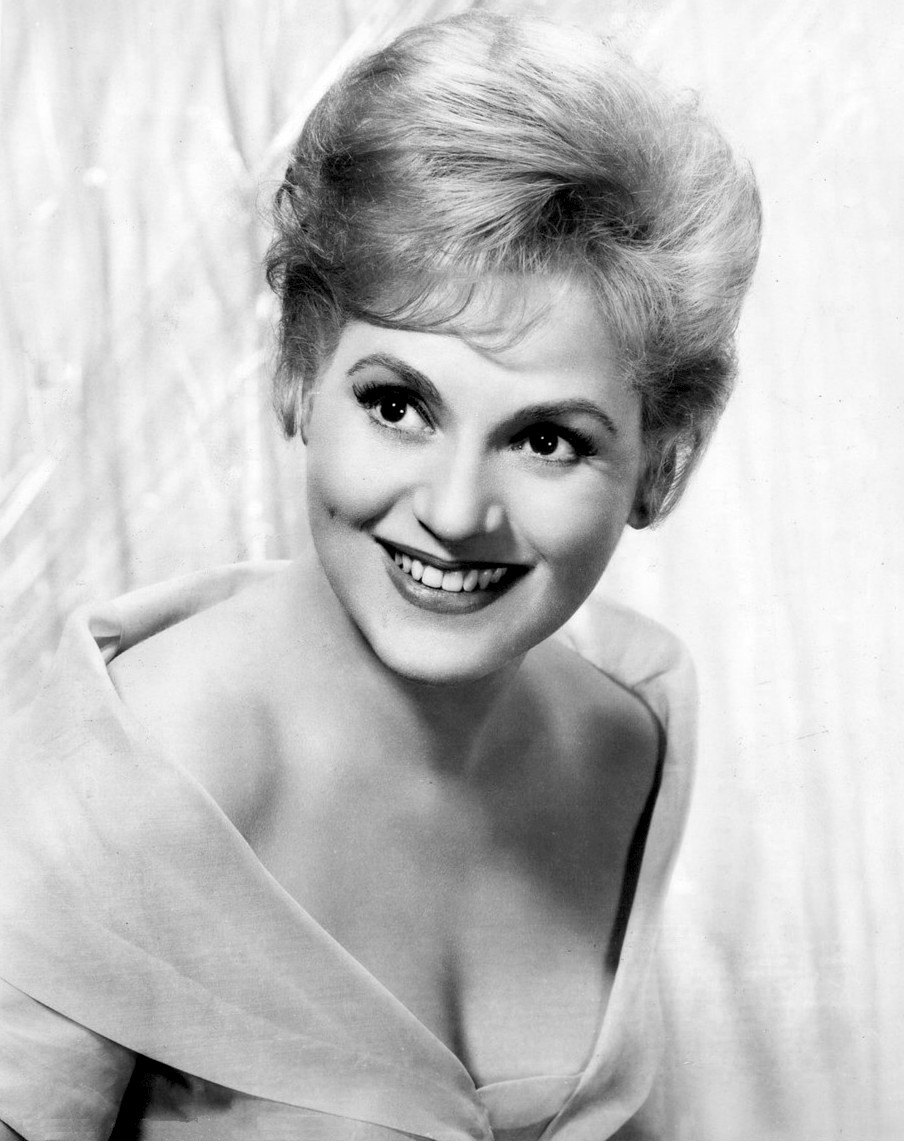
- Holliday in 1960
- Born: Judith Tuvim; June 21, 1921; Queens, New York City, U.S.
- Died: June 7, 1965 (aged 43); Manhattan, New York City, U.S.
- Resting place: Westchester Hills Cemetery
- Occupation: Actress
- Years active: 1938–1963
- Spouse: David Oppenheim (m. 1948; div. 1957)
- Partner: Gerry Mulligan (1958–1965; her death)
- Children: Jonathan Oppenheim

Judy Holliday (born Judith Tuvim, June 21, 1921 – June 7, 1965) was an American actress, comedian, singer, and songwriter.

She began her career as part of a nightclub act before working in Broadway plays and musicals. Her success as Billie Dawn in the 1946 stage production of Born Yesterday led to her being cast in the 1950 film version, for which she won an Academy Award for Best Actress and a Golden Globe Award for Best Actress in a Motion Picture – Musical or Comedy. She was known for her performance on Broadway in the musical Bells Are Ringing, winning a Tony Award for Best Actress in a Musical and reprising her role in the 1960 film adaptation.

In 1952, Holliday was called to testify before the Senate Internal Security Subcommittee to answer claims she was associated with communism. Unlike other figures who lost standing, Holliday managed to get through unscathed. She continued to act on Broadway and film until her death from breast cancer in 1965.

== Early life ==
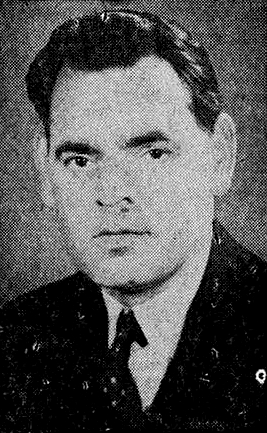
Holliday's father Abe as he appeared in The Jewish Daily Forward, January 18, 1950

Holliday was born Judith Tuvim in Queens, New York, the only child of Abe and Helen (née Gollomb) Tuvim. She took her stage name from yamim tovim, which is Hebrew for "holidays". Her father was executive director of the foundation for the Jewish National Fund of America (1951–1958), and a political activist who ran unsuccessfully six times between 1919 and 1938 as a Socialist Party candidate for the New York State Legislature. Her mother taught piano. Both were of Russian-Jewish descent. Judith grew up in Sunnyside, Queens, New York, and graduated from Julia Richman High School in Manhattan. Her first job was as an assistant switchboard operator at the Mercury Theatre, which was administered by Orson Welles and John Houseman.

== Early career ==
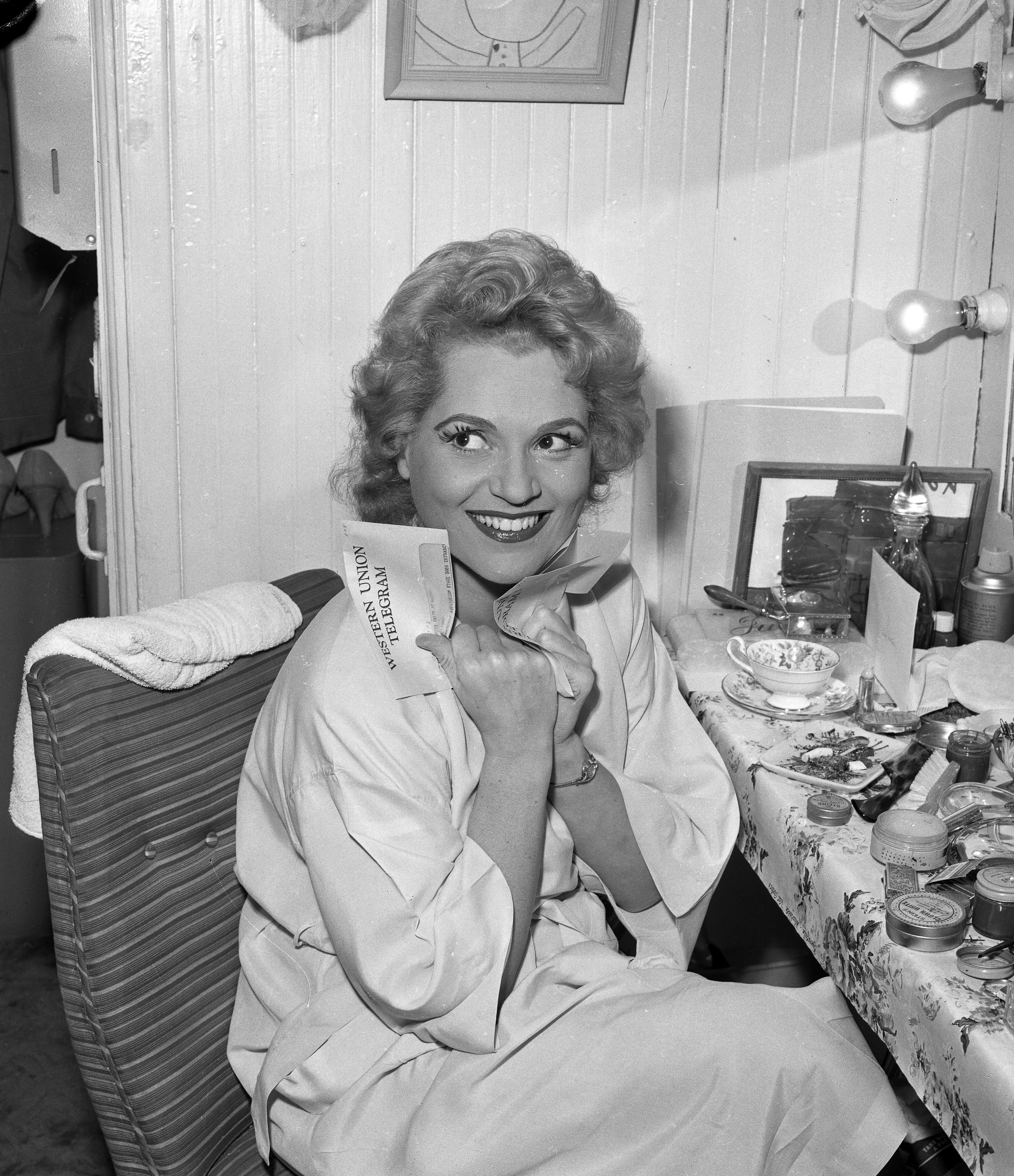
Holliday in her dressing room, Los Angeles Civic Light Opera, 1959

Holliday began her show business career in 1938 as part of a nightclub act called The Revuers, whose other members were Betty Comden, Adolph Green, Alvin Hammer, John Frank and Esther Cohen. They played engagements in New York night clubs including the Village Vanguard, Spivy's Roof, the Blue Angel, and the Rainbow Room, and the Trocadero in Hollywood, California. Leonard Bernstein, a friend of the group who shared an apartment with Green, occasionally provided piano accompaniment for their performances. In 1940, The Revuers released a 78-rpm album entitled Night Life in New York. The troupe filmed a scene for the 1944 Carmen Miranda movie Greenwich Village. Although the Revuers' performance was cut, Holliday was an unbilled extra in another scene. The group disbanded in early 1944. Holliday remembered her years in the Revuers as unpleasant, saying she was initially a bad actress and so shy that she vomited between shows. She found it difficult to perform on stage in smoke-filled rooms while patrons over-imbibed, heckled, and fought with each other, but deemed entertainers successful if they persevered in such atmospheres.

In her first film role, Holliday played an airman's wife in Twentieth Century Fox’s version of the U.S. Army Air Forces' play Winged Victory (1944). She made her Broadway debut on March 20, 1945, at the Belasco Theatre in Kiss Them for Me, and was one of the recipients that year of the Clarence Derwent Award for Most Promising Female actor.

In 1946, she returned to Broadway as the scatterbrained Billie Dawn in Born Yesterday. Author Garson Kanin wrote the play for Jean Arthur; but when Arthur left New York for personal reasons, Kanin selected Holliday, two decades Arthur's junior, as her replacement. When Columbia bought the rights to adapt Born Yesterday to film, studio boss Harry Cohn initially would not consider casting the Hollywood unknown, even though Holliday received rave reviews for her Broadway performance. Kanin, along with George Cukor, Spencer Tracy, and Katharine Hepburn conspired to promote Holliday by offering her a key part in the Tracy-Hepburn film Adam's Rib (1949).

Cohn eventually relented and offered Holliday the chance to repeat her role for the film version, but only after a screen test (which at first was used only as a "benchmark against which to evaluate" other actresses being considered for the role). For her film performance in Born Yesterday, Holliday won the first Golden Globe Award for Best Actress in a Motion Picture – Musical or Comedy; and at the 23rd Academy Awards, won the Academy Award for Best Actress, defeating Gloria Swanson, nominated for Sunset Boulevard; Eleanor Parker, for Caged; and Bette Davis and Anne Baxter, both for All About Eve.

Holliday starred opposite newcomer Jack Lemmon in his first two feature films, the comedies It Should Happen to You and Phffft (both 1954), earning two nominations for the BAFTA Award for Best Foreign Actress for both projects.

Film historian Bernard Dick summed up Holliday's acting: "Perhaps the most important aspect of the Judy Holliday persona, both in variations of Billie Dawn and in her roles as housewife, is her vulnerability...her ability to shift her mood quickly from comic to serious is one of her greatest technical gifts." Director George Cukor also observed that Holliday had "that depth of emotion, that unexpectedly touching emotion, that thing which would unexpectedly touch your heart."

=== Investigation for communist sympathies ===
In 1950, Holliday's name appeared on a list of 151 alleged pro-communist artists in the publication Red Channels: The Report of Communist Influence in Radio and TV. The next year, she was subpoenaed by Senator Pat McCarran's Senate Internal Security Subcommittee, which was investigating subversion and communist activity in the entertainment industry. Holliday was one of several actors accused of fundraising for communist front organizations. She appeared before the committee on March 26, 1952, with Simon H. Rifkind as her legal counsel.

Holliday was advised to play dumb, as in her film portrayal of Billie Dawn, and she did, often to comedic effect. She denounced Stalinism and authoritarianism generally, but defended the free-speech rights of those who espoused such views. Holliday later wrote of the experience to her friend Heywood Hale Broun: "Woodie, maybe you're ashamed of me, because I played Billie Dawn ... But I'm not ashamed of myself, because I didn't name names. That much I preserved." The investigation "did not reveal positive evidence of any membership in the Communist Party". The investigation concluded after three months and, unlike others whose careers were severely damaged by communist allegations, her career was relatively untarnished.

== Later career ==
Holliday starred in the film version of The Solid Gold Cadillac, which was released in August 1956. In November 1956, Holliday returned to Broadway, starring in the musical Bells Are Ringing with book and lyrics by her Revuers friends Betty Comden and Adolph Green and directed by Jerome Robbins. In 1957, she won the Tony Award for Best Actress in a Musical. Of Holliday's performance in the stage musical, Brooks Atkinson wrote in The New York Times:

Nothing has happened to the shrill little moll whom the town loved in Born Yesterday. The squeaky voice, the embarrassed giggle, the brassy naivete, the dimples, the teeter-totter walk fortunately remain unimpaired ... Miss Holliday now adds a trunk-full of song-and-dance routines...Without losing any of that doll-like personality, she is now singing music by Jule Styne and dancing numbers composed by Jerome Robbins and Bob Fosse. She has gusto enough to triumph in every kind of music hall antic.

Returning to her film career after a gap of several years, Holliday starred in the film version of Bells Are Ringing (1960), her last film.

In October 1960, Holliday started out-of-town tryouts on the play Laurette, based on the life of Laurette Taylor. The show was directed by José Quintero with background music by Elmer Bernstein and produced by Alan Pakula. When Holliday became ill and had to leave the show, it closed in Philadelphia without opening on Broadway.

Holliday had surgery for a throat tumor shortly after leaving the production in October 1960. Her last role was in the stage musical Hot Spot, costarring newcomers such as Joseph Campanella and Mary Louise Wilson, which closed after 43 performances on May 25, 1963.

== Personal life ==
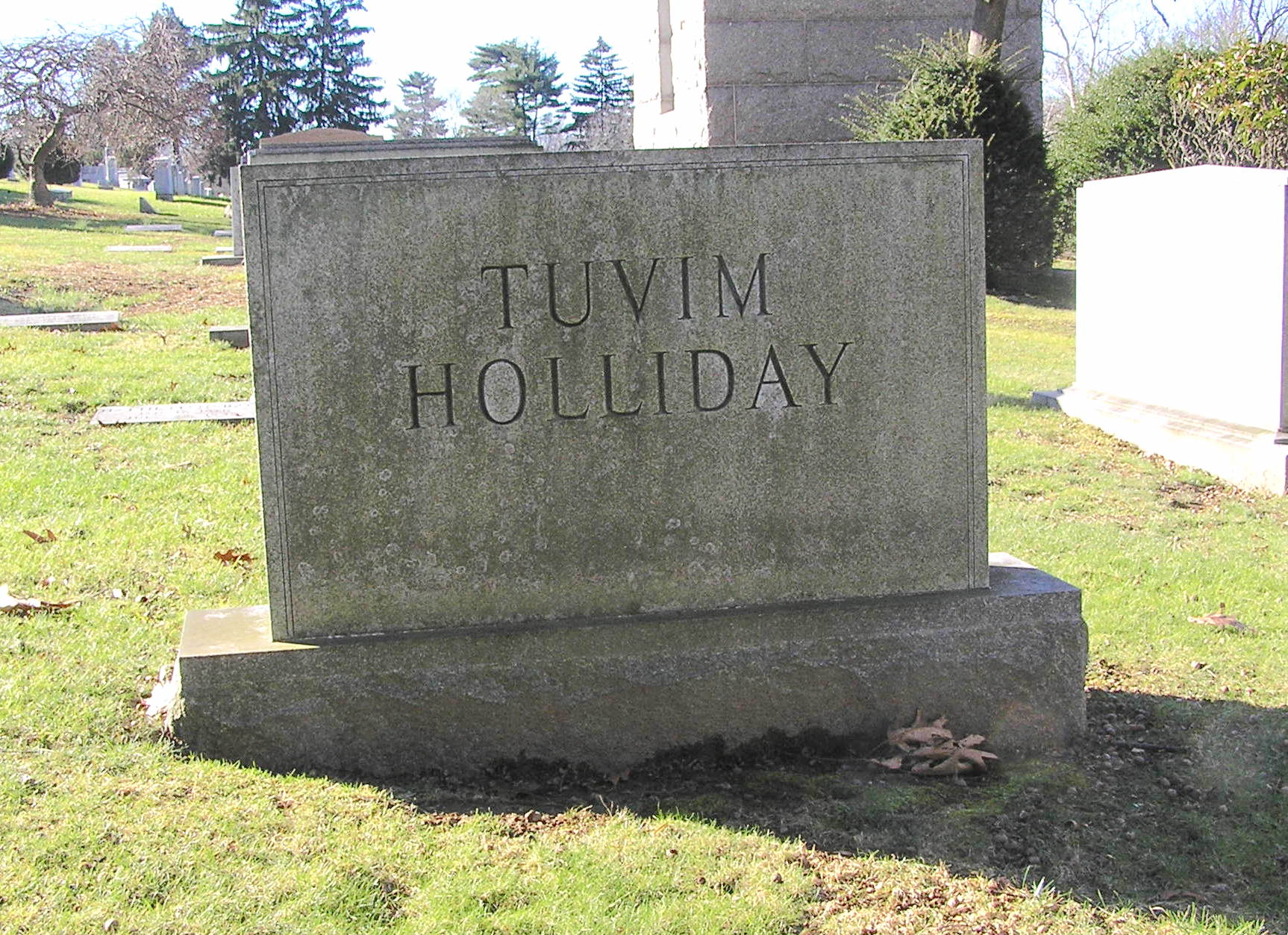
Holliday's grave in Westchester Hills Cemetery

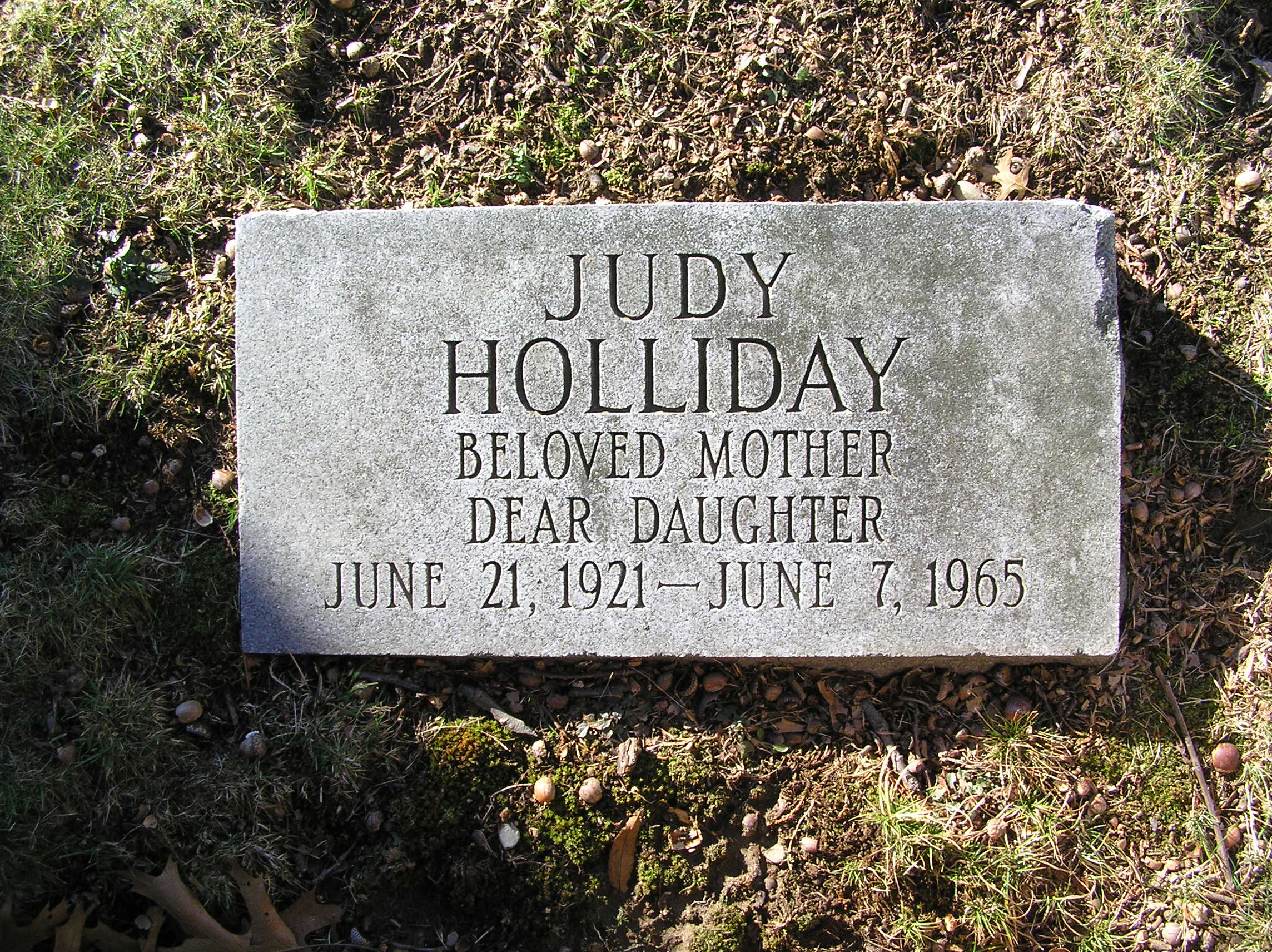
The footstone at Holliday's grave

In 1948, Holliday married clarinetist David Oppenheim, later a classical music and television producer, and academic. The couple had one child, Jonathan, before they divorced in 1957. In the late 1950s, Holliday had a long-term relationship with jazz musician Gerry Mulligan.

In 1960, she was awarded a star on the Hollywood Walk of Fame at 6901 Hollywood Boulevard in Los Angeles.

== Death ==
Holliday died on June 7, 1965, at Manhattan's Mount Sinai Hospital from metastatic breast cancer. She was interred in the Westchester Hills Cemetery in Hastings-on-Hudson, New York.

== Filmography ==
Year	Film	Role	Other notes
1938	Too Much Johnson	Extra	short subject
1944	Greenwich Village	Revuer	scene cut, but Holliday is still visible as an uncredited extra
1944	Something for the Boys	Defense plant welder	uncredited bit role
1944	Winged Victory	Ruth Miller	
1949	Adam's Rib	Doris Attinger	Nominated—Golden Globe Award for Best Supporting Actress – Motion Picture
1949	On the Town	Daisy (Simpkins' MGM date)	uncredited, voice only
1950	Born Yesterday	Emma "Billie" Dawn	Academy Award for Best Actress; Golden Globe Award for Best Actress in a Motion Picture – Musical or Comedy; Jussi Award Diploma of Merit for Best Foreign Actress; New York Film Critics Circle Award for Best Actress (2nd place); Nominated—Golden Globe Award for Best Actress in a Motion Picture – Drama
1952	The Marrying Kind	"Florrie" Keefer	Nominated—BAFTA Award for Best Foreign Actress
1954	It Should Happen to You	Gladys Glover	
1954	Phffft	Nina Tracey née Chapman	Nominated—BAFTA Award for Best Foreign Actress
1956	The Solid Gold Cadillac	Laura Partridge	Nominated—Golden Globe Award for Best Actress in a Motion Picture – Musical or Comedy
1956	Full of Life	Emily Rocco	
1960	Bells Are Ringing	Ella Peterson	Nominated—Golden Globe Award for Best Actress in a Motion Picture – Musical or Comedy

== Radio appearances ==
Year	Program	Episode	Co-stars
1948	Ford Theater	My Sister Eileen	Shirley Booth & Virginia Gilmore
1951	The Big Show	n/a	Fred Allen & Eddie Cantor
1951	The Big Show	n/a	Fred Allen & Robert Cummings
1951	The Big Show	n/a	Tallulah Bankhead & Jack Haley
1951	The Big Show	n/a	Jimmy Durante & Carmen Miranda
1951	Hear It Now	The Human Tick	Edward R. Murrow (host)
1951	The Big Show	n/a	Groucho Marx & Bob Hope
1951	The Big Show	n/a	Tallulah Bankhead & Fred Allen
1957	Recollections At 30	Ladies Night	The Revuers (from 1940)

== Stage ==
Year	Production	Role	Notes
1942	My Dear Public		with The Revuers
1945	Kiss Them for Me	Alice	
1946	Born Yesterday	Billie Dawn	
1951	Dream Girl	Georgina Allerton	
1956	Bells Are Ringing	Ella Peterson	Tony Award for Best Actress in a Musical
1960	Laurette	Laurette Taylor	Closed out-of-town
1963	Hot Spot	Sally Hopwinder	

== Discography ==
Holliday recorded two studio albums (not including her film and Broadway soundtracks) during her lifetime.

- Trouble Is a Man (1958)
- Holliday with Mulligan (DRG, recorded 1961, released 1980) with Gerry Mulligan
