= Stanley Donen filmography =

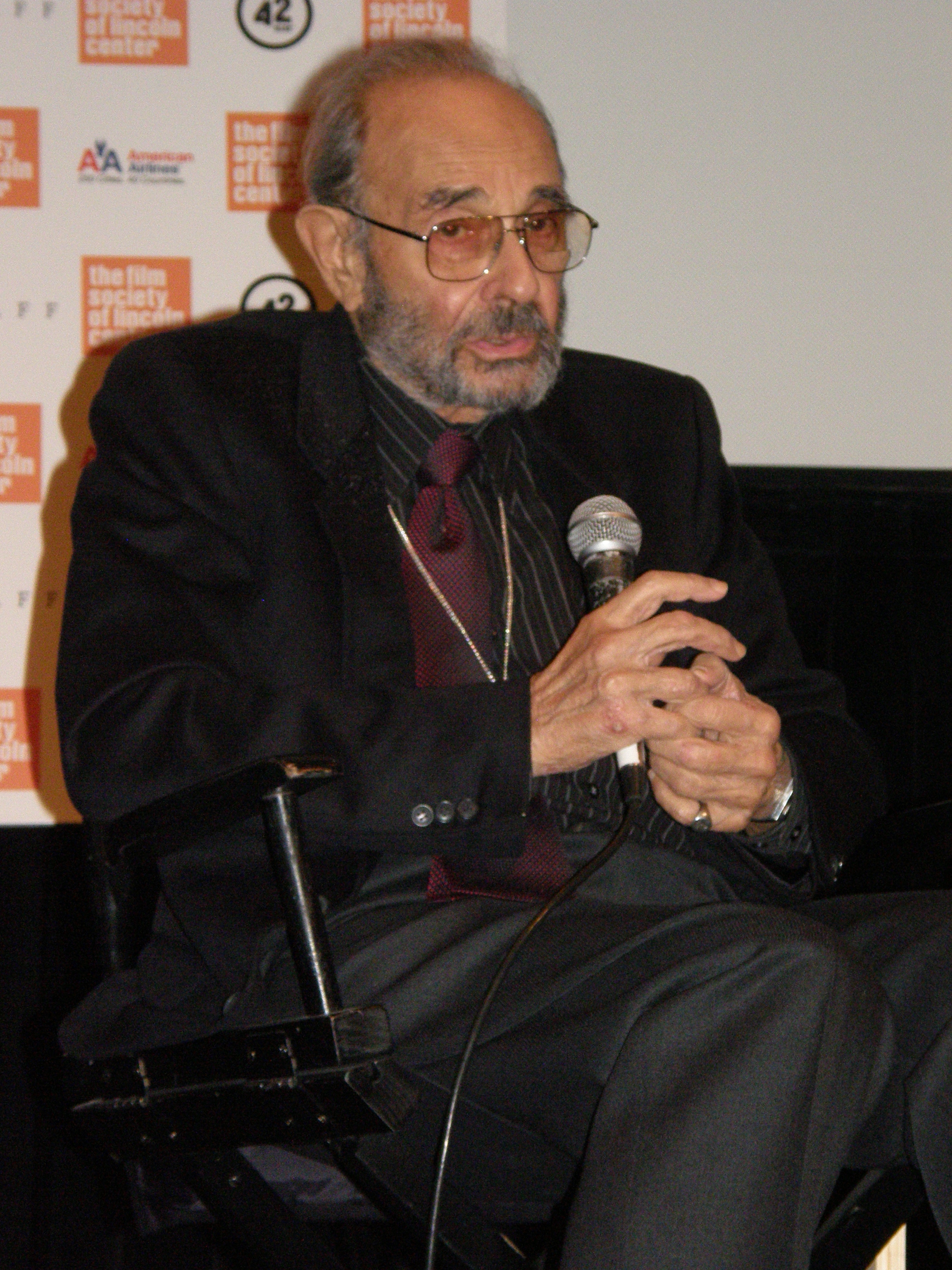
Donen in 2010

Stanley Donen (/ˈdɒnən/ DON-ən; April 13, 1924 – February 21, 2019) was an American film director and choreographer, and occasionally worked in the American theater. He has directed 28 feature films and worked on various other films or television projects, often as a choreographer. He began his career in the chorus line on Broadway for director George Abbott, where he befriended Gene Kelly. Shortly afterwards he moved to Hollywood and collaborated with Kelly on numerous films as a choreographer until they became co-directors on his feature film debut On the Town. In 1952 Donen and Kelly co-directed the musical Singin' in the Rain, regarded as one of the greatest films ever made. He went on to direct hit films for several decades thereafter, many of which are currently regarded as classics. He has won numerous awards for his life's work, most notably an Honorary Academy Award in 1998 and a Career Golden Lion from the Venice Film Festival in 2004.

== Filmography ==
=== As director ===
| Year | Title | Notes | Ref. |
|---|---|---|---|
| 1949 | On the Town | Co-directed with Gene Kelly | |
| 1951 | Royal Wedding | | |
| 1952 | Love Is Better Than Ever | | |
| 1952 | Singin' in the Rain | Co-directed with Gene Kelly also choreographer | |
| 1952 | Fearless Fagan | | |
| 1953 | Give a Girl a Break | Also choreographer | |
| 1954 | Seven Brides for Seven Brothers | | |
| 1954 | Deep in My Heart | | |
| 1955 | It's Always Fair Weather | Co-directed with Gene Kelly also choreographer | |
| 1957 | Funny Face | | |
| 1957 | The Pajama Game | Co-directed with George Abbott also producer | |
| 1957 | Kiss Them for Me | | |
| 1958 | Indiscreet | Also producer | |
| 1958 | Damn Yankees! | Co-directed with George Abbott also producer | |
| 1960 | Once More, with Feeling! | Also producer | |
| 1960 | Surprise Package | Also producer | |
| 1960 | The Grass Is Greener | Also producer | |
| 1963 | Charade | Also producer | |
| 1966 | Arabesque | Also producer | |
| 1967 | Two for the Road | Also producer | |
| 1967 | Bedazzled | Also producer | |
| 1969 | Staircase | Also producer | |
| 1974 | The Little Prince | Also producer | |
| 1975 | Lucky Lady | | |
| 1978 | Movie Movie | Also producer | |
| 1980 | Saturn 3 | Also producer | |
| 1984 | Blame It on Rio | Also producer | |
| 1999 | Love Letters | Television movie | |

=== As choreographer ===
| Year | Title | Notes | Ref. |
|---|---|---|---|
| 1943 | Best Foot Forward | Edward Buzzell | |
| 1944 | Cover Girl | Charles Vidor | |
| 1944 | Hey, Rookie | Charles Barton | |
| 1944 | Jam Session | Charles Barton | |
| 1944 | Kansas City Kitty | Del Lord | |
| 1945 | Anchors Aweigh | George Sidney | |
| 1945 | Holiday in Mexico | George Sidney | |
| 1946 | No Leave, No Love | Charles Martin | |
| 1947 | Living in a Big Way | Gregory La Cava | |
| 1947 | This Time for Keeps | Richard Thorpe | |
| 1947 | Killer McCoy | Roy Rowland | |
| 1948 | Big City | Norman Taurog | |
| 1948 | A Date with Judy | Richard Thorpe | |
| 1948 | The Kissing Bandit | Laslo Benedek | |
| 1949 | Take Me Out to the Ball Game | Busby Berkeley | |
| 1951 | Double Dynamite | Irving Cummings | |
| 1953 | Sombrero | Norman Foster | |

=== Other work ===
| Year | Title | Notes | Director | Ref. |
|---|---|---|---|---|
| 1943 | Best Foot Forward | Chorus dancer | Edward Buzzell | |
| 1949 | Take Me Out to the Ball Game | Co-wrote the original story with Gene Kelly | Busby Berkeley | |
| 1955 | Kismet | Uncredited director of the last three days of shooting & re-shoots when director Vincent Minnelli left the production | Vincent Minnelli | |
| 1986 | Moonlighting | Television episode: "Big Man on Mulberry Street", directed dance sequences | Christian I. Nyby II, Stanley Donen | |
| 1986 | Dancing on the Ceiling | Directed the music video for the Lionel Richie song | Stanley Donen | |
| 1986 | 58th Academy Awards | Producer of the Academy Awards ceremony | Marty Pasetta | |
| 2000 | Love's Labour's Lost | Presenter (U.S. release) | Kenneth Branagh | |
| 2010 | Stanley Donen: You Just Do It | Interviewee, documentary feature on Donen's life and career | Clara Kuperberg, Julia Kuperberg | |

== Stage work ==
| Dates | Title | Role/Position | Venues | Notes | Ref. |
|---|---|---|---|---|---|
| 1940-41 | Pal Joey | Albert Doane, dancer | Ethel Barrymore Theatre | | |
| 1941-42 | Best Foot Forward | Ensemble, dancing boy, asst. choreography | Ethel Barrymore Theatre | | |
| 1942 | Beat the Band | Stage manager, assistant choreographer | 46th Street Theatre | | |
| 1946-48 | Call Me Mister | Additional choreography | Majestic Theatre | Uncredited | |
| 1985-86 | Singin' in the Rain | Original film choreography | Gershwin Theatre | | |
| 1993 | The Red Shoes | Director | Gershwin Theatre | | |
| 2002-03 | Adult Entertainment | Director, choreographer | Variety Arts Theatre | Written by Elaine May | |

== Bibliography ==
- Casper, Joseph A. (1983). Stanley Donen. Scarecrow Press. ISBN 0810816156.
- Silverman, Stephen M. (1996). Dancing on the Ceiling: Stanley Donen and His Movies. New York: Knopf. ISBN 0679414126.
- Wakeman, John (1988). World Film Directors, Volume 2. The H. W. Wilson Company. pp. 273–282. ISBN 0824207637.
