= Two for the Road (film) =

1967 British film by Stanley Donen

- Theatrical release poster
- Directed by: Stanley Donen
- Screenplay by: Frederic Raphael
- Produced by: Stanley Donen
- Starring: Audrey Hepburn; Albert Finney; Eleanor Bron; William Daniels; Claude Dauphin; Nadia Gray
- Cinematography: Christopher Challis
- Edited by: Madeleine Gug; Richard Marden
- Music by: Henry Mancini
- Production company: Stanley Donen Films
- Distributed by: 20th Century Fox
- Release dates: 27 April 1967 (New York City); 31 August 1967 (London)
- Running time: 111 minutes
- Countries: United Kingdom; United States
- Language: English
- Budget: $4 million or $5.08 million
- Box office: $12 million $3.5 million (rentals)

Two for the Road is a 1967 romantic comedy-drama directed and produced by Stanley Donen, starring Audrey Hepburn and Albert Finney. The film tells the story of a married couple who reflect on their twelve-year relationship while on a road trip from England to the French Riviera. As they survey their foundering marriage in the present, the evolution of their relationship reveals itself through vignettes from four previous trips they took along the same route. The film was made from an original screenplay by Frederic Raphael. Supporting cast members include Eleanor Bron, William Daniels, Claude Dauphin, and Nadia Gray. Two for the Road was Hepburn's penultimate performance before her semi-retirement in 1968.

Raphael conceived the idea for the film while driving with his wife to the south of France. He suggested the project initially to producer Joseph Janni, who declined it, and then wrote the script for Donen. Originally the film was to be distributed by Universal, but after the studio backed out, Donen took the project to Twentieth Century-Fox. Two for the Road is notable for combining the styles of a traditional Hollywood romance with elements of the French New Wave. Cars figure prominently in the film and, when the narrative jumps in time, help to establish the current year. Two for the Road was a rare Hepburn picture in that she did not wear a wardrobe designed by Hubert de Givenchy, because Donen wanted her to have a more conventional appearance. The film's soundtrack was composed by Henry Mancini, who called the theme song his favourite piece of music he wrote. Principal photography began on 3 May 1966 and concluded on 1 September. The film was released on 27 April 1967 at Radio City Music Hall in New York City.

Upon its release the film received mostly positive reviews but failed to make a profit. Its mixed response was in large part due to its experimental, non-linear structure, and coalescence of commercial and artistic filmmaking. Additionally, Hepburn's role as a wife and mother in a collapsing marriage was a radical departure from the ingénues she typically had played hitherto. In subsequent years, the film's reputation has grown substantially, with numerous authors citing it as Donen's greatest film, and Hepburn's performance as the best of her career.

== Plot ==
In 1966, English architect Mark Wallace and his wife Joanna fly to France (when he thinks he forgot his passport, his wife hands it to him casually) then drive to Saint-Tropez to meet Mark's longtime client, Maurice Dalbret. Joanna complains that Mark is constantly at Maurice's beck and call, and Mark points out she enjoys the luxuries his hard work provides. They reflect on previous trips.

In 1954 Mark and Joanna cross paths on a ferry leaving England. Mark is studying European architecture, while Joanna is travelling with her choir to a festival in Menton. When the ferry arrives in Dieppe, Mark panics thinking he lost his passport; helpful bystander Joanna finds it in his backpack. When the choir's van runs off the road, Mark stops to help. He travels with the girls to Abbeville, intending to pair off with the beautiful Jackie, but after everyone else catches chickenpox, Joanna attaches herself to Mark. Mark tries to ditch Joanna, suggesting they travel separately. After hitching a ride with a slick driver in an Alfa Romeo, Joanna returns to join Mark, telling him that she loves him. He warns her that he does not intend commitment. At the Mediterranean, they stay in cheap hotels, spending their days at the beach, and Joanna proves to be an adaptable and ideal companion. At the end of their week, Mark asks Joanna to marry him.

In 1957 the Wallaces have been married for two years. They travel by car with Mark's former girlfriend from the University of Chicago, Cathy Seligman, her husband, Howard Maxwell-Manchester, and their demanding young daughter, Ruthie. In a tantrum Ruthie tosses away the car keys, causing a long delay as the adults search the nearby brush, until Joanna orders Ruthie to disclose where she threw the keys. A pedantic Howard suggests that Joanna resents Ruthie, who represents the child she wishes she had. After Ruthie says that Cathy called Joanna a "suburban English nobody," Mark insists they leave the Maxwell-Manchesters and continue travelling by themselves. Mark asks Joanna sardonically whether she really wants a Ruthie of their own.

In 1959 the Wallaces travel as a married couple on a limited budget, driving a rundown MG. When Joanna announces she is pregnant, Mark attempts enthusiasm. After the car catches fire, the Wallaces pull into a luxury hotel they can ill afford, the Domaine Saint-Just. To save money, they sneak in sparse food, only to find at checkout the seasonal price includes charges for breakfast and dinner. While they push the burnt-out car for disposal, a Bentley S1, belonging to wealthy couple Maurice and Françoise Dalbret, causes them to crash the MG into a barn. Maurice pays off the barn's owner, and the Wallaces travel with the Dalbrets. At the end of the trip Maurice hires Mark's architectural services.

The birth of Caroline results in Joanna's staying home and Mark's traveling alone to France. He has a one-night stand with a driver named Simone while he writes to Joanna lying about his activities and claiming to "miss" her.

In 1963, Joanna and young Caroline accompany Mark to a project for Maurice. Parenthood causes travel complications and strain in the marriage, with Mark admonishing Joanna that he never wanted a child. The two consider separating, and Joanna bitterly reflects that he never really wanted anything else. At the Dalbret property, Joanna meets Françoise's brother, David, who seduces her. When Mark confronts them, Joanna confesses she is in love with David. David gives her the choice to leave Mark for him; however, she returns to Mark, missing his sense of humor.

In the present, the Wallaces discuss divorce. Mark remains engrossed in work, paying little attention to Joanna. At a party at the Dalbret's new house, designed by Mark, David again approaches Joanna; Mark is jealous until David announces his engagement. When Maurice again demands a consultation with Mark, Mark and Joanna sneak out of the party. While driving away, they admit to one another that despite their frequent unhappiness and past unfaithfulness, they love one another and could never be apart.

At the France–Italy border, Mark believes he has lost his passport, but Joanna once again playfully provides it for him.

== Cast ==
- Audrey Hepburn as Joanna Wallace
- Albert Finney as Mark Wallace
- Kathy Chelimsky as Caroline Wallace
- Eleanor Bron as Cathy Maxwell-Manchester (née Seligman)
- William Daniels as Howard Maxwell-Manchester
- Gabrielle Middleton as Ruth Maxwell-Manchester
- Claude Dauphin as Maurice Dalbret
- Nadia Gray as Françoise Dalbret
- Georges Descrières as David
- Dominique Joos as Sylvia Urbino
- Jacqueline Bisset as Jackie
- Judy Cornwell as Pat Wainwright
- Irène Hilda as Yvonne, Comtesse de Florac
- Roger Dann as Gilbert, Comte de Florac
- Mario Verdon as Nikos Palamos
- Carol van Dyke as Michelle, Palamos's mistress
- Libby Morris as the American at the party
- Karyn Balm as Simone

== Production ==
=== Writing and casting ===
Raphael conceived the idea for Two for the Road in 1963 while driving with his wife from London to Rome. This was a trip the couple had taken many times through their relationship, having first done it hitchhiking and now driving in an expensive car. He described himself thinking during the drive, "imagine if we overtook ourselves on the road ten years ago. Ten years seemed a long time in those days. Then I said, 'wait a minute. That's a movie.' " Raphael floated the idea to producer Joseph Janni, with whom he was working at the time on the picture Darling, directed by John Schlesinger. Janni thought it was a good idea, but did not pursue it.

After Darling, Raphael was asked by Norman Panama to write the script for Not with My Wife, You Don't! Raphael told his agent it was a "vulgar, banal story" and that he could not do it, but his agent persuaded him to take the project, which would pay £9,000. Not long after he began writing, Raphael decided he had to quit the film, even though reneging on the contract might cost him his reputation in the film industry. Raphael met in London with Panama, who agreed to let him go. During the meeting, Panama mentioned that at a recent dinner party Stanley Donen had expressed his praise for the writing in Nothing but the Best. At the party, Donen had said to Panama about Raphael, "you lucky SOB. Why haven't I got him?" Panama offered to ask Donen to phone Raphael.

After talking on the telephone, Donen and Raphael met in London in 1964. Raphael has given differing accounts of when he suggested the Two for the Road idea to Donen. In one instance he claimed to have mentioned it at their first meeting, and in another he said that he and Donen went back and forth for a time before he brought it up. In either case, Donen was intrigued by the concept and gave Raphael $40,000 to write the script. After the project was underway, Donen telephoned Audrey Hepburn to see if she was interested in it. Having just finished the unsuccessful Paris When It Sizzles, which used some of the same non-linear storytelling Raphael intended for Two for the Road, she did not want to participate. Nonetheless, Raphael and Donen decided to proceed with the script.

The story was not autobiographical, but was inspired by Raphael's own marriage. He said that the events in the story were "based mainly on the experiences of my wife and me, but with a certain degree of expansiveness. These are not necessarily things that happened, but what might have happened." Raphael wrote the first draft of the script in the fall of 1964 while staying with his family in an apartment on the Via Francesco Ferrara in Rome. To compose the work, he wrote individual scenes on cards then rearranged them on the floor, creating a mosaic effect. Raphael sent the typed script to Donen in England on Wednesday, 11 November. After reading the script, Donen telephoned on Friday, 13 November to say he thought it was the best script he had ever read. Despite her previous rejection, Donen then sent the script to Hepburn, who agreed to meet in Switzerland to discuss it. In January 1965, Donen and Raphael flew to Switzerland to meet Hepburn at her home in Bürgenstock and try a second time to convince her to work on the film. When they met, Hepburn told the men, "I don't want to say too much about how much I like the script of Two for the Road, in case it embarrasses Frederico." However, Hepburn was concerned over the effect it would have on her pudique image to play a part that included nudity, premarital sex, and adultery. Donen and Raphael allayed her fears and convinced her to accept the role. Hepburn signed for $750,000, her standard rate at the time.

Donen took the picture initially to Universal, who had distributed his previous two films. His first choice for the leading man was Paul Newman, whom he sent the script. Newman declined the part on the grounds that it was a "director's picture" unsuited to a major star. After Newman's rejection, Universal dropped the project. Given he had signed a contract with Hepburn already, Donen could not abandon the project and was forced to find another studio. He managed to secure backing from Richard D. Zanuck at Twentieth Century-Fox. Zanuck gave the film $5 million to work with, and explained to Donen that the studio's 1966 Oscar budget would be dedicated to Doctor Dolittle. Donen's second choice for the lead male part was Albert Finney, who signed in early September 1965 for $300,000. At the time, Finney's only major credit was Tom Jones, and he was largely unknown in the United States. Donen said later he was quite nervous about giving the part to Finney. In December 1965 Hepburn became pregnant, which would set the filming back at least a year. However, in January 1966 she miscarried, which allowed the movie to go ahead.

Finney and Hepburn had never met, so Donen arranged a luncheon in Paris for them. At the meeting, Finney brought with him a male friend, and for the first part of the meal pretended to be an effeminate homosexual. Donen said that "the entire lunch, Audrey's jaw kept dropping." Unable to contain himself anymore, Finney burst out laughing and quit the performance. The gag served to break the ice between the two leads.

After seeing the film A Thousand Clowns, Donen decided on the spot to offer the parts of the American couple to William Daniels and Barbara Harris. At the time, Daniels and Harris were both in the stage musical On a Clear Day You Can See Forever. Daniels accepted the part, but Harris turned it down to continue appearing in the musical. The part of the wife went instead to English actress Eleanor Bron. Before Daniels flew to France for filming, Donen instructed him to purchase two madras jackets for his character to wear. The ostentatious jackets, a staple of Ivy League fashion, would accentuate the "ugly American" traits of Daniels's character. The part of Mark and Joanna's daughter Caroline went to child actress Kathy Chelimsky. Four years earlier, Kathy's older brother, Thomas Chelimsky, had played the part of Jean-Louis Gaudel in Donen and Hepburn's previous collaboration, Charade.

=== Filming ===
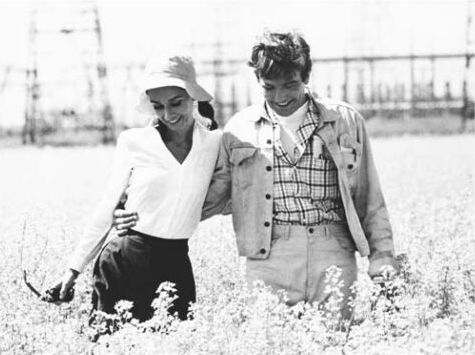
Hepburn and Finney by the Poste électrique du Plessis-Gassot during filming

The filming of Two for the Road began on 3 May 1966, the day before Hepburn's 37th birthday and 6 days before Finney's 30th jubilee birthday. Hepburn was seven years older than her Finney, which was highly unusual for her, as previously in her career she had always been considerably younger than her male co-stars. At the time, Hepburn's marriage to Mel Ferrer was breaking down. During the production she went to France alone while Ferrer elected to remain in Tolochenaz with their son, Sean Ferrer, and negotiate the production of Wait until Dark. Donen noted of Hepburn that "she was very strung up as we began filming. It was Albert who helped put her at ease." Finney, who came from a Northern working-class background, was in many ways the antithesis of the aristocratic Hepburn and was able to draw out a previously unseen side of her personality. As filming went on, the two became increasingly close and spent much of their time together outside of work, going out to eat and dance in the evenings. Finney later reflected on their relationship, explaining, "doing a scene with her, my mind knew I was acting but my heart didn't, and my body certainly didn't! Playing a love scene with someone as sexy as Audrey, you sometimes get to that edge where make-believe and reality are blurred. [...] The time spent with Audrey is one of the closest I've ever had." Finney regularly teased Hepburn, calling her "tawdry Audrey" and "Audrey Sunburn." Author Irwin Shaw, who visited the set, said of Hepburn, "she and Albie had this wonderful thing together, like a pair of kids with a perfect shorthand of jokes and references that closed out everybody else. It was like a brother and sister in their teens. When Mel was there, Audrey and Albie got rather formal and a little awkward, as if now they had to behave like grown ups."

The nature of Finney and Hepburn's relationship or how it ended was never disclosed. An unnamed source related, "if [Albert] and Audrey did make love, then they were discreet about it. But no one doubted the warmth between them." Charles Higham wrote that "William Daniels [...] says that he wouldn't deny (though he didn't actually know) that Audrey and Albert were lovers." According to biographer Donald Spoto, when filming finished in early September 1966, Ferrer threatened his wife with divorce if she did not end the relationship. As the divorce would have been filed on the grounds of her infidelity, Hepburn would risk losing custody of her son. Spoto said that, at this time, "everyone around her noted a fearful expression and nervous anxiety that even Finney was unable to alleviate." Sean Ferrer explained later, "I remember there was a tension in my parents' marriage at that time. Only years later did I realize it was because she was having an affair with Finney during the making of that movie." Hepburn remained silent about the relationship, though Finney hinted at it to friends. Robert Sallin claimed that Finney told him about the affair and said Hepburn was "rather like a blooming flower and then when her husband arrived, the flower closed up and shriveled." Hepburn's partner later in life, Robert Wolders, said that "Audrey cared for Finney a great deal. It was the beginning of a new period of her life."

Hepburn and Finney's closeness during the making of the film translated in their performances. Donen said later, "the Audrey I saw during the making of this film I didn't even know. She overwhelmed me. She was so free, so happy. I never saw her like that. So young! I guess it was Albie." Hepburn, who was in her late 30s and insecure over her "dreadful thinness," was uncomfortable doing some of the beach scenes in which she was to wear a bathing suit. Finney, however, convinced her, saying "you're really an eyeful, Audrey." Donen also struggled to convince Hepburn to do the scene at the Dalbret villa where she is thrown in the pool. As a nine-year-old, Hepburn had tangled her feet in weeds in a pond and nearly drowned, and remained terrified of water her whole life. After three days of coaxing her and denying her request for a body double, Donen got her to do the scene, albeit with two assistants waiting to pull her out after the shot.

The Dalbret scenes were filmed at a villa in L'Oumède, Ramatuelle. In the summer of 1968, the same villa was used as the principal location in the film La Piscine starring Alain Delon and Romy Schneider. The scene in which Schneider stands over Delon on the pool deck may have been borrowed from the scene in Two for the Road where Finney stands over Hepburn.

In the dialogue Joanna says that Mark was born in 1933, however, beyond that Raphael did not provide any background information about his characters. Donen invented several biographical details that are revealed on the passport the Wallaces use on their 1959 trip. The passport shows that Mark was born on 22 August 1933 in Chester, while Joanna was born on 11 July 1936 in Brentford. This makes Joanna only 18 years old in the scenes that take place in 1954, and Mark 21 years old. Hepburn often played characters much younger than her actual age, and despite her being 37 during filming, wardrobe, hairstyling, and acting techniques were used to make Hepburn fairly believable in the role. The same techniques are notably not used on Finney's character, so Hepburn's styling and acting does most of the work in helping the audience determine what time period each scene takes place in. Joanna's occupation is listed as "housewife," which contradicts the script, when she later says "by the time I get home from work, it's pitch black." At the time, their residence is listed as Surrey. The detail of Mark's forgetfulness was inspired directly by Raphael's own.

Much of the dialogue had to be re-recorded due to the sound of outdoor generators on set. However, by the time of post-production, Jacqueline Bisset had left for the United States to make The Detective. Donen hired another actress to read Bisset's parts and tried to get as close a match as he could. Consequently, Bisset's voice in the film is not her own.

=== Locations ===
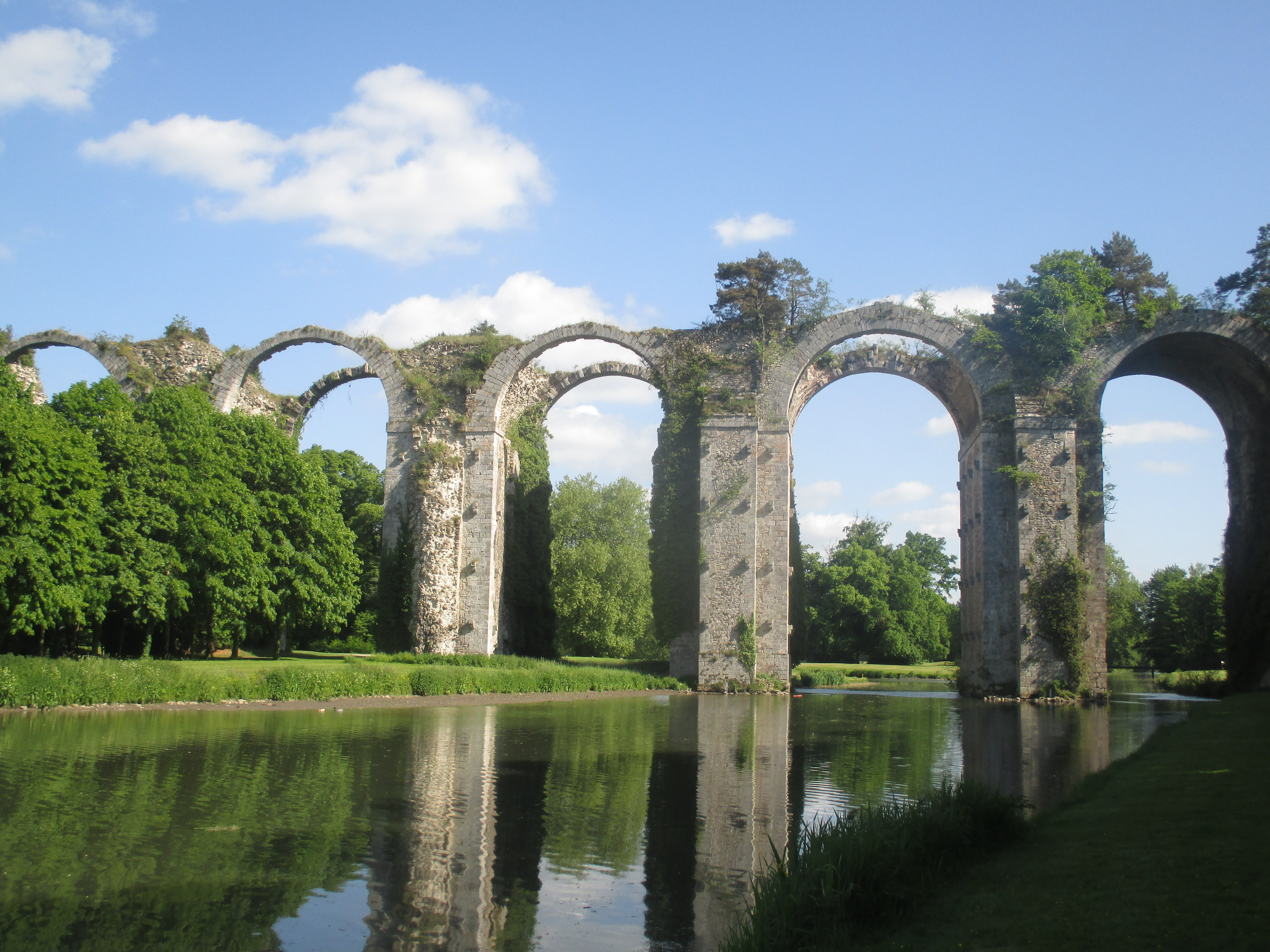
The Aqueduc de Maintenon, where Mark and Joanna set out on their own in 1954

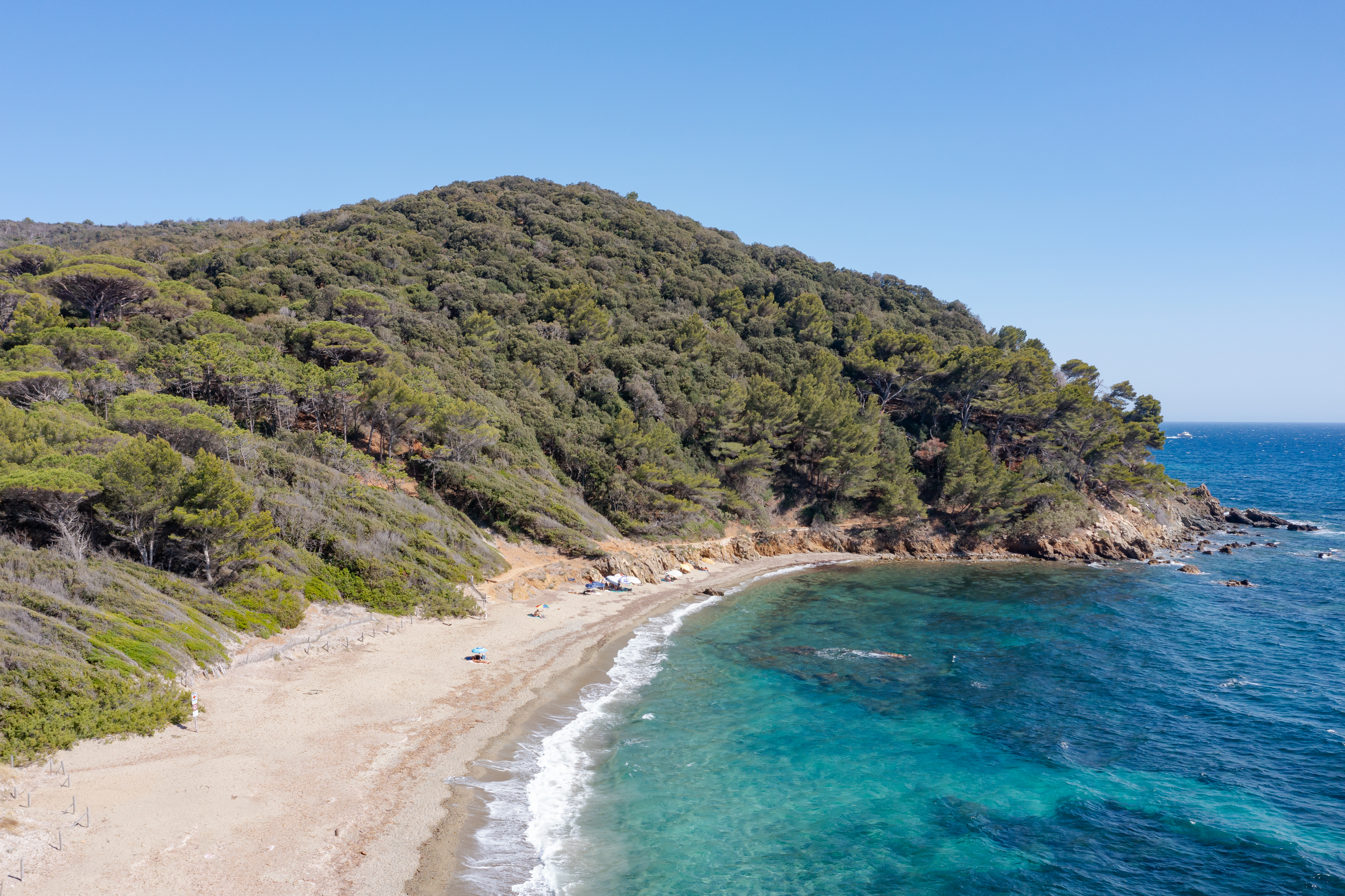
Mark and Joanna visit the Plage des Brouis on their 1954, 1959, and 1963 trips

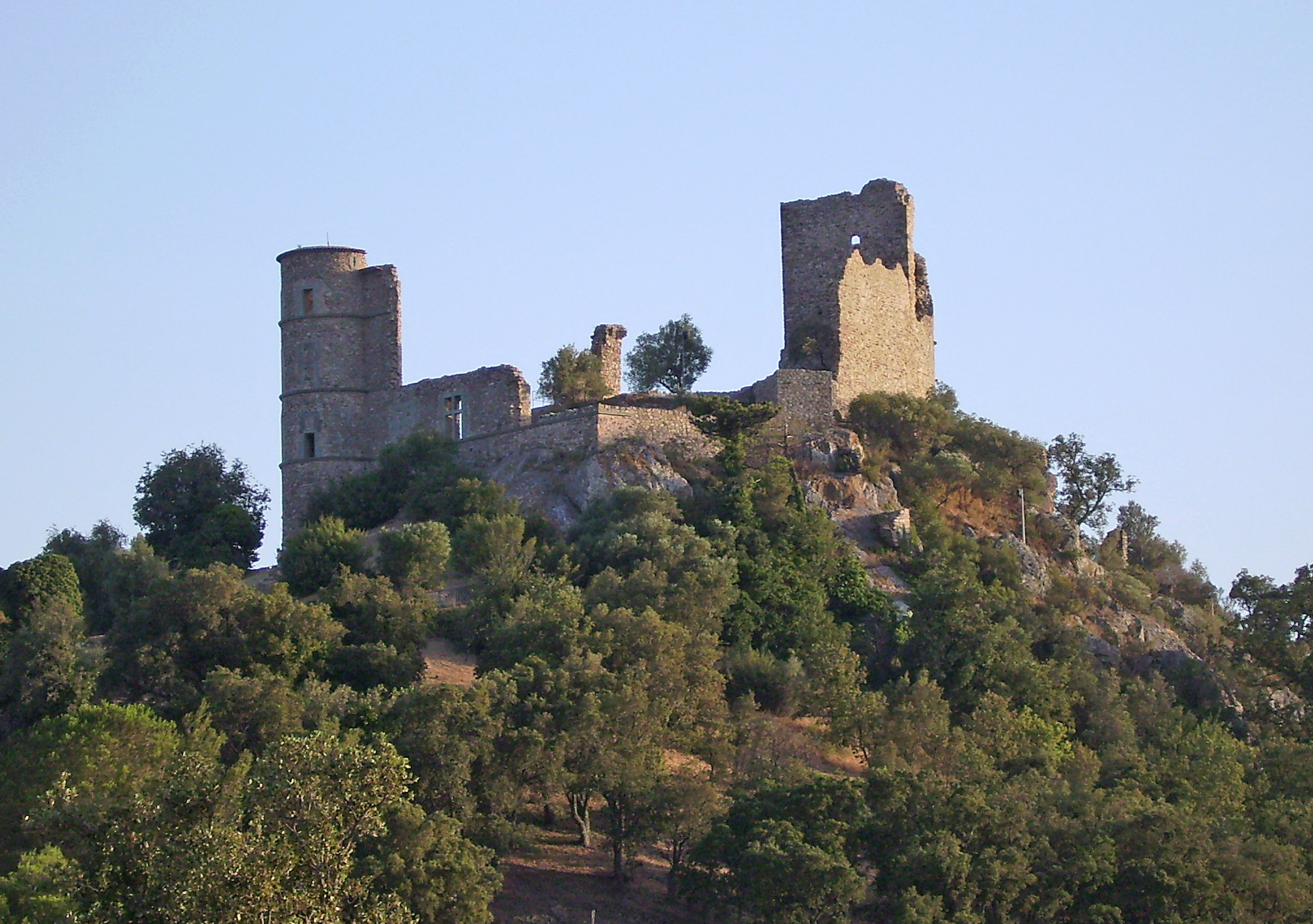
Mark finds Joanna and David at the Château de Grimaud during their affair

==== Hitchhiking trip (1954) ====
- Route D10 by Poste électrique du Plessis-Gassot, Val-d'Oise (bus crash)
- Aqueduc de Maintenon
- Cathédrale Notre-Dame de Senlis
- Tour-pigeonnier, Bussy-Saint-Georges
- Étangs de Commelles (hitchhiking)
- Hôtel de la Poste, unidentified town (first night together)
- Route D27, Rayol-Canadel-sur-Mer (arrival at the Mediterranean)
- Plage du Pin Parasol, Saint-Tropez (beach sunset)
- Plage des Brouis, La Croix-Valmer (swimming at the beach)

==== Ford trip (1957) ====
- Route de Férolles, Chevry-Cossigny (roadside stop)
- Château de Chantilly
- Pl. la Fontaine, Villeneuve-le-Comte (split from the Maxwell-Manchesters)

==== MG trip (1959) ====
- Port Lympia, Nice (Port de Dieppe)
- Ferry launch at Guernes
- Château de Villette, Condécourt (Domaine Saint-Just)
- Villa in L'Oumède, Ramatuelle (Dalbret villa)

==== Mark's trip alone ====
- Église Notre-Dame-de-l'Assomption de Gassin
- Bridge over the Vésubie at Béringuier, Utelle
- Hôtel du Comtat, 2 Place de la Liberté, Le Luc

==== Triumph trip (1963) ====
- Château de Grimaud (confrontation with David)
- Restaurant Leï Mouscardins, Rue Portalet, Saint-Tropez (lunch with David)

==== Mercedes trip (1966) ====
- Église Notre-Dame-de-l'Assomption d'Auvers-sur-Oise (wedding in Romney Marsh)
- Lydd Airport, Kent
- Étangs de Commelles (fight in the Mercedes)
- Château de Chaumontel, Val-d'Oise
- Obélisque de Villeneuve-le-Comte (roundabout)
- Le Beauvallon beach club, Grimaud
- Route Forestière de Gigaro, La Croix-Valmer (driving after the party)
- Plage de Gigaro, La Croix-Valmer (France–Italy border)

Studio scenes filmed at Victorine Studios, Nice, and Studios de Saint-Maurice, Saint-Maurice

== Soundtrack ==
During the filming of Two for the Road, Donen and Hepburn agreed that Henry Mancini should write the score for the film. Mancini had scored the previous collaboration between Donen and Hepburn, 1963's Charade. Hepburn cabled Mancini and wrote, "Dearest Hank, please won't you do the music? Couldn't imagine anyone else but you scoring." Mancini noted that this was the only time in his career an actor, rather than a director, had asked him to write for a film. After he read the script, Mancini said to Donen, "I can't make head or tail of this," to which Donen responded, "when you see it on the screen it will be much more obvious–the change of clothes, the change of cars." At the time, Mancini was depressed over his father's death. The theme song he wrote for Donen was described as a "rather sad, rather hurt-sounding melody, trying to be redolent of the film characters' regrets but rather indulging his own." Donen rejected the song after hearing it and communicated that he wanted a road song, not a love song.

Having seldom faced rejection for his work, Mancini wrote a new song that had "more notes" and an "underlying pull and tension to it." The new theme Mancini wrote satisfied all Donen's requirements and became Mancini's personal favourite of the songs he had written. To evoke the French setting of the film, Mancini arranged solo accordion and violin parts in the title theme. The violin solo was played by the iconic French jazz violinist Stéphane Grappelli, who Mancini calls "Mr Grappelli" in the score. The final score included 37 cues, compared to the 32 of Charade. Mancini recorded the soundtrack in London.

After the film was completed, Leslie Bricusse wrote lyrics to the theme song. Mancini then re-recorded parts of the score at RCA Studios in Hollywood, sans Grappelli, to use on the "music from" soundtrack album that was released on RCA Records. Mancini regretted making the second recordings, saying, "I probably shouldn't have done it, but I was trapped in a monster of my own making." The vocal version of the theme appears on the soundtrack but does not in the film. In subsequent years, artists including Andy Williams, Peggy Lee, Pat Metheny, Dave Grusin, and Seth MacFarlane have recorded the theme.

== Release ==
Two for the Road opened at the Radio City Music Hall in New York City on 27 April 1967 and ran until 24 May. Fox chose the theatre because of its past association with Donen films; Cover Girl, On the Town, Singin' in the Rain, and Charade had all premiered at Radio City. Donen fought the studio over the booking, as he believed Two for the Road was too intimate a picture for such a grand venue.

The film received its British premiere on 31 August 1967 at the Odeon Leicester Square. The same day, Hepburn and Ferrer announced the press that they were separating. The media speculated that this was a publicity stunt to coincide with the film's release, though they learned later that the separation was genuine.

== Reception ==
=== Initial reviews ===
In the New York World Journal Tribune, Judith Crist wrote, "Two for the Road is that rare thing, an adult comedy by and for grown-ups, bright, brittle and sophisticated, underlined by cogency and honest emotion. And, far from coincidentally, it is a complex and beautifully made movie, eye-filling and engrossing with a 'new' (mod and non-Givenchy) Audrey Hepburn displaying her too-long-neglected depths and scope as an actress." Time wrote, "abandoning the Givenchy school and the elfin cool, Audrey Hepburn is surprisingly good as a Virginia Woolf-cub who has earned her share of scars in the jungle war between the sexes. As her mate, Albert Finney is not so fortunate, and seems curiously unsympathetic in helping to turn his marriage into a fray-for-all." The Independent Film Journal said, "Miss Hepburn moves swiftly but gently through all the manifestations of virginity to marriage and womanhood, hardly missing any of the in-between stages. She is delicate and responsive in her performance, alternately seductive and aggressive, playing the theme of the joys and agonies of love to her womanly hilt." Meanwhile, Rex Reed wrote that "Two for the Road is perhaps the best American movie of 1967," and that audiences would be rewarded by "two of the most brilliant performances–by Audrey Hepburn and Albert Finney–ever captured on the screen."

The Monthly Film Bulletin was slightly more critical, saying, "despite its high-toned trimmings, a film like this must stand or fall by its stars, and the leading players are here well worth watching, even if they are never quite able to get beneath the skins of the characters they portray." Hollis Alpert in Saturday Review criticised the casting, saying "Miss Hepburn is handicapped during her more immature periods by the fact that she is now a distinctly aging ingenue," and "Finney seems too young to play a mature architect." Variety described the movie as "a breezy trip through married life with Audrey Hepburn's superb performance carrying stodgy Albert Finney most of the way." Roger Ebert in the Chicago Sun-Times gave the film four stars and wrote, "this is a slick, entirely professional, very smooth movie – but it is just because Donen and his associates are seasoned craftsmen that they never stoop to the obvious. They make Two for the Road two things: a Hollywood-style romance between beautiful people, and an honest story about recognizable human beings. I'd call it A Man and a Woman for grown-ups."

In Film Quarterly, Stephen Farber wrote that "one of the most appealing things about the film is that it blurs the line between art and entertainment that many people wish were easier to draw. No one is going to call Two for the Road a great work of cinema art–it's just too pretty, too charming, at times too sentimental. But if you dismiss the movie as 'mere entertainment,' you dismiss one of the few features made anywhere in the last couple of years that provides a different kind of film experience, and that makes demands on its audience." Farber also praised the film's treatment of time, saying it "is the first film I know that convincingly communicates the feeling of time passing, years actually lived in. [...] Two for the Road's kaleidoscope of liquid time and emotion blows our minds, gives us the sensation of life actually, painfully changing as we watch it."

The most critical review came the day after the premiere from Bosley Crowther in the New York Times. Crowther wrote, "there are some precious moments of romantic charm in this bitter account of domestic discord amid surroundings that should inspire nothing but delight. And so one must seize upon them for the entertainment that is to be had, and endure the tedium of much of the picture." It is possible Crowther's review was prejudiced, as he and Donen had clashed at a pre-screening press conference several days earlier. After Crowther called the film "commercial American trash," Donen dressed him down publicly by saying "as far as I'm concerned, you are nothing but an impossible son of a bitch."

=== Retrospective reviews ===
In an interview in 1973, Donen criticised some of the choices he made in the film. He related, "in a strange way I don't think Two for the Road succeeds in itself because I chickened out. It should be a much more serious film than it is, because it really is a film that examines the basis of the marital relationship–unlike Indiscreet, which is a bubble of a romantic movie. Two for the Road attempts to truly examine marriage, but I made it too entertaining and didn't really probe as deeply as one could have within the context of what we were working with. I blame myself and only myself, really. But yes, I think it's a good movie; I'm not trying to rap Two for the Road, but if I could have done it again I could have done better with it."

Stephen M. Silverman wrote of the film, "however one approaches Two for the Road, it stands the test of time as Stanley Donen's best work. It is the picture that film students most request to speak to him about. It is his most personal film and his most passionate. It moves to his rhythm. It reflects his originality. And it is a film that has a lyricism all its own." In retrospect, Donen criticised Finney for the lack of affection Mark Wallace displays for his wife. Donen said, "it came out a little one-sided, like he's a shit, and he wasn't supposed to be." On the other hand, Donen thought Hepburn's performance was the best of her career. He explained, "the role required a depth of emotion, care, yearning, and maturity that Audrey had never played before. She gave what I think is her best performance." Raphael commented later, "I am somewhat biased, but I don't think I have ever seen a performance more manifestly worthy of an Oscar, if that matters, than Audrey's in Two for the Road."

One of Hepburn's biographers, Charles Higham, wrote that "the picture was to achieve an extraordinary level of emotional intensity, all the more remarkable because it was hidden in humour. Audrey's portrayal of a range of emotions as the seemingly lighthearted Joanna Wallace betokened a striking advance for her as an actress, and this was perhaps her finest performance on the screen. In one sequence in the south of France, as she ran tearfully through a garden to a swimming pool followed by Albert Finney's Mark Wallace, she was astonishingly open in her expression of personal pain."

Drew Casper said, "Raphael's dialogue is gorgeously crafted: sharply in character, witty, fecund with Pinteresque pauses and silences that mean as much as the words and are, above all, so touching." He summarised the film saying, "today, Two for the Road is regarded as one of the best romantic comedy-dramas to come out of Hollywood and enjoys a cult status, viewed again and again by film aestheticians, students, and enthusiasts."

=== Box office ===
According to Fox records, the film needed to earn $8,950,000 to break even, and made $7,200,000.

== Artefacts ==
The disc dress designed by Paco Rabanne that Hepburn wears in the house party scene is owned by the Riverside Museum in Glasgow. The paste tiara she wore in the scene where Joanna and Mark return to the Dalbret house after the gala sold in 2017 at Christie's for GBP 43,750.

The right-hand drive 1965 Mercedes-Benz 230 SL used in the film was Donen's personal car. In the film the car wears the same registration, MML 303C, as the red 230 used in Arabesque. It is unclear if it was the same car and was repainted white, or if it was a different car he purchased after Arabesque was filmed. The car's current whereabouts are unknown.

== Awards and nominations ==
- 1968 Academy Award Nomination for Best Original Screenplay (Frederic Raphael)
- 1968 BAFTA Film Award Nomination for Best British Screenplay (Frederic Raphael)
- 1968 Cinema Writers Circle Award for Best Foreign Film (Mejor Película Extranjera) Won
- 1968 Directors Guild of America Award Nomination for Outstanding Directorial Achievement (Stanley Donen)
- 1968 Golden Globe Award Nomination for Best Motion Picture Actress (Audrey Hepburn)
- 1968 Golden Globe Award Nomination for Best Original Score (Henry Mancini)
- 1967 San Sebastián International Film Festival - Golden Shell for Best Film (Stanley Donen) Won
- 1967 Writers' Guild of Great Britain Merit Scroll for Best British Original Screenplay (Frederic Raphael) Won
- 2002 Ranked 57 on the American Film Institute's 100 Years... 100 Passions list
