= Black Dog & Leventhal Publishers =

American book publisher

- Parent company: Running Press (Hachette Book Group)
- Founded: 1992 or 1993
- Founder: J.P. Leventhal
- Country of origin: United States
- Headquarters location: New York City
- Publication types: Books
- Imprints: Tess Press
- Official website: Official website

Black Dog & Leventhal (and its imprint Tess Press) is a book publisher located in New York City. The company was founded by J.P. Leventhal in 1992 or 1993. It publishes general non-fiction but is best known for comprehensive illustrated information-based works. Black Dog & Leventhal's books were distributed by Workman Publishing Company until the company's acquisition by Hachette Book Group in 2014. After Leventhal's retirement in 2017, Black Dog & Leventhal became an imprint of Running Press.

== Notable authors ==
Black Dog & Leventhal has published many acclaimed authors, including David Baldacci, Sandra Brown, Michael Connelly, Malcolm Gladwell, Sally Mann, Gwyneth Paltrow, James Patterson, and Stephen M. Silverman.
