= Surprise Package (film) =

1960 film by Stanley Donen

- Theatrical release poster
- Directed by: Stanley Donen
- Screenplay by: Harry Kurnitz
- Based on: A Gift from the Boys; 1958 novel by Art Buchwald
- Produced by: Stanley Donen; Paul B. Radin
- Starring: Yul Brynner; Mitzi Gaynor; Noël Coward
- Cinematography: Christopher Challis
- Edited by: Jim Clark
- Music by: Benjamin Frankel
- Production company: Stanley Donen Productions
- Distributed by: Columbia Pictures Corporation
- Release date: September 29, 1960 (US)
- Running time: 100 minutes
- Country: United States
- Language: English
- Box office: $1,100,000 (US and Canada rentals)

Surprise Package is a 1960 American comedy film directed by Stanley Donen and starring Yul Brynner, Mitzi Gaynor, and Noël Coward. The supporting cast features George Coulouris, Michael Balfour, Eric Pohlmann and Barry Foster. The screenplay concerns an American gangster living on a Greek island who hatches a plan to steal the crown of a banished king.

== Plot ==
Nico March is being deported by the U.S. government. Not wanting his money confiscated he orders an accomplice to hide it while also keeping an eye on his longtime girlfriend, Gabby Rogers.

Exiled to a Greek island Nico quickly meets corrupt cop Mirales and the banished king of Anatolia, Pavel II, who wants to sell Nico his old crown. Nico is double-crossed by his accomplice, who instead of sending him the money sends Gabby.

Nico figures out where the king's crown is hidden inside the villa where he lives and plans to steal it, using Gabby to distract him. Other criminals, including Dr. Panzer and strongman Igor, want to get to it first. They knock Nico unconscious and find the crown but Tibor, Nico's Hungarian spy friend, steals it back. In the ensuing chase Tibor gets shot and dies in Gabby's arms. Gabby gives the crown to Stavrin who will place it in a monastery for all the people to see. Dr. Panzer and Igor end up placed under arrest for the murder of Tibor.

Nico proposes and Gabby accepts. Nico and the king both need money, so they turn the latter's villa into a casino, where Gabby works as the hat & coat check girl.

== Cast ==
- Yul Brynner as Nico March
- Mitzi Gaynor as Gabby Rogers
- Noël Coward as King Pavel II
- George Coulouris as Dr. Panzer
- Michael Balfour as Oscar
- Eric Pohlmann as Mirales
- Guy Deghy as Tibor
- Lyndon Brook as Stavrin
- Alf Dean as Igor Trofim (as Man Mountain Dean)
- Lionel Murton as US Marshal
- Barry Foster as US Marshal
- Michael Balfour as Oscar
- Cec Linder as Lawyer
- Bill Nagy as Johnny Stettina
- Frederick Leister as Aide to King Pavel II
- Paul Carpenter as TV News Broadcaster
- Danny Green as Nicky Canfield
- Carol White as Sexy Teenager

== See also ==
- List of American films of 1960
