= Love Letters (1999 film) =

- DVD cover
- Based on: Love Letters play by A. R. Gurney
- Written by: A. R. Gurney
- Directed by: Stanley Donen
- Starring: Steven Weber; Laura Linney; Kirsten Storms; Tim Redwine
- Music by: Lee Holdridge
- Country of origin: United States
- Original language: English

Production
- Executive producers: Leonard Goldberg; Martin Starger
- Cinematography: Michael Fash
- Editors: Robert Reitano; Philip Weisman
- Running time: 100 minutes
- Production company: Marstar/Mandy Films

Original release
- Network: ABC
- Release: April 12, 1999

Love Letters is a 1999 American made-for-television drama film directed by Stanley Donen and based on the 1988 play by A. R. Gurney. Gurney adapted his own original play, dramatizing scenes and portraying characters that were merely described in the play. Donen had envisioned it to be a feature film, but a limited budget restricted him to make a TV movie, and he shot the film in only 17 days. It was his last film before his death in 2019. Love Letters originally premiered on ABC on April 12, 1999.

== Plot ==
An ambitious U.S. Senator reflects back on his life after the death of a woman whom he loved and kept in contact with only through correspondence. The movie is told in flashbacks as the two first meet as children and begin their lifelong correspondence. He grows into his political aspirations and leaves her behind, as she becomes a struggling artist facing a rocky life: the two encounter different experiences on the paths they take.

== Cast ==
- Steven Weber as Andrew Ladd
- Laura Linney as Melissa Gardner Cobb
- Kirsten Storms as Teenaged Melissa
- Tim Redwine as Teenaged Andrew
- Isabella Fink as Melissa - Age 7
- Stephen Joffe as Andy - Age 7
- Chas Lawther as Harry
