= Stanley Donen =

American film director and choreographer (1924–2019)

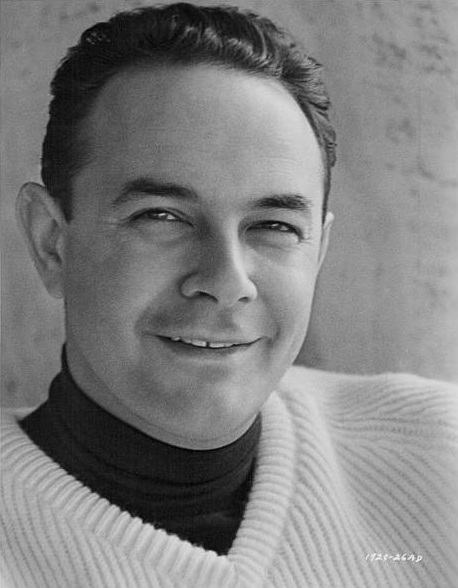
- Donen in 1963
- Born: April 13, 1924; Columbia, South Carolina, U.S.
- Died: February 21, 2019 (aged 94); New York City, U.S.
- Occupations: Film director; film producer; choreographer; dancer; stage director
- Years active: 1940–2003
- Known for: Singin' in the Rain; On the Town; Funny Face; Charade
- Spouses: Jeanne Coyne (m. 1948; div. 1951) Marion Marshall (m. 1952; div. 1959) Adelle O'Connor Beatty (m. 1960; div. 1971) Yvette Mimieux (m. 1972; div. 1985) Pamela Braden (m. 1990; div. 1994)
- Partner: Elaine May (c. 1999)
- Children: 3, including Joshua Donen

Stanley Donen (/ˈdɒnən/ DON-ən; April 13, 1924 – February 21, 2019) was an American film director and choreographer. He received the Honorary Academy Award in 1998, and the Career Golden Lion at the Venice Film Festival in 2004. Four of his films have been inducted into the National Film Registry at the Library of Congress.

Donen began his career as a dancer in the chorus line on Broadway for director George Abbott. From 1943, he worked in Hollywood as a choreographer before collaborating with Gene Kelly where Donen worked as a contract director for MGM under producer Arthur Freed. Donen and Kelly directed the films On the Town (1949), Singin' in the Rain (1952), and It's Always Fair Weather (1955). Donen's relationship with Kelly deteriorated during their final collaboration. His other films during this period include Royal Wedding (1951), Seven Brides for Seven Brothers (1954), and Funny Face (1957).

He then broke his contract with MGM to become an independent film producer in 1957. Donen received acclaim for his later films including the romance films Indiscreet (1958), Charade (1963), and Two for the Road (1967). He also directed the spy thriller Arabesque (1966), the British comedy Bedazzled (1967), the musicals Damn Yankees (1958) and The Little Prince (1974), the dramedy Lucky Lady (1975), and the sex comedy Blame It on Rio (1984).

== Early life and stage career ==
Stanley Donen was born on April 13, 1924, in Columbia, South Carolina to Mordecai Moses Donen, a dress-shop manager, and Helen (Cohen), the daughter of a jewelry salesman. His younger sister Carla Donen Davis was born in August 1937. Born to Jewish parents, Donen became an atheist in his youth. Donen described his childhood as lonely and unhappy as one of the few Jews in Columbia, and he was occasionally bullied by antisemitic classmates at school. To help cope with his isolation, Donen spent much of his youth in local movie theaters and was especially fond of Westerns, comedies and thrillers. The film that had the strongest impact on him was the 1933 Fred Astaire and Ginger Rogers musical Flying Down to Rio. Donen said that he "must have seen the picture thirty or forty times. I was transported into some sort of fantasy world where everything seemed to be happy, comfortable, easy and supported. A sense of well-being filled me." He shot and screened home movies with an 8 mm camera and projector that his father bought for him.

Inspired by Astaire, Donen took dance lessons in Columbia and performed at the local Town Theater. His family often traveled to New York City during summer vacations where he saw Broadway musicals and took dance lessons. One of his early instructors in New York was Ned Wayburn, who taught eleven-year-old Astaire in 1910. After graduating from high school at the age of sixteen, Donen attended the University of South Carolina for one summer semester, studying psychology. Encouraged by his mother, he moved to New York City to pursue dancing on stage in the fall of 1940. After two auditions, he was cast as a chorus dancer in the original Broadway production of Rodgers and Hart's Pal Joey, directed by George Abbott. The titular Pal Joey was played by the young up-and-comer Gene Kelly, who became a Broadway star in the role.

Abbott cast Donen in the chorus of his next Broadway show Best Foot Forward. He became the show's assistant stage manager, and Kelly asked him to be his assistant choreographer. Eventually Donen was fired from Best Foot Forward, but in 1942 was the stage manager and assistant choreographer for Abbott's next show Beat the Band. In 1946, Donen briefly returned to Broadway to help choreograph dance numbers for Call Me Mister.

== Film career ==
=== 1943–1949: Hollywood choreographer ===
In 1943 Arthur Freed, the producer of musical films at Metro Goldwyn Mayer, bought the film rights to Best Foot Forward and made a film version starring Lucille Ball and William Gaxton. Donen moved to Hollywood to audition for the film and signed a one-year contract with MGM. Donen appeared as a chorus dancer and was made assistant choreographer by Charles Walters. At MGM Donen renewed his friendship with Kelly, who was now a supporting actor in musicals. When Kelly was loaned to Columbia Pictures for a film, he was offered the chance to choreograph his own dance numbers and asked Donen to assist. Kelly stated: "Stanley needed a job. I needed someone to count for the cameraman, someone who knew the steps and could explain what I was going to do so the shot was set up correctly." Donen accepted and choreographed three dance sequences with Kelly in Cover Girl (1944). Donen came up with the idea for the "Alter Ego" dance sequence where Kelly's reflection jumps out of a shop window and dances with him. Director Charles Vidor insisted that the idea would never work, so Donen and Kelly directed the scene themselves and Donen spent over a year editing it. The film made Kelly a movie star and is considered by many film critics to be an important and innovative musical. Donen signed a one-year contract with Columbia and choreographed several films there, but returned to MGM the following year when Kelly wanted assistance on his next film.

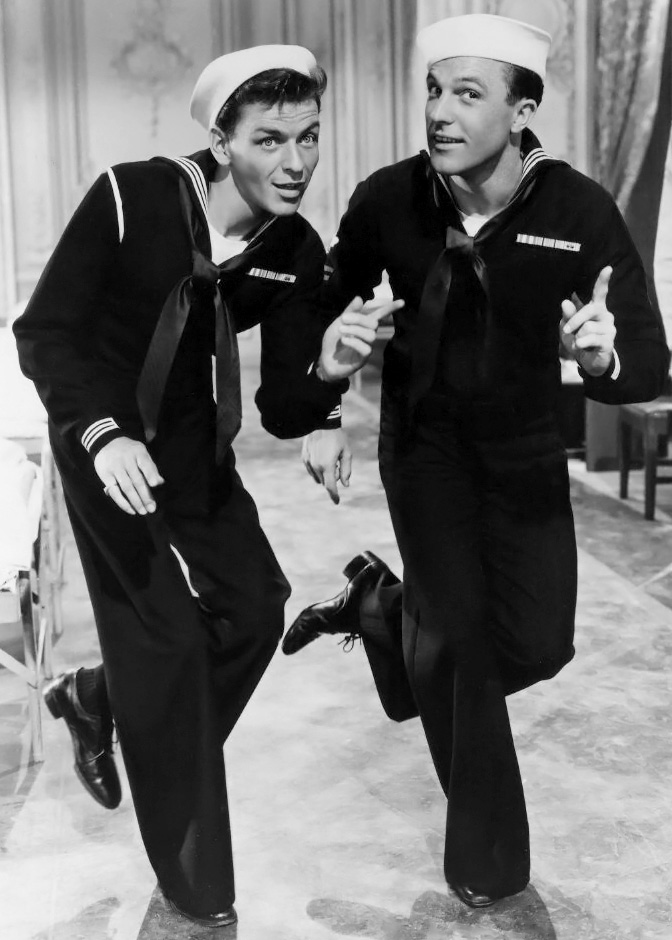
Sinatra and Kelly in Anchors Aweigh

In 1944, Donen and Kelly choreographed the musical Anchors Aweigh, released in 1945 and starring Kelly and Frank Sinatra. The film is best known for its groundbreaking scene in which Kelly dances with Jerry the Mouse from the Tom and Jerry cartoons. The animation was supervised by William Hanna and Joseph Barbera and is credited to the MGM animation producer Fred Quimby, but the idea for the scene was Donen's. Donen and Kelly originally wanted to use either Mickey Mouse or Donald Duck for the sequence and met with Walt Disney to discuss the project; Disney was working on a similar idea in The Three Caballeros (1944) and was unwilling to license one of his characters to MGM. The duo spent two months shooting Kelly dancing and Donen spent a year perfecting the scene frame by frame. According to Barbera "the net result at the preview of Anchors Away that I went to, blew the audience away".

While Kelly completed his service in the U.S. Naval Air Service as a photographer from 1944 to 1946, Donen did uncredited work as a choreographer on musical films. Of this period Donen said, "I practiced my craft, working with music, track and photography. I often directed the sequences. I always tried to have an original idea about how to do musical sequences." Donen stated that he was excused from military service as 4-F due to his high blood pressure. When Kelly returned to civilian life, he and Donen directed and choreographed Kelly's dance scenes in Living in a Big Way (1947). They then began work on an original story about two baseball players in the early 20th century who spend their off-season as vaudevillian song and dance men. This film would eventually become Take Me Out to the Ball Game (1949). Kelly and Donen hoped to co-direct the film, but Freed hired Busby Berkeley instead, and they only directed Kelly's dance numbers. The film starred Kelly, Frank Sinatra and Jules Munshin.

=== 1949: On the Town ===
After the success of Take Me Out to the Ball Game, Freed gave Donen and Kelly the chance to direct On the Town, which was released in 1949. The film was an adaptation of the Betty Comden and Adolph Green Broadway musical about sailors on leave in New York City and was the first musical to feature location-filming. Donen and Kelly wanted to shoot the entire film in New York, but Freed would only allow them to spend one week away from the studio.

That week produced the film's opening number "New York, New York". Away from both studio interference and sound stage constrictions, Donen and cinematographer Harold Rosson shot a scene on the streets of New York City that pioneered many cinematic techniques that would be adopted by the French New Wave a decade later. These techniques included spatial jump cuts, 360-degree pans, hidden cameras, abrupt changes of screen direction and non-professional actors. Donen's biographer Joseph A. Casper stated that the scene avoids being gratuitous or amateurish, while still "developing plot, describing the setting while conveying its galvanizing atmosphere and manic mood, introducing and delineating character." Casper also said: "Today the film is regarded as a turning point: the first bona fide musical that moved dance, as well as the musical genre, out of the theater and captured it with and for film rather than on film; the first to make the city an important character; and the first to abandon the chorus."

On the Town starred Kelly, Frank Sinatra and Jules Munshin as three sailors on a 24-hour shore leave in New York whose romantic pursuits lead them to Ann Miller, Betty Garrett and Vera-Ellen. The film was a success both financially and critically and won the Academy Award for Best Music, Scoring of a Musical Picture while screenwriters Comden and Green won the Writers Guild of America Award for Best Written American Musical. Like Orson Welles, Donen made his directorial debut at 25. Donen stated that Kelly was "responsible for most of the dance movements. I was behind the camera in the dramatic and musical sequences." Kelly believed that he and Donen "were a good team. I thought we complemented each other very well" he said.

=== 1949–1952: MGM contract director ===
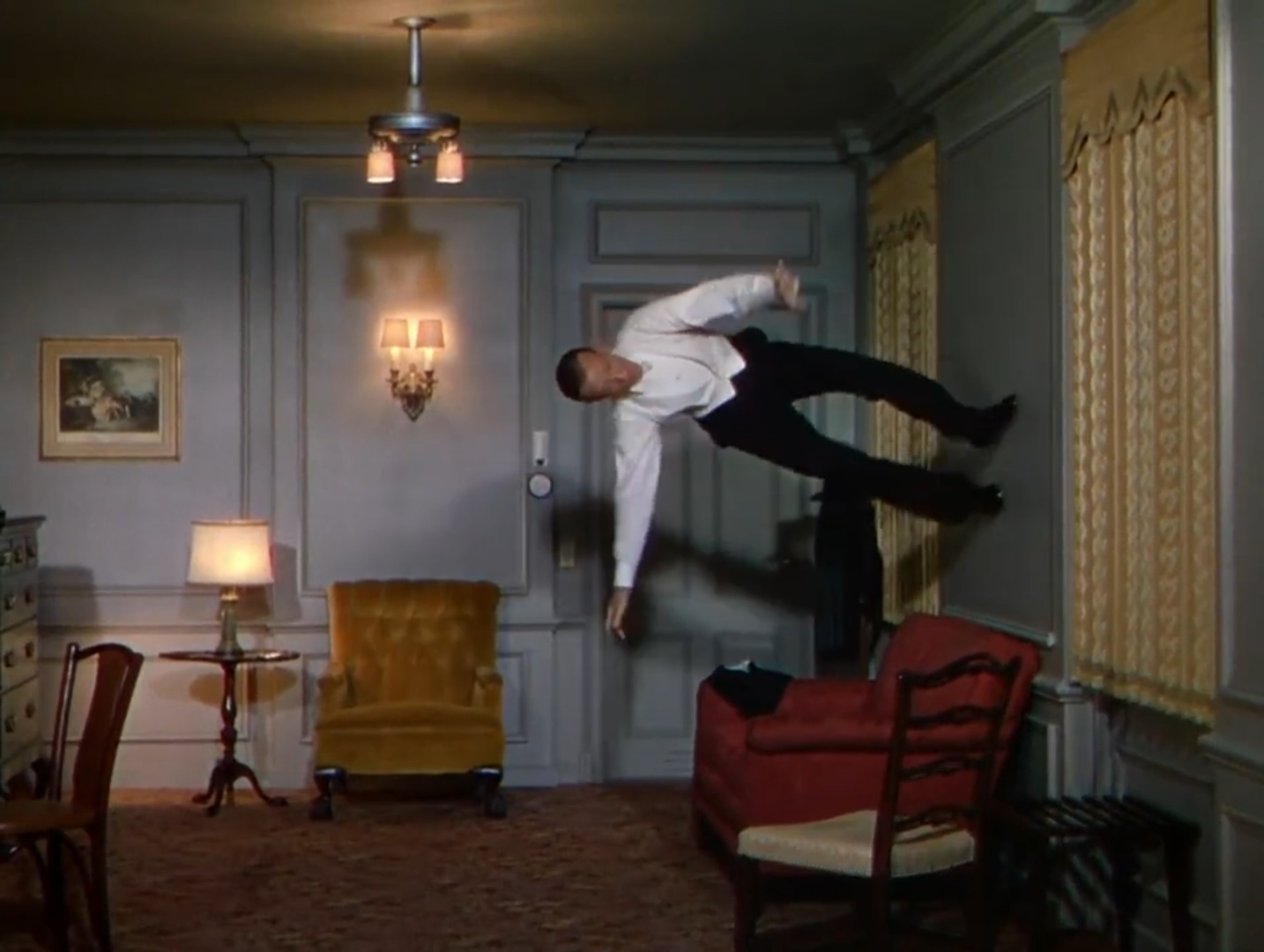
Fred Astaire dances on the walls and ceiling in Royal Wedding, a special effect using a rotating reinforced-steel cylindrical chamber in which to film.

After the success of On the Town, Donen signed a seven-year contract with MGM as a director. His next two films were for Freed, but were made without Kelly's participation. After being replaced as director on Pagan Love Song over personal differences with star Esther Williams, Donen was given the chance to direct his boyhood idol Fred Astaire.

Royal Wedding (1951) starred Astaire and Jane Powell as a brother-sister American dancing team performing in England during the royal wedding of Elizabeth and Philip in 1947. Judy Garland was originally cast in the lead role, but was fired for absenteeism due to illness and was ultimately replaced by Powell. In the film, Powell's love affair with a wealthy Englishman (Peter Lawford) threatens to ruin the brother-sister act, while Astaire finds his own romance with another dancer (Sarah Churchill). The film is loosely based on Astaire's real-life career with his sister and early dancing partner, Adele Astaire, who retired after marrying an English lord in 1932 and includes one of Astaire's best remembered dance sequences, the "You're All the World to Me" number where he appears to defy gravity by dancing first on the walls and then on the ceiling. The shot was achieved by building the set inside a steel-reinforced rotating cylindrical chamber, with the camera attached to the cylinder. Both Astaire and the film's lyricist Alan Jay Lerner claimed that they thought of the idea. The film included music by Lerner and Burton Lane and was released in March 1951.

Next, Donen made Love Is Better Than Ever, which was not released until March 1952. The film stars Larry Parks as a streetwise show business agent who is compelled to marry an innocent young dance teacher (Elizabeth Taylor). Donen and Kelly appear in cameo roles. The reason for the film's delayed release (by over a year) was Parks's appearance before the House Un-American Activities Committee and his eventual admission of his former membership in the Communist Party, and for naming other participants. The film was unsuccessful at the box-office.

=== 1952: Singin' in the Rain ===
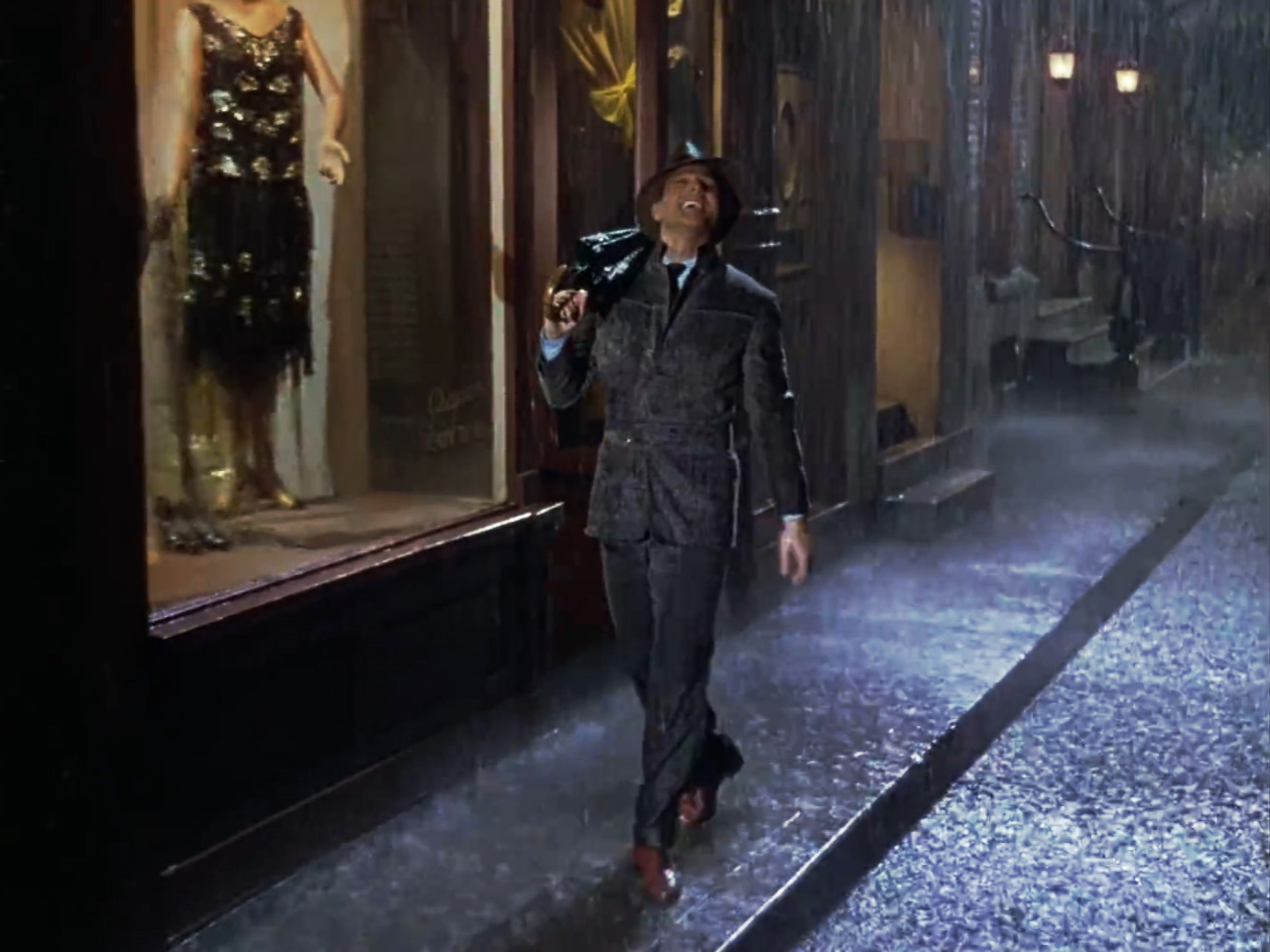
Gene Kelly in Singin' in the Rain

Donen teamed again with Kelly — who was at the height of his fame after the release of An American in Paris (1951) — to make Singin' in the Rain (1952), which would become one of the most highly praised films of all time. The film was produced by Freed, written by Comden and Green, photographed by Harold Rosson and starred Kelly, Debbie Reynolds, Donald O'Connor, Jean Hagen, Millard Mitchell and Cyd Charisse.

Donen, along with Kelly, were brought in by Freed (who also hired Comden and Green to write a script) to make a musical using old songs that he and composer Nacio Herb Brown wrote in the late 1920s and early 1930s. Comden and Green decided to write a story inspired by the time period in which the songs were written, and satirized Hollywood's transition from silent films to sound films in the late 1920s. Comden, Green and Donen interviewed everyone at MGM who was in Hollywood during that period, poking fun at both the first movie musicals and the technical difficulties with early sound films. This included characters loosely based on Freed and Berkeley and a scene that references silent film star John Gilbert. Donen and Kelly also made use of MGM's large collection of sets, props, costumes and outdated equipment from the 1920s.

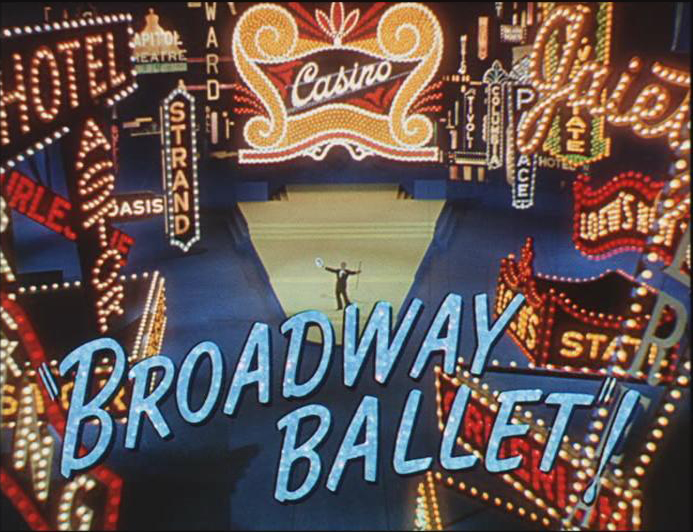
Still from Singin' in the Rain

In the film, Don Lockwood (Kelly) and Lina Lamont (Hagen) are two silent film stars in Hollywood whose careers are threatened by the invention of sound films. With help from his best friend Cosmo Brown (O'Connor) and love interest Kathy Selden (Reynolds), Lockwood saves his career by turning his latest film into a musical. Filming was harmonious, but Donen thought Kelly's "Broadway Melody" ballet sequence was too long. The "Singin' in the Rain" musical number took several months to choreograph, and Donen and Kelly found it necessary to dig holes in the cement to create puddles in the street.

The film was a hit when it was released in April 1952, earning over $7.6 million. Kelly's An American in Paris had been a surprise Best Picture winner at the Oscars in March, and MGM decided to re-release it. Singin' in the Rain got pulled from many theaters to showcase the earlier film, preventing it from making further profits. Singin' in the Rain was nominated for two Academy Awards: Best Supporting Actress for Hagen and Best Original Score. Donald O'Connor won the Golden Globe Award for Best Actor in a Musical or Comedy and Comden and Green once again won the Writers Guild of America Award for Best Written American Musical. Initially the film received only moderate reviews from critics such as Bosley Crowther and did not begin to receive widespread acclaim until the late 1960s. One of its early supporters was critic Pauline Kael, who said that it "is perhaps the most enjoyable of all movie musicals – just about the best Hollywood musical of all time." It was re-released in 1975 to critical and popular success.

=== 1952–1955: Further success and break with MGM ===
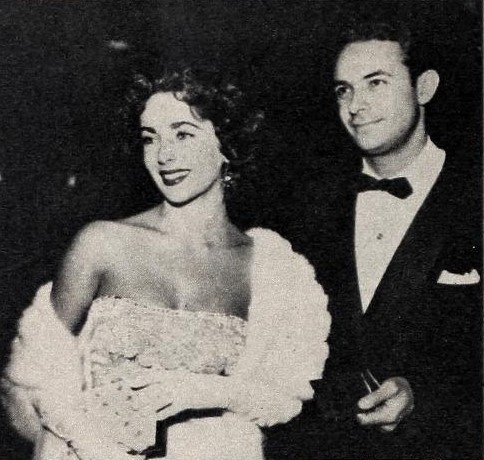
Elizabeth Taylor and Stanley Donen, c. 1952

Now established as a successful film director, Donen continued his solo career at MGM with Fearless Fagan (1952). Based on a true story, the film stars Carleton Carpenter as a GI who brings his tame lion with him when he joins the army. Donen's musical Give a Girl a Break (1953) stars Debbie Reynolds, Marge Champion and Helen Wood as three aspiring dancers competing for the lead in a new Broadway musical. Bob Fosse, Gower Champion and Kurt Kasznar also appear, with music by Burton Lane and Ira Gershwin. The "Give a Girl a Break" dance between Reynolds and Fosse was choreographed backwards and then played in reverse to create the illusion that the two are surrounded by hundreds of balloons that instantly appear at the touch of their fingers. Shooting the film became a bitter experience for Donen due to a major on-set fight over the film's choreography between Fosse and Gower Champion. The film was not well reviewed upon release, but its reputation has grown over time.

Donen solidified his solo career and scored another hit with the musical Seven Brides for Seven Brothers (1954). Based on a short story by Stephen Vincent Benét, the film's music is by Saul Chaplin and Gene de Paul, with lyrics by Johnny Mercer and choreography by Michael Kidd. Jane Powell plays Milly, an 1850s frontierswoman who marries Adam (Howard Keel) only hours after meeting him. When she returns with Adam to his log cabin in the Oregon backwoods, Milly discovers that her husband's six brothers are uncivilized and oafish. She makes it her mission to domesticate them and, upon Milly's sarcastic suggestion, the brothers kidnap six women from a neighboring town to marry them. The film was shot in the new CinemaScope format and is remembered for its dance sequences, particularly the "barn raising scene" in which architecture and construction become acrobatic ballet steps. Seven Brides for Seven Brothers was one of the highest-grossing films of 1954 and appeared on many critics' 10 Best Films lists. It was nominated for five Academy Awards, including Best Picture and Best Music (Scoring of a Musical Picture), which it won. Its success was a surprise to MGM, which invested more money in two other musicals: Rose Marie and Brigadoon, starring Kelly. Seven Brides for Seven Brothers was more profitable than either of the other films, as well as On the Town and Singin' in the Rain, and its success was a major turning point for Donen's career. The film was later criticized by novelist Francine Prose, who described it as anti-woman, calling it "one of the most repulsive movies about men and women that has ever been made" and a musical about rape.

Deep in My Heart (1954), is Donen's biographical film concerning Sigmund Romberg, the Hungarian-born American operetta composer. Starring José Ferrer, the film included cameos by many MGM contract actors, including the only screen pairing of Gene Kelly and his brother Fred. Although it received mediocre reviews, Romberg's status helped make the film a hit.

Donen's third and final directorial collaboration with Kelly was It's Always Fair Weather (1955), another musical. It was produced by Freed, written by Comden and Green and the score was by André Previn. It starred Kelly, Dan Dailey, Cyd Charisse, Michael Kidd, and Dolores Gray. Envisioned as a sequel to On the Town, Kelly, Dailey and Kidd play three ex-GIs who reunite 10 years after World War II and discover that none of their lives have turned out how they had expected. Kelly approached Donen with the project and at first Donen was reluctant due to his own success. Their friendship deteriorated during production and Donen noted, "the atmosphere from day one was very tense and nobody was speaking to anybody." He called it a "one hundred percent nightmare" which was a "struggle from beginning to end". This time, MGM refused to allow the co-directors to shoot on location in New York. It's Always Fair Weather was moderately profitable, but not as successful as their previous two films. It was Donen's last film with Kelly or Freed. After its completion he fulfilled his MGM contract agreement by working with other studios. His last project for MGM was completing the final four days of shooting on Kismet in July 1955 for director Vincente Minnelli.

=== 1956–1959: director and independent producer ===
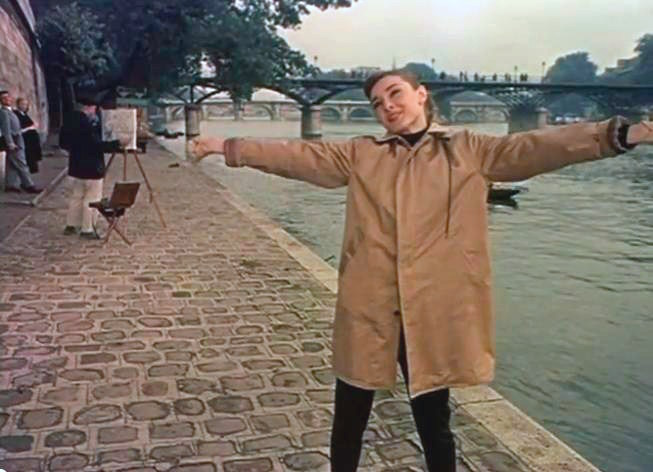
Audrey Hepburn in Funny Face

Donen's next film was at Paramount Pictures for producer Roger Edens. Funny Face (1957) contains four of the original George and Ira Gershwin songs from the otherwise unrelated 1927 Broadway musical of the same name that had starred Fred Astaire. Loosely based on the life of fashion photographer Richard Avedon, who was also the visual consultant and designed the opening title sequence for the film, it was written by Leonard Gershe and included additional music by Gershe and Edens. Donen and Edens began pre-production at MGM, but had difficulty juggling Astaire and Audrey Hepburn's Paramount contracts, the Warner Brothers-owned rights to the Gershwin music that they wanted and their own MGM contracts. Eventually a deal was reached that both released Donen from his MGM contract and allowed him to make his next two films at Paramount and Warner Brothers respectively. Astaire plays an aging fashion photographer who discovers the intellectual bohemian Hepburn at a used bookstore in Greenwich Village and turns her into his new model while falling in love with her in Paris. Donen, Avedon and cinematographer Ray June collaborated to give the film an abstract, smokey look that resembled the fashion photography of the period despite protests by Paramount, which had recently invested in the sharp VistaVision film format. Funny Face was screened in competition at the 1957 Cannes Film Festival and received good reviews from critics like Bosley Crowther. Sight & Sound, in contrast, accused it of being anti-intellectual.

While in pre-production on Funny Face, Donen received a letter from his old boss George Abbott inviting him to make a film version of Abbott's stage hit The Pajama Game at Warner Brothers. As part of the deal to secure the Warner-owned Gershwin music he wanted for Funny Face, Donen accepted the offer and he and Abbott co-directed the film version. The Pajama Game (1957) stars Doris Day and John Raitt, with music by Richard Adler and Jerry Ross and choreography by Bob Fosse. Raitt plays a plant supervisor at a nightwear factory who is in constant disputes with the plant's union organizer (Day), until they end up falling in love. Donen described his working relationship with Abbott as relaxed, stating that "[Abbott would] play tennis, come watch on the set for an hour, then watch the rushes, then go home." It was only a modest financial success, but Jean-Luc Godard praised it and declared "Donen is surely the master of the movie musical. The Pajama Game exists to prove it."

Donen's next film was Kiss Them for Me (also 1957). He was personally asked by Cary Grant to direct and began developing it while still under contract at MGM. With a plot that strongly resembles On the Town, the film features Grant, Ray Walston and Larry Blyden as three navy officers on leave in San Francisco in 1944. Unlike On the Town, Kiss Them for Me is a dark comedy that contrasts the officers' selfless heroism with their self-absorbed hedonism while on leave. The film received mostly poor reviews.

After three films released in 1957, Donen became an independent producer and director. He had reluctantly agreed to direct Kiss Them for Me on condition that 20th Century Fox buy out his remaining contract with MGM. Now free from contractual obligations, he formed Grandon Productions with Grant and signed a distribution deal through Warner Brothers. Donen would self-produce nearly all of his films for the rest of his career, sometimes under the name "Stanley Donen Productions". Donen and Grant inaugurated their company with Indiscreet (1958), based on a play by Norman Krasna and starring Grant and Ingrid Bergman. Because of Bergman's schedule, the film was shot on location in London. Bergman plays a famous and reclusive actress who falls in love with the supposedly married playboy-diplomat Grant. When Bergman discovers that he has been lying about having a wife, she concocts a charade with another man in order to win Grant's full affection. A scene in the film involves Donen's clever circumvention of the strict Production Code. In the scene, Grant is in Paris while Bergman is still in London and the two exchange pillow talk over the phone. Donen used a split screen of the two stars with synchronized movements to make it appear as though they were in the same bed together. The film was a financial and critical success, and Donen was compared to such directors as Ernst Lubitsch and George Cukor.

Donen briefly returned to the musical genre with Damn Yankees! (also 1958), based on George Abbott's Broadway hit. He again co-directed with Abbott in the same hands-off collaboration as their first film. Like The Pajama Game the film includes music by Adler and Ross and choreography by Fosse. It starred Tab Hunter, Gwen Verdon, and Ray Walston. Damn Yankees! is an adaptation of the Faust legend about a fan of the Washington Senators who would sell his soul to give the losing team a good hitter. Walston plays the Brooks Brothers-attired Devil who grants the fan his wish and transforms him into the muscular young hitter Joe Hardy (Hunter). Donen was able to shoot three real Senator–Yankee games on location with seven hidden cameras. The low-budget film was a moderate financial success and received good reviews. It was also Donen's last musical film until The Little Prince (1974).

=== 1960–1969: United Kingdom ===
After Indiscreet Donen made England his home until the early 1970s. Musicals' waning popularity caused Donen to focus on comedy films. He observed that his "London base afforded me the advantage of being away from the Hollywood rat race. Just going your own way in spite of whatever anyone else is doing or in spite of what you've done already was satisfying. I also had the advantage of the European influence: their way of looking at life, of making movies." While in the UK in the early 1960s, Donen was praised as an early influence on the then-emerging British New Wave film movement.

In the late 1950s, Donen signed a non-exclusive, three-film deal with Columbia Pictures. His first film under this contract was Once More, with Feeling! (1960). Adapted by Harry Kurnitz from his own stage play, the film was shot in Paris and starred Yul Brynner as a tyrannical orchestra conductor whose mistress (Kay Kendall) grows tired of his tantrums and plots to marry him in order to quickly divorce him for his money. Kendall was terminally ill with leukemia during the shoot and died before its release. The film was not successful financially or critically.

Donen quickly re-teamed with Brynner and Kurnitz for the film Surprise Package (also 1960). In this film Brynner plays an American gangster who is deported to the Greek island of Rhodes. Mitzi Gaynor plays the "surprise package" who is sent to the island to appease Brynner, and Noël Coward plays the King of Rhodes whom Brynner plots to dethrone. The film was not a financial success, and Donen stated that it was made because he "desperately needed money for personal reasons." These were the only two films that Donen completed for his Columbia contract. The studio cancelled the deal after their poor box-office returns, and Donen was unable to produce the projects that he was pursuing at that time: playwright Robert Bolt's A Man for All Seasons and A Patch of Blue, both of which became successful films for other directors.

Grandon Productions produced Donen's next film: The Grass Is Greener, released through Universal Pictures in December 1960. Cary Grant and Deborah Kerr play the earl and countess of a large estate in England who are forced to permit guided tours of their mansion in order to help their financial problems. Robert Mitchum plays an American oil tycoon who falls in love with Kerr and Jean Simmons plays an eccentric American heiress who is Grant's former girlfriend. The film was a financial disappointment in the United States, but was successful in England where the original stage version had been a West End hit.

Charade (full film)

One of Donen's most praised films was Charade (1963), starring Cary Grant, Audrey Hepburn, Walter Matthau, James Coburn, George Kennedy and Ned Glass. Donen said that he had "always wanted to make a movie like one of my favorites, Hitchcock's North by Northwest" and the film has been referred to as "the best Hitchcock movie that Hitchcock never made." Charade was produced by Stanley Donen Productions, released through Universal and adapted by Peter Stone from his own novel. Reggie Lampert (Hepburn) discovers that her husband has been murdered and (at least) three sinister men are all searching for the $250,000 in gold that he had hidden somewhere. Peter Joshua (Grant) befriends Reggie and helps her fight off the three thugs while the two begin to fall in love. The film was released in December 1963, only two weeks after the assassination of US President John F. Kennedy, and the word "assassinate" had to be redubbed twice. It was Donen's most financially successful film and influenced a number of romantic comedy-thrillers released in the years following it. Film critic Judith Crist called it a "stylish and amusing melodrama", and Pauline Kael said it had "a freshness and spirit that makes [it] unlike the films of any other country" and was "probably the best American film of [1963]". It was remade as The Truth About Charlie (2002), directed by Jonathan Demme.

Donen made another Hitchcock-inspired film with Arabesque (1966), starring Gregory Peck and Sophia Loren. The film was written by Julian Mitchell and Stanley Price, with an uncredited rewrite by Peter Stone. Peck plays an American professor at Oxford University who is an expert in ancient hieroglyphics. He is approached by a Middle Eastern prime minister to investigate an organization that is attempting to assassinate him and uses hieroglyphic codes to communicate. The investigation leads Peck to one mystery after another, often involving the prime minister's mysterious mistress (Loren). The film was Donen's second consecutive hit.

Donen made Two for the Road (1967), starring Audrey Hepburn and Albert Finney with Eleanor Bron, William Daniels, and Jacqueline Bisset in supporting roles. The film was conceived by Donen and written by novelist Frederic Raphael, who was nominated for an Academy Award. It has been called one of Donen's most personal films, "with glints of passion never disclosed before", and "a veritable textbook on film editing." The film's complicated and non-linear story is about the 12-year relationship between Hepburn and Finney over the course of four separate (but interwoven) road trips that they take together throughout the years in the south of France. It was moderately successful at the box-office while the critical reception was extremely mixed. Bosley Crowther called the film "just another version of commercial American trash." It is also the film that Donen said he was most frequently asked about by film students.

While living in England, Donen became an admirer of the British stage revue Beyond the Fringe and wished to work with two of the show's participants, Peter Cook and Dudley Moore. The resulting film was Bedazzled (1967), an updated version of the Faust legend. It was written by Cook with music by Moore, and also starred Eleanor Bron and Raquel Welch. Moore plays a lonely young man whose unrequited love of his co-worker (Bron) drives him to attempt suicide. Just then the devil (Cook) appears and offers him seven wishes in exchange for his soul. The film's fun-loving association with the Swinging London of the 1960s divided critics, but Roger Ebert called its satire "barbed and contemporary ... dry and understated", and overall, a "magnificently photographed, intelligent, very funny film." On the other hand, Time magazine called it the feeblest of all known variations on the Faust theme. The film was a hit and was especially popular among American college students. Donen considered it a favorite among his own films and called it "a very personal film in that I said a great deal about what I think is important in life." It was remade as Bedazzled (2000) by director Harold Ramis.

Staircase (1969) is Donen's adaptation of the autobiographical stage play by Charles Dyer with music by Dudley Moore. Rex Harrison and Richard Burton star as a middle-aged gay couple who run a London barber shop and live together in a "bad marriage". The film was shot in Paris for tax purposes and was not a financial success. It received poor reviews upon release, but was re-evaluated by film critic Armond White in 2007. He called the film "a rare Hollywood movie to depict gay experience with wisdom, humor and warmth", and "a lost treasure".

=== 1970–2003: Later works ===
After Donen's marriage to Adelle Beatty ended, he moved back to Hollywood in 1970. Producer Robert Evans asked Donen to direct an adaptation of the beloved children's book The Little Prince first published in 1943. Lyricist Alan Jay Lerner and composer Frederick Loewe wrote the music and screenplay and filming was done on location in Tunisia. The Little Prince (1974) stars Steven Warner in the title role, with Richard Kiley, Bob Fosse, Gene Wilder and Donna McKechnie. It was Donen's first musical film since Damn Yankees! Although it contained very little dancing, Fosse choreographed his own dance scenes as the snake. Lerner stated that Donen "took it upon himself to change every tempo, delete musical phrases at will and distort the intention of every song until the entire score was unrecognizable." It was released in 1974 and was a financial disaster.

Donen's next film was Lucky Lady (1975), starring Liza Minnelli, Gene Hackman and Burt Reynolds. Minnelli plays a Prohibition era bootlegger who smuggles alcohol from Mexico to California with the help of Hackman and Reynolds, who both compete for her affection. Donen stated that he "really cared about [the film] and gave three years of my life to it ... I think it's a very good movie." It went over budget and was unsuccessful at the box office. Most critics were unenthusiastic; however, Jay Cocks praised the film for having "the glistening surface and full-throttle frivolity that characterized Hollywood films in the 1930s."

Nostalgia for old Hollywood movies would be a theme of Donen's next film: Movie Movie (1978), produced by Lew Grade's ITC Entertainment and scripted by Larry Gelbart and Sheldon Keller. The film is actually two shorter films presented as an old fashioned double feature, complete with a fake movie trailer and an introduction by comedian George Burns. It starred George C. Scott, Trish Van Devere, Red Buttons, Michael Kidd and Eli Wallach and premiered in competition at the 29th Berlin International Film Festival in 1978. The first of the two films is Dynamite Hands, a black and white tribute to boxing – morality films. The second film is Baxter's Beauties of 1933, a tribute to the extravagant musicals of Busby Berkeley. Like Donen's previous two films, it was unsuccessful financially, although the reviews were more positive. In The New York Times, Vincent Canby called the film "Hollywood flimflamming at its elegant best."

Donen made the science fiction film Saturn 3 (1980), starring Kirk Douglas, Farrah Fawcett and Harvey Keitel. Donen first read the script when its writer (and Movie Movie's set designer) John Barry showed it to him, prompting Donen to pass it along to Lew Grade. Donen was initially hired to produce, but Grade asked him to complete the film when first-time director Barry was unable to direct. According to Donen "only a tiny bit of what Barry shot ended up in the finished film." It was a critical and financial disaster and initially Donen did not want to be credited as director. In the early 1980s, Donen was attached to direct an adaptation of Stephen King's The Dead Zone and worked with writer Jeffrey Boam on the script. Donen eventually dropped out of the project and David Cronenberg directed the film a few years later. Boam stated that Donen was initially attracted to making the film because he wanted to "connect with contemporary youthful audiences" and that the script that they worked on together was "very close to the script that David wound up making."

Donen's last theatrical film was Blame It on Rio (1984). The film is a remake of the Claude Berri film Un moment d'égarement (1977) and was written by Gelbart and Charlie Peters. It stars Michael Caine, Joseph Bologna, Michelle Johnson, Valerie Harper and Demi Moore and was shot on location in Rio de Janeiro. Caine and Bologna play wealthy executives on vacation with their families in Rio, where Caine has an affair with Bologna's teenage daughter (Johnson). It received poor reviews, but was a modest success financially.

In 1986, Donen produced the televised ceremony of the 58th Academy Awards, which included a musical performance of the song "Once a Star, Always a Star" with June Allyson, Leslie Caron, Marge Champion, Cyd Charisse, Kathryn Grayson, Howard Keel, Ann Miller, Jane Powell, Debbie Reynolds, and Esther Williams. Also in 1986 Donen directed a musical sequence for an episode of the popular TV series Moonlighting and directed the music video for Lionel Richie's song "Dancing on the Ceiling", which employed the same rotating-room filming techniques that he used in "You're All the World to Me" from Royal Wedding. In 1989 Donen was awarded an Honorary Doctorate in Fine Arts from the University of South Carolina. In his commencement address, Donen stated that he thought he was unique in being the first tap dancer to be a doctor and then tap danced for the graduates. At around the same time Donen taught a seminar on film musicals at the Sundance Institute at the request of Robert Redford.

In 1993, Donen was preparing to produce and direct a movie musical adaptation of Robert Louis Stevenson's Strange Case of Dr Jekyll and Mr Hyde starring Michael Jackson. After allegations that Jackson had molested young boys at his Neverland Ranch became a tabloid scandal, the project was abandoned. Later that year Donen directed the stage musical The Red Shoes (based on the Powell and Pressburger film) at the Gershwin Theatre. He replaced the original director Susan Schulman just six weeks before the show opened. It closed after four days.

Donen's last film was the television movie Love Letters, which aired in April 1999. The film starred Steven Weber and Laura Linney and was based on the play by A. R. Gurney. Weber plays a successful U.S. Senator who finds out that his long lost love (Linney) has recently died. The two had only corresponded through mail over the years, and Weber remembers Linney through his collection of old love letters. Donen had wanted to make a theatrical film version of the play, but was unable to secure financing from any major studio and instead took the project to ABC. In 2002 Donen directed Elaine May's musical play Adult Entertainment starring Danny Aiello and Jeannie Berlin in Stamford, Connecticut. In 2004 he was awarded the Career Golden Lion at the 61st Venice International Film Festival.

== Technical innovation ==
=== Style ===
Donen is credited with having made the transition of Hollywood musical films from realistic backstage dramas to a more integrated art form in which the songs were a natural continuation of the story. Before Donen and Kelly made their films, musicals – such as the extravagant and stylized work of Busby Berkeley – were often set in a Broadway stage environment where the musical numbers were part of a stage show. Donen and Kelly's films created a more cinematic form and included dances that could only be achieved in the film medium. Donen stated that what he was doing was a "direct continuation from the Astaire – Rogers musicals ... which in turn came from René Clair and from Lubitsch ... What we did was not geared towards realism but towards the unreal."

Donen is highly respected by film historians, but his career is often compared to Kelly's, and there is debate over who deserves more credit for their collaborations. Their relationship was complicated, both professionally and personally, but Donen's films as a solo director are generally better regarded by critics than Kelly's. French film critic Jean-Pierre Coursodon has said that Donen's contribution to the evolution of the Hollywood musical "outshines anybody else's, including Vincente Minnelli's". David Quinlan called him "the King of the Hollywood musicals".

=== Cine-dance ===
Donen made a host of critically acclaimed and popular films. His most important contribution to the art of film was helping to transition movie musicals from the realistic backstage settings of filmed theater to a more cinematic form that integrates film with dance. Eventually film scholars named this concept "cine-dance" (a dance that can only be created in the medium of film), and its origins are in the Donen/Kelly films. Film scholar Casey Charness described "cine-dance" as "a melding of the distinctive strengths of dancing and filmmaking that had never been done before" and adds that Donen and Kelly "seem to have elevated Hollywood dance from simplistic display of either dancing or photographic ability into a perception that incorporates both what the dancer can do and what the camera can see ... [They] developed a balance between camera and dancer that ... encouraged both photographer and choreographer to contribute significantly to the creation and final effectiveness of dance."

When "talkies" began to gain momentum in the film industry, the Hollywood studios recruited the best talent from Broadway to make musical films, such as Broadway Melody and Berkeley's 42nd Street. These films established the backstage musical, a subgenre in which the plot revolves around a stage show and the people involved in putting it on. They set the standard for the musical genre, placing their musical numbers either within the context of a stage performance or tacked on and gratuitous, without furthering the story or developing the characters. Donen stated that he disliked them and that his own films were "a reaction against those backstage musicals." Donen credited producer Freed as the driving force behind the transition, adding that Freed "had some sort of instinct to change the musical from a backstage world into something else. He didn't quite know what to change it into, just that it had to change." Kelly stated that Donen was the only person he knew that understood how musicals could progress and better suit the film medium.

=== Techniques ===
Donen and Kelly's films set new standards for special effects, animation, editing and cinematography. Their first collaboration Cover Girl firmly established their intentions, particularly in the "Alter Ego" dance sequence. It employed a special effect that could not be achieved with a live take, while advancing the story and revealing the character's inner conflict. Donen and Kelly tested the limits of film's potential with the Jerry the Mouse dance in Anchors Aweigh, one of the first films where a live action character dances with an animated one.

By the time they made Take Me Out to the Ball Game they had perfected what Martin Rubin called an "indication of changing trends in musical films" which differed from the Berkeley spectacles towards "relatively small-scale affairs that place the major emphasis on comedy, transitions to the narrative, the cleverness of the lyrics and the personalities and performance skills of the stars, rather than on spectacle and group dynamics." Rubin credits Donen and Kelly with making musicals more realistic, compared to Berkeley's style of a "separation of narrative space from performance space" Take Me Out to the Ball Game was Berkeley's last film as a director and today can be viewed as a passing of the torch. Both Donen and Kelly found working with Berkeley difficult, and the director left before the film's completion.

When Donen and Kelly released On the Town, they boldly opened the film with an extravagant musical number shot on location in New York with fast-paced editing and experimental camera work, thus breaking from the conventions of that time. Their most celebrated film Singin' in the Rain is appropriately a musical about the birth of the movie musical. The film includes a musical montage which Donen said was "doing Busby Berkeley here, only we're making fun of him." Charness stated that Singin' in the Rain's references to Berkeley "marks the first time the Hollywood musical had ever been reflexive, and amused at its own extravagant non-dancing inadequacy, at that" and that Berekeley's "overhead kaleidoscope floral pattern is predominantly featured, as is the line of tap-dancing chorines, who are seen only from the knees down." Charness also stated that the film's cinematography "moves the audience perspective along with the dance."

Charness singled out the film's famous title number and states, "it's a very kinetic moment, for though there is no technically accomplished dance present, the feeling of swinging around in a circle with an open umbrella is a brilliantly apt choice of movement, one that will be readily identifiable by an audience which might know nothing kinesthetically of actual dance ... Accompanying this movement is a breathless pullback into a high crane shot that takes place at the same time Kelly is swinging into his widest arcs with the umbrella. The effect is dizzying. Perhaps the finest single example of the application of camera know-how to a dance moment in Donen-Kelly canon." He also complimented Donen's direction in the "Moses Supposes" number, including "certain camera techniques which Donen had by now formularized ... the dolly shot into medium shot to signify the ending of one shot and the beginning of another." Although Donen credits earlier musicals by René Clair, Lubitsch and Astaire as "integrated", he also states that "in the early musicals of Lubitsch and Clair, they made it clear from the beginning that their characters were going to sing operatically. Gene and I didn't go that far. In 'Moses Supposes', he and Donald sort of talk themselves into a song." Donen's Royal Wedding and Give A Girl A Break continued to use special effect shots to create elaborate dance sequences.

== Relationship with Gene Kelly ==
Donen's relationship with Gene Kelly was complicated and he often spoke bitterly about his former friend and mentor decades after they worked together. Kelly was never explicitly negative about Donen in later years. However, Silverman has asserted that Kelly's comments were often condescending and demonstrated "a long-standing attempt to diminish Donen's contributions to their collective work." The reasons for their conflict were both personal (both men married dancer Jeanne Coyne) and professional (Donen always felt that Kelly did not treat him as an equal). They disagreed over who deserved more credit for their joint projects: three films as co-directors and four as co-choreographers.

=== Jeanne Coyne ===
Jeanne Coyne with Kelly (far right) in 1958. Coyne married Donen in 1948 and later married Kelly in 1960.

At age 7 Coyne enrolled in the Gene Kelly Studio of Dance in Johnstown, Pennsylvania and developed a schoolgirl crush on him In her twenties she was cast in Best Foot Forward, where she reconnected with Kelly and first met Donen, later moving to Hollywood with them. She and Donen eloped in 1948, but their marriage became strained. They separated in 1950 and divorced in 1951. During their marriage Donen confided to Coyne his frustration with Kelly while making On the Town, only to find that she immediately took Kelly's side. Coyne worked as Kelly's personal assistant on several films while married to Donen and continued assisting Kelly until her death. Rumors held that Kelly and Coyne were having an affair both during and after Coyne's marriage to Donen, as well as that Donen was in love with Kelly's first wife Betsy Blair. Blair's autobiography makes no mention of an affair between Kelly and Coyne nor of any romantic relationship with Donen. However, she does state that Donen's marriage to Coyne was unhappy and that Donen was very close to both her and Kelly.

Kelly said that Donen's impulsive marriage to Coyne showed an emotional immaturity and lack of good judgment, and stated that "Jeannie's marriage to Stanley was doomed from the start. Because every time Stanley looked at Jeannie, he saw Betsy, whom he loved; and every time Jeannie looked at Stanley, I guess she saw me. One way or another it was all pretty incestuous." Kelly's marriage to Blair ended in 1957, after which he moved in with Coyne. They married in 1960 and had two children together. Coyne died of leukemia in 1973. In November 2012 the musical What a Glorious Feeling depicted both the making of Singin' in the Rain and the love triangle among Donen, Kelly and Coyne.

=== Professional conflict ===
Donen and Kelly's relationship has been described as similar to that of the characters Don Lockwood and Cosmo Brown in Singin' in the Rain, with Kelly as the star performer and Donen as his trusted sidekick. Kelly described Donen as being like a son to him and Donen initially idolized Kelly while finding him "cold, egotistical and very rough." Although Donen credited Kelly for "jump-starting his career as a filmmaker", he said that MGM producer Roger Edens was his biggest promoter.

Many people believe that Donen owed everything to Kelly, and Kelly biographer Clive Hirschhorn described Donen as having "no particular identity or evident talent ... and was just a kid from the south who wanted to make it in show business." Donen stated that he moved to Hollywood of his own accord; other sources state that he followed Kelly, who then helped him get his first job. Kelly sometimes embarrassed and patronized Donen in public, such as berating him for not being able to keep up with his dance steps during the rehearsals for Cover Girl. Donen admitted that he did not consider himself to be a great performer. Despite Donen's growing resentment of Kelly, he was able to contain his feelings and professional attitude during their collaborations. Tensions between the two exploded on the set of It's Always Fair Weather. After Donen's recent hits Deep in My Heart and Seven Brides for Seven Brothers he did not want to make another film with Kelly. They fought on the set for the first time, with the now more confident Donen asserting himself. Donen almost quit the film, and his friendship with Kelly ended.

Other tensions included Donen's hit films as compared to Vincente Minnelli's Brigadoon (which Kelly was closely involved in and had wanted to direct) and Kelly's own ambitious film Invitation to the Dance, both of which were financially unsuccessful. During the shooting of Seven Brides for Seven Brothers, Donen often complained about his budgetary constraints, while Brigadoon had a much larger budget. Around this time Kelly's attempts at dramatic acting with The Devil Makes Three (1952) and Seagulls Over Sorrento (1954) flopped, and his marriage to Betsy Blair was coming to an end.

In later years, Donen would state that he had nothing nice to say about Kelly. At a 1991 tribute to Comden and Green, Kelly said in a public speech that Donen "needed [him] to grow up with" but added "I needed Stanley at the back of the camera." He also described Donen as being thought of as his whipping-boy at MGM. Although Donen often complained that Kelly never gave him enough credit for their work, Kelly did credit him for the Jerry the Mouse and "Alter Ego" dance sequences. In 1992 Donen said "I'm grateful to him, but I paid back the debt, ten times over. And he got his money's worth out of me." Betsy Blair claimed to be "surprised and bemused" about Donen's bitterness towards Kelly.

=== Directorial careers ===
The relative importance of the two men's contributions has been debated by critics. David Thomson wrote about "the problem in assessing [Donen's] career: who did what in their collaboration? And what is Donen's real standing as a director?" Thomson remarked that "nothing in his career suggests that Gene Kelly could have filmed himself singing in the rain with the exhilaration of Donen's retreating crane shot." However, set reports state that Kelly rode the camera boom between shots and during camera set-ups. Donen stated that "by the time you hash it through from beginning to end ten million times, you can't remember who did what except in a few instances where you remember getting an idea." Composer Saul Chaplin said that "Gene was the prime mover and Stanley an eager and talented pupil." During the shooting of On the Town, all memos and correspondence from MGM to the production were addressed exclusively to Donen and not to Kelly.

However, actress Kathleen Freeman stated that when people visited the set of Singin' in the Rain to relate their experiences during the silent era, they would ask to speak with Kelly. Singin' in the Rain art director Randall Duell stated "Gene ran the show. Stan had some good ideas and worked with Gene, but he was still the 'office boy' to Gene, in a sense, although Gene had great respect for him." Kelly became more involved with the Singin' in the Rain script during its third draft, which was when its structure began to resemble the final version. Comparing Donen and Kelly's films as solo directors, Donen's were usually more critically acclaimed and financially successful than Kelly's films. Kelly's film Hello, Dolly! (1969) is credited with effectively killing the Hollywood musical.

== Personal life ==
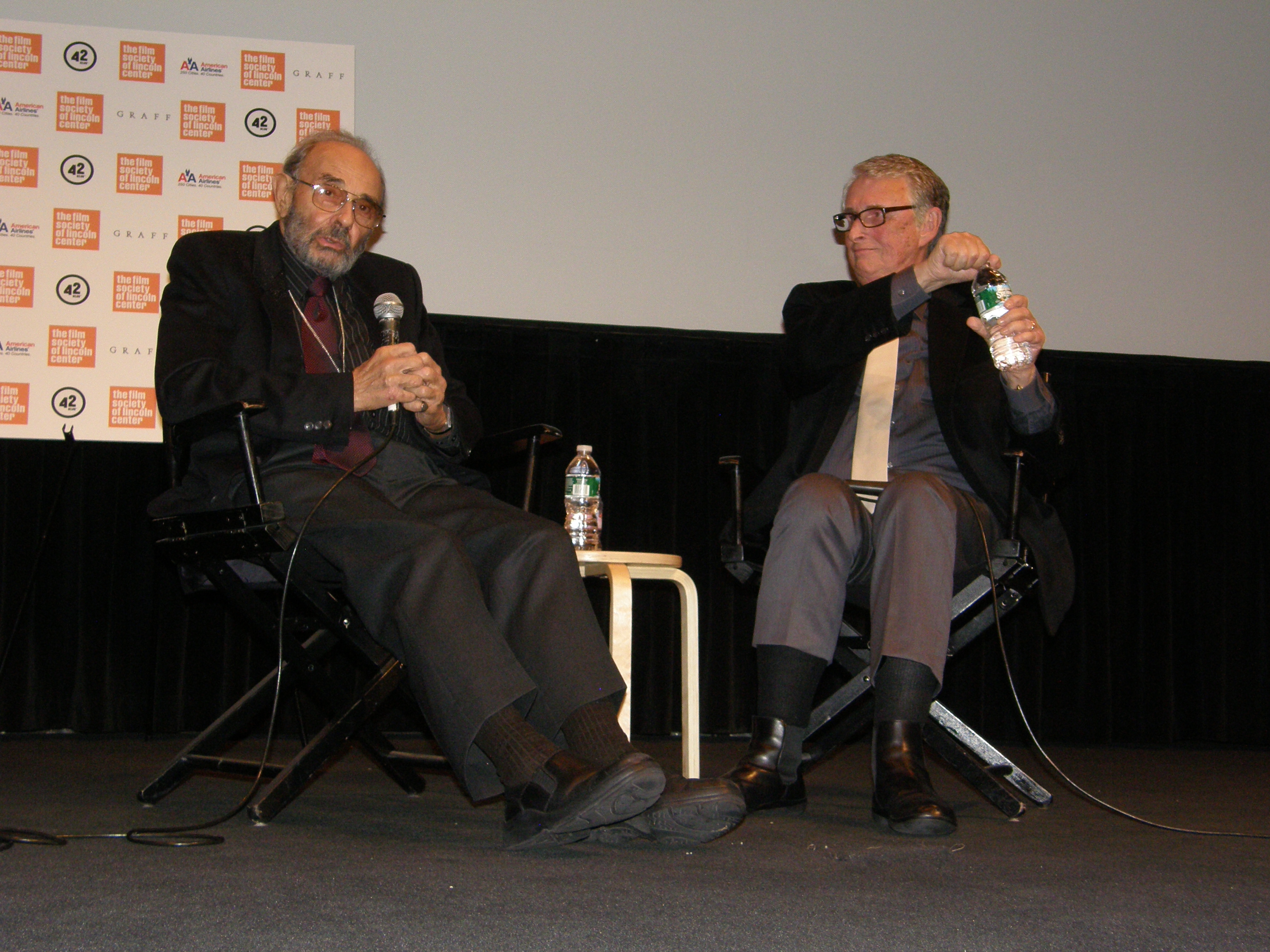
Donen with Mike Nichols at a 2010 Lincoln Center retrospective

Donen married and divorced five times and had three children. His first wife was dancer, choreographer and actress Jeanne Coyne. They married on April 14, 1948, and divorced in May 1951. Donen's second wife was actress Marion Marshall, who had been the girlfriend and protégé of Howard Hawks and later married actor Robert Wagner. Donen and Marshall had two sons together: Peter Donen (1953–2003) and Joshua Donen, born in 1955. The boys' first names put together provided the name for Cary Grant's character in the 1963 movie Charade. Donen and Marshall were married from 1952 to 1959. They had a lengthy custody battle over their sons after Marshall married Wagner and Donen moved to England. Donen's third wife was Adelle, Countess Beatty. She had previously been the second wife of the 2nd Earl Beatty. They married in 1960, had one son (Mark Donen, born 1962), and lived together in London. They separated in 1969 and divorced in 1971. Donen's fourth wife was American actress Yvette Mimieux. They were married from 1972 to 1985, but remained close friends after their divorce. Donen's fifth wife was Pamela Braden, 36 years his junior. Donen proposed to her four days after having met her. They were married from 1990 to 1994.

In the early 1940s, Donen dated actress Judy Holliday while working on Broadway. He also dated Elizabeth Taylor for a year between his first and second marriages. In his final years Donen's longtime companion was writer and director Elaine May, whom he dated from 1999 until his death and claimed to have proposed marriage to "about 172 times."

Donen's eldest son, Peter Donen, was a visual effects artist who worked on such films as Superman III, Spaceballs, The Bourne Identity, and The Truth About Charlie. He also designed the title credits for Blame It on Rio. He died of a heart attack in 2003 at age 50. Donen's second son, Joshua Donen, is a film producer who worked on such films as The Quick and the Dead and Gone Girl. Mark Donen, Stanley's third son, worked as a production assistant on Blame It on Rio.

In 1959, Donen's father Mordecai died at 59 in Beaufort, South Carolina. His mother Helen died in 1989 at 84 in South Carolina, and Donen delivered the eulogy at her funeral.

With the deaths in the 2000s of Billy Wilder, George Sidney, Elia Kazan, Robert Wise, and Jules Dassin, Donen became the last surviving notable film director of Hollywood's Golden Age. In his final years he occasionally appeared at film festivals and retrospectives and continued to develop ideas for film projects. He was the subject of the 2010 documentary Stanley Donen: You Just Do It.

In December 2013 it was announced that Donen was in pre-production for a new film co-written with Elaine May, to be produced by Mike Nichols. A table reading of the script for potential investors included such actors as Christopher Walken, Charles Grodin, Ron Rifkin and Jeannie Berlin. In celebration of Donen's 90th birthday in 2014, a retrospective of his work, "A Lotta Talent and a Little Luck: A Celebration of Stanley Donen", was held from July to August in Columbia, South Carolina. It included a tour of Donen's childhood neighborhood, a lecture by Steven Silverman and film screenings at the Columbia Film Society Donen frequented as a child.

On February 21, 2019, Donen died at age 94 from heart failure in New York City, two months short of his 95th birthday. In addition to May, he is survived by two sons and a sister.

== Filmography ==
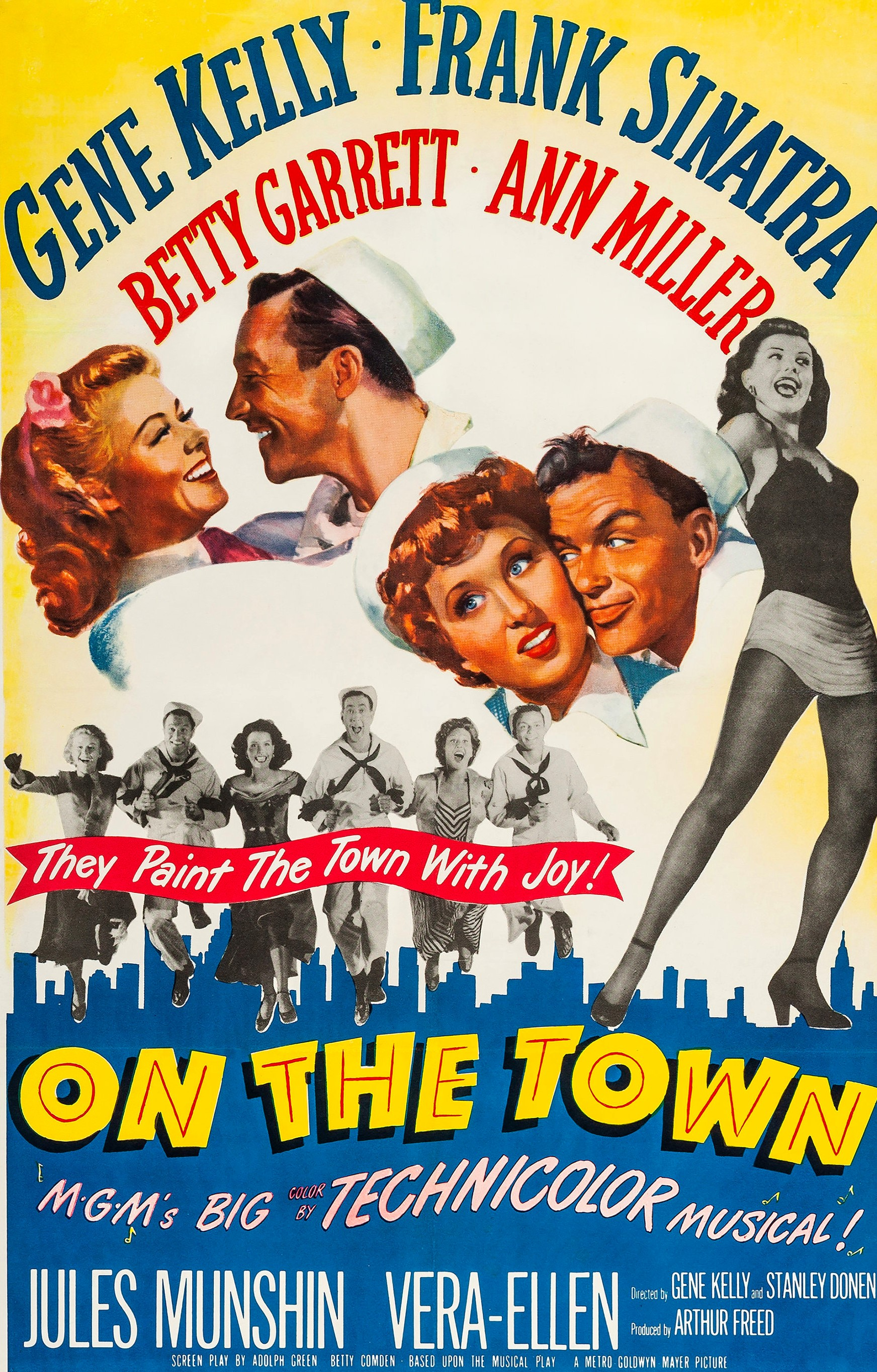
On the Town (1949)

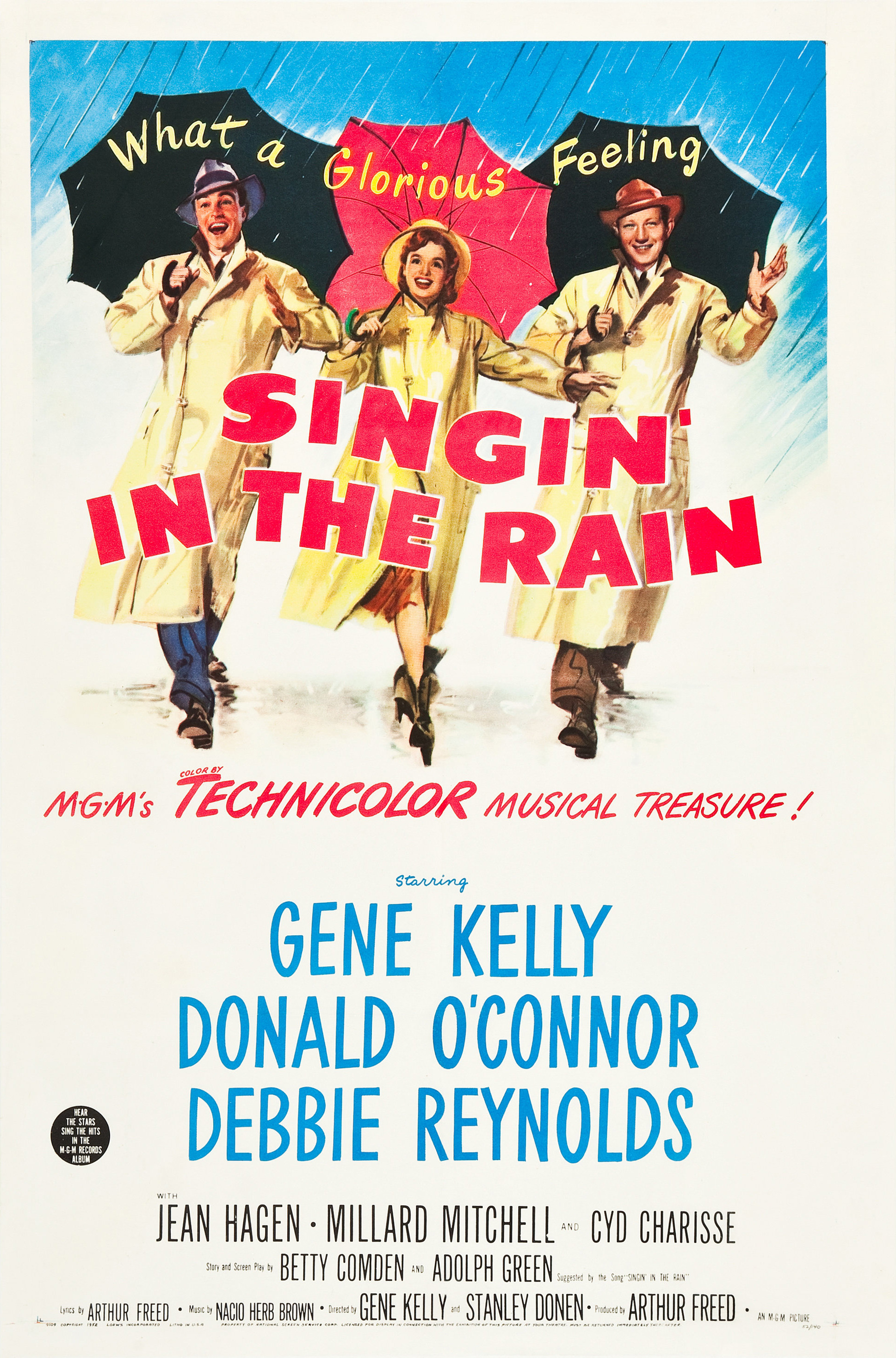
Singin' in the Rain (1952)

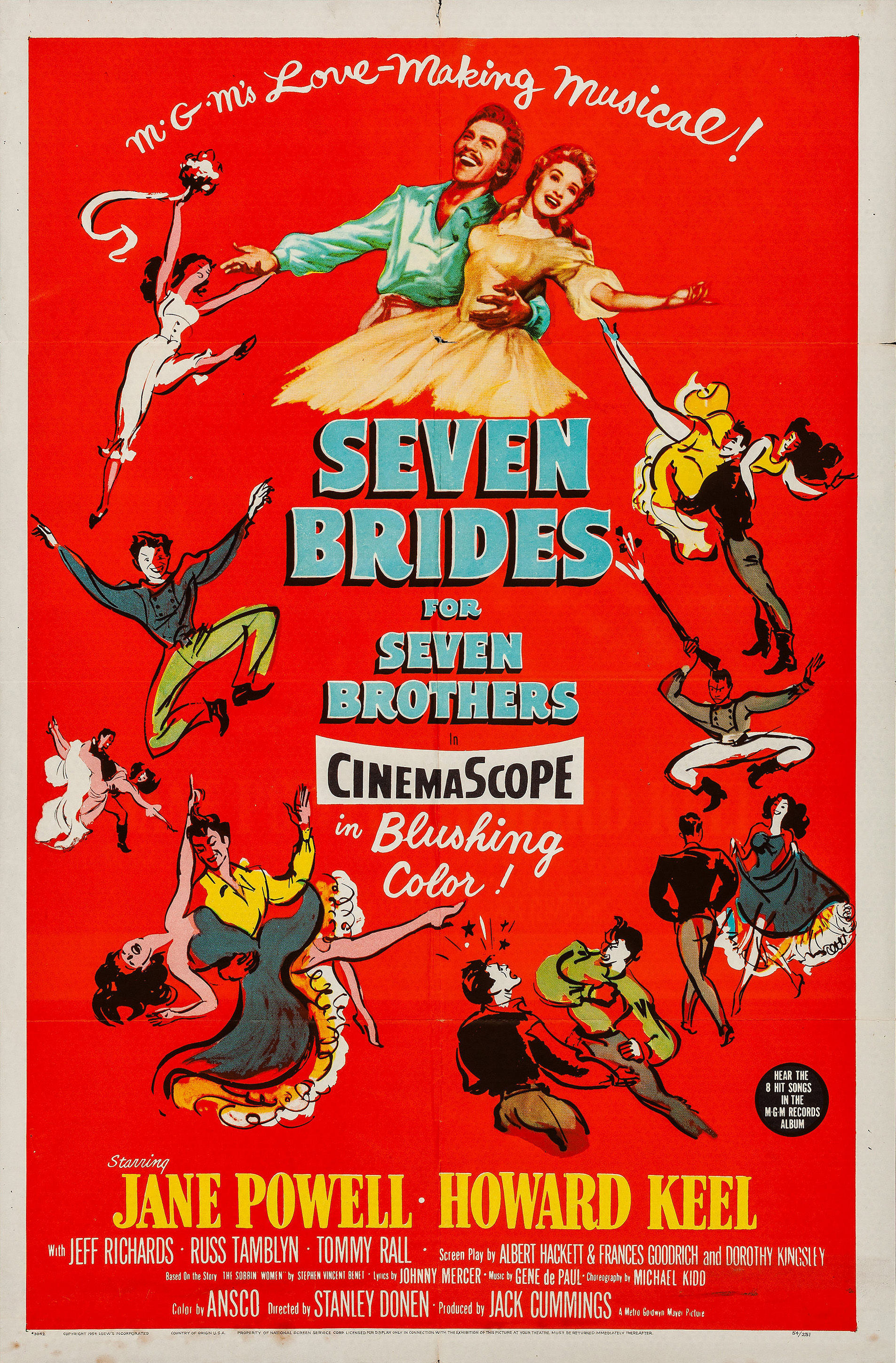
Seven Brides for Seven Brothers (1954)

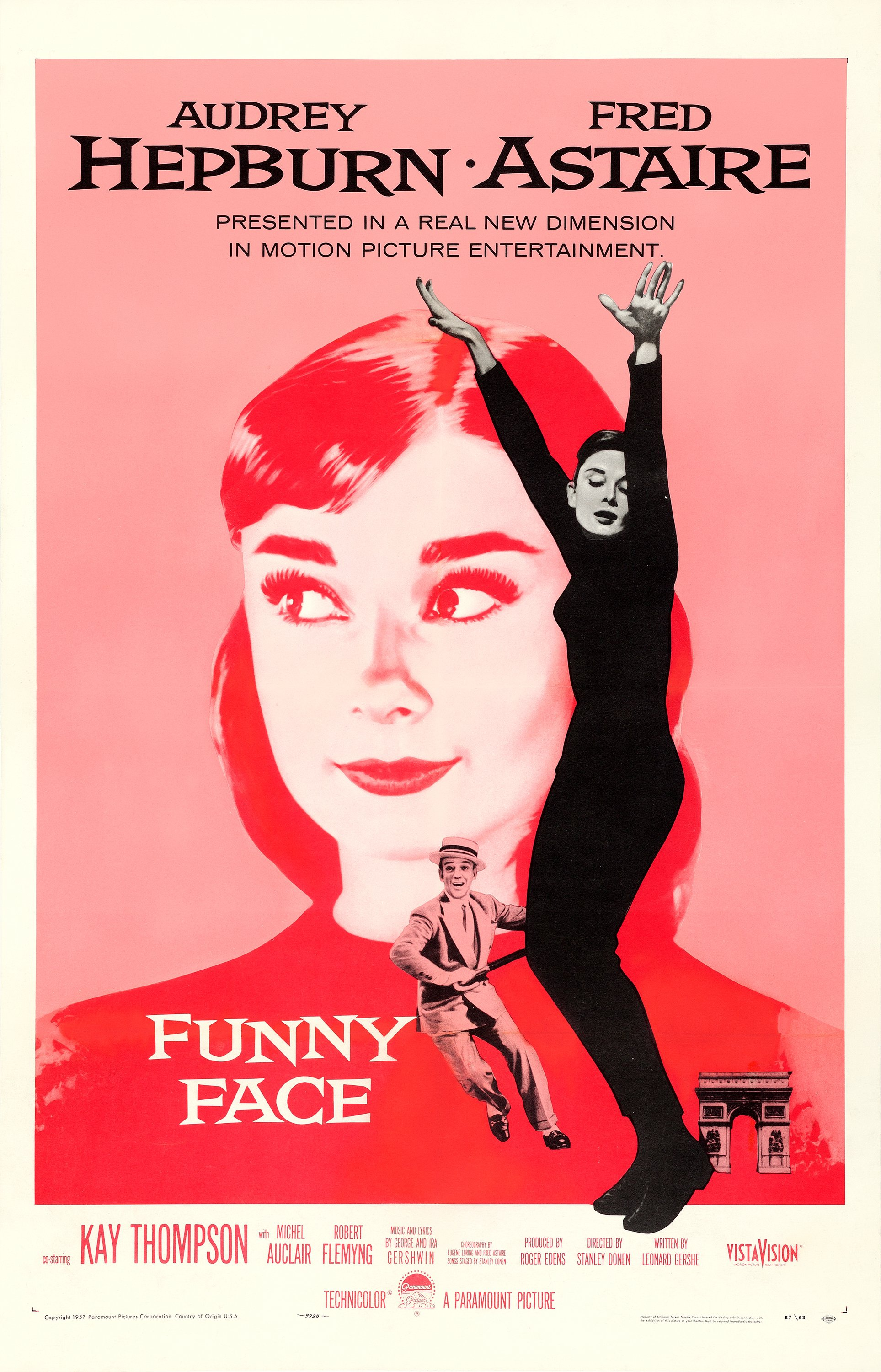
Funny Face (1957)

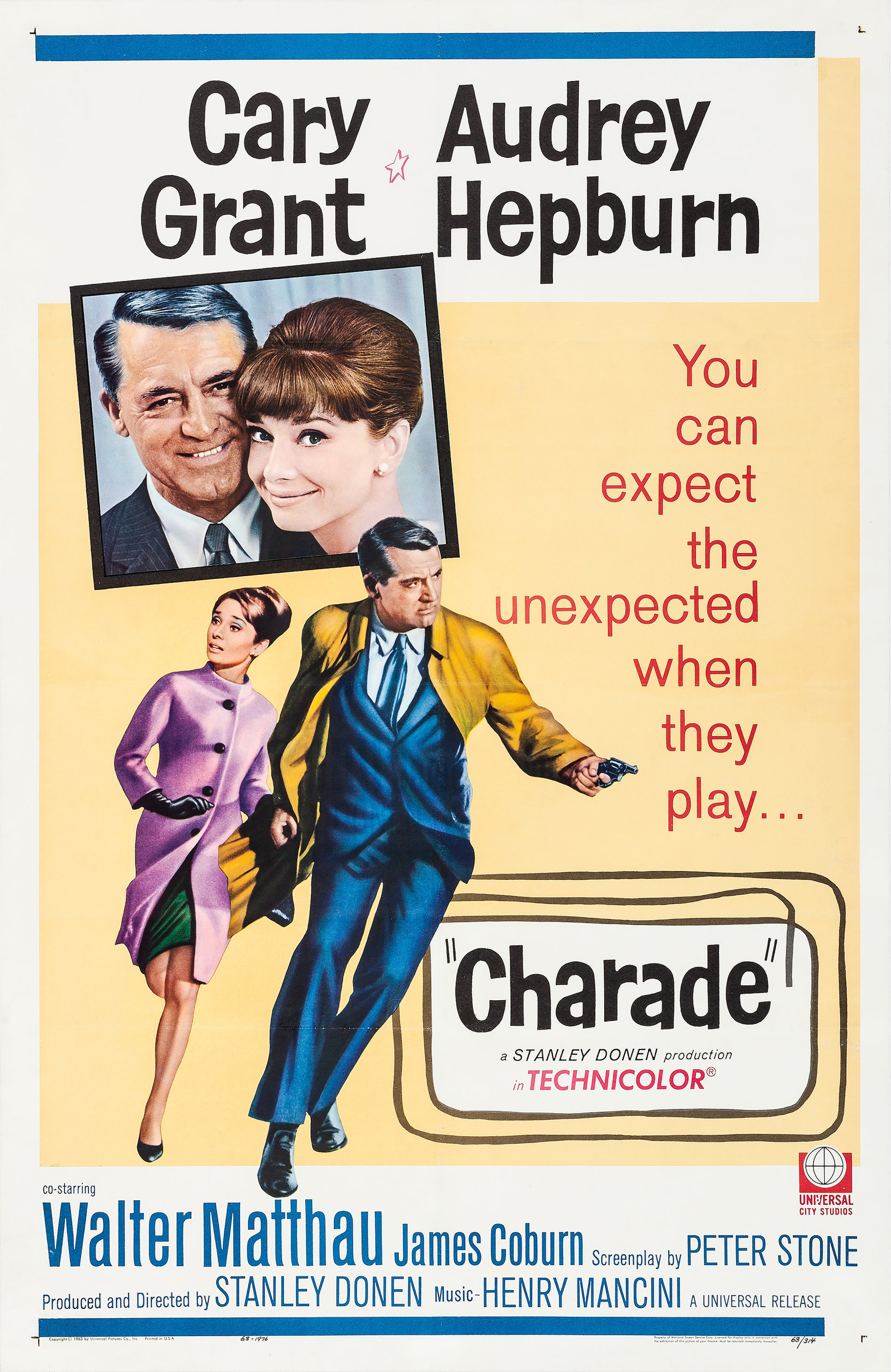
Charade (1963)

Selected filmography

Year	Title	Director	Producer	Notes	Ref.
1949	On the Town	Yes	No	co-directed with Gene Kelly	
1951	Royal Wedding	Yes	No		
1952	Love Is Better Than Ever	Yes	No		
1952	Singin' in the Rain	Yes	No	co-director with Gene Kelly also choreographer	
1954	Seven Brides for Seven Brothers	Yes	No		
1955	It's Always Fair Weather	Yes	No	co-director with Gene Kelly also choreographer	
1957	Funny Face	Yes	No		
1957	Kiss Them for Me	Yes	No		
1957	The Pajama Game	Yes	Yes	co-director with George Abbott	
1958	Indiscreet	Yes	Yes		
1958	Damn Yankees!	Yes	Yes	co-directed with George Abbott	
1960	Once More, with Feeling!	Yes	Yes		
1960	Surprise Package	Yes	Yes		
1960	The Grass Is Greener	Yes	Yes		
1963	Charade	Yes	Yes		
1966	Arabesque	Yes	Yes		
1967	Two for the Road	Yes	Yes		
1967	Bedazzled	Yes	Yes		
1969	Staircase	Yes	Yes		
1974	The Little Prince	Yes	Yes		
1975	Lucky Lady	Yes	No		
1978	Movie Movie	Yes	Yes		
1980	Saturn 3	Yes	Yes		
1984	Blame It on Rio	Yes	Yes		
1999	Love Letters	Yes	No	Television film	

== Honors and legacy ==
External videos
- Stanley Donen tribute and Life achievement award, Oscars, 10:24, February 1, 2012

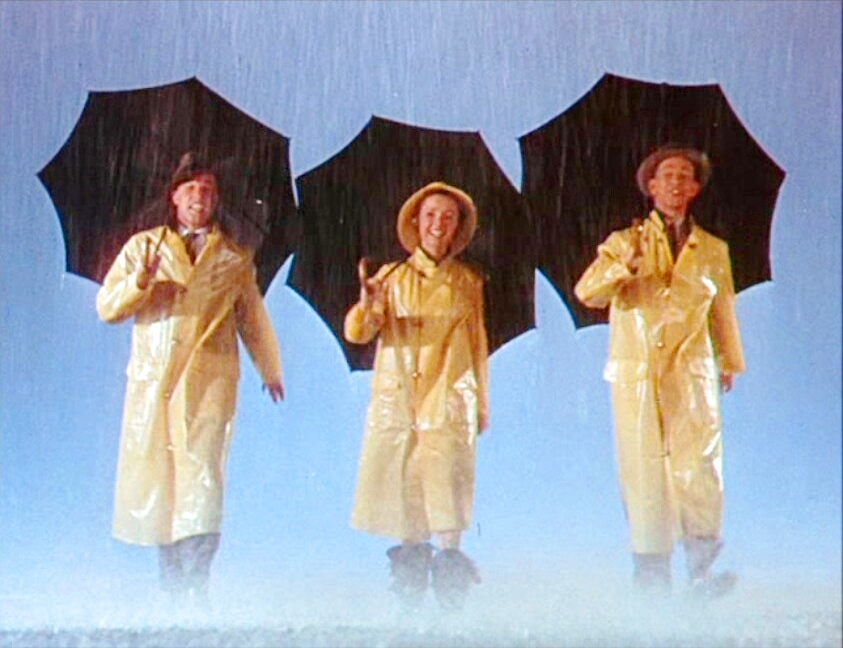
Kelly, Reynolds and O'Connor in the opening titles of Singin' in the Rain

During his career Donen's biggest rival was Vincente Minnelli, to whom he is often compared. Like Donen, Minnelli was a contract director at MGM known for the musicals he made for the Freed Unit. According to Donen's biographer Stephen M. Silverman, critics tend to "express a distinct preference for Donen's bold, no-nonsense style of direction over Minnelli's Impressionist visual palette and Expressionist character motivations", while most film directors are said to prefer Minnelli's work. Michael Kidd, who worked with both directors early in his career, describes Minnelli as being much less open to collaborative suggestions than Donen. The two directors' camera work differs in that Minnelli often used forward and backwards tracking shots while Donen preferred horizontal tracking shots and crane shots. Silverman said film critics consider Donen's approach to be better suited for dance sequences.

In 1998, Donen was chosen to receive the Honorary Academy Award at the 70th Academy Awards "in appreciation of a body of work marked by grace, elegance, wit and visual innovation." Film director Martin Scorsese was chosen to present the award to Donen. Scorsese gave tribute to Donen speaking about his career and his impact on film before playing a montage of his work in the movies from Singin' in the Rain, and Funny Face, to On the Town and Charade. In Donen's acceptance speech he danced with his Oscar statue while singing Irving Berlin's "Cheek to Cheek", a song first popularized by his boyhood idol Fred Astaire.

David Thomson dismisses most of his later comedy films, but praises him for leading "the musical in a triumphant and personal direction: out of doors ... Not even Minnelli can rival the fresh-air excitement of such sequences. And few can equal his integration of song, dance and story." Andrew Sarris dismisses Donen as being without a personal style of his own and as being dependent upon his collaborators on his better films. Debbie Reynolds downplayed his contributions to Singin' in the Rain, stating that "Stanley just operated the camera, because Stanley didn't dance."

Among Donen's admirers are film directors Woody Allen, Pedro Almodóvar, Lindsay Anderson, Charlie Chaplin, Damien Chazelle, Jules Dassin, Guillermo del Toro William Friedkin, Jean-Luc Godard, Stanley Kubrick, Christopher McQuarrie, Karel Reisz, Martin Scorsese, Steven Spielberg, François Truffaut, and Edgar Wright. Donen's skill as a director has been praised by such actors as Cyd Charisse, Mitzi Gaynor and Audrey Hepburn. Donen's work influenced later directors of film musicals Bill Condon, Rob Marshall, and Baz Luhrmann The 2011 film The Artist pays tribute to Singin' in the Rain (among other films), and Donen praised the film after attending its Los Angeles premiere.

Singin' in the Rain is Donen's most revered film and it was included in the first group of films to be inducted into the National Film Registry at the Library of Congress in 1989 and has been included on Sight & Sound's prestigious list of "Top Ten Films" twice, in 1982 and in 2002. Chaplin and Truffaut were among its earliest admirers. Billy Wilder called the film "one of the five greatest pictures ever made."

== See also ==
- List of atheists in film, radio, television and theater
