= Stephen M. Silverman =

American journalist and biographer (1951–2023)

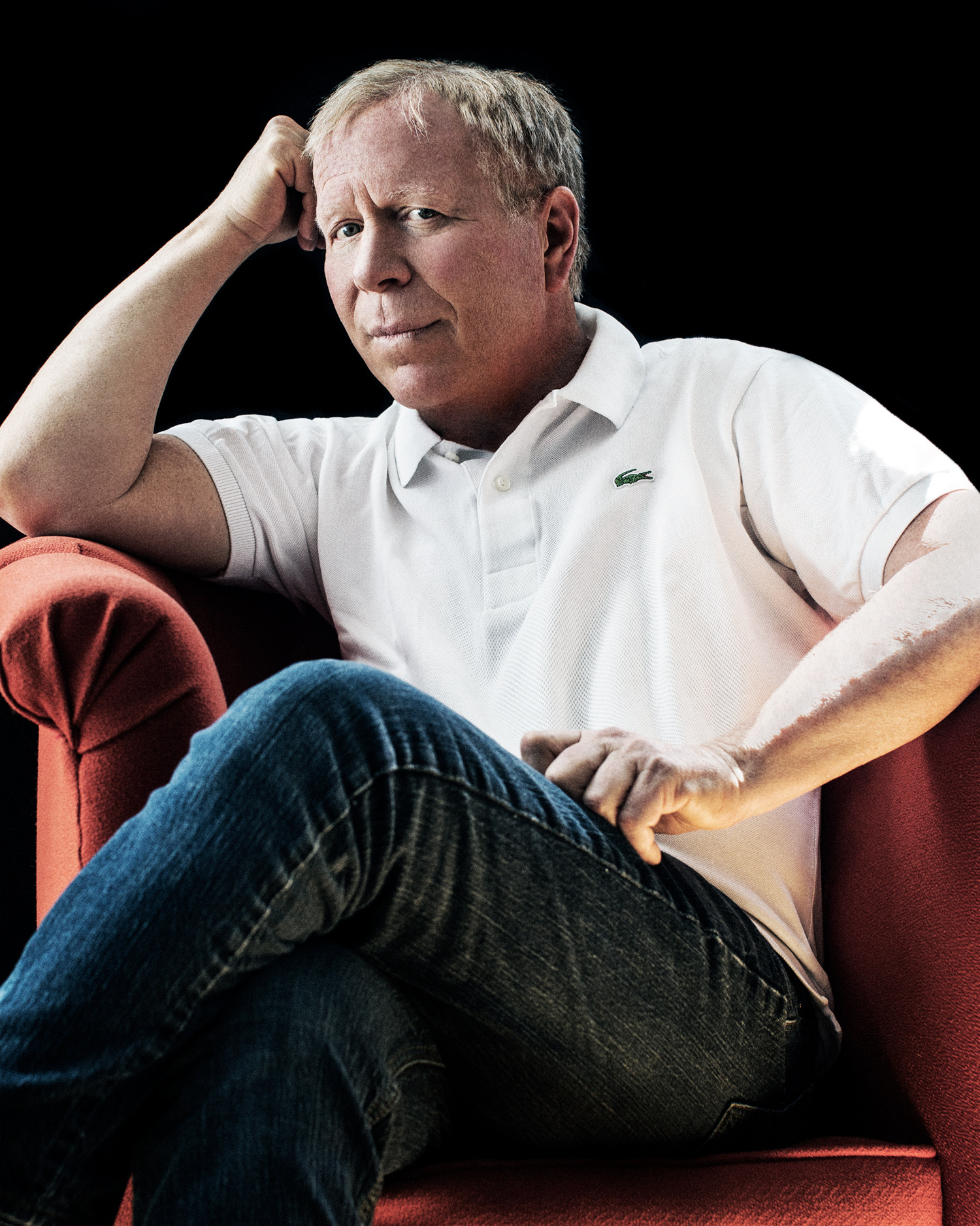
- Born: November 22, 1951; West Covina, California, U.S.
- Died: July 6, 2023 (aged 71); New York City, U.S.
- Education: University of California, Irvine (BA); Columbia University (MS)
- Occupations: Journalist; biographer
- Writing career
- Subjects: Popular culture

Stephen Meredith Silverman (November 22, 1951 – July 6, 2023) was an American biographer, journalist, and editor. He was chief entertainment correspondent for the New York Post from 1977 to 1988, and was a news editor at Time Inc. from 1995 to 2015, where he founded the People Online Daily. He is also the author of a dozen books of cultural criticism. The Wall Street Journal called him "a veteran journalist and historian of popular culture [who] writes with verve and mischief," while Kirkus Reviews dubbed him "a deft manipulator of the devastating deadpan non-sequitur".

== Early life and education ==
Stephen Meredith Silverman was born and raised in West Covina, California, a suburb of Los Angeles. He graduated in 1969 from West Covina High School, where he was editor of the school newspaper. His first job was selling ice cream in Disneyland.

Silverman received a Bachelor of Arts degree from the University of California, Irvine, and a Master of Science from the Columbia University Graduate School of Journalism.

== Career ==
=== Journalism ===
As a writer, critic, and editor, Silverman contributed to Esquire, Harper’s Bazaar, New York, The New York Times, the Chicago Tribune, Newsweek, The Times of London, Smithsonian, Vogue, The Wall Street Journal, and The Washington Post.

=== Writing ===
Silverman's first book, Public Spectacles, was a series of "mostly unvarnished and frequently amusing vignettes" of his personal run-ins with celebrity culture. His David Lean is a biography of the acclaimed director of Lawrence of Arabia and features an introduction by Katharine Hepburn. His Dancing on the Ceiling: Stanley Donen and His Movies, with an introduction by Audrey Hepburn, examines the life and career of the master director of such musicals as Singin' in the Rain and Funny Face. He has written numerous other books, including Macy’s Thanksgiving Day Parade: A New York City Holiday Tradition, a history of the annual parade showcasing "vintage prints from the Macy’s archives," The Catskills: Its History and How It Changed America, published by Alfred A. Knopf, and The Amusement Park: 900 Years of Thrills and Spills, and the Dreamers and Schemers Who Built Them, published by Black Dog & Leventhal Publishers. His last work, Sondheim: His Life, His Shows, His Legacy, was published posthumously on September 19, 2023, by Black Dog & Leventhal Publishers.

=== Television ===
For television, he wrote the TBS special Hot on the Trail: The Search for Sex, Love and Romance in the Old West.

=== Teaching ===
Silverman taught cultural affairs reporting and writing from 1995 to 2004 as an adjunct professor at the Columbia University Graduate School of Journalism in New York City.

== Personal life and death ==
Silverman lived in Manhattan. He died from kidney disease at a hospital there on July 6, 2023, at the age of 71.

== Books ==
- Public Spectacles (1981) about celebrity culture; ISBN 0-525-18605-0
- The Fox That Got Away: The Last Days of The Zanuck Dynasty at Twentieth Century-Fox (1988); ISBN 0-818-40485-X
- David Lean (1989); ISBN 0-810-92507-9
- Where There's a Will: Who Inherited What and Why (1991); ISBN 0-060-16260-0
- Dancing On the Ceiling: Stanley Donen and His Movies (1996); ISBN 0-679-41412-6
- The Last Remaining Seats: Movie Palaces of Tinseltown (1997); ISBN 0-964-31197-6
- Funny Ladies: 100 Years of Great Comediennes (1999); ISBN 0-810-93337-3
- Movie Mutts: Hollywood Goes to the Dogs (2001); ISBN 0-810-94394-8
- Envy, Anger and Sweet Revenge: Hey, It Works in Hollywood! (2002); ISBN 0-966-95735-0
- Divas! The Fabulous Photography of Kenn Duncan (2008); ASIN B-01F-9QNDK-S
- The Catskills: Its History and How It Changed America (2015); ASIN B-00T-CI48I-Q
- Macy’s Thanksgiving Day Parade: A New York City Holiday Tradition (2016); ISBN 0-789-33257-4
- The Amusement Park: 900 Years of Thrills and Spills, and the Dreamers and Schemers Who Built Them (2019); ISBN 0-316-41648-7
- ''Sondheim: His Life, His Shows, His Legacy (2023); ISBN 0-7624-8235-4
