= Gene Kelly filmography =

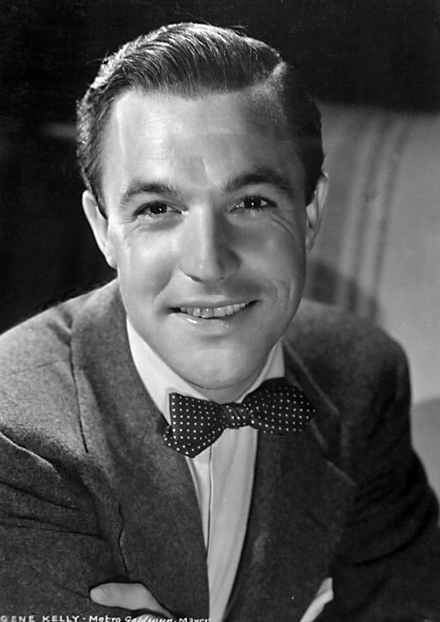
Kelly in 1943

Gene Kelly (1912–1996) was an American dancer, actor, singer, director, producer and choreographer whose work in motion pictures spans from 1942 to 1996. He is probably best known today for his performances in musicals, notably An American in Paris (1951) and Singin' in the Rain (1952).

Kelly made his Hollywood film debut in For Me and My Gal (1942), co-starring with Judy Garland. Afterward, he went on to work as an actor, dancer and subsequently, choreographer, in a series of musical films. In these films, his choreography included experiments with a combination of dance and animation (Anchors Aweigh and Invitation to the Dance) and dance scenes involving special effects (including the "Alter Ego" number from Cover Girl and the split-screen dance number from It's Always Fair Weather). In addition to his work as an actor and choreographer, Kelly directed or co-directed several films, some of which did not feature him in an acting role. Kelly appeared in several non-musical dramatic and comedy films as well.

Kelly received an Academy Award nomination for Best Actor for his performance in Anchors Aweigh (1945) and won an Honorary Academy Award for his work in An American in Paris (1951). He was voted the 15th most popular film actor on the American Film Institute’s millennium list, while Singin' in the Rain was voted the most popular movie musical of all time. This filmography below contains a chronological listing of Gene Kelly's feature films. His musicals are indicated with a beamed eighth note symbol (♫).

== Filmography ==
Year	Title	Functioned as				Notes Kelly's musical numbers	Ref
Year	Title	Director	Actor	Choreographer	Role	Notes Kelly's musical numbers	Ref
1942	For Me and My Gal ^{♫}	No	Yes	Yes	Harry Palmer	Co-choreographer "When You Wore a Tulip", "Ballin' the Jack", "Tramp Dance", "Frenchie, Frenchie"	
1943	Pilot #5	No	Yes	No	Vito S. Alessandro		
1943	DuBarry Was a Lady ^{♫}	No	Yes	Yes	Alec Howe / The Black Arrow	Co-choreographer "Do I Love You, Do I", "Friendship"	
1943	Thousands Cheer ^{♫}	No	Yes	Yes	Private Eddie Marsh	Co-choreographer "Let Me Call You Sweetheart"	
1943	The Cross of Lorraine	No	Yes	No	Victor		
1944	Cover Girl ^{♫}	No	Yes	Yes	Danny McGuire	Co-choreographer "The Show Must Go On", "Long Ago (and Far Away)", "Alter Ego"	
1944	Christmas Holiday	No	Yes	No	Robert Manette		
1945	Anchors Aweigh ^{♫}	No	Yes	Yes	GM2 Joseph Brady	Co-choreographer "The Mexican Hat Dance", "The Worry Song" (w/Tom and Jerry), "La Cumparsita!"	
1945	Combat Fatigue Irritability	No	Yes	No	Seaman Bob Lucas	Short military training film	
1946	Ziegfeld Follies ^{♫}	No	Yes	Yes	Himself	Co-choreographer "The Babbit and the Bromide"	
1947	Living in a Big Way ^{♫}	No	Yes	Yes	Leo Gogarty	Co-choreographer "It Had to Be You", "Fido and Me", dance on half-completed apartment house	
1948	The Pirate ^{♫}	No	Yes	Yes	Serafin	Co-choreographer "Be a Clown", "The Pirate Ballet", Niña"	
1948	The Three Musketeers	No	Yes	Yes	d'Artagnan	Co-choreographer of action sequences	
1948	Words and Music ^{♫}	No	Yes	Yes	Himself	"Slaughter on 10th Avenue"	
1949	Take Me Out to the Ball Game ^{♫}	No	Yes	Yes	Eddie O'Brien	Co-choreographer "Take Me Out to the Ball Game", "The Hat My Father Wore on St. Patrick's Day", "O'Brien to Ryan to Goldberg", "Yes, Indeedy", "Strictly U.S.A."	
1949	On the Town ^{♫}	Yes	Yes	Yes	Gabey	Co-choreographed and co-directed by Stanley Donen "New York, New York", "We're Going on the Town", "Prehistoric Man", "Main Street", "Count on Me", "A Day in New York", "That's All There is Folks"	
1950	Black Hand	No	Yes	No	Giovanni E. "Johnny" Columbo		
1950	Summer Stock ^{♫}	No	Yes	Yes	Joe D. Ross	Co-choreographer "Dig-Dig-Dig-Dig for Your Supper", "You, Wonderful You" (dance with newspaper), "All for You", "Hillbilly Heaven" (plus Garland number "Get Happy")	
1951	An American in Paris ^{♫}	No	Yes	Yes	Jerry Mulligan	Co-choreographer "Tra-La-La", "By Strauss", "I Got Rhythm", "'S Wonderful", "Our Love Is Here to Stay", "An American in Paris ballet"	
1951	It's a Big Country	No	Yes	No	Icarus Xenophon		
1952	Love Is Better Than Ever	No	Yes	No	Himself (unbilled cameo)		
1952	Singin' in the Rain ^{♫}	Yes	Yes	Yes	Don Lockwood	Co-choreographed and co-directed by Stanley Donen "Singin' in the Rain", "Fit as a Fiddle", "Good Mornin'", "You Were Meant For Me", "Broadway Ballet" (plus O'Connor number: "Make 'Em Laugh")	
1952	The Devil Makes Three	No	Yes	No	Capt. Jeff Eliot		
1954	Brigadoon ^{♫}	No	Yes	Yes	Tommy Albright	Co-choreographer "The Heather on the Hill", "Almost Like Being in Love", "The Chase", "From This Day On"	
1954	Seagulls Over Sorrento (US release title: Crest Of The Wave)	No	Yes	No	Lt. "Brad" Bradville (USN)	Filmed in the United Kingdom	
1954	Deep in My Heart ^{♫}	No	Yes	Yes	Himself	Co-choreographer "Dancing Around"	
1955	It's Always Fair Weather ^{♫}	Yes	Yes	Yes	Ted Riley	Co-choreographed and co-directed by Stanley Donen "The Time Has Come For Parting" (dance with trash can lids), "Once Upon a Time", "I Like Myself"	
1956	Invitation to the Dance ^{♫}	Yes	Yes	Yes	The Clown / The Marine / Sinbad	"Circus", "Ring Around the Rosie", "Sinbad the Sailor"	
1957	The Happy Road	Yes	Yes	No	Michael J. Andrews		
1957	Les Girls ^{♫}	No	Yes	Yes	Barry Nichols	Co-choreographer "Les Girls", "Ça c'est l'amour", "The Rope Dance", "Why Am I So Gone About That Girl", "You're Just Too, Too"	
1958	Marjorie Morningstar	No	Yes	No	Noel Airman		
1958	The Tunnel of Love	Yes	No	No			
1960	Inherit the Wind	No	Yes	No	E. K. Hornbeck		
1960	Let's Make Love	No	Yes	Yes	Himself (cameo)	Co-choreographer	
1960	Gigot	Yes	No	No			
1964	What a Way to Go!	No	Yes	Yes	Pinky Benson	Co-choreographer "Musical Extravaganza"	
1967	The Young Girls of Rochefort ^{♫}	No	Yes	Yes	Andy Miller	Choreographer	
1967	A Guide for the Married Man	Yes	No	No			
1969	Hello, Dolly! ^{♫}	Yes	No	No			
1970	The Cheyenne Social Club	Yes	No	No			
1973	40 Carats	No	Yes	No	Billy Boylan		
1974	That's Entertainment! ^{♫}	No	Yes	Yes	Himself (co-host)	Co-choreographer	
1976	That's Entertainment, Part II ^{♫}	Yes	Yes	Yes	Himself (co-host)	Co-choreographer and director of new sequences "That's Entertainment"	
1977	Viva Knievel!	No	Yes	No	Will Atkins		
1980	Xanadu ^{♫}	No	Yes	Yes	Danny McGuire	Co-choreographer	
1985	That's Dancing! ^{♫}	No	Yes	No	Himself (co-host)		
1994	That's Entertainment! III ^{♫}	No	Yes	No	Himself (co-host)		
1997	Cats Don't Dance	No	No	Yes		"Dedicated to our friend and collaborator, Gene Kelly"	

- Choreography credits per Billman.

== Bibliography ==
- Billman, Larry (1997). Film Choreographers and Dance Directors. North Carolina: McFarland and Company. ISBN 0-89950-868-5.
- Eames, John Douglas (1982). The MGM Story. New York, NY: Crown. ISBN 978-0517019924.
- Thomas, Tony (1991). The Films of Gene Kelly: Song and Dance Man. Secaucus, NJ: Kensington Books. ISBN 0-8065-0543-5.
