= That's Entertainment, Part II =

1976 film directed by Gene Kelly

- Directed by: Gene Kelly
- Written by: Leonard Gershe (narration)
- Produced by: Saul Chaplin; Daniel Melnick
- Starring: Fred Astaire; Gene Kelly
- Edited by: Bud Friegen; David Blewitt; David Bretherton; Peter C. Johnson
- Music by: Nelson Riddle
- Production company: Metro-Goldwyn-Mayer
- Distributed by: United Artists (United States/Canada); Cinema International Corporation (International)
- Release dates: May 10, 1976 (Premiere); May 16, 1976
- Running time: 126 minutes
- Country: United States
- Language: English

That's Entertainment, Part II is a 1976 American compilation film released by Metro-Goldwyn-Mayer and a sequel to That's Entertainment! (1974). Like the previous film, That's Entertainment, Part II was a retrospective of famous films released by MGM from the 1930s to the 1950s. Some posters for the film use Part 2 rather than Part II in the title.

For this second documentary, archivists featured more obscure musical numbers from MGM's vaults, and also featured tributes to some of the studio's best known comedy teams such as the Marx Brothers and Laurel and Hardy, romantic teams such as Spencer Tracy and Katharine Hepburn, and a montage of iconic stars such as Greta Garbo, Clark Gable, Mickey Rooney, John Barrymore, Wallace Beery, Joan Crawford, Jean Harlow, James Stewart and Lana Turner.

Gene Kelly and Fred Astaire hosted the film and Kelly directed the introductory segments featuring him and Astaire, which included location footage of Kelly returning to Paris, the city featured in two of MGM's most famous productions, An American in Paris and Gigi. This was the last film Kelly directed. Former top MGM cinematographer George Folsey returned to film the sequences.

Several new musical numbers featured Astaire and Kelly, including a couple of routines in which they danced together for the first time since the 1945 film Ziegfeld Follies, and for only the second time in their careers. It was the last time the 76-year-old Astaire danced in a film, though the veteran actor continued to make film and TV appearances until 1981; Kelly would last appear in the 1980 musical film Xanadu. According to film historian Robert Osborne, in specially-filmed introductions produced for Turner Classic Movies, it was Astaire who suggested to Kelly that the two take advantage of this potentially last-in-a-lifetime opportunity to perform together, something Kelly actually wishes for out loud during his narration of the first That's Entertainment! film. Howard Dietz and Saul Chaplin provided special lyrics for the film. Nelson Riddle provided the score for the film and also re-scored parts of it.

The opening title sequence was designed by Saul Bass, and pays homage to the range and style of title sequences produced between the 1930s and early 1950s. Hanna-Barbera provided new animation for the film.

Some 18 years later, it was followed by That's Entertainment! III, with Kelly once again appearing.

== Appearances ==
- Abbott & Costello
- Eddie 'Rochester' Anderson
- Louis Armstrong
- Lew Ayres
- John Barrymore
- Lionel Barrymore
- Wallace Beery
- Robert Benchley
- Constance Bennett
- Jack Benny
- Jack Buchanan
- James Cagney
- Sammy Cahn
- Louis Calhern
- Leslie Caron
- Gower Champion
- Marge Champion
- Cyd Charisse
- Maurice Chevalier
- Ronald Colman
- Jeanne Coyne
- Joan Crawford
- Bing Crosby
- Dan Dailey
- Doris Day
- Fifi D'Orsay
- Melvyn Douglas
- Tom Drake
- Marie Dressler
- Margaret Dumont
- Jimmy Durante
- Nelson Eddy
- Nanette Fabray
- W. C. Fields
- Bob Fosse
- Clark Gable
- Greta Garbo
- Judy Garland
- Betty Garrett
- Greer Garson
- Hermione Gingold
- Cary Grant
- Fernand Gravey
- Kathryn Grayson
- Carol Haney
- Oliver Hardy
- Jean Harlow
- Katharine Hepburn
- Judy Holliday
- Lena Horne
- Betty Hutton
- Allan Jones
- Buster Keaton
- Howard Keel
- Gene Kelly
- Grace Kelly
- June Knight
- Miliza Korjus
- Hedy Lamarr
- Stan Laurel
- Vivien Leigh
- Oscar Levant
- Myrna Loy
- Jeanette MacDonald
- The Marx Brothers
- Roddy McDowall
- Ann Miller
- Robert Montgomery
- Donald O'Connor
- Maureen O'Sullivan
- Walter Pidgeon
- Eleanor Powell
- William Powell
- Tommy Rall
- Debbie Reynolds
- Ginger Rogers
- Mickey Rooney
- Al Shean
- Dinah Shore
- Frank Sinatra
- Red Skelton
- Ann Sothern
- James Stewart
- Lewis Stone
- Elizabeth Taylor
- Robert Taylor
- Franchot Tone
- Spencer Tracy
- Lana Turner
- Bobby Van
- Gwen Verdon
- Ethel Waters
- David Wayne
- Johnny Weissmuller
- Esther Williams
- Keenan Wynn
- Robert Young
- Billie Burke
- Cliff Edwards

== Films shown ==
- The Broadway Melody (1929)
- The Songwriters' Revue (1930)
- Blondie of the Follies (1932)
- Grand Hotel (1932)
- Red Dust (1932)
- Tarzan the Ape Man (1932)
- Bombshell (1933)
- Dancing Lady (1933)
- Going Hollywood (1933)
- Hollywood Party (1934)
- The Merry Widow (1934)
- David Copperfield (1935)
- Broadway Melody of 1936 (1935)
- A Night at the Opera (1935)
- A Tale of Two Cities (1935)
- Mutiny on the Bounty (1935)
- Born to Dance (1936)
- San Francisco (1936)
- A Day at the Races (1937)
- The Good Earth (1937)
- Boys Town (1938)
- Listen, Darling (1938)
- The Great Waltz (1938)
- Broadway Serenade (1939)
- Goodbye, Mr. Chips (1939)
- Ninotchka (1939)
- Gone with the Wind (1939)
- New Moon (1940)
- Boom Town (1940)
- The Philadelphia Story (1940)
- Lady Be Good (1941)
- Two-Faced Woman (1941)
- Ziegfeld Girl (1941)
- White Cargo (1942)
- For Me and My Gal (1942)
- Woman of the Year (1942)
- Keeper of the Flame (1942)
- Cabin in the Sky (1943)
- Girl Crazy (1943)
- Two Girls and a Sailor (1944)
- Meet Me in St. Louis (1944)
- Without Love (1945)
- Abbott and Costello in Hollywood (1945)
- Anchors Aweigh (1945)
- Ziegfeld Follies (1946)
- Till the Clouds Roll By (1946)
- It Happened in Brooklyn (1947)
- The Sea of Grass (1947)
- The Pirate (1948)
- Easter Parade (1948)
- Words and Music (1948)
- Take Me Out to the Ball Game (1949)
- The Barkleys of Broadway (1949)
- Adam's Rib (1949)
- Annie Get Your Gun (1950)
- Three Little Words (1950)
- An American in Paris (1951)
- The Belle of New York (1952)
- Ivanhoe (1952)
- Singin' in the Rain (1952)
- Lovely to Look At (1952)
- Pat and Mike (1952)
- The Merry Widow (1952)
- Million Dollar Mermaid (1952)
- Lili (1953)
- Small Town Girl (1953)
- The Band Wagon (1953)
- Easy to Love (1953)
- Kiss Me, Kate (1953)
- Seven Brides for Seven Brothers (1954)
- Love Me or Leave Me (1955)
- It's Always Fair Weather (1955)
- The Tender Trap (1955)
- Invitation to the Dance (1956)
- High Society (1956)
- Silk Stockings (1957)
- Gigi (1958)
- Some Came Running (1958)
- Never So Few (1959)
- Billy Rose's Jumbo (1962)

== Musical numbers ==
- "That's Entertainment!" - Fred Astaire, Nanette Fabray, Oscar Levant, and Jack Buchanan from The Band Wagon segueing into Astaire and Gene Kelly (1953)
- "For Me and My Gal" - Judy Garland and Gene Kelly from For Me and My Gal (1942)
- "Fascinatin' Rhythm" - Eleanor Powell and Ensemble from Lady Be Good (1941)
- "I've Got a Feelin' You're Foolin'" - Robert Taylor and June Knight from Broadway Melody of 1936 (1935)
- "Chica Choca" - Greta Garbo from Two-Faced Woman (1941)
- "I Wanna Be a Dancin' Man" - Fred Astaire from The Belle of New York (1952)
- "Hi-Lili, Hi-Lo" - Leslie Caron and Mel Ferrer from Lili (1953)
- "Be a Clown" - Gene Kelly and Judy Garland from The Pirate (1948)
- "From This Moment On" - Tommy Rall, Ann Miller, Bob Fosse, Bobby Van, Carol Haney, and Jeanne Coyne from Kiss Me Kate (1953)
- "All of You" - Fred Astaire and Cyd Charisse from Silk Stockings (1957)
- "The Lady Is a Tramp" - Lena Horne from Words and Music (1948)
- "Smoke Gets in Your Eyes" - Kathryn Grayson, Marge Champion, and Gower Champion from Lovely to Look At (1952)
- "Easter Parade" - Judy Garland and Fred Astaire from Easter Parade (1948)
- "Temptation" - Bing Crosby from Going Hollywood (1933)
- "Zing! Went the Strings of My Heart" - Judy Garland from Listen, Darling (1938)
- "Taking a Chance on Love" - Ethel Waters from Cabin in the Sky (1943)
- "Swingin' the Jinx Away" - Eleanor Powell and Ensemble from Born to Dance (1936)
- "Stout Hearted Men/Lover, Come Back to Me" - Nelson Eddy and Jeanette MacDonald from New Moon (1940)
- "Inka Dinka Doo" - Jimmy Durante from Two Girls and a Sailor (1944)
- "I Got Rhythm" - Judy Garland, Mickey Rooney, and Ensemble from Girl Crazy (1943)
- "The Wedding of the Painted Doll" - Arthur Freed, Nacio Herb Brown, and Ensemble (introduced by Jack Benny) from The Songwriters Revue (1930) and The Broadway Melody (1929)
- "Oh, Lady Be Good!" - Ann Sothern and Robert Young from Lady Be Good (1941)
- "Broadway Serenade (For Every Lonely Heart)" - Jeanette MacDonald and Ensemble from Broadway Serenade (1939)
- "Manhattan" - Mickey Rooney from Words and Music (1948)
- "Three Little Words" - Fred Astaire and Red Skelton from Three Little Words (1950)
- "Tales from the Vienna Woods" - Fernand Gravey and Miliza Korjus from The Great Waltz (1938)
- "Good Morning" - Gene Kelly, Donald O'Connor, and Debbie Reynolds from Singin' in the Rain (1952)
- "Triplets" - Fred Astaire, Nanette Fabray, and Jack Buchanan from The Band Wagon (1953)
- "Have Yourself a Merry Little Christmas" - Judy Garland from Meet Me in St. Louis (1944)
- "Steppin' Out with My Baby" - Fred Astaire from Easter Parade (1948)
- "Ten Cents a Dance" - Doris Day from Love Me or Leave Me (1955)
- "I Got Rhythm" - Gene Kelly from An American in Paris (1951)
- "(Love Is) The Tender Trap" - Frank Sinatra from The Tender Trap (1955)
- "I'll Walk Alone" - Frank Sinatra at the Paramount Theater ca. 1944
- "Ol' Man River" - Frank Sinatra from Till the Clouds Roll By (1946)
- "I Fall in Love Too Easily" - Frank Sinatra from Anchors Aweigh (1945)
- "I Believe" - Frank Sinatra and Jimmy Durante from It Happened in Brooklyn (1947)
- "You're Sensational" - Frank Sinatra from High Society (1956)
- "I Begged Her" - Frank Sinatra and Gene Kelly from Anchors Aweigh (1945)
- "Maxim's/Girls Girls Girls" - Maurice Chevalier from The Merry Widow (1934)
- "The Last Time I Saw Paris" - Dinah Shore from Till the Clouds Roll By (1946)
- "Love Is Here to Stay" - Gene Kelly and Leslie Caron from An American in Paris (1951)
- "I'll Build a Stairway to Paradise" - Georges Guétary from An American in Paris (1951)
- "Can-Can" - Gwen Verdon and Ensemble from The Merry Widow (1952)
- "The Merry Widow Waltz" - Ensemble from The Merry Widow (1934)
- "Sinbad the Sailor" - Gene Kelly from Invitation to the Dance (1956)
- "Now You Has Jazz" - Bing Crosby and Louis Armstrong from High Society (1956)
- "A Couple of Swells" - Judy Garland and Fred Astaire from Easter Parade (1948)
- "Take Me to Broadway" - Bobby Van and Ensemble from Small Town Girl (1953)
- "Broadway Melody Ballet" - Gene Kelly, Cyd Charisse, and Ensemble from Singin' in the Rain (1952)
- "There's No Business Like Show Business" - Betty Hutton, Howard Keel, Louis Calhern, and Keenan Wynn from Annie Get Your Gun (1950)
- "I Like Myself" - Gene Kelly from It's Always Fair Weather (1955)
- "I Remember It Well" - Maurice Chevalier and Hermione Gingold from Gigi (1958)
- "Bouncin' the Blues" - Fred Astaire and Ginger Rogers from The Barkleys of Broadway (1949)
- "Cypress Gardens Water Spectacular" - Esther Williams from Easy to Love (1953)
- Finale - Fred Astaire and Gene Kelly

== Release ==
The film had its premiere at the Ziegfeld Theatre in New York City on May 10, 1976 as the annual fund raising gala for the Film Society of Lincoln Center. The film opened the Cannes Film Festival on May 13, 1976 before opening in London and Hollywood.

== Reception ==
The sequel received more critical acclaim, but was not as successful at the box-office as the first film. A.D. Murphy in Variety called it "a knockout." Elizabeth Taylor was quoted as feeling exploited by MGM in the sequel, appearing in the advertisements for the film but only appearing in the film for a few seconds.

== See also ==
- List of American films of 1976
