= In Gay Madrid =

1930 film by Robert Z. Leonard

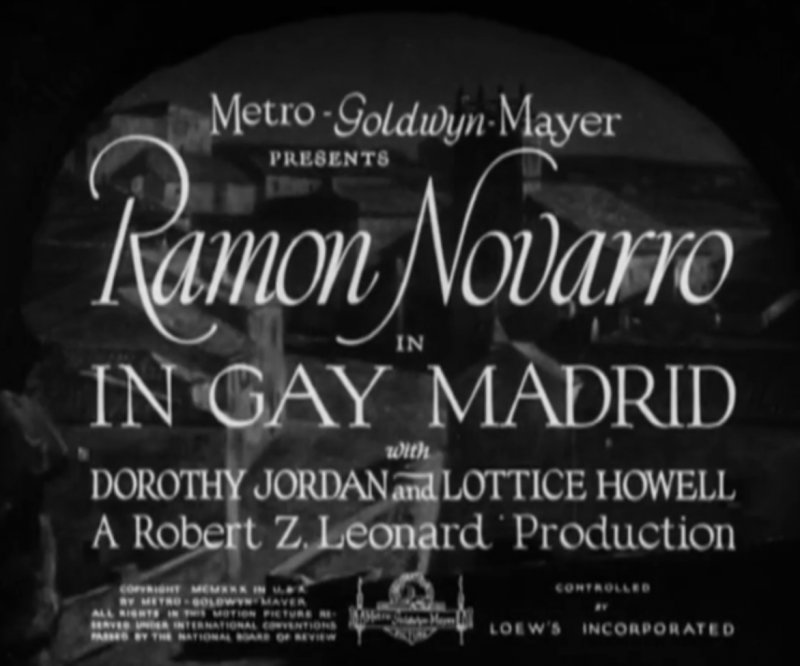
- Directed by: Robert Z. Leonard
- Written by: Bess Meredyth; Salisbury Field; Edwin Justus Mayer
- Based on: a novel by Alejandro Pérez Lugín
- Produced by: Robert Z. Leonard
- Starring: Ramón Novarro; Dorothy Jordan; Lottice Howell; Claude King; Eugenie Besserer; William V. Mong; Beryl Mercer
- Cinematography: Oliver T. Marsh
- Edited by: William S. Gray
- Music by: Xavier Cugat; Fred Ahlert; Herbert Stothart
- Production company: Metro-Goldwyn-Mayer
- Distributed by: Metro-Goldwyn-Mayer
- Release date: May 17, 1930
- Running time: 82 minutes
- Country: United States
- Language: English

In Gay Madrid is a 1930 American pre-Code musical comedy film directed by Robert Z. Leonard and starring Ramón Novarro, Dorothy Jordan, and Lottice Howell. It was released by Metro-Goldwyn-Mayer on May 17, 1930.

== Plot ==
A carefree Madrid law student named Ricardo is sent to a rural school in Santiago in hopes of curbing his playboy lifestyle. There, he continues flirting, serenading, and ultimately courting his guardian’s daughter, Carmina—until his former lover Goyita arrives and complicates everything.

== Cast ==
- Ramón Novarro as Ricardo
- Dorothy Jordan as Carmina Rivas
- Lottice Howell as Goytia
- Claude King as Marques de Castelar
- Eugenie Besserer as Dona Generosa
- William V. Mong as Rivas
- Beryl Mercer as Dona Concha
- Nanci Price as Jacinta
- Herbert Clark as Octavio
- David Scott as Ernesto
- George Chandler as Enrique
- Bruce Coleman as Corpulento
- Nicholas Caruso as Carlos

== Songs ==
The film features two songs by Fred E Ahlert and Roy Turk ('Smile While We May' and 'Into My Heart'), and two by Clifford Grey, Herbert Stothart and Xavier Cugat ('Santiago' and 'Dark Night'). All are sung by Ramon Novarro. A fifth song is performed at the start of the film by Lottice Howell. Its title is not certain, but is probably 'Let Me Give You Love,' by Ahlert and Turk.

== Production ==
Under the working title The House of Troy, filming of In Gay Madrid began on November 14, 1929 and concluded on December 21. Some retakes were directed by Robert Ober in January 1930.

== Release ==
In Gay Madrid was released on May 17, 1930, and was moderately successful at the box office. though it was critically panned. The film's financial under-performance could, in part, be attributed to American audiences growing tired of musicals. It was paired with the comedy short, The Home Edition, starring Jay C. Flippen, in some U.S. theaters. It was released in Ottawa on June 23, 1930, along with the short Memories, a Musical Fantasy. In Gay Madrid has had a DVD release from Warner Archive in November 2015.
