= Harry Palmer (actor) =

American vaudeville actor

Harry Palmer (c.1889-1962) was a vaudeville actor in the 1910s who was the inspiration for the musical film For Me and My Gal.

Palmer was born in Chicago, Illinois in 1889. He grew up always wanted to act, and in 1909, at the age of 20, he made his vaudeville debut at the Palace Theater in Chicago. Just a few years later, Palmer rose to stardom, acting in comedies and musicals by himself, until late 1916 when he teamed up with Joanne 'Jo' Hayden. Their act, "Palmer & Hayden", stayed together until they retired from show business in the 1920s. In mid-1917, the two became engaged.

In September 1917, Hayden's good friend Danny Metcalf, who was supposed to finish medical school, was drafted into the U.S. Army, and was killed in action in World War I on September 29 of that year. Shortly after, Palmer was also drafted into the Army, just before he and Hayden were going to play at The Palace in New York City. Palmer did not want to go to war and purposely damaged his hand so he would not have to go to France. Hayden was going to leave Palmer if he did not serve, so Palmer tried enlisting, but none of the armed services would accept him because of his hand. However, Palmer was accepted to the Red Cross ambulance corps and went overseas in early 1918. Hayden did not leave him or stop the engagement. Palmer saw action in France at Cantigny, the second Battle of Marne, Soissons, Saint-Mihiel and the Meuse-Argonne. Palmer was shot in the shoulder, but survived the war and was discharged from service in 1919.

Palmer and Hayden returned to vaudeville in 1919, and also got married that same year, but did not do many shows afterward. They retired from vaudeville in the early 1920s.

In 1942, Gene Kelly and Judy Garland player Palmer and Hayden in the MGM musical film For Me and My Gal, directed by Busby Berkeley. The story of the film closely followed the actual events surrounding Palmer's involvement in the First World War, although some details were changed for dramatic purposes, such as making "Danny" Hayden's brother dying in the war instead of a friend. Danny's last name was also used for the character "Jimmy Metcalf", the rival for Hayden's affections.

Harry Palmer died in 1962, at the age of 73.
