= The Julie Andrews Show =

1965 television special

The Julie Andrews Show is a television special that was broadcast by NBC in November 1965. Julie Andrews' guests included Gene Kelly and The New Christy Minstrels.
