= That's Entertainment! =

1974 American film by Jack Haley Jr.

- Directed by: Jack Haley Jr.
- Written by: Jack Haley Jr.
- Produced by: Jack Haley Jr.
- Starring: Frank Sinatra; Fred Astaire; Bing Crosby; Gene Kelly; Debbie Reynolds; Elizabeth Taylor; James Stewart; Peter Lawford; Liza Minnelli
- Cinematography: Russell Metty
- Edited by: Bud Friedgen
- Music by: Henry Mancini
- Production company: Metro-Goldwyn-Mayer
- Distributed by: United Artists (United States/Canada); Cinema International Corporation (International)
- Release date: May 17, 1974 (Los Angeles)
- Running time: 134 minutes
- Country: United States
- Language: English
- Budget: $3.2 million
- Box office: $19.1 million

That's Entertainment! is a 1974 American compilation film released by Metro-Goldwyn-Mayer to celebrate the studio's 50th anniversary. The success of the retrospective prompted a 1976 sequel, the related 1985 film That's Dancing!, and a third installment in 1994. MCA Records released a soundtrack of the music in the film in 1974.

== Background ==
Compiled by its writer-producer-director, Jack Haley Jr., under the supervision of executive producer Daniel Melnick, the film turned the spotlight on MGM's legacy of musical films from the 1920s through the 1950s, culling dozens of performances from the studio's movies and featuring archival footage of Judy Garland, Eleanor Powell, Lena Horne, Esther Williams, Ann Miller, Kathryn Grayson, Howard Keel, Jeanette MacDonald, Nelson Eddy, Cyd Charisse, June Allyson, Clark Gable, Mario Lanza, William Warfield, and many others.

Various segments were hosted by a succession of the studio's legendary stars: Frank Sinatra, Gene Kelly, Fred Astaire, Peter Lawford, Debbie Reynolds, Bing Crosby, James Stewart, Elizabeth Taylor, Mickey Rooney, Donald O'Connor, and Liza Minnelli, representing her mother Judy Garland. Minnelli and Haley began dating during production of the film and were soon married, a union which lasted five years.

The host segments for That's Entertainment! constitute some of the final footage to be captured on the famous MGM backlot, which appears severely dilapidated in 1973 because MGM had sold the property to developers and the sets were about to be demolished. Several of the hosts, including Bing Crosby, remark on the backlot's crumbling conditions during their segments; the most notable deterioration can be seen when Fred Astaire revisits the ruins of the train station set that had been used in several films including the opening of The Band Wagon 20 years earlier, and when Peter Lawford revisits exteriors used in his 1947 musical Good News. In his autobiography Life is Too Short published in 1991, Mickey Rooney stated that his host segment for That's Entertainment! was filmed on the backlot in one day and he was paid $385, the Screen Actors Guild minimum wage for a day's work at the time.

The title of the film derives from the anthemic song "That's Entertainment!" by Arthur Schwartz and Howard Dietz, introduced in the 1953 musical The Band Wagon. The film title is usually expressed with an exclamation mark, but in some contexts, the punctuation is dropped, as in the movie poster.

== Musical numbers ==
- "Singin' in the Rain" Prologue -
  - sung by Cliff Edwards with dancing by Chorus Line; from The Hollywood Revue of 1929 (1929)
  - sung by Jimmy Durante; from Speak Easily (1932)
  - Judy Garland; from Little Nellie Kelly (1940)
  - the main title sequence from Singin' in the Rain (1952) sung by Gene Kelly, Debbie Reynolds, Donald O'Connor
- "The Broadway Melody" - Charles King and Chorus Girls; from The Broadway Melody (1929)
- "Rosalie" - sung by Chorus with dancing by Eleanor Powell; from Rosalie (1937)
- "Indian Love Call" - sung by Nelson Eddy and Jeanette MacDonald; from Rose-Marie (1936)
- "A Pretty Girl Is Like a Melody" - from The Great Ziegfeld (1936)
  - sung by Allan Jones (lip-synched by Dennis Morgan) and Ziegfeld Girls
- "Begin the Beguine" - dancing by Fred Astaire and Eleanor Powell; from Broadway Melody of 1940 (1940)
- "The Song's Gotta Come from the Heart" - danced and sung by Frank Sinatra and Jimmy Durante; from It Happened in Brooklyn (1947)
- "The Melody of Spring" - sung by Elizabeth Taylor; from Cynthia (1947)
- "Honeysuckle Rose" - Lena Horne; from Thousands Cheer (1943)
- "Take Me Out to the Ball Game" - Gene Kelly and Frank Sinatra; from Take Me Out to the Ball Game (1949)
- "Thou Swell" - June Allyson with Pete Roberts and Eugene Cox (Lip-synced by Ramon Blackburn and Royce Blackburn); from Words and Music (1948)
- "The Varsity Drag" - dancing by June Allyson, Peter Lawford, and Chorus Line; from Good News (1947)
- "Aba Daba Honeymoon" - (sung by) Debbie Reynolds and Carleton Carpenter; from Two Weeks with Love (1950)
- "It's a Most Unusual Day" - from A Date with Judy (1948)
  - sung by Jean McLaren (Lip-synced by Elizabeth Taylor)
  - sung by Jane Powell with Wallace Beery, Scotty Beckett, George Cleveland, Leon Ames, Carmen Miranda, Selena Royle, Robert Stack, Elizabeth Taylor and Jerry Hunter featuring the Xavier Cugat Orchestra
- "On the Atchison, Topeka and the Santa Fe" - Ray Bolger, Judy Garland, Marjorie Main, Ben Carter, Virginia O'Brien, Cyd Charisse, and Ensemble; from The Harvey Girls (1946)
- "It Must Be You" - dancing by a dance chorus; sung by Robert Montgomery and Lottice Howell; from Free and Easy (1930)
- "Got a Feelin' for You" - dancing by Joan Crawford; sung by Joan Crawford and Chorus (introduced by Conrad Nagel); from The Hollywood Revue of 1929 (1929)
- "Reckless" - dancing by Jean Harlow, Rafael Alcayde, and Chorus; sung by Virginia Verrill (lip-synced by Jean Harlow) from Reckless (1935)
- "Did I Remember" - sung by Virginia Verrill (lip-synced by Jean Harlow) and Cary Grant from Suzy (1936)
- "Easy to Love" - sung by Marjorie Lane (lip-synced by Eleanor Powell) and James Stewart; from Born to Dance (1936)
- "Puttin' on the Ritz" - Clark Gable and Ensemble; from Idiot's Delight (1939)
- "Dear Mr. Gable (You Made Me Love You)" - Judy Garland from Broadway Melody of 1938 (1937)
- "Babes in Arms" - Mickey Rooney, Judy Garland, Douglas McPhail, Betty Jaynes, and Chorus; from Babes in Arms (1939)
- "Hoe Down" - dancing by Mickey Rooney, Judy Garland, and Ensemble; from Babes on Broadway (1941)
- "Do the La Conga" - MGM Studio Orchestra; from Strike Up the Band (1940)
- "Waitin' for the Robert E. Lee" - dancing by Chorus; sung by Mickey Rooney and Judy Garland
- "Babes On Broadway" - dancing by Mickey Rooney and Judy Garland; sung by Mickey Rooney, Judy Garland, Virginia Weidler, and Richard Quine; from Babes on Broadway (1941)
- "Strike Up the Band" - sung by Mickey Rooney, Judy Garland, and Chorus; from Strike Up the Band (1940)
- "The Babbitt and the Bromide" - dancing by Gene Kelly and Fred Astaire; from Ziegfeld Follies (1946)
- "They Can't Take That Away from Me" - dancing by Fred Astaire and Ginger Rogers; sung by Fred Astaire; from The Barkleys of Broadway (1949)
- "Heigh Ho the Gang's All Here" and "Let’s Go Bavarian" - danced and sung by Fred Astaire, Joan Crawford, and Chorus; from Dancing Lady (1933)
- "I Guess I'll Have to Change My Plan" - danced and sung by Fred Astaire and Jack Buchanan; from The Band Wagon (1953)
- "Sunday Jumps" - dancing by Fred Astaire; from Royal Wedding (1951)
- "Shoes with Wings On" - dancing by Fred Astaire; from The Barkleys of Broadway (1949)
- "You're All the World to Me" - danced by Fred Astaire; from Royal Wedding (1951)
- "Dancing in the Dark" - dancing by Fred Astaire and Cyd Charisse; from The Band Wagon (1953)
- Esther Williams Montage:
  - "Pagan Love Song" - sung by Chorus; from Pagan Love Song (1950)
  - "You and You" (aka "Du und Du, Op. 367") - from Bathing Beauty (1944)
  - "Viennese Blood" (aka "Wiener Blut, Op. 354")
  - also includes water ballets from Million Dollar Mermaid (1952)
- "I Wanna Be Loved by You" - sung by Helen Kane (lip-synced by Debbie Reynolds) and Carleton Carpenter; from Three Little Words (1950)
- "I Gotta Hear That Beat" - danced and sung by Ann Miller; from Small Town Girl (1953)
- "Be My Love" - sung by Kathryn Grayson and Mario Lanza; from The Toast of New Orleans (1950)
- "Make 'Em Laugh" - sung by Donald O'Connor; from Singin' in the Rain (1952)
- "Cotton Blossom" - sung by Chorus
- "Make Believe" - sung by Kathryn Grayson and Howard Keel
- "Ol' Man River" - sung by William Warfield and Chorus; from Show Boat (1951)
- "By Myself" - Fred Astaire from The Band Wagon (1953)
- "Be a Clown" - dancing by Gene Kelly & The Nicholas Brothers; sung by Gene Kelly; from The Pirate (1948)
- "The Children's Dance" - Gene Kelly; from Living in a Big Way (1947)
- "The Pirate Ballet" - dancing by Gene Kelly; from The Pirate (1948)
- "La Cumparsita" - Gene Kelly; in Anchors Aweigh (1945)
- "New York, New York" - danced and sung by Gene Kelly, Frank Sinatra, and Jules Munshin; from On the Town (1949)
- "The Worry Song" - dancing by Gene Kelly and Jerry Mouse; sung by Gene Kelly & Sara Berner; from Anchors Aweigh (1945)
- "Broadway Melody Ballet" - Gene Kelly and Ensemble; from Singin' in the Rain (1952)
- "In the Good Old Summertime" - sung by Chorus; from In the Good Old Summertime (1949)
- "La Cucaracha" - The Garland Sisters; from La Fiesta de Santa Barbara (1935)
- "Waltz with a Swing" - Judy Garland; from Every Sunday (1936)
- "Americana" - Judy Garland and Deanna Durbin; from Every Sunday (1936)
- "Your Broadway and My Broadway" - dancing Judy Garland, Buddy Ebsen, Eleanor Powell, and George Murphy; from Broadway Melody of 1938 (1937)
- "You're Off to See the Wizard" - The Munchkins; from The Wizard of Oz (1939)
- "If I Only Had the Nerve" - Judy Garland, Bert Lahr, Ray Bolger, Jack Haley and Buddy Ebsen
- "We're Off to See the Wizard" - Judy Garland, Bert Lahr, Ray Bolger and Jack Haley and Buddy Ebsen
- "Over the Rainbow" - Judy Garland; from The Wizard of Oz (1939)
- "But Not for Me" - Judy Garland from Girl Crazy (1943)
- "The Trolley Song" - sung by Judy Garland and Chorus
- "Under the Bamboo Tree" - danced and sung by Judy Garland and Margaret O'Brien
- "The Boy Next Door" - sung by Judy Garland; from Meet Me in St. Louis (1944)
- "Get Happy" - Judy Garland & Chorus; from Summer Stock (1950)
- "Going Hollywood" - Bing Crosby and Ensemble; from Going Hollywood (1933)
- "Well, Did You Evah" - Bing Crosby and Frank Sinatra; from High Society (1956)
- "True Love" - Bing Crosby and Grace Kelly; from High Society (1956)
- "Hallelujah" - sung by Kay Armen, Ann Miller, Jane Powell, Debbie Reynolds, Vic Damone, Russ Tamblyn, Tony Martin, and Chorus; from Hit the Deck (1955)
- "Barnraising Dance (Bless Your Beautiful Hide)" - dancing by various characters; from Seven Brides for Seven Brothers (1954)
- "Gigi" - sung by Louis Jourdan
- "Thank Heaven for Little Girls" - sung by Maurice Chevalier and Chorus; from Gigi (1958)
- "An American in Paris Ballet" - dancing by Gene Kelly, Leslie Caron, and Ensemble; from An American in Paris (1951)

== Charts ==
The soundtrack was released by MGM (2624012).

Chart (1974)	Position
Australia (Kent Music Report)	55

== Appearances ==
- June Allyson
- Leon Ames
- Kay Armen
- Edward Arnold (uncredited)
- Fred Astaire
- Ethel Barrymore (uncredited)
- Lionel Barrymore (uncredited)
- Scotty Beckett
- Wallace Beery (uncredited)
- Ray Bolger
- Joe E. Brown
- Virginia Bruce
- Jack Buchanan
- Billie Burke
- Leslie Caron
- Carleton Carpenter
- Cyd Charisse
- George Cleveland
- Maurice Chevalier
- Joan Crawford
- Bing Crosby
- Xavier Cugat
- Jacques d'Amboise
- Arlene Dahl (uncredited)
- Virginia Dale
- Lili Damita (uncredited)
- Vic Damone
- Gloria DeHaven (uncredited)
- Tom Drake
- Jimmy Durante
- Deanna Durbin
- Buddy Ebsen
- Nelson Eddy
- Cliff Edwards
- Vera-Ellen
- Errol Flynn (uncredited)
- Clark Gable
- Greta Garbo
- Ava Gardner
- Judy Garland
- Betty Garrett (uncredited)
- Greer Garson (uncredited)
- Hermione Gingold (uncredited)
- Cary Grant
- Kathryn Grayson
- Virginia Grey
- Jack Haley
- Jean Harlow
- Bernadene Hayes
- Van Heflin (uncredited)
- Katharine Hepburn (uncredited)
- Lena Horne
- Lottice Howell
- Claude Jarman Jr. (uncredited)
- Betty Jaynes
- Van Johnson
- Allan Jones
- Jennifer Jones (uncredited)
- Louis Jourdan
- Buster Keaton (uncredited)
- Howard Keel
- Gene Kelly
- Charles King
- Lorraine Krueger
- Bert Lahr
- Fernando Lamas
- Angela Lansbury (uncredited)
- Mario Lanza
- Peter Lawford
- Ruta Lee
- Janet Leigh
- Vivien Leigh
- Jeanette MacDonald
- Marjorie Main
- Joan Marsh
- Tony Martin
- Douglas McPhail
- Ann Miller
- Sidney Miller
- Liza Minnelli
- Carmen Miranda (uncredited)
- Ricardo Montalbán
- Robert Montgomery
- Agnes Moorehead (uncredited)
- Natalie Moorhead
- Dennis Morgan
- Frank Morgan (uncredited)
- Jules Munshin
- Conrad Nagel (uncredited)
- J. Carrol Naish (uncredited)
- Julie Newmar
- The Nicholas Brothers
- Margaret O'Brien
- Virginia O'Brien
- Donald O'Connor
- Reginald Owen (uncredited)
- Walter Pidgeon (uncredited)
- Marc Platt
- Paul Porcasi
- Eleanor Powell
- Jane Powell
- June Preisser
- Richard Quine
- Tommy Rall
- Debbie Reynolds
- Jeff Richards
- Ginger Rogers
- Mickey Rooney
- Selena Royle (uncredited)
- Norma Shearer (uncredited)
- Frank Sinatra
- Red Skelton (uncredited)
- Robert Stack
- James Stewart
- Paula Stone
- Russ Tamblyn
- Elizabeth Taylor
- Sidney Toler (uncredited)
- Audrey Totter (uncredited)
- Spencer Tracy (uncredited)
- Lana Turner
- William Warfield
- Virginia Weidler
- Esther Williams
- Robert Young (uncredited)

Notes

- Clips of Howard Keel (as Hazard Endicott) are from the 1950 film Pagan Love Song.
- Clips of Agnes Moorehead (as Parthy Hawks) are from the 1951 film Show Boat.

== Release ==
The film premiered at the Loew's Beverly Theater in Beverly Hills on the evening of May 17, 1974. MGM billed it as their greatest premiere in a quarter century. There was a red carpet from the Loew's Beverly Theater to the Beverly Wilshire Hotel for the post-screening dinner and dancing. Also promoted were the 100 movie stars in attendance. Anyone paying $100 per seat for the dinner could sit at a table with a movie star. The premiere also featured several live introductions to the various on-screen segments; it was co-hosted by Sammy Davis Jr. and Liza Minnelli and featured live stage appearances by Debbie Reynolds, Frank Sinatra, Gene Kelly, Elizabeth Taylor, and others. The premiere, as an event and a party, was a dazzling success. However, as a publicity event for MGM, it was completely overshadowed; the expected press were all across town covering the breaking news of the Symbionese Liberation Army shootout that night. The film had its New York premiere on May 23 and opened the following day at the Ziegfeld Theatre. The film opened nationwide in June 1974.

== Reception ==
The film grossed $25,600 in its first week in Los Angeles and did even better the following week with $45,000. Over the 4-day Memorial Day weekend at the Ziegfeld it grossed $71,164. The film was United Artists' highest-grossing film of the year. Adjusted for inflation, the film has grossed $19.1 million worldwide.

== Sequels ==
Despite statements made in the original theatrical trailer and promotional materials that such a production would never be repeated, That's Entertainment! is one of the few documentaries to spawn official sequels.

That's Entertainment, Part II was released in 1976. The use of multiple hosts was dropped for this production, instead Fred Astaire and Gene Kelly returned to co-host the retrospective, which expanded beyond musicals to pay tribute to MGM's dramatic and comedy stars as well. The sequel would turn out to be the last time Astaire and Kelly danced together on film.

That's Dancing! was released in 1985. Unlike the two prior That's Entertainment! films, this documentary was not limited exclusively to MGM productions. The film is closely related to the That's Entertainment! series, with shared studio and producers credits, but also since its opening credits contain a card with the title That's Entertainment! III (not to be confused with the subsequent 1994 film).

That's Entertainment! III was released in 1994. The film featured more archival footage, with a distinct focus on previously unreleased (or rarely seen) material cut from the MGM films.

Gene Kelly is the only individual to host in all four films.

== Home media ==
All three That's Entertainment! films were released to DVD in 2004. The box set collection of the films included a bonus DVD that included additional musical numbers that had been cut from MGM films as well as the first release of the complete performance of "Mr. Monotony" by Judy Garland (the version used in That's Entertainment! III is truncated). That's Dancing! received a separate DVD release in 2007. The MGM trilogy also received a Blu-ray release in the late 2000s; the bonus content of the DVD box set was spread among the three films rather than presented as a standalone disc. In January 2023, the film was added to MGM+ to celebrate the network and streaming platform's rebranding from Epix; Judy Garland's recording of the titular song would also serve as the music for the rebrand's promotional trailer released at that time concurrently. It has since been removed from the service.

== See also ==
- List of American films of 1974
