= That's Entertainment! III =

- Original theatrical poster
- Directed by: Bud Friedgen; Michael J. Sheridan
- Written by: Bud Friedgen; Michael J. Sheridan
- Produced by: Bud Friedgen; Michael J. Sheridan; Peter Fitzgerald (executive)
- Starring: June Allyson; Cyd Charisse; Lena Horne; Howard Keel; Gene Kelly; Ann Miller; Debbie Reynolds; Mickey Rooney; Esther Williams
- Music by: Marc Shaiman
- Production companies: Metro-Goldwyn-Mayer; Turner Entertainment Co.
- Distributed by: MGM/UA Distribution Co. (United States); United International Pictures (International)
- Release date: July 6, 1994
- Running time: 113 min. (DVD version)
- Language: English

That's Entertainment! III is a 1994 American compilation film released by Metro-Goldwyn-Mayer to celebrate the studio's 70th anniversary. Unlike the prior retrospectives That's Entertainment! (1974) and That's Entertainment, Part II (1976), the third installment "focuses on outtakes, unfinished numbers and behind-the-scenes glimpses of the old musicals."

Hosts for the film were Gene Kelly (in his last film appearance), June Allyson, Cyd Charisse, Lena Horne, Howard Keel, Ann Miller, Debbie Reynolds, Mickey Rooney, and Esther Williams, making her first appearance in a theatrical film in more than 30 years. That's Entertainment! III had a limited theatrical release in 1994. According to film historian Robert Osborne, writing for The Hollywood Reporter at the time, the film did "pleasant business" at New York's Ziegfeld Theatre.

== Reception ==
Writing in The New York Times, film critic Caryn James called the film "a lively and funny compilation of curiosities suggesting what might have been." James wrote that the "one real problem" with the film was that many of the clips were very short. "Because these excerpts are so much weaker than the glorious musical numbers, excerpted at greater length in the first "That's Entertainment!," it makes some sense to cut them drastically. But over the course of a two-hour film, the effect is jarring, like stop-and-go driving in heavy traffic."

Critic Roger Ebert gave the film three and a half stars. He praised its focus on musical numbers that did not appear on screen due to any number of factors, including "commerce, taste, race, sex and running time." He called it "a genuinely fascinating film, one that may tell more about MGM musicals, and aspects of American society, than a film devoted to still more highlights from musical numbers that did make their way into films."

== Home media ==
All three films were released to DVD on October 12, 2004. The box set collection of the films included a bonus DVD that included additional musical numbers that had been cut from MGM films as well as the first release of the complete performance of "Mr. Monotony" by Judy Garland (the version used in That's Entertainment! III is truncated). The home video version of That's Entertainment! III also contains several musical numbers not seen in the theatrical release. The film was later remastered for high-definition release on Blu-ray and HD DVD on December 18, 2007.

== See also ==
- List of American films of 1994
