= Jeanne Coyne =

American Broadway dancer, choreographer and actress

- Born: February 28, 1923; Pittsburgh, Pennsylvania, U.S.
- Died: May 10, 1973 (aged 50); Los Angeles, California, U.S.
- Resting place: Holy Cross Cemetery; 33.99241°N 118.388857°W
- Occupations: Stage actress, dancer, choreographer
- Years active: 1949–1959
- Spouses: Stanley Donen (m. 1948; div. 1951); Gene Kelly (m. 1960)
- Children: 2

Jeanne Coyne (February 28, 1923 – May 10, 1973) was an American Broadway dancer, choreographer and actress.

== Biography ==
With Carol Haney (1924 – 1964), Coyne assisted directors Stanley Donen and Gene Kelly, both of whom she married. She appeared as a dancer in the MGM films Words and Music, On the Town, Summer Stock, Singin' in the Rain and Kiss Me Kate.

She was married to Donen from 1948 to 1951, and Kelly from 1960 to 1973. She and Kelly had two children, Timothy and Bridget.

She died on May 10, 1973, in Los Angeles, California, from leukemia, at the age of 50.

== Filmography ==
Year	Title	Role	Notes
1948	Words and Music	Showgirl	Uncredited
1949	On the Town	Dancer in 'Day in New York' Ballet	Uncredited
1950	Summer Stock	Stock Company Member	Uncredited
1952	Singin' in the Rain	Chorus Girl	Uncredited
1953	Kiss Me Kate	Specialty Dancer #2	(final film role)
