= Lottice Howell =

American actress (1897–1982)

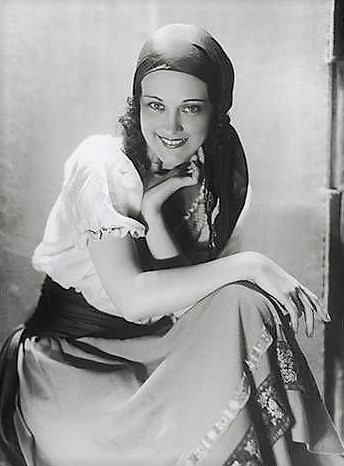
- Howell in a publicity photo
- Born: November 14, 1897; Bowling Green, Kentucky
- Died: October 24, 1982 (aged 84)
- Education: Woman's College of Alabama
- Occupations: Singer actress
- Parent(s): Mr. and Mrs. J. E. Howell

Lottice Howell (November 14, 1897 – October 24, 1982) was an American coloratura soprano and actress best known for her singing of popular and semi-classical music.

== Early years ==
The daughter of Mr. and Mrs. J. E. Howell, she was born in Bowling Green, Kentucky, and raised in Moundville, Alabama. Her father was "a prominent lumber and cotton magnate". Howell graduated from Moundville Normal High School and the Woman's College of Alabama. Her interest in the stage began in college, where she acted in productions, and after graduating she taught voice there. She studied music in New York, but financial problems led her to teach in a school in Georgia before she could return to New York to seek a career on stage.

== Career ==
On July 10, 1921, Howell debuted at the Strand Theater in New York, singing as part of the stage show that preceded the day's film. In 1922–1923, she had the lead in a national touring company that performed Mozart's The Impresario.

On Broadway, Howell appeared as Mugette in Deep River (1926) and as Virginia Shrivell in Bye, Bye, Bonnie (1927). For a season, she was the prima donna in a production of My Maryland. In February 1929, she began performing in vaudeville. In October 1929, she signed a contract and began working with Metro-Goldwyn-Mayer film studio. Her film debut came in In Gay Madrid (1930). She also appeared in Free and Easy (1930). In the early 1930s, she performed at the London Palladium.

A dislike for the unproductive time spent in making films led Howell to return to vaudeville. In 1942, she left entertaining, returning to her home and her widowed mother. She soon learned how to raise crops and cattle on the family farm. Other than working with community projects, including the Red Cross, she lived a private life until her death in 1982.

== Recognition ==
In 1994, Howell was inducted posthumously into the Alabama Women's Hall of Fame.
