= Gene Kelly =

American entertainer (1912–1996)

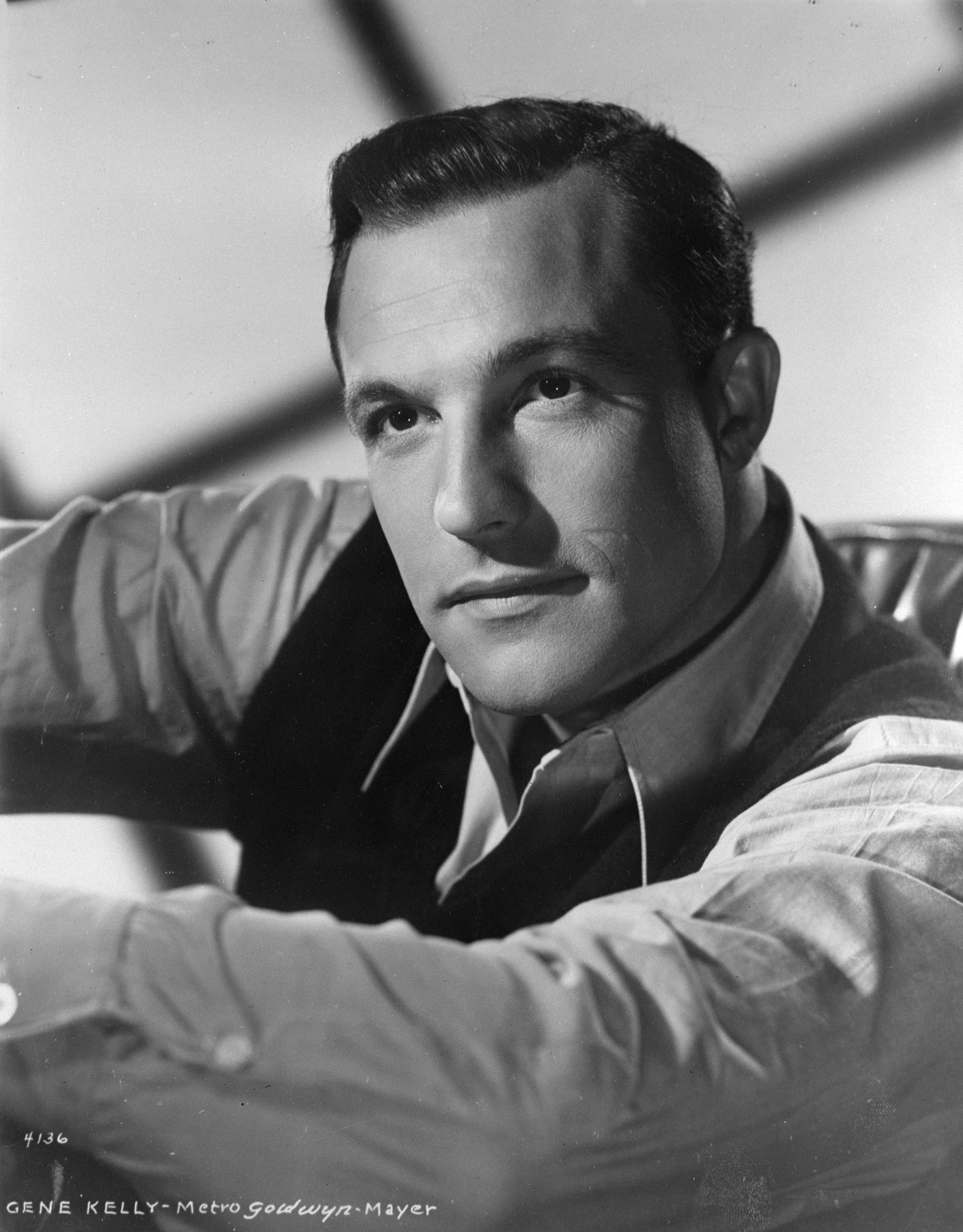
- Kelly c. 1946
- Born: Eugene Curran Kelly; August 23, 1912; Pittsburgh, Pennsylvania, U.S.
- Died: February 2, 1996 (aged 83); Beverly Hills, California, U.S.
- Citizenship: American (Irish citizenship granted late in life)
- Education: University of Pittsburgh
- Occupations: Dancer; actor; singer; director; choreographer
- Years active: 1931–1994
- Known for: Singin' in the Rain; An American in Paris; On the Town; Invitation to the Dance
- Political party: Democratic
- Spouses: Betsy Blair (m. 1941; div. 1957) Jeanne Coyne (m. 1960; died 1973) Patricia Ward (m. 1990)
- Children: 3

Eugene Curran Kelly (August 23, 1912 – February 2, 1996) was an American dancer, actor, singer, director and choreographer. He was known for his energetic and athletic dancing style. Kelly sought to create a new form of American dance accessible to the general public, which he called "dance for the common man". He starred in, choreographed, and, with Stanley Donen, co-directed some of the best-regarded musical films of the 1940s and 1950s.

Kelly is best known for his performances in An American in Paris (1951), which won the Academy Award for Best Picture and Singin' in the Rain (1952), which he and Donen directed and choreographed. He received a nomination for the Academy Award for Best Actor for his role as Joseph "Joe" Bradley" in Anchors Aweigh (1945). Kelly's director debut was On the Town (1949), which he co-directed with Donen and also played the lead role. Later in the 1950s, as musicals waned in popularity, he starred in Brigadoon (1954) and It's Always Fair Weather (1955), the last film he directed with Donen. His solo directorial debut was Invitation to the Dance (1956), one of the last MGM musicals, which was a commercial failure.

Kelly made his film debut in For Me and My Gal (1942) with Judy Garland, with whom he also appeared in The Pirate (1948) and Summer Stock (1950). He also appeared in the dramas Black Hand (1950) and Inherit the Wind (1960), for which he received critical praise.

He continued as a director in the 1960s, with his credits including A Guide for the Married Man (1967) and Hello, Dolly! (1969), which received an Oscar nomination for Best Picture. He co-hosted and appeared in Ziegfeld Follies (1946), That's Entertainment! (1974), That's Entertainment, Part II (1976), That's Dancing! (1985), and That's Entertainment, Part III (1994).

His innovations transformed the Hollywood musical, and he is credited with almost single-handedly making the ballet form commercially acceptable to film audiences. According to dance and art historian Beth Genné, working with his co-director Donen in Singin' in the Rain and in films with director Vincente Minnelli, "Kelly ... fundamentally affected the way movies are made and the way we look at them. And he did it with a dancer's eye and from a dancer's perspective." Kelly received an Academy Honorary Award in 1952 for his career achievements; the same year, An American in Paris won six Academy Awards, including Best Picture. He later received lifetime achievement awards in the Kennedy Center Honors (1982) and from the Screen Actors Guild and American Film Institute. In 1999, the American Film Institute also ranked him as the 15th greatest male screen legend of Classic Hollywood Cinema.

== Early life ==
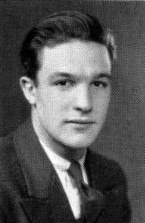
Kelly's senior picture from the 1933 yearbook of the University of Pittsburgh

Kelly was born in the East Liberty neighborhood of Pittsburgh. He was middle of five children of James Patrick Joseph Kelly, a phonograph salesman, and his wife, Harriet Catherine Curran. His father was born in Peterborough, Ontario to an Irish Canadian family. His maternal grandfather was an immigrant from Derry, Ireland, and his maternal grandmother was of German ancestry. When he was eight, Kelly's mother enrolled him and his brother James in dance classes, along with their sisters. As Kelly recalled, they both rebelled: "We didn't like it much and were continually involved in fistfights with the neighborhood boys who called us sissies ... I didn't dance again until I was 15." At one time, his childhood dream was to play shortstop for the hometown Pittsburgh Pirates.

By the time he decided to dance, he was an accomplished sportsman and able to defend himself. He attended St. Raphael Elementary School in the Morningside neighborhood of Pittsburgh and graduated from Peabody High School at age 16. He entered the Pennsylvania State College as a journalism major, but after the 1929 crash he left school and found work in order to help his family financially. He created dance routines with his younger brother Fred to earn prize money in local talent contests. They also performed in local nightclubs.

In 1931, Kelly enrolled at the University of Pittsburgh to study economics, joining the Theta Kappa Phi fraternity (later known as Phi Kappa Theta after merging with Phi Kappa). He became involved in the university's Cap and Gown Club, which staged original musical productions. After graduating in 1933, he continued to be active with the Cap and Gown Club, serving as the director from 1934 to 1938. Kelly was admitted to the University of Pittsburgh Law School.

His family opened a dance studio in the Squirrel Hill neighborhood of Pittsburgh. In 1932, they renamed it the Gene Kelly Studio of the Dance and opened a second location in Johnstown, Pennsylvania in 1933. Kelly served as a teacher at the studio during his undergraduate and law-student years at Pitt. In 1931, he was approached by the Beth Shalom Synagogue in Pittsburgh to teach dance, and to stage the annual Kermesse. The venture proved a success, Kelly being retained for seven years until his departure for New York.

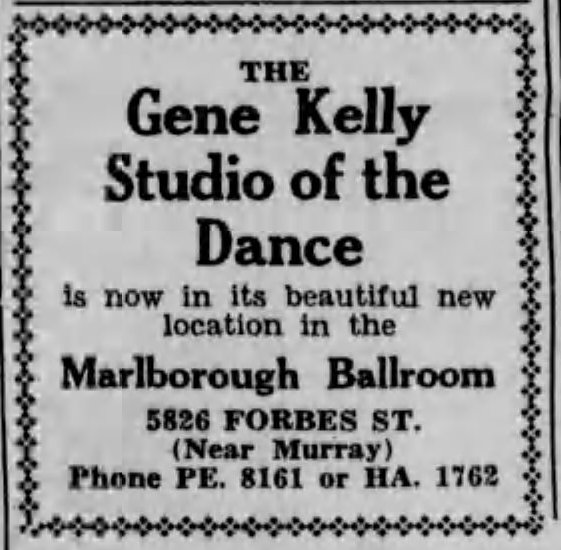
1935 advertisement for the Gene Kelly Studio of the Dance at a new location in Squirrel Hill

Kelly eventually decided to pursue a career as a dance teacher and full-time entertainer, so he dropped out of law school after two months. He increased his focus on performing and later said: "With time I became disenchanted with teaching because the ratio of girls to boys was more than ten to one, and once the girls reached 16, the dropout rate was very high." In 1937, having successfully managed and developed the family's dance-school business, he moved to New York City in search of work as a choreographer. Kelly returned to Pittsburgh, to his family home at 7514 Kensington Street, in 1940, and worked as a theatrical actor.

== Stage career ==
After a fruitless search for work in New York, Kelly returned to Pittsburgh to his first position as a choreographer with the Charles Gaynor musical revue Hold Your Hats at the Pittsburgh Playhouse in April 1938. Kelly appeared in six of the sketches, one of which, La cumparsita, became the basis of an extended Spanish number in the film Anchors Aweigh eight years later.

His first Broadway assignment, in November 1938, was as a dancer in Cole Porter's Leave It to Me!—as the American ambassador's secretary who supports Mary Martin while she sings "My Heart Belongs to Daddy". He had been hired by Robert Alton, who had staged a show at the Pittsburgh Playhouse where he was impressed by Kelly's teaching skills. When Alton moved on to choreograph the musical One for the Money, he hired Kelly to act, sing, and dance in eight routines. In 1939, he was selected for a musical revue, One for the Money, produced by the actress Katharine Cornell, who was known for finding and hiring talented young actors.

Kelly's first big breakthrough was in the Pulitzer Prize–winning The Time of Your Life, which opened on October 25, 1939—in which, for the first time on Broadway, he danced to his own choreography. In 1939, he received his first assignment as a Broadway choreographer, for Billy Rose's Diamond Horseshoe. He began dating a cast member, Betsy Blair, and they got married on October 16, 1941.

In 1940, he got the lead role in Rodgers and Hart's Pal Joey, again choreographed by Robert Alton. This role propelled him to stardom. During its run, he told reporters: "I don't believe in conformity to any school of dancing. I create what the drama and the music demand. While I am a hundred percent for ballet technique, I use only what I can adapt to my own use. I never let technique get in the way of mood or continuity." His colleagues at this time noticed his great commitment to rehearsal and hard work. Van Johnson—who also appeared in Pal Joey—recalled: "I watched him rehearsing, and it seemed to me that there was no possible room for improvement. Yet he wasn't satisfied. It was midnight and we had been rehearsing since 8 in the morning. I was making my way sleepily down the long flight of stairs when I heard staccato steps coming from the stage ... I could see just a single lamp burning. Under it, a figure was dancing ... Gene."

Offers from Hollywood began to arrive, but Kelly was in no hurry to leave New York. Eventually, he signed with David O. Selznick, agreeing to go to Hollywood at the end of his commitment to Pal Joey, in October 1941. Prior to his contract, he also managed to fit in choreographing the stage production of Best Foot Forward.

== Film career ==
=== 1941–1945: Becoming established in Hollywood ===
Gene Kelly dances with Jerry of Tom and Jerry in Anchors Aweigh (1945)

Selznick sold half of Kelly's contract to Metro-Goldwyn-Mayer for his first motion picture: For Me and My Gal (1942) starring Judy Garland. Kelly said he was "appalled at the sight of myself blown up 20 times. I had an awful feeling that I was a tremendous flop." For Me and My Gal performed very well, and in the face of much internal resistance, Arthur Freed of MGM picked up the other half of Kelly's contract. After appearing in a B movie drama, Pilot No. 5 (1943) and in Christmas Holiday (1944), he took the male lead in Cole Porter's Du Barry Was a Lady (1943) with Lucille Ball, in a part originally intended for Ann Sothern. His first opportunity to dance to his own choreography came in his next picture, Thousands Cheer (1943), in which he performed a mock-love dance with a mop. Unusually, in Pilot No. 5, Kelly played the antagonist.

In 1944 he achieved breakthrough as a dancer on film when MGM lent him to Columbia to dance with Rita Hayworth in Cover Girl, a film that foreshadowed the best of his future work. He created a memorable routine dancing to his own reflection. Despite this, critic Manny Farber was moved to praise Kelly's "attitude", "clarity", and "feeling" as an actor while inauspiciously concluding, "The two things he does least well—singing and dancing—are what he is given most consistently to do."

In Kelly's next film, Anchors Aweigh (1945), MGM gave him a free hand to devise a range of dance routines, including his duets with co-star Frank Sinatra and the celebrated animated dance with Jerry Mouse—the animation for which was supervised by William Hanna and Joseph Barbera. That performance was enough for Farber to completely reverse his previous assessment of Kelly's skills. Reviewing the film, Farber enthused, "Kelly is the most exciting dancer to appear in Hollywood movies." Anchors Aweigh became one of the most successful films of 1945 and Kelly was nominated for the Academy Award for Best Actor. In Ziegfeld Follies (1946)—which was produced in 1944 but delayed for release—Kelly collaborated with Fred Astaire, for whom he had the greatest admiration, in "The Babbitt and the Bromide" challenge dance routine.

==== Military service ====
Kelly was deferred from the draft in 1940 by the U.S. Selective Service System at the request of his employers, but was classified 1-A, eligible for induction, in October 1944 after an appeal to President Franklin Delano Roosevelt by the head of the Selective Service in New York City. Roosevelt personally upheld the appeal.

In November 1944, he was inducted into the armed forces, and at his request he was assigned to the U.S. Navy. He served in the U.S. Naval Air Service and was commissioned as lieutenant, junior grade. He was stationed in the Photographic Section, Washington, D.C., where he helped write and direct a range of documentaries – this stimulated his interest in the production side of filmmaking. He was discharged in 1946.

=== 1946–1952: MGM ===
After Kelly returned from Naval service, MGM had nothing planned and used him in a routine black-and-white movie: Living in a Big Way (1947). The film was considered so weak that the studio asked Kelly to design and insert a series of dance routines; they noticed his ability to carry out such assignments. This led to a lead part in his next picture, with Judy Garland and director Vincente Minnelli—a musical film version of S.N. Behrman's play, The Pirate (1948), with songs by Cole Porter. The Pirate gave full rein to Kelly's athleticism. It features Kelly's work with the Nicholas Brothers—the leading black dancers of their day—in a virtuoso dance routine. Now regarded as a classic, the film was ahead of its time, but flopped at the box office.

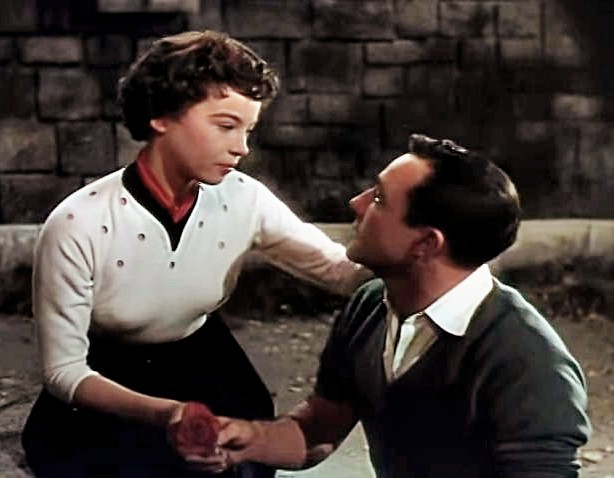
Leslie Caron and Kelly in the trailer for An American in Paris, 1951

MGM wanted Kelly to return to safer and more commercial vehicles, but he ceaselessly fought for an opportunity to direct his own musical film. In the interim, he capitalized on his swashbuckling image as d'Artagnan in The Three Musketeers in 1948—and appeared with Vera-Ellen in the Slaughter on Tenth Avenue ballet in Words and Music (1948 again). He was due to play the male lead opposite Garland in Easter Parade (1948), but broke his ankle playing volleyball. He withdrew from the film and persuaded Fred Astaire to come out of retirement to replace him.

In 1949 he starred in Take Me Out to the Ball Game, his second film with Sinatra, where Kelly paid tribute to his Irish heritage in "The Hat My Father Wore on St. Patrick's Day" routine. This musical film persuaded Arthur Freed to have Kelly make On the Town, also in 1949, in which he partnered with Frank Sinatra for the third and final time. A breakthrough in the musical film genre, it has been described as "the most inventive and effervescent musical thus far produced in Hollywood."

Stanley Donen, brought to Hollywood by Kelly to be his assistant choreographer, received co-director credit for On the Town. According to Kelly: "when you are involved in doing choreography for film, you must have expert assistants. I needed one to watch my performance, and one to work with the cameraman on the timing ... without such people as Stanley, Carol Haney, and Jeanne Coyne I could never have done these things. When we came to do On the Town, I knew it was time for Stanley to get screen credit because we weren't boss–assistant anymore but co-creators." Together, they opened up the musical form, taking the film musical out of the studio and into real locations, with Donen taking responsibility for the staging and Kelly handling the choreography. Kelly went much further than before in introducing modern ballet into his dance sequences, going so far in the "Day in New York" routine as to substitute four leading ballet specialists for Sinatra, Munshin, Garrett, and Miller.

Kelly asked the studio for a straight acting role, and he took the lead role in the early Mafia melodrama Black Hand (1950). This exposé of organized crime is set in New York's "Little Italy" during the late 19th century and focuses on the Black Hand, a group that extorts money upon threat of death. In the real-life incidents upon which this film is based, it was the Mafia, not the Black Hand, who functioned as the villain. Filmmakers had to tread gingerly whenever dealing with big-time crime, it being safer to go after a "dead" criminal organization than a "live" one. There followed Summer Stock (1950)—Garland's last musical film for MGM—in which Kelly performed the "You, You Wonderful You" solo routine with a newspaper and a squeaky floorboard. In his book Easy the Hard Way, Joe Pasternak, head of another of MGM's musical units, singled out Kelly for his patience and willingness to spend as much time as necessary to enable the ailing Garland to complete her part.

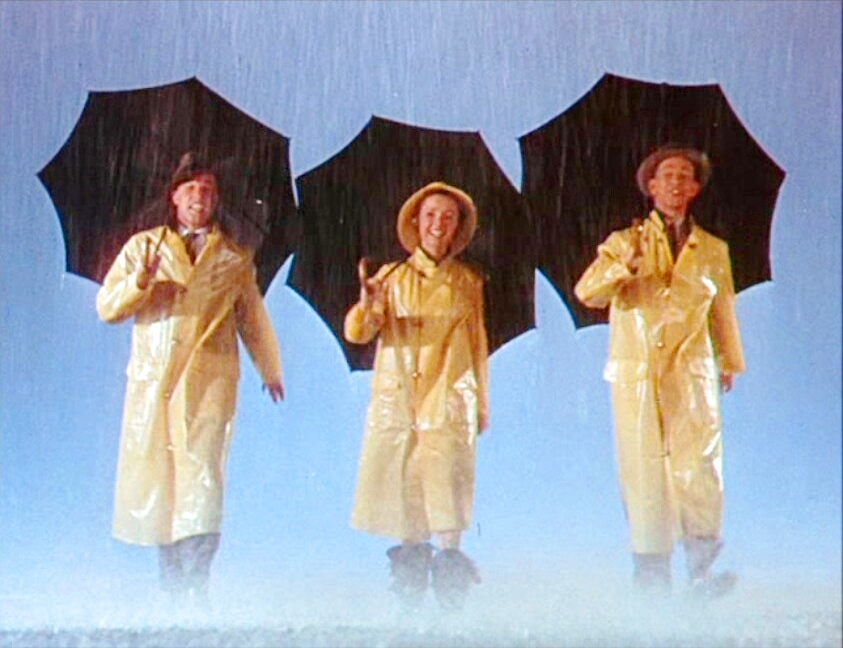
Singin' in the Rain trailer: Donald O'Connor, Debbie Reynolds and Kelly, 1952

Then followed in quick succession two musicals that secured Kelly's reputation as a major figure in the American musical film. First, An American in Paris (1951) and—probably the most admired of all film musicals—Singin' in the Rain (1952). As co-director, lead star, and choreographer, Kelly was the driving force in both of these films. Johnny Green, the head of music at MGM at the time, said of him,

Gene is easygoing as long as you know exactly what you are doing when you're working with him. He's a hard taskmaster and he loves hard work. If you want to play on his team you'd better like hard work, too. He isn't cruel, but he is tough, and if Gene believed in something, he didn't care who he was talking to, whether it was Louis B. Mayer or the gatekeeper. He wasn't awed by anybody, and he had a good record of getting what he wanted.

An American in Paris won six Academy Awards, including Best Picture. The film also marked the debut of 19-year-old ballerina Leslie Caron, whom Kelly had spotted in Paris and brought to Hollywood. Its dream ballet sequence, lasting an unprecedented 17 minutes, was the most expensive production number ever filmed at that time. Bosley Crowther described it as, "whoop-de-doo ... one of the finest ever put on the screen." Also in 1951, Kelly received an honorary Academy Award for his contribution to film musicals and the art of choreography.

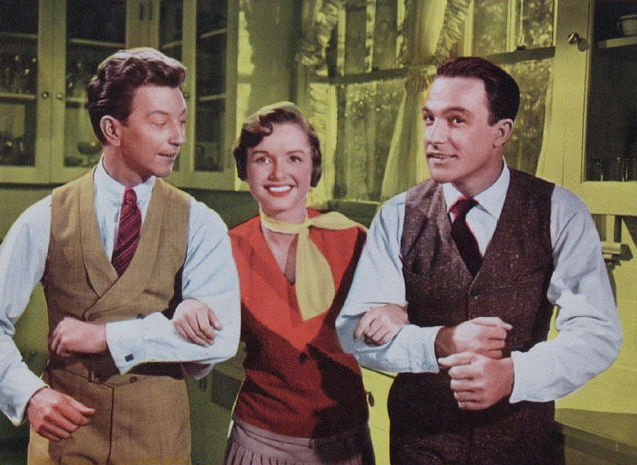
Donald O'Connor, Debbie Reynolds, and Gene Kelly from a lobby card for Singin' in the Rain

The following year, Singin' in the Rain featured Kelly's celebrated and much imitated solo dance routine to the title song, along with the "Moses Supposes" routine with Donald O'Connor and the "Broadway Melody" finale with Cyd Charisse. Though the film did not initially generate the same enthusiasm An American in Paris created, it has subsequently overtaken the earlier film to occupy its current pre-eminent place in the esteem of critics.

=== 1953–1957: Decline of Hollywood musicals ===
At the peak of his creative powers, Kelly made what in retrospect some see as a career mistake. In December 1951, he signed a contract with MGM that sent him to Europe for 19 months to use MGM funds frozen in Europe to make three pictures while personally benefiting from tax exemptions. Invitation to the Dance, a pet project of Kelly's to bring modern ballet to mainstream film audiences. It was beset with delays and technical problems, and flopped when finally released in 1956.

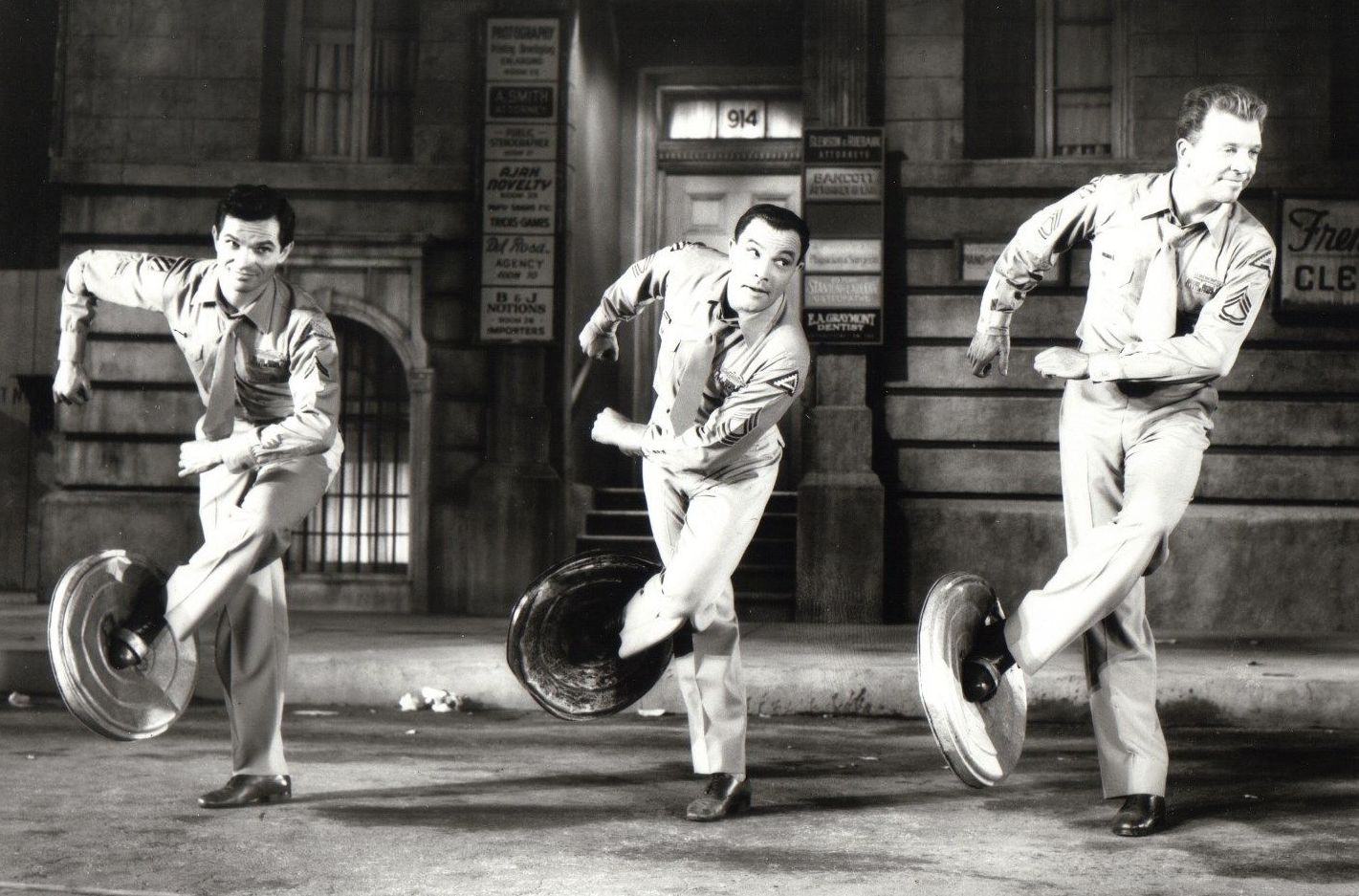
Michael Kidd, Kelly, and Dan Dailey in It's Always Fair Weather (1955), directed by Kelly and Stanley Donen, their last collaboration

When Kelly returned to Hollywood in 1953, the film musical was beginning to feel the pressures from television, and MGM cut the budget for his next picture Brigadoon (1954), with Cyd Charisse, forcing him to make the film on studio backlots instead of on location in Scotland. This year also had him appear as a guest star with his brother Fred in the "I Love to Go Swimmin' with Wimmen" routine in Deep in My Heart (1954).

MGM's refusal to lend him out for Guys and Dolls and Pal Joey put further strains on his relationship with the studio. He negotiated an exit to his contract that involved making three further pictures for MGM. The first of these, It's Always Fair Weather (1955), co-directed with Donen, was a musical satire on television and advertising, and includes his roller-skate dance routine to I Like Myself, and a dance trio with Michael Kidd and Dan Dailey that Kelly used to experiment with the widescreen possibilities of Cinemascope.

MGM had lost faith in Kelly's box-office appeal, and as a result It's Always Fair Weatherpremiered at 17 drive-in theaters around the Los Angeles metroplex, all double features with Bad Day at Black Rock. Next followed Kelly's last musical film for MGM, Les Girls (1957), in which he joined Mitzi Gaynor, Kay Kendall, and Taina Elg. The third picture he completed was a co-production between MGM and himself, a B-film, The Happy Road (1957), set in his beloved France, his first foray in a new role as producer-director-actor. After leaving MGM, Kelly returned to stage work.

=== 1958–1996: After MGM ===
In 1958, Kelly directed Rodgers and Hammerstein's musical play Flower Drum Song. Early in 1960, Kelly, an ardent Francophile and fluent French speaker, was invited by A. M. Julien, the general administrator of the Paris Opéra and Opéra-Comique, to select his own material and create a modern ballet for the company, the first time an American had received such an assignment. The result was Pas de Dieux, based on Greek mythology, combined with the music of George Gershwin's Concerto in F. It was a major success, and it led to his being honored with the Chevalier de la Légion d'Honneur by the French Government.

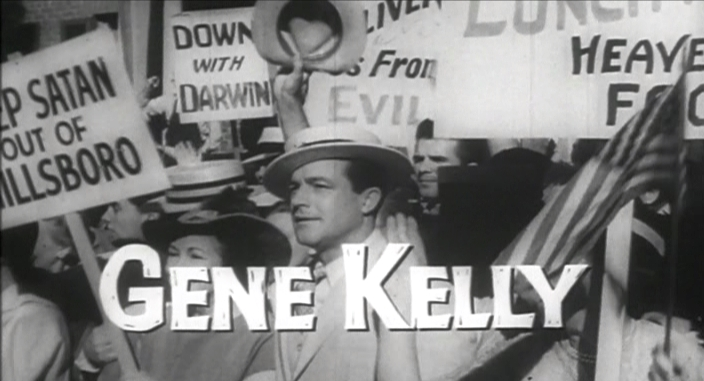
Kelly as Hornbeck in Inherit the Wind, 1960

In 1960, Kelly continued to make some film appearances, such as Hornbeck in the Hollywood production of Inherit the Wind and as himself in Let's Make Love. However, most of his efforts were now concentrated on film production and directing. In Paris, he directed Jackie Gleason in Gigot (1962), but the film was drastically recut by Seven Arts Productions and flopped. Another French effort, Jacques Demy's homage to the MGM musical, The Young Girls of Rochefort (Les Demoiselles de Rochefort, 1967), in which Kelly appeared, was a box-office success in France and nominated for Academy Awards for Best Music and Score of a Musical Picture (Original or Adaptation), but performed poorly elsewhere.

He was asked to direct the 1965 film version of The Sound of Music, which had already been turned down by Stanley Donen. He escorted Ernest Lehman, the screenwriter, out of his house, saying, "Go find someone else to direct this piece of shit."

His first foray into television was a documentary for NBC's Omnibus, Dancing is a Man's Game (1958), in which he assembled a group of America's greatest sportsmen—including Mickey Mantle, Sugar Ray Robinson, and Bob Cousy—and reinterpreted their moves choreographically, as part of his lifelong quest to remove the effeminate stereotype of the art of dance, while articulating the philosophy behind his dance style. It gained an Emmy nomination for choreography and now stands as the key document explaining Kelly's approach to modern dance.

Kelly appeared frequently on television shows during the 1960s, including Going My Way (1962–63), which was based on the 1944 film of the same name. It enjoyed great popularity in Roman Catholic countries outside the US. He also appeared in three major TV specials: The Julie Andrews Show (1965), New York, New York (1966), and Jack and the Beanstalk (1967)—a show he produced and directed that again combined cartoon animation and live dance, winning him an Emmy Award for Outstanding Children's Program.

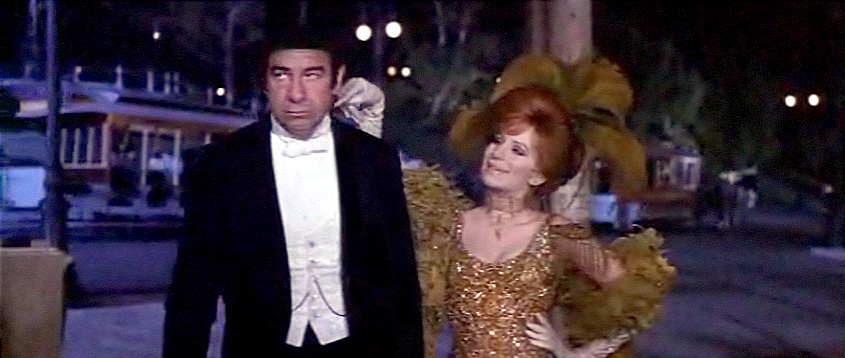
Walter Matthau with Barbra Streisand in Hello, Dolly!, 1969

In 1963, Kelly joined Universal Pictures for a two-year stint. He joined 20th Century Fox in 1965, but had little to do—partly due to his decision to decline assignments away from Los Angeles for family reasons. His perseverance finally paid off, with the major box-office hit A Guide for the Married Man (1967), in which he directed Walter Matthau. Then, a major opportunity arose when Fox—buoyed by the returns from The Sound of Music (1965)—commissioned Kelly to direct Hello, Dolly! (1969), again directing Matthau along with Barbra Streisand. The film was nominated for seven Academy Awards, winning three.

In 1966, Kelly starred in a musical television special for CBS titled Gene Kelly in New York, New York. The special focuses on Gene Kelly in a musical tour around Manhattan, dancing along such landmarks as Rockefeller Center, the Plaza Hotel, and the Museum of Modern Art, which serve as backdrops for the show's entertaining production numbers. The special was written by Woody Allen, who also stars alongside Kelly. Guest stars included choreographer Gower Champion, British musical comedy star Tommy Steele, and singer Damita Jo DeBlanc.

In 1970, he made another television special: Gene Kelly and 50 Girls, and was invited to bring the show to Las Vegas, which he did for an eight-week stint on the condition he be paid more than any artist had ever been paid there. He directed veteran actors James Stewart and Henry Fonda in the comedy Western The Cheyenne Social Club (1970), which performed poorly at the box office. In 1973, he worked again with Frank Sinatra as part of Sinatra's Emmy-nominated TV special, Magnavox Presents Frank Sinatra.

In 1974, he appeared as one of many special narrators in the dancing compilation film That's Entertainment! Kelly was then picked to direct and co-star in its 1976 follow-up That's Entertainment, Part II alongside longtime friend Fred Astaire. The film would mark the pair's last on-stage performance together, and Astaire's final dance number in the public eye at the age of 76.

Kelly was a guest on the 1975 television special starring Steve Lawrence and Eydie Gormé, "Our Love Is Here to Stay," appearing with his son, Tim, and daughter, Bridget. He starred in the poorly received action film Viva Knievel! (1977), with the then high-profile stuntman, Evel Knievel. Kelly continued to make frequent TV appearances. His final film role was in Xanadu (1980), a flop despite a popular soundtrack that spawned five Top 20 hits by the Electric Light Orchestra, Cliff Richard, and Kelly's co-star Olivia Newton-John. In Kelly's opinion, "The concept was marvelous, but it just didn't come off."

In 1980, he was invited by Francis Ford Coppola to recruit a production staff for American Zoetrope's One from the Heart (1982). Although Coppola's ambition was for him to establish a production unit to rival the Freed Unit at MGM, the film's failure put an end to this idea. In November 1983 he made his first Royal Variety Performance before Her Majesty Queen Elizabeth II, at London's Theatre Royal. Kelly served as executive producer and co-host of That's Dancing! (1985), a celebration of the history of dance in the American musical. Kelly's final on-screen appearance was to introduce That's Entertainment! III (1994). His final film project was the animated film Cats Don't Dance, not released until 1997, for which Kelly acted as an uncredited choreographic consultant. It was dedicated to his memory.

In 1993, Kelly was hired by Madonna and her brother Christopher Ciccone to do the choreography for part of Madonna's The Girlie Show tour, but he was quickly dismissed due to the very different visions that Kelly and the Ciccones had about the performers he was to direct and their dancing abilities.

== Working methods and influence on filmed dance ==
When he began his collaborative film work, he was influenced by Robert Alton and John Murray Anderson, striving to create moods and character insight with his dances. He choreographed his own movement, along with that of the ensemble, with the assistance of Jeanne Coyne, Stanley Donen, Carol Haney, and Alex Romero. He experimented with lighting, camera techniques, and special effects to achieve true integration of dance with film, and was one of the first to use split screens, double images, and live action with animation, and is credited as the person who made the ballet form commercially acceptable to film audiences.

A clear progression was evident in his development, from an early concentration on tap and musical comedy style to greater complexity using ballet and modern dance forms. Kelly himself refused to categorize his style: "I don't have a name for my style of dancing ... It's certainly hybrid ... I've borrowed from the modern dance, from the classical, and certainly from the American folk dance—tap-dancing, jitterbugging ... But I have tried to develop a style which is indigenous to the environment in which I was reared." He especially acknowledged the influence of George M. Cohan: "I have a lot of Cohan in me. It's an Irish quality, a jaw-jutting, up-on-the-toes cockiness—which is a good quality for a male dancer to have."

He was heavily influenced by an African-American dancer, Robert Dotson, whom he saw perform at Loew's Penn Theatre around 1929. He was briefly taught by Frank Harrington, an African-American tap specialist from New York. However, his main interest was in ballet, which he studied under Kotchetovsky in the early 1930s. Biographer Clive Hirschhorn writes: "As a child, he used to run for miles through parks and streets and woods—anywhere, just as long as he could feel the wind against his body and through his hair. Ballet gave him the same feeling of exhilaration, and in 1933, he was convinced it was the most satisfying form of self-expression."

He studied Spanish dancing under Angel Cansino, Rita Hayworth's uncle. Generally speaking, he tended to use tap and other popular dance idioms to express joy and exuberance—as in the title song for Singin' in the Rain or "I Got Rhythm" in An American in Paris, whereas pensive or romantic feelings were more often expressed via ballet or modern dance, as in "Heather on the Hill" from Brigadoon or "Our Love Is Here to Stay" from An American in Paris.

Kelly in rehearsal with Sugar Ray Robinson and assistant Jeanne Coyne, his future wife in the NBC Omnibus television special Dancing is a Man's Game, 1958

According to Delamater, Kelly's work "seems to represent the fulfillment of dance–film integration in the 1940s and 1950s". While Fred Astaire had revolutionized the filming of dance in the 1930s by insisting on full-figure photography of dancers, while allowing only a modest degree of camera movement, Kelly freed up the camera, making greater use of space, camera movement, camera angles, and editing, creating a partnership between dance movement and camera movement without sacrificing full-figure framing.

Kelly's reasoning behind this was that he felt the kinetic force of live dance often evaporated when brought to film, and he sought to partially overcome this by involving the camera in movement and giving the dancer a greater number of directions in which to move. Examples of this abound in Kelly's work and are well illustrated in the "Prehistoric Man" sequence from On the Town and "The Hat My Father Wore on St. Patrick's Day" from Take Me Out to the Ball Game.

In 1951, he summed up his vision as: "If the camera is to make a contribution at all to dance, this must be the focal point of its contribution; the fluid background, giving each spectator an undistorted and altogether similar view of dancer and background. To accomplish this, the camera is made fluid, moving with the dancer, so that the lens becomes the eye of the spectator, your eye".

Kelly's athleticism gave his moves a distinctive broad, muscular quality, and this was a deliberate choice on his part, as he explained: "There's a strong link between sports and dancing, and my own dancing springs from my early days as an athlete ... I think dancing is a man's game and if he does it well he does it better than a woman." Caron said that while dancing with Astaire she felt like she was floating, Kelly danced close to the ground. He railed against what he saw as the widespread effeminacy in male dancing, which, in his opinion, "tragically" stigmatized the genre, alienating boys from entering the field:

Dancing does attract effeminate young men. I don't object to that as long as they don't dance effeminately. I just say that if a man dances effeminately, he dances badly—just as if a woman comes out on stage and starts to sing bass. Unfortunately, people confuse gracefulness with softness. John Wayne is a graceful man and so are some of the great ballplayers ... but, of course, they don't run the risk of being called sissies.

In his view, "one of our problems is that so much dancing is taught by women. You can spot many male dancers who have this tuition by their arm movements—they are soft, limp, and feminine." He acknowledged that in spite of his efforts—in TV programs such as Dancing: A Man's Game (1958) for example—the situation changed little over the years. He also sought to break from the class-conscious conventions of the 1930s and early 40s, when top hat and tails or tuxedos were the norm, by dancing in casual or everyday work clothes, so as to make his dancing more relevant to the cinema-going public. His first wife, actress and dancer Betsy Blair said:

A sailor suit or his white socks and loafers, or the T-shirts on his muscular torso, gave everyone the feeling that he was a regular guy, and perhaps they, too, could express love and joy by dancing in the street or stomping through puddles ... he democratized the dance in movies.

In particular, he wanted to create a completely different image from that associated with Fred Astaire, not least because he believed his physique did not suit such refined elegance: "I used to envy his cool, aristocratic style, so intimate and contained. Fred wears top hat and tails to the manner born—I put them on and look like a truck driver."

== Personal life ==
From the mid-1940s through the early 1950s, his wife Betsy Blair and he organized weekly parties at their Beverly Hills home, and they often played an intensely competitive and physical version of charades, known as "The Game".

His papers are housed at the Howard Gotlieb Archival Research Center at Boston University.

Late in life, Kelly was awarded Irish citizenship under Ireland's Citizenship by Foreign Birth program. The application was initiated on his behalf by his wife Patricia Ward Kelly.

On December 22, 1983, the actor's Beverly Hills mansion burned down. Faulty Christmas tree wiring was blamed. His family and pets escaped. Kelly suffered a burned hand.

=== Marriages ===
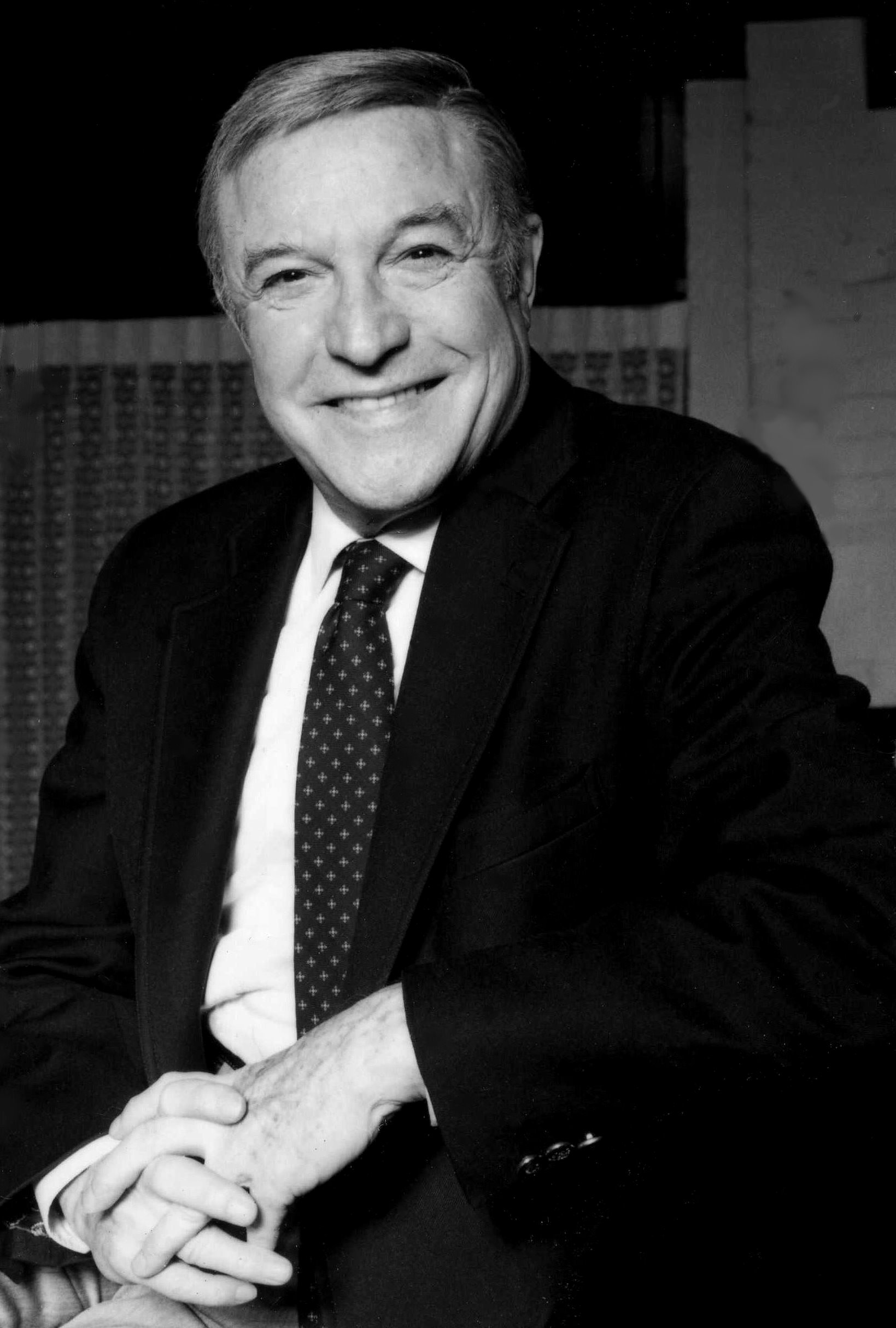
Kelly, photographed by Allan Warren, in 1986

Kelly married three times. His first marriage was to 17-year-old actress Betsy Blair in 1941. They met the previous year in 1940 at an audition where Kelly hired Blair to work as a dancer for a nightclub revue. They had one child, Kerry (b. 1942), and they divorced in April 1957.

In 1960, Kelly married his choreographic assistant, Jeanne Coyne. She had previously been married to Stanley Donen between 1948 and 1951. Kelly and Coyne had two children, Timothy (b. 1962) and Bridget (b. 1964). This marriage lasted until Coyne died in 1973.

Kelly married Patricia Ward in 1990, when he was 77 and she was 30. Their marriage lasted until his death in 1996, and she has never remarried.

=== Political and religious views ===
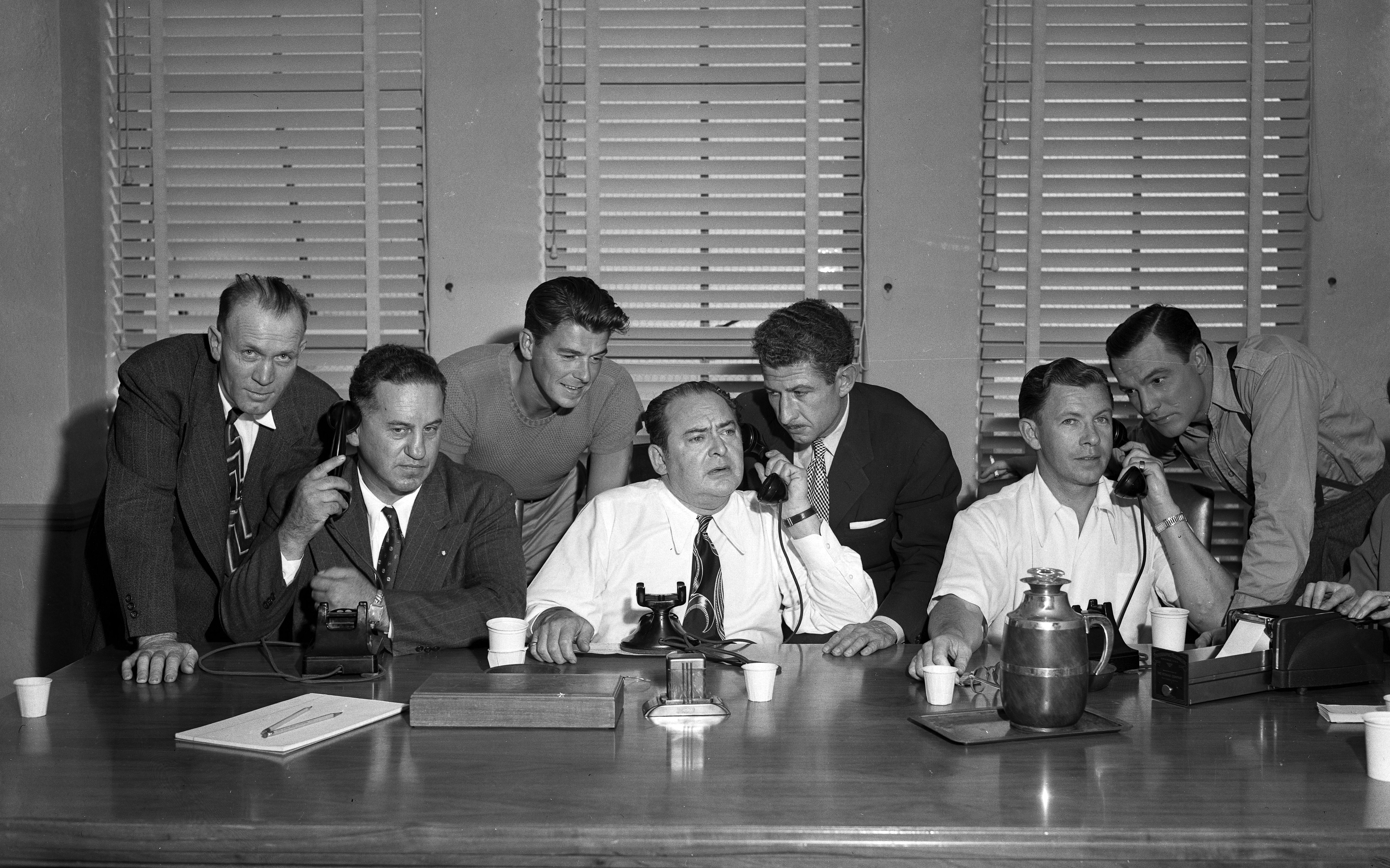
Seven actors and studio workers during a telephone conference held in the aftermath of Hollywood Black Friday in which American Federation of Labor officials denied issuing a "clarification" which set off the film strike, October 26, 1946. (L-R): James Skelton, Herbert Sorrell, Ronald Reagan, Edward Arnold, Roy Tindall, George Murphy, and Gene Kelly.

Kelly was a lifelong supporter of the Democratic Party. His period of greatest prominence coincided with the McCarthy era in the US. In 1947, he was part of the Committee for the First Amendment, the Hollywood delegation that flew to Washington to protest against the first official hearings which were held by the House Committee on Un-American Activities. His first wife, Betsy Blair, was a communist sympathizer, and when United Artists, which had offered Blair a part in Marty (1955), was considering withdrawing her under pressure from the American Legion, Kelly successfully threatened MGM's influence on United Artists with a pullout from It's Always Fair Weather unless his wife was restored to the part. He used his position on the board of directors of the Writers Guild of America West on a number of occasions to mediate disputes between unions and the Hollywood studios.

Kelly was raised as a Roman Catholic and he was a member of the Good Shepherd Parish and the Catholic Motion Picture Guild in Beverly Hills, California. He became disenchanted with the Roman Catholic Church following its support for the Nationalist forces of Francisco Franco during the Spanish Civil War, and he officially severed his ties with the church in September 1939. This separation was prompted, in part, by a trip which Kelly took to Mexico in which he became convinced that the church had failed to help the poor in Mexico..

He was supportive of Senator Ted Kennedy in the 1980 Democratic presidential primaries.

== Illness and death ==
Kelly's health steadily declined in the late 1980s and early 1990s. In July 1994, he suffered a stroke and stayed in the Ronald Reagan UCLA Medical Center hospital for seven weeks. In early 1995, he suffered another stroke which left him severely disabled. Kelly died on February 2, 1996.

== Awards and honors ==
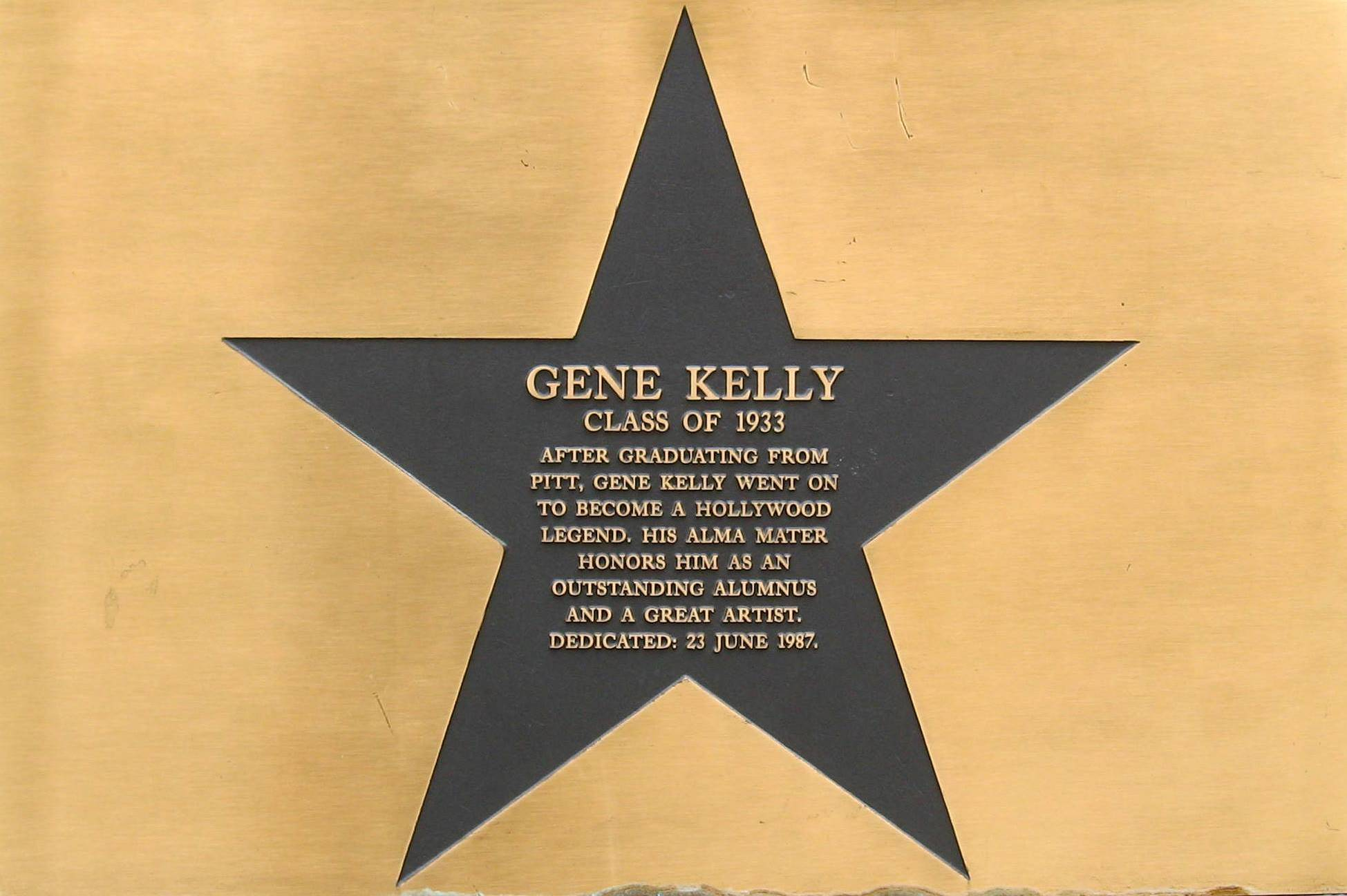
A plaque honoring Gene Kelly at his alma mater, the University of Pittsburgh

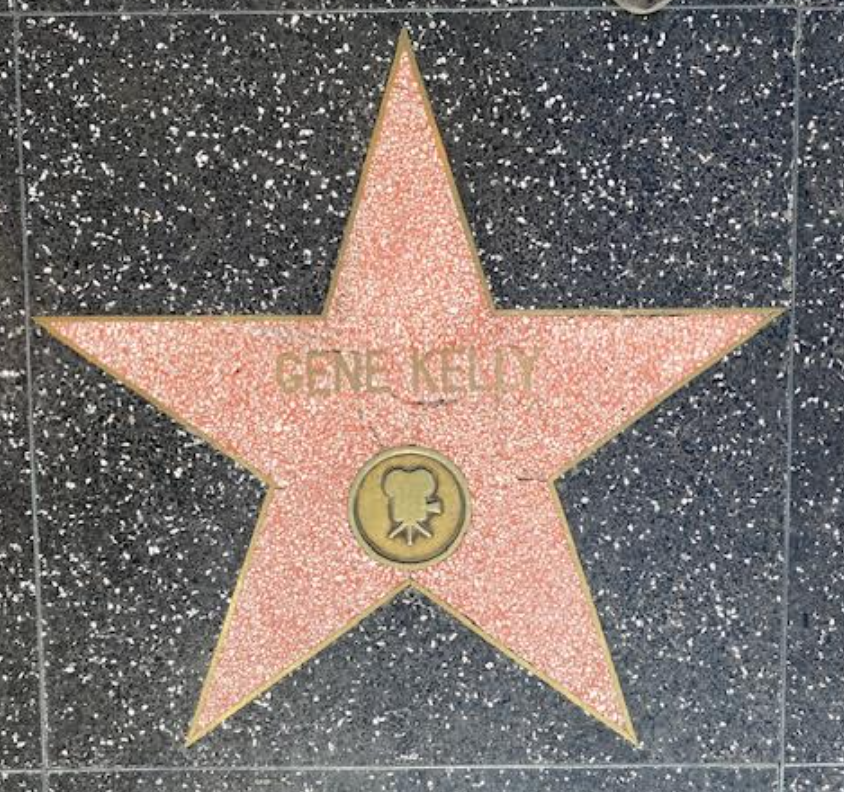
Gene Kelly's Star on the Hollywood Walk of Fame.

- 1942 – Best Actor award from the National Board of Review for his performance in For Me and My Gal
- 1946 – Academy Award nomination for Best Actor in Anchors Aweigh (1945)
- 1951 – Nominated for a Golden Globe Award for Best Actor in a Motion Picture Musical or Comedy for An American in Paris
- 1952 – Honorary Academy Award "in appreciation of his versatility as an actor, singer, director and dancer, and specifically for his brilliant achievements in the art of choreography on film." This Oscar was lost in a fire in 1983 and replaced at the 1984 Academy Awards.
- 1953 – Nomination from the Directors Guild of America, Best Director for Singin' in the Rain, 1952 (shared with Stanley Donen).
- 1956 – Golden Bear at the 6th Berlin International Film Festival for Invitation to the Dance.
- 1958 – Nomination for Golden Laurel Award for Best Male Musical Performance in Les Girls.
- 1958 – Dance Magazine's annual TV Award for Dancing: A Man's Game from the Omnibus television series. It was also nominated for an Emmy for best singing.
- 1960 – In France, Kelly was made a Chevalier of the Legion of Honor.
- 1960 - Star on the Hollywood Walk of Fame for motion pictures
- 1962 – Gene Kelly Dance Film Festival staged by the Museum of Modern Art
- 1964 – Best Actor Award for What a Way to Go! (1964) at the Locarno International Film Festival
- 1967 – Emmy for Outstanding Children's Program for Jack and the Beanstalk
- 1970 – Nomination for Golden Globe, Best Director for Hello, Dolly!, 1969
- 1970 – Nomination from the Directors Guild of America, Best Director for Hello, Dolly!, 1969
- 1981 – Cecil B. DeMille Award at Golden Globes
- 1981 – Kelly was the subject of a 2-week film festival in France
- 1982 – Lifetime Achievement Award in the fifth annual Kennedy Center Honors
- 1985 – Lifetime Achievement Award from the American Film Institute
- 1989 – Life Achievement Award from Screen Actors Guild
- 1991 – Pittsburgh Civic Light Opera inaugurated the Gene Kelly Awards, given annually to high-school musicals in Allegheny County, Pennsylvania.
- 1992 – Induction into the American Theater Hall of Fame
- 1994 – National Medal of Arts awarded by United States President Bill Clinton
- 1994 – The Three Tenors performed "Singin' in the Rain" in his presence during a concert at Dodger Stadium in Los Angeles.
- 1996 – Honorary César Award, the César is the main national film award in France.
- 1996 – At the Academy Awards ceremony, director Quincy Jones organized a tribute to the just-deceased Kelly, in which Savion Glover performed the dance to "Singin' in the Rain".
- 1997 – Ranked number 26 in Empire (UK) magazine's "The Top 100 Movie Stars of All Time" list
- 1999 – Ranked number 15 in the American Film Institute's "Greatest Male Legends" of Classic Hollywood list
- 2013 – "Singin' in the Rain" ranked number one in "The Nation's Favorite Dance Moment".

== Work ==
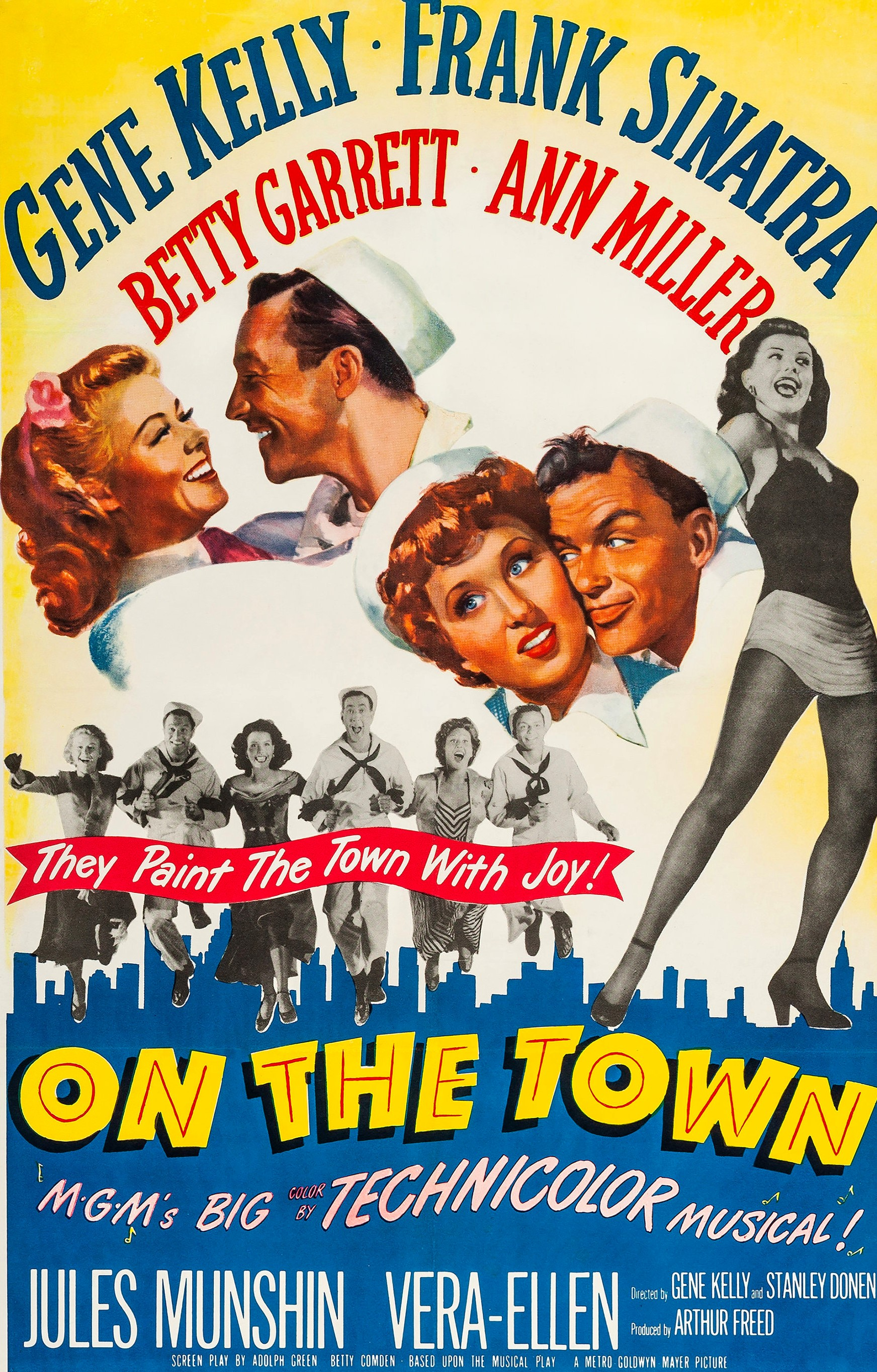
On the Town (1949)

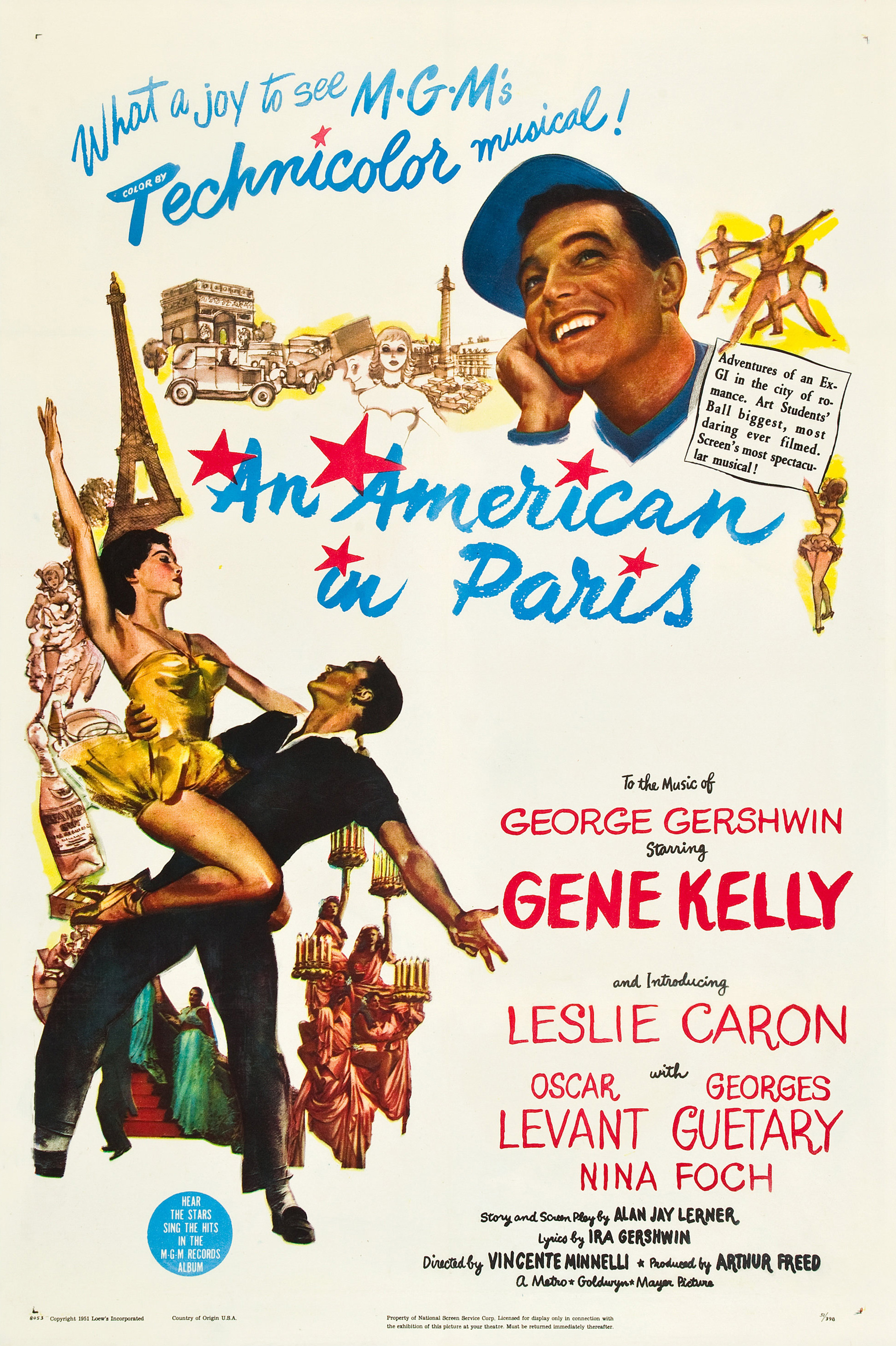
An American in Paris (1951)

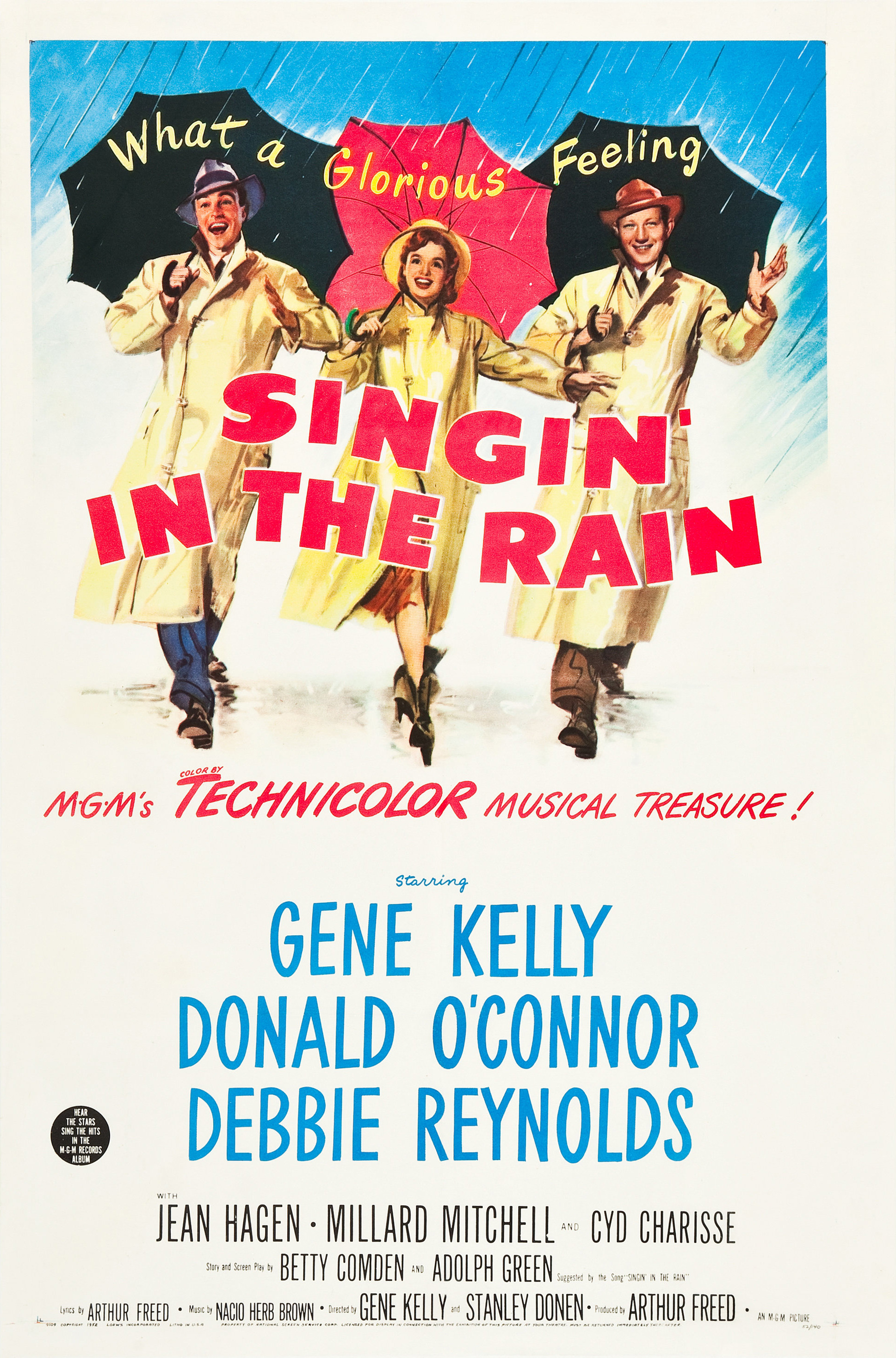
Singin' in the Rain (1952)

=== Musical films ===
Kelly appeared as actor, singer and dancer in musical films. He always choreographed his own dance routines and often the dance routines of others and used assistants. As was the practice at the time, he was rarely formally credited in the film titles.

=== Theatre ===
Date	Production	Role	Venue
1938–1939	Leave It to Me!	Secretary to Mr. Goodhue; Chorus	Imperial Theatre, Broadway
1939	One for the Money	Ensemble	Booth Theatre, Broadway
1939–1940	The Time of Your Life	Performer – Harry; Choreographer	Booth Theatre, Broadway
1940–1941	Pal Joey	Performer – Joey Evans	Ethel Barrymore Theatre, Broadway; St. James Theatre, Broadway
1941–1942	Best Foot Forward	Choreography	Ethel Barrymore Theatre, Broadway
1958–1960	Flower Drum Song	Director	St. James Theatre, Broadway
1974	Take Me Along	Performer – Sid Davis	The Muny, Regional
1979	Coquelico	Producer	22 Steps, New York
1985–1986	Singin' in the Rain	Original film choreography	Gershwin Theatre, Broadway

=== Television ===
Year	Title	Role	Notes
1957	Schlitz Playhouse of Stars	Tom T. Triplet	Episode: "The Life You Save"
1958	Omnibus	Himself	Episode: "Dancing: A Man's Game"
1962–1963	Going My Way	Father Chuck O'Malley	30 episodes
1965	Gene Kelly: New York, New York	Himself	Directed by Woody Allen
1965	The Julie Andrews Show	Himself	Television special
1967	Jack and the Beanstalk	Jeremy Keen, Proprietor (Peddler)	Television movie
1971	The Funny Side	Himself (host)	6 episodes
1973	Magnavox Presents Frank Sinatra	Himself	Television special
1973-1978	The Dean Martin Celebrity Roast	Himself	8 episodes
1977	Yabba Dabba Doo! The Happy World of Hanna-Barbera	Himself (host)	Television special
1978	Gene Kelly: An American in Pasadena	Himself	Television special
1979	The Mary Tyler Moore Hour	Himself (guest)	Episode: #1.5
1981	The Muppet Show	Himself	Episode: "Gene Kelly"
1984	The Love Boat	Charles Dane	Episode: "Hong Kong Cruise: Polly's Poker Palace/Shop Ahoy/Double Date/The Hong Kong Affair/Two Tails of a City"
1985	North and South	Senator Charles Edwards	Miniseries
1986	Sins	Eric Hovland	Miniseries
2007	Family Guy	Himself	Appeared dancing with Stewie in his role from Anchors Aweigh (film) with Stewie replacing Jerry Mouse. Episode was season 5, episode 9: Road to Rupert.

=== Documentaries ===
- 1999 – Anatomy of a Dancer, directed by Robert Trachtenberg, PBS, 2002
- 2013 – Gene Kelly, to Live and Dance, by Bertrand Tessier, France 5, 2017

=== Radio ===
Year	Program	Episode	Ref
1943	Suspense Mystery Radio Play	Thieves Fall Out	
1946	Hollywood Players	The Glass Key	
1949	Suspense Mystery Radio Play	To Find Help	
