= For Me and My Gal (film) =

1942 film by Busby Berkeley

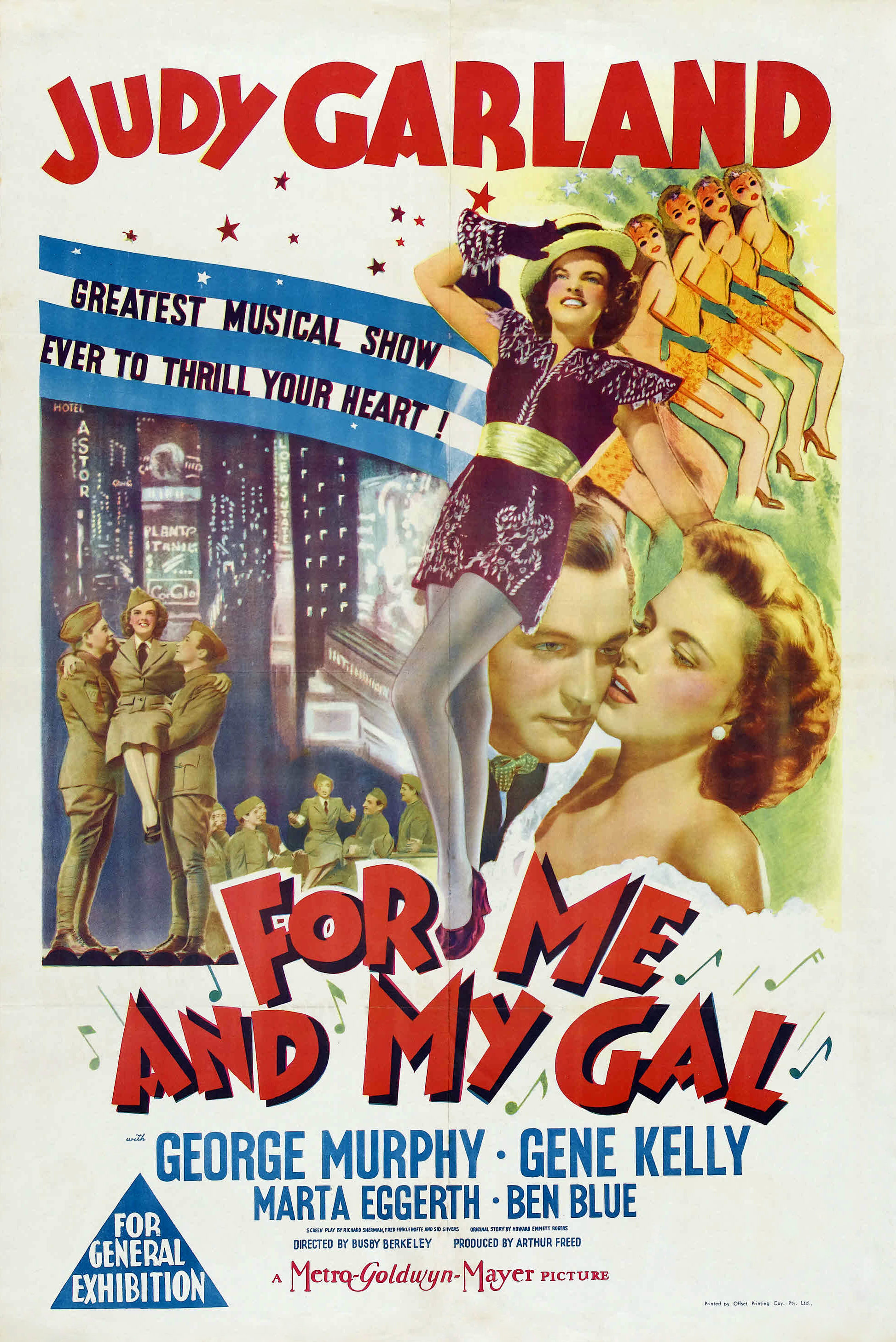
- Theatrical release poster
- Directed by: Busby Berkeley
- Screenplay by: Richard Sherman; Fred F. Finklehoffe; Sid Silvers
- Story by: Howard Emmett Rogers
- Produced by: Arthur Freed
- Starring: Judy Garland; Gene Kelly; George Murphy
- Cinematography: William H. Daniels
- Edited by: Ben Lewis
- Music by: Roger Edens (adaptation); Georgie Stoll (musical direction); Conrad Salinger; Leo Arnaud; George Bassman (vocals and orchestrations); Bobby Connolly (musical numbers)
- Production company: Metro-Goldwyn-Mayer
- Distributed by: Loew's Inc.
- Release date: October 21, 1942
- Running time: 104 minutes
- Country: United States
- Language: English
- Budget: $841,000
- Box office: $4.4 million

For Me and My Gal is a 1942 American musical film directed by Busby Berkeley, and starring Judy Garland, George Murphy, Martha Eggerth, Ben Blue and Gene Kelly in his film debut. The film was written by Richard Sherman, Fred F. Finklehoffe and Sid Silvers, based on a story by Howard Emmett Rogers inspired by a true story about vaudeville actors Harry Palmer and Jo Hayden, when Palmer was drafted into World War I. The film was a production of the Arthur Freed unit at MGM.

== Plot ==
In the heyday of vaudeville, on the verge of America's entrance into World War I, two talented performers, Jo Hayden (Judy Garland) and Harry Palmer (Gene Kelly), set their sights on playing the Palace Theatre on Broadway, the epitome of vaudeville success, and marrying immediately after.

Just weeks before their plans are to be realized, Harry gets a draft notice. Intending to obtain a short delay before reporting for duty, he intentionally smashes his hand in a trunk. That same day Jo is notified that her brother, who had been studying to be a doctor, has died in the war.

When she realizes what Harry has done, she rejects him and leaves the act. Harry then tries to undo his rash act and enlist, but none of the armed services will take him as his hand has been permanently crippled. Eventually, he resigns himself to participating in the war effort the only way left open to him, entertaining front-line troops for the YMCA.

When he and his partner find themselves dangerously close to the front, Harry heroically sets out to warn off an ambulance convoy heading into an artillery bombardment. He is wounded while destroying an enemy machine-gun emplacement ambushing the convoy and is apparently commended for his bravery.

After the war, during a victory performance at the Palace Theatre, Jo Hayden performs "When Johnny Comes Marching Home Again" and sees Harry in the audience. She runs to him and the two reunite on stage to sing "For Me and My Gal", the first song they'd ever performed.

== Cast ==
- Judy Garland as Jo Hayden
- Gene Kelly as Harry Palmer
- George Murphy as Jimmy K. Metcalf
- Martha Eggerth as Eve Minard, singer
- Ben Blue as Sid Simms, Jimmy's second banana
- Stephen McNally as Mr. Waring, manager of the Palace Theatre
- Robert Homans as New York Palace Doorman (uncredited)
- Lucille Norman as Lily Duncan (uncredited)
- Edward Peil Sr. as Jim (uncredited)
- Richard Quine as Danny Hayden, Jo's brother (uncredited)
- Addison Richards as France Doctor (uncredited)
- Keenan Wynn as Eddie Milton, theatrical agent (uncredited)

== Songs ==
Although directed by Busby Berkeley, For Me and My Gal does not have any of Berkeley's signature large-scale production numbers. The songs in the film are performed as they might have been on the vaudeville stage, choreographed by Bobby Connolly.

- "Oh, You Beautiful Doll", music by Nat D. Ayer, lyrics by A. Seymour Brown, additional lyrics by Roger Edens performed by George Murphy, Judy Garland and others
- "For Me and My Gal", music and lyrics by George W. Meyer, Edgar Leslie and E. Ray Goetz, performed by Gene Kelly and Judy Garland
- "When You Wore a Tulip and I Wore a Big Red Rose", music by Percy Wenrich, lyrics by Jack Mahoney, performed by Kelly and Garland
- "After You've Gone", music by Turner Layton, lyrics by Henry Creamer, sung by Judy Garland.
- "Ballin' the Jack", music by Chris Smith, lyrics by Jim Burris, sung and danced by Kelly and Garland.
- "Till We Meet Again", music by Richard A. Whiting, lyrics by Raymond B. Egan, sung by Eggerth and the ensemble.
- The film also contains portions of a number of songs popular during World War I, including "By the Beautiful Sea", "There's a Long, Long Trail", "How Ya Gonna Keep 'em Down on the Farm (After They've Seen Paree)?", "Where Do We Go from Here, Boys", "It's a Long Way to Tipperary", "Good Bye Broadway, Hello France", "(There are) Smiles (That Make Us Happy)", "Oh! Frenchy", "When Johnny Comes Marching Home Again" and "Pack Up Your Troubles in Your Old Kit-Bag, and Smile, Smile, Smile".
- Two additional songs were intended to be included: "Spell of the Waltz", which was to be performed by Marta Eggerth and a male chorus and "Three Cheers for the Yanks", written by Ralph Blane and Hugh Martin.

== Production ==
For Me and My Gal marked the first real "adult" role for the nineteen-year-old Judy Garland, who had played juvenile parts until then, many of them opposite Mickey Rooney. The original script had called for Harry Palmer to be involved with two women, a singer, which was to be Garland's role, and a dancer, who would have most of the dramatic scenes, but Garland's acting coach Stella Adler, who was an advisor to MGM at the time, suggested to producer Arthur Freed that the two roles be combined, and that Garland be given the part. Adler also suggested Gene Kelly for the lead.

Kelly was 29 years old at the time, and had made a mark on Broadway as the star of Pal Joey and the choreographer of Best Foot Forward. When David O. Selznick signed him to a film contract, Kelly's intention was to return to Broadway after fulfilling his contractual obligation, but he ended up staying in Hollywood for a year because Selznick didn't have a role for him. When Arthur Freed inquired about getting Kelly for For Me and My Gal, Selznick handed over the contract, and Kelly got the part, over the objections of Freed's bosses at MGM. The casting of Kelly meant that George Murphy, who was originally going to play "Harry Palmer", was switched to playing "Jimmy Metcalf".

Gene Kelly and Judy Garland got along well – she had been in favor of his getting the part, and during shooting she helped Kelly adjust his stage acting for films, and backed him in disagreements with director Busby Berkeley, whom she did not like. Kelly and Garland went on to star together in two other films, The Pirate (1948) and Summer Stock (1950).

The film was also the American motion picture debut of Hungarian singer Martha Eggerth, who had appeared in over thirty films in Germany. Her career in Hollywood did not last long: she appeared in only two other American films.

For Me and My Gal had an estimated budget of $803,000, and was in production at MGM's Culver City studios from 3 April until 23 May 1942, with additional scenes shot in June. Working titles for the film while it was in production were "Me and My Gal" and "The Big Time".

When the film was initially previewed, the audience was dissatisfied with the ending: they thought that Jo (Garland) should end up with Jimmy (Murphy) rather than Harry (Kelly). This prompted Louis B. Mayer to order three weeks of additional shooting to give Kelly's character more of a conscience and to reduce Murphy's presence in the film.

== Release and reception ==
For Me and My Gal premiered in New York City on 21 October 1942. It grossed $4,371,000 (consisting of $2,894,000 in the US and Canada and $1,477,000 elsewhere), making it one of the big hits of the year.

The studio earned a profit of $2,098,000.

For Me and My Gal was released on VHS in the US in August 1988 by MGM/UA Home Video (#M201379) and on DVD on April 6, 2004 by Warner Home Video.

== Awards and honors ==
The film received a nomination for the Academy Award for Best Score for Roger Edens (musical adaptation) and Georgie Stoll (musical direction). In addition, Gene Kelly received a "Best Actor" award from the National Board of Review for his performance.

The film is recognized by American Film Institute in these lists:

- 2004: AFI's 100 Years...100 Songs:
  - "For Me and My Gal" – Nominated
- 2006: AFI's Greatest Movie Musicals – Nominated
