= Take Me Out to the Ball Game (film) =

1949 film by Busby Berkeley

- Theatrical release poster
- Directed by: Busby Berkeley
- Screenplay by: Harry Tugend; George Wells
- Story by: Gene Kelly; Stanley Donen
- Produced by: Arthur Freed
- Starring: Frank Sinatra; Esther Williams; Gene Kelly; Betty Garrett; Edward Arnold; Jules Munshin
- Cinematography: George Folsey
- Edited by: Blanche Sewell
- Music by: Adolph Deutsch
- Production company: Metro-Goldwyn-Mayer
- Distributed by: Loew's Inc.
- Release dates: March 9, 1949 (New York City); April 13, 1949 (United States)
- Running time: 93 minutes
- Country: United States
- Language: English
- Budget: $2,025,000
- Box office: $4,344,000

Take Me Out to the Ball Game (released in the United Kingdom as Everybody's Cheering) is a 1949 American Technicolor musical romantic comedy film directed by Busby Berkeley and produced in the Arthur Freed unit of MGM. It stars Frank Sinatra, Esther Williams, Gene Kelly, Betty Garrett, Edward Arnold, and Jules Munshin. The title and nominal theme is taken from the unofficial anthem of American baseball, "Take Me Out to the Ball Game".

The film is a remake of They Learned About Women (1930), also from MGM, starring signing comedy duo Van and Schenck in their only full-length feature.

== Plot ==
In the early 1900s, world champion baseball team, the Wolves, is preparing for spring training but is missing star players Dennis Ryan and Eddie O'Brien, who are late returning from their off-season jobs as vaudeville performers. While Eddie prefers performing, Dennis is eager to return to baseball. When they finally arrive in Sarasota, Florida, they discover the team's owner has died and bequeathed it to a distant relative, K.C. Higgins, who is actually a woman named Katherine. She impresses the team with her baseball knowledge and skills, except for Eddie, who acts condescending toward her.

Katherine imposes a strict curfew on the team, with fines for breaking it. Eddie, who wants to go out for the evening, notices Katherine swimming, and he and fellow player Nat Goldberg encourage shy Dennis to talk to her, hoping to arrange a triple date to avoid curfew. Dennis sings to her, but Katherine is not interested and politely ends the conversation. Undeterred, Eddie climbs to her balcony to impress her, but is sent away and receives a fine. During the opening game, Eddie, Dennis, and Nat entertain the crowd with a skit, and one fan, Shirley Delwyn, becomes infatuated with Dennis. Tensions rise when Katherine scolds Eddie for heckling the umpire, only to lose her own temper later. The Wolves lose, and Shirley pursues Dennis throughout the stadium, determined to win his affection.

During a mid-season break at a clambake, Katherine and Eddie share a kiss, but Katherine feels humiliated when she learns it was part of a bet. Confused about her feelings, she kisses Dennis in front of Eddie, but neither feels a spark, leading Dennis to realize his feelings for Shirley. Meanwhile, mobster Joe Lorgan, who bet a large sum against the team, sees Eddie perform and offers him a nightclub gig that conflicts with his baseball schedule. Eddie decides to secretly rehearse at night, but starts to struggle in games due to exhaustion. Mike Gilhuly, the Wolves' manager, misinterprets Eddie's decline as love troubles, suggesting Katherine spend time with him.

Eddie and Katherine privately discuss their feelings for each other when Joe interrupts and tells Katherine about Eddie's nighttime rehearsals, leading her to kick him off the team. The Wolves' chances of winning the pennant plummet without Eddie. In a bid to save the team, Eddie encourages a group of children to chant for him at the championship game, leading to a stadium-wide rally. The team joyously welcomes him back, and Katherine agrees to let him join the game. However, Shirley overhears Joe order his henchmen to ensure Eddie does not play and warns Dennis, who chooses to keep Eddie safe by knocking him out with a real baseball during their skit.

Eddie is taken to the locker room, where Joe's men, posing as doctors, knock him out every time he wakes up. Shirley recognizes the men and, with Katherine's help, gets the Wolves to throw them out. When Eddie comes to, he learns that Dennis knocked him out on purpose and furiously hits a home run before chasing Dennis around the bases, which wins the pennant for the Wolves. The police arrest Joe and his gang as the crowd lifts Eddie and Dennis into the air in celebration.

== Cast ==
- Frank Sinatra as Dennis Ryan
- Esther Williams as K.C. Higgins
- Gene Kelly as Eddie O'Brien
- Betty Garrett as Shirley Delwyn
- Edward Arnold as Joe Lorgan
- Jules Munshin as Nat Goldberg
- Richard Lane as Michael Gilhuly
- Tom Dugan as Slappy Burke
- Ed Cassidy as Teddy Roosevelt (uncredited)
- Mitchell Lewis as fisherman (uncredited)

== Production ==
The film was announced in May 1948. It was based on a story by Gene Kelly and Stanley Donen, with a script by Harry Tugend. The female lead of club owner K.C. Higgins was originally to be played by Ginger Rogers, but she withdrew a month before filming and Esther Williams replaced her. Williams claimed that Judy Garland was originally slated to star but was replaced because of substance abuse issues. Sinatra's role of Dennis Ryan was originally intended for professional baseball manager (and former player) Leo Durocher.

According to TCM's Alicia Malone, Williams maintained a positive relationship with Sinatra but did not enjoy making the film because of the exhausting directorial demands set by Kelly. Although Busby Berkeley was hired as director by producer Arthur Freed, Berkeley withdrew and much of the film was directed by Kelly and Stanley Donen. Though the reason provided for Berkeley's departure was exhaustion, his exit may have been necessitated by his chronic alcoholism and depression. However, his touch can be seen in Williams's pool sequence.

== Songs ==
- "Take Me Out to the Ball Game" (music and lyrics by Jack Norworth and Albert Von Tilzer) – Gene Kelly and Frank Sinatra, reprise by Esther Williams
- "Yes, Indeedy" (music by Roger Edens, lyrics by Betty Comden and Adolph Green) – Gene Kelly and Frank Sinatra
- "O'Brien to Ryan to Goldberg" (music by Roger Edens, lyrics by Betty Comden and Adolph Green) – Gene Kelly, Frank Sinatra and Jules Munshin
- "The Right Girl for Me" (music by Roger Edens, lyrics by Betty Comden and Adolph Green) – Frank Sinatra
- "It's Fate Baby, It's Fate" (music by Roger Edens, lyrics by Betty Comden and Adolph Green) – Frank Sinatra and Betty Garrett
- "Strictly U.S.A." (music and lyrics by Roger Edens) – Betty Garrett, Frank Sinatra, Esther Williams and Gene Kelly
- "The Hat My Dear Old Father Wore upon St. Patrick's Day" (music and lyrics by Jean Schwartz and William Jerome) – Gene Kelly

=== Deleted songs ===
- The song "Boys and Girls Like You and Me", originally written by Rodgers and Hammerstein for Oklahoma! (1943), was filmed with Sinatra singing to Garrett but was cut from the released film; the outtake survives today and is included as an extra feature on the DVD.
- "Baby Doll", sung by Kelly to Williams and including a dance, was deleted from the released film. This footage also survives and is included on the DVD.

== Reception ==
=== Box office ===
Take Me Out to the Ball Game was a box-office success, earning $2,987,000 in the United States and Canada and $978,000 overseas, resulting in a profit of $675,000.

=== Critical response ===
On March 13, 1949, Bob Thomas of the Associated Press wrote, "Take Me Out to the Ball Game is a sure cure for anybody's blues. Seldom has there been a film loaded with such fine entertainment. Bright young people like Frank Sinatra, Gene Kelly, Esther Williams, Betty Garrett and Jules Munshin make even the contrived plot likable."

The New York Times' Bosley Crowther gave the film a mixed review, concluding, "For all its high spots, however, the show lacks consistent style and pace, and the stars are forced to clown and grimace much more than becomes their speed. Actually, the plotted humor is conspicuously bush-league stuff. Don't be surprised if you see people getting up for a seventh-inning stretch."

On the review aggregator website Rotten Tomatoes, the film holds an approval rating of 95% based on 19 reviews, with an average rating of 8/10.

=== Accolades ===
Harry Tugend and George Wells were nominated for the 1950 Writers Guild of America Award in the category of Best Written American Musical. They lost to Betty Comden and Adolph Green for On the Town, another MGM musical comedy also produced by Arthur Freed and also starring Gene Kelly, Frank Sinatra, Betty Garrett, and Jules Munshin, which was released four months after the premiere of Take Me Out to the Ball Game.

== See also ==
- List of baseball films
