= On the Town (musical) =

1945 musical by Leonard Bernstein, Betty Comden, and Adolph Green

- Theatrical release poster (c. 1945)
- Music: Leonard Bernstein
- Lyrics: Betty Comden; Adolph Green
- Book: Betty Comden; Adolph Green
- Basis: Fancy Free, ballet by Jerome Robbins and Leonard Bernstein
- Productions: 1944 Broadway; 1949 Film; 1963 West End; 1971 Broadway revival 1998 Broadway revival 2007 English National Opera; 2008 Encores! concert 2014 Broadway revival 2017 London revival

On the Town is a musical with music by Leonard Bernstein and book and lyrics by Betty Comden and Adolph Green, based on Jerome Robbins' idea for his 1944 ballet Fancy Free, which he had set to Bernstein's music. The musical introduced several popular and classic songs, among them "New York, New York", "Lonely Town", "I Can Cook, Too" (for which Bernstein also wrote the lyric), and "Some Other Time". The story concerns three American sailors on a 24-hour shore leave in New York City in 1944, during World War II. Each of the three sailors meets and quickly connects with a woman.

On the Town was first produced on Broadway in 1944 and was made into a film in 1949, although the film replaced all but four of the original Broadway numbers with Hollywood-written substitutes. The show has enjoyed several major revivals. The musical integrates dance into its storytelling: Robbins made several ballets and extended dance sequences for the show, including the "Imaginary Coney Island" ballet.

== Background ==
The Jerome Robbins ballet Fancy-Free (1944), with music by Leonard Bernstein, was a hit for the American Ballet Theatre. Oliver Smith, who designed the sets, and his business partner, Paul Feigay, thought that the ballet could be turned into a Broadway musical. They convinced Robbins and Bernstein, who in turn wanted their friends Comden and Green to write the book and lyrics. When the director George Abbott was added to the project, funding was secured, including funding from the movie studio MGM in return for the film rights.

== Productions ==
=== Broadway ===
On the Town premiered on Broadway at the Adelphi Theater on December 28, 1944, directed by George Abbott and with choreography by Jerome Robbins. It closed on February 2, 1946, after 462 performances. The production starred John Battles (Gabey, who replaced Kirk Douglas before tryouts), Cris Alexander (Chip), Nancy Walker (Hildy), Sono Osato (Ivy), Betty Comden (Claire), and Adolph Green (Ozzie). The musical director was Max Goberman. The original production of On the Town was notable for its racially diverse cast and intentional avoidance of racial stereotypes. The Japanese-American dancer Sono Osato starred as Ivy; there were six African-Americans in the cast, who were treated as part of the citizenry; and nine months into the run, the black conductor Everett Lee took over the podium.

The first Broadway revival opened at the Imperial Theatre on October 31, 1971, and closed on Jan 1, 1972, after 73 performances. Donna McKechnie, Phyllis Newman, and Bernadette Peters co-starred as Ivy, Claire, and Hildy. The director and choreographer was Ron Field. Peters received a nomination for the 1972 Tony Award for Best Featured Actress in a Musical. In his review for the New York Times, Clive Barnes wrote:

the book and lyrics...have ease and a decent few laughs...The music...has worn less well, too many of the nostalgic ballads sound like sub-Puccini filtered through Glenn Miller...Mr. Field has staged the musical numbers with zest and imagination, but, with respect, he is no great shakes as a choreographer...Where Mr. Field is most successful is in the performances of his six principals, and the women are markedly better than the men. Best of all is Bernadette Peters as the Bronx nasal taxi driver...Phyllis Newman as Claire also danced and sang with just the right style and gusto. Donna McKechnie made a sweet and talented Ivy Smith.

The second Broadway revival opened at the Gershwin Theatre on November 19, 1998, and ran for 69 performances. This production began as a summer event at the Public Theater's Delacorte Theater in Central Park and made use of the venue in unique ways. Upon its Broadway Transfer, critics disparaged the subsequent production and changes as lifeless and bland by comparison. Lea Delaria's performance as Hildy the taxi driver (and especially her all-stops-out rendition of "I Can Cook, Too") won wide praise, with Ben Brantley writing "Working through the saucy double-entendres and scat embellishments of I Can Cook Too, Hildy's mating call of a solo, Ms. DeLaria makes an obliging captive of anyone watching her." Mary Testa was nominated for the 1999 Tony Award as Best Featured Actress in a Musical; Lea Delaria was nominated for the Drama Desk Award as Outstanding Featured Actress in a Musical and won the Theatre World Award.

A Broadway revival opened at the Lyric Theatre on September 20, 2014, in previews, and officially on October 16, directed by John Rando with choreography by Joshua Bergasse. The cast featured Jay Armstrong Johnson (Chip), Tony Yazbeck (Gabey) and Clyde Alves (Ozzie), and Megan Fairchild (Ivy), Alysha Umphress (Hildy), and Elizabeth Stanley (Claire) as the three women in the sailors' lives, as well as Jackie Hoffman (Madame Dilly), Michael Rupert (Judge Pitkin), and Allison Guinn (Lucy Schmeeler). A cast album was recorded at Audio Paint Studios in New York City in 2014. The production closed, after 28 previews and 368 regular performances, on September 6, 2015.

=== Other US ===
An Encores! staged concert was presented at New York City Center from November 19, 2008, through November 23, 2008, as part of a citywide celebration of Leonard Bernstein's 90th birthday. John Rando was the director, Warren Carlyle the choreographer, with a cast that featured Justin Bohon (Chip), Christian Borle (Ozzie), Tony Yazbeck (Gabey), Jessica Lee Goldyn (Ivy), Leslie Kritzer (Hildy Esterhazy), Jennifer Laura Thompson (Claire De Loone), and Andrea Martin (Madame P. Dilly).

In reviewing this production, Charles Isherwood wrote: "The production is rich in dance ... and winning performances (particularly from Tony Yazbeck as the lovelorn sailor Gabey, and a scenery-devouring Andrea Martin as a nutso-dipso voice teacher), but it's richest of all in music. There are several ballet sequences, instant reprises, jazzy pop songs, classical spoofs, and soaring ballads."

A production of On the Town opened in June 2013 at Barrington Stage Company in Massachusetts. John Rando directed the production and Joshua Bergasse choreographed. The production starred Tony Yazbeck (Gabey), Clyde Alves (Ozzie), Jay Armstrong Johnson (Chip), Alysha Umphress (Hildy), Deanna Doyle (Ivy), Elizabeth Stanley (Claire), Michael Rupert (Judge Pitkin), Allison Guinn (Lucy Schmeeler), and Nancy Opel (Madame P. Dilly). In his review Ben Brantley wrote: "John Rando's production of On the Town, the 1944 musical about three sailors on shore leave in New York City, is one of those rare revivals that remind us of what a hit show from long was originally all about. The joy of Mr. Rando's production is in its air of erotic effortlessness."

=== London ===
The first London production of On the Town opened at the Prince of Wales Theatre on May 30, 1963, and ran for 63 performances. It was directed and choreographed by Joe Layton and starred Elliott Gould and Don McKay. The main female roles were taken by two Americans, Carol Arthur and Andrea Jaffe, and an English actress, Gillian Lewis. It was not a propitious time for new musicals in London, given dramatic developments that year in British popular music. A month earlier, Bock and Harnick's She Loves Me had opened on Broadway and ran for some 300 performances, but flopped when it came to London in 1964, not least because people thought the title had something to do with the Beatles.

In 1992, Michael Tilson Thomas led the London Symphony Orchestra and an all-star, crossover cast of opera and theater performers in a semi-staged concert version produced by Deutsche Grammophon and recorded for both CD and video release. The video was also aired on the PBS series Great Performances, and in the UK on both BBC Two and BBC Radio 3 in January 1994. Participants included Frederica von Stade, Thomas Hampson, Tyne Daly, Cleo Laine, David Garrison, Samuel Ramey, and, as both narrators and performers, Comden and Green themselves. The resulting recordings included material cut at various stages of the musical's development. Thomas revived this concert edition of the work in 1996 with the San Francisco Symphony, with many of the same performers.

On The Town was part of English National Opera's repertoire, running April 20 – May 25, 2007, at the London Coliseum, with Caroline O'Connor as Hildy, with choreography by Stephen Mear.

As part of their 2017 Season, the Regent's Park Open Air Theatre staged On The Town, directed and choreographed by Drew McOnie; it is billed as the biggest dance musical ever staged at the theatre.

A semi-staged concert version was performed at the Royal Albert Hall, London, as part of the 2018 Proms, on 25 August, the exact centenary of Bernstein's birth. The London Symphony Orchestra was conducted by John Wilson.

== 1949 film version ==
The MGM film opened on December 8, 1949. It starred Gene Kelly as Gabey (who also co-directed with Stanley Donen), Frank Sinatra as Chip, and Jules Munshin as Ozzie, as well as Ann Miller (Claire), Vera-Ellen (Ivy) and Betty Garrett (Hildy). The film dispensed with many of the Bernstein songs, keeping four, including "New York, New York," and replaced the others with new songs with music by Roger Edens and lyrics by Comden and Green.

== Plot summary ==
=== Act I ===
A trio of dockyard workers mourns the start of a new workday ("I Feel Like I'm Not Out of Bed Yet"). The whistle blows at 6 AM, and three sailors emerge: Ozzie, Chip, and Gabey, excited for 24 hours of shore leave ("New York, New York"). Chip is excited to see all the sights that his father told him about after his trip to New York in 1934, with his decade-old guidebook by his side. Ozzie is interested in finding a date (or several) because Manhattan women are the prettiest in the world. Gabey is looking for one special girl, hopefully one who reminds him of his 7th-grade girlfriend, Minnie Finchley. On the subway, the three spot a poster of Ivy Smith, "Miss Turnstiles" for June. Gabey, overcome with love for the picture, takes it with him. An old lady angrily tells him that she will have him arrested for vandalism and the three run off.

Gabey wants to meet Ivy Smith, despite Chip's protests that the city is too big for things like that to happen. Ozzie, recounting an incident where Gabey saved their lives, convinces Chip to help Gabey find her. Chip grudgingly agrees and Ozzie coaches Gabey on what to do once he meets Ivy ("Gabey's Comin'," performed in the 2014 Broadway revival). The three break up, Gabey to Carnegie Hall, Ozzie to the Museum of Modern Art, and Chip to the "subway people." The three imagine what Miss Turnstiles must be like, and a ballet is performed in which Ivy demonstrates all the many different, contradictory, skills she has.

The little old lady finds a policeman and the two chase after the sailors.

A young woman cabbie named Hildy is found asleep in her cab by her irate boss S. Uperman. He fires her and tells her to return the cab in an hour or he will call the police. Looking for one last fare, she comes across Chip. It is love at first sight, at least for Hildy. She forcefully kisses Chip, but Chip wants nothing more than to find Ivy. Hildy tempts him into taking a tour of the city, but all the places he wants to go to (the Hippodrome, the Forrest Theatre to see Tobacco Road, the New York City Aquarium, and the Woolworth Building) are either no longer in existence or no longer notable. The only place Hildy wants to take Chip is her apartment ("Come Up to My Place"). Uperman joins the lady and the cop in the chase, implying Hildy stole the cab.

Ozzie goes to the museum but mistakenly arrives at the Museum of Natural History instead of the Museum of Modern Art. There he meets a budding anthropologist, Claire de Loone. She is amazed at his resemblance to a prehistoric man and asks him for his measurements. He mistakes her scientific interest for romantic interest, but as she explains, she is engaged to be married to the famous Judge Pitkin W. Bridgework. Pitkin has taught her to learn to know men scientifically, but she, like Ozzie, often gets "Carried Away." The two of them accidentally knock over a dinosaur. Waldo Figment, the professor who built the dinosaur, joins Uperman, the cop, and the lady in the chase.

Gabey mopes around the city. Without love, New York is nothing but a "Lonely Town."

At Carnegie Hall, Ivy Smith is taking lessons from Madame Dilly, a drunk who clearly does not know vocal training. Ivy is not quite as glamorous as the Miss Turnstiles contest has made her out to be. In reality, while she is studying to do all the things they said she was, she is nothing more than a "cooch dancer" at Coney Island. When Madame Dilly leaves to refill her flask, Gabey enters. He asks Ivy to go out with him, and to his surprise, she accepts. Gabey leaves ecstatically. Madame Dilly advises Ivy to break the date as "sex and art don't mix" ("Carnegie Hall Pavane").

Ozzie accompanies Claire back to her apartment, where he meets Claire's fiancé, Pitkin W. Bridgework. They try desperately to explain what they are doing together, but Pitkin does not mind ("I Understand"). He leaves them alone to go to a meeting, reminding Claire that they are to meet at Diamond Eddie's to celebrate their engagement. The two take advantage of their alone time ("Carried Away (reprise)").

Hildy brings Chip and an armful of groceries back to her apartment, promising to cook for him. Chip insists that he must leave to find Ivy. She tells him to call the IRT, but they refuse to give Chip her address or phone number. He decides that he has tried hard enough, and he and Hildy attempt to get physical when her roommate, Lucy Schmeeler, home from work with a cold, intrudes. Hildy finally gets rid of her by convincing her to go to an air-cooled movie. Hildy seduces Chip, bragging about her many talents, not the least of which is her cooking ("I Can Cook Too").

Gabey's attitude has done a full 180, and he feels "Lucky to Be Me." Ivy, about to meet Gabey at Nedick's, runs into Madame Dilly, who reminds her that if she does not do her cooch dance that night, she will be fired, and will not be able to pay Madame Dilly for her lessons. Madame Dilly threatens to smear her reputation, and she is forced to stand Gabey up.

Chip and Ozzie both arrive at Nedick's with Hildy and Claire, both dressed as Ivy Smith. Gabey is not fooled and tells them the story of how he met her. Just then, Madame Dilly arrives with a message from Ivy: she will not be coming because she instead elected to go to a fancy party. Gabey is alone and dejected, but Hildy tells him that she can get him a date: Lucy. The five go into a dance demonstrating the nightlife of the city.

=== Act II ===
At Diamond Eddie's, the dancers perform a number ("So Long Baby"). Gabey is still hung up on Miss Turnstiles, and Lucy has not shown up yet. A singer, Diana Dream, performs a very sad song, "I Wish I Was Dead," which causes Gabey to feel even sadder. Lucy calls, having accidentally gone to the Diamond Eddie's in Yonkers. The group decides to go to the Congacabana at the suggestion of Claire, but on their way out, they run into Pitkin. Ozzie and Claire try to explain the situation, but as before, all Pitkin says is "I Understand (reprise)." The gang leaves for the Congacabana while Pitkin stays behind to pay the check.

At the Congacabana, Dolores Dolores (the same performer as "Diana Dream") sings the same sad song as before, in Spanish. Hildy interrupts her, saying she had gotten a request to sing. Hildy, as well as Ozzie, Claire, and Chip try to lift Gabey's spirits by reminding him that he can count on them ("Ya Got Me"). As they are about to depart for another nightclub, the Slam Bang Club, Pitkin arrives ("I Understand (reprise)"). Claire tells him once again to pay the check, also to wait for Lucy and come to the Slam Bang later.

At the Slam Bang Club, Madame Dilly is in a drunken stupor. Gabey asks her where Ivy is, and she lets it slip that she is at Coney Island. Gabey runs off to find her. Chip and Ozzie, afraid that he will not be able to get back to the ship on time, rush after him. On their way out, they come across Lucy and Pitkin. Claire once again leaves him to go with Ozzie. Pitkin recalls all the times in his life that he "understood" and realizes he has been played the fool by everyone, including Claire ("Pitkin's Song (I Understand)"). He also bonds with Lucy and the two of them join the chase along with the little old lady, the police officers, Figment, and Uperman.

Riding the subway, Gabey dreams about Coney Island and Ivy. An extended dance sequence occurs with Ivy and a dream Gabey in a boxing match ("Subway Ride/The Great Lover Displays Himself/The Imaginary Coney Island").

The other four have just missed Gabey and are riding another subway car. They wonder about their future after the men have to go back to the ship ("Some Other Time").

At Coney Island, Ivy, along with several other girls, dances in a show called Rajah Bimmy's Harem Scarem ("The Real Coney Island"). Gabey sees Ivy and accidentally tears her already skimpy outfit off. She is arrested for indecent exposure as the chasers arrive and demand the others be arrested. Claire hopes Pitkin will get her out of the situation, but he no longer trusts her and has the three men brought to the naval authorities. The girls ask Pitkin if he has ever "committed an indiscretion," which he staunchly denies. Just then, he sneezes in the same way as Lucy Schmeeler, casting doubt on his claim.

As the clock chimes six, the sailors prepare to get back on the ship. Just then, the girls come running to them, telling them that Pitkin understood. They say a fond farewell as three new sailors leave the ship, eager to have their own adventures in New York City ("New York, New York (reprise)/Finale Act II").

== Musical numbers ==
Act I

- Overture (The Star-Spangled Banner)—Orchestra
- I Feel Like I'm Not Out of Bed Yet—Workmen
- New York, New York—Ozzie, Chip, and Gabey
- Gabey's Comin'—Gabey, Ozzie, Chip, and Girls*
- Presentation of Miss Turnstiles—Announcer, Contestants, Ivy, and Manhattanites
- Come Up to My Place—Hildy and Chip
- Carried Away—Claire and Ozzie
- Carried Away (Encore)—Claire and Ozzie
- Lonely Town / Pas de deux / Chorale—Gabey and Ensemble
- Carnegie Hall Pavane (Do-Do-Re-Do)—Madame Dilly, Ivy, and Women of Carnegie Hall
- I Understand (Verse)—Pitkin
- Carried Away (Reprise)—Ozzie and Claire
- I Can Cook Too—Hildy
- I Can Cook Too (Encore)—Hildy
- Lucky to Be Me—Gabey and Full Company
- Finale Act I: Times Square Ballet—Company

Act II

- Entr'acte—Orchestra
- So Long, Baby—Diamond Eddie's Girls
- I Wish I Was Dead—Diana Dream
- I Understand (Recitative)—Pitkin
- I Wish I Was Dead (Spanish)—Senorita Dolores Dolores
- Ya Got Me—Hildy, Claire, Ozzie, and Chip
- Ya Got Me (Encore)—Hildy, Claire, Ozzie, and Chip
- I Understand (Recitative)—Pitkin
- I Understand (Pitkin's Song)—Pitkin
- Subway Ride / Imaginary Coney Island—Gabey, Ivy, and Dance Ensemble
- Some Other Time—Claire, Hildy, Ozzie, and Chip
- The Real Coney Island—Rajah Bimmy
- Finale Act II: New York, New York (Reprise)—Full Company

* Cut from the original Broadway production, but in the published vocal score and included in the 2014 Broadway production.

Cut Numbers

- Ain't Got No Tears Left—A nightclub singer
- The Intermission's Great—Ensemble

== Casts ==
=== Original cast ===
Character	Original Broadway cast (1944)	Original London cast (1963)	First Broadway revival (1971)	Second Broadway revival (1998)	Third Broadway revival (2014)
Gabey	John Battles	Don McKay	Ron Husmann	Perry Laylon Ojeda	Tony Yazbeck
Ivy	Sono Osato	Andrea Jaffe	Donna McKechnie	Tai Jimenez	Megan Fairchild
Ozzie	Adolph Green	Elliott Gould	Remak Ramsay	Robert Montano	Clyde Alves
Claire	Betty Comden	Gillian Lewis	Phyllis Newman	Sarah Knowlton	Elizabeth Stanley
Chip	Cris Alexander	Franklin Kiser	Jess Richards	Jesse Tyler Ferguson	Jay Armstrong Johnson
Hildy	Nancy Walker	Carol Arthur	Bernadette Peters	Lea DeLaria	Alysha Umphress
Maude P. Dilly	Susan Steell	Elspeth March	Fran Stevens	Mary Testa	Jackie Hoffman
Pitkin	Robert Chisholm	John Humphrey	Tom Avera	Jonathan Freeman	Michael Rupert

== Awards and honors ==
=== 1972 Broadway revival ===
Year	Award	Category	Nominee	Result
1972	Tony Award	Best Performance by a Featured Actress in a Musical	Bernadette Peters	Nominated
1972	Theatre World Award		Jess Richards	Won

=== 1998 Broadway revival ===
Year	Award	Category	Nominee	Result
1998	Drama Desk Award	Outstanding Featured Actress in a Musical	Lea DeLaria	Nominated
1998	Outer Critics Circle Awards	Outstanding Revival of a Musical		Nominated
1998	Theatre World Award		Lea DeLaria	Won
1999	Tony Award	Best Performance by a Featured Actress in a Musical	Mary Testa	Nominated

=== 2014 Broadway revival ===
Year	Award	Category	Nominee	Result
2015	Tony Award	Best Revival of a Musical		Nominated
2015	Tony Award	Best Performance by a Leading Actor in a Musical	Tony Yazbeck	Nominated
2015	Tony Award	Best Direction of a Musical	John Rando	Nominated
2015	Tony Award	Best Choreography	Joshua Bergasse	Nominated
2015	Drama Desk Award	Outstanding Revival of a Musical		Nominated
2015	Drama Desk Award	Outstanding Choreography	Joshua Bergasse	Nominated
2015	Drama Desk Award	Outstanding Featured Actress in a Musical	Elizabeth Stanley	Nominated
2015	Outer Critics Circle Award	Outstanding Revival of a Musical		Nominated
2015	Outer Critics Circle Award	Outstanding Actor in a Musical	Tony Yazbeck	Nominated
2015	Outer Critics Circle Award	Outstanding Featured Actress in a Musical	Megan Fairchild	Nominated
2015	Outer Critics Circle Award	Outstanding Choreographer	Joshua Bergasse	Nominated
2015	Drama League Award	Outstanding Revival of a Musical		Nominated
2015	Drama League Award	Distinguished Performance	Tony Yazbeck	Nominated
2015	Theatre World Award		Megan Fairchild	Won
2015	Astaire Awards	Best Male Dancer	Tony Yazbeck	Won
2015	Astaire Awards	Best Male Dancer	Jay Armstrong Johnson	Nominated
2015	Astaire Awards	Best Male Dancer	Clyde Alves	Nominated
2015	Astaire Awards	Best Female Dancer	Megan Fairchild	Nominated
2015	Astaire Awards	Best Choreographer	Joshua Begasse	Won

=== 2017 London revival ===
Year	Award	Category	Nominee	Result
2018	Laurence Olivier Award	Best Musical Revival		Nominated
