= Comden and Green =

American songwriting team

Comden and Green was the 60-year songwriting partnership of Betty Comden (1917–2006) and Adolph Green (1914–2002). The two first collaborated in 1941 at the Village Gate in New York City, as writers and performers in a nightclub act called The Revuers.

== Collaboration ==
They debuted as book writers and lyricists with the musical On the Town (1944), in which they were also part of the original Broadway cast. Following their involvement with Billion Dollar Baby which premiered the following year, they signed with Metro-Goldwyn-Mayer; the agreement debuted with the film Good News (1947), for which they were screenwriters and additional lyricists. Comden and Green then continued their career with musical films: Singin' In The Rain (1952), The Band Wagon (1953), It's Always Fair Weather (1955), and The Barkleys of Broadway (1949). In 1949, they adapted On the Town into a film, also writing the lyrics.

Comden and Green's role in the revue Two on the Aisle (1951) marked the beginning of their collaboration with the composer Jule Styne, which includes: Peter Pan (1954), Bells Are Ringing (1956), Say, Darling (1958), Do Re Mi (1960), Subways Are for Sleeping (1961), Fade Out – Fade In (1964), and Hallelujah, Baby! (1968). Their play Wonderful Town (1953), won the Tony Award for Best Musical. Bells Are Ringing starred Judy Holliday, whom Comden and Green were close with; they later adapted it into a 1960 film; prior to this, they also made Auntie Mame, a 1958 film adaptation of the play Mame. They continued producing films and starred in plays, with their most successful revue being A Party with Betty Comden and Adolph Green (1958), though they ended their filmmaking career with What A Way To Go! in 1964. This thus marked the late 1950s and 1960s as a period of high activity for Comden and Green.

They began the 1970s with writing the book for the play Applause (1970). They then made the play On The Twentieth Century (1978), which won a Tony Award for Best Book of a Musical; Cy Coleman also won a Tony Award for Best Original Score. Despite being unsuccessful, A Doll's Life (1982; adapted from the 1879 play A Doll's House) showed Comden and Green's adaptability to various genres, with it being a more dramatic work. This was later redeemed by the success of their play The Will Rogers Follies (1991), which gave them and Coleman another Tony Award for Best Original Score. During this period, they also starred in the films My Favorite Year (1982), I Want to Go Home (1989), and Garbo Talks (1984). Comden and Green also appeared in many concerts, including Follies in Concert (1985). In 1989, Green starred as Dr. Pangloss for the London Symphony Orchestra's remake of the operetta Candide.

== Credits ==
=== Broadway ===
- On the Town (1944)
- Billion Dollar Baby (1945)
- Two on the Aisle (1951)
- Wonderful Town (1953)
- Peter Pan (1954)
- Bells Are Ringing (1956)
- Say, Darling (1958)
- A Party with Betty Comden and Adolph Green (1958)
- Do Re Mi (1960)
- Subways Are for Sleeping (1961)
- Fade Out – Fade In (1964)
- Hallelujah, Baby! (1967)
- Applause (1970)
- Lorelei (1974)
- On the Twentieth Century (1978)
- The Madwoman of Central Park West (1979)
- A Doll's Life (1982)
- Singin' in the Rain (1985)
- The Will Rogers Follies (1991)

=== Film ===
- Good News (1947)
- The Barkleys of Broadway (1949)
- On the Town (1949)
- Singin' in the Rain (1952)
- The Band Wagon (1953)
- It's Always Fair Weather (1955)
- Auntie Mame (1958)
- Bells Are Ringing (1960)
- What a Way to Go! (1964)
- My Favorite Year (1982)

== Discography ==
- A Party with Betty Comden and Adolph Green (Capitol Records, 1959)
- A Party with Betty Comden and Adolph Green (DRG Records S2L-5177, 1977)
- On the Town - The First Full Length Recording (Columbia Broadway Masterworks SICP 31278, 2019)
