= A Party with Betty Comden and Adolph Green =

- 1977 Recording
- Music: Leonard Bernstein; Jule Styne; André Previn; Saul Chaplin; Roger Edens; Cy Coleman
- Lyrics: Betty Comden and Adolph Green
- Book: Betty Comden and Adolph Green
- Basis: Songs of Comden and Green
- Productions: 1958 Off-Broadway; 1958 Broadway; 1977 Broadway revival
- Awards: Obie Award for Best Musical

A Party with Betty Comden and Adolph Green is a musical revue with a book and lyrics by Betty Comden and Adolph Green and music by Leonard Bernstein, Jule Styne, André Previn, Saul Chaplin, and Roger Edens.

The performance was composed of material written by Comden and Green for stage shows, films, and their former comedy troupe The Revuers.

Comden and Green originally performed the revue A Party Off-Broadway at the Cherry Lane Theatre for 5 performances in November 1958.

The revue was then produced on Broadway by the Theatre Guild, opening on December 23, 1958, at the John Golden Theatre, where it closed on May 23, 1959, after 82 performances. It won the Obie Award for Best Musical An original cast recording was released by Capitol Records (LP# SWAO-1197).

After four previews, a revival opened on Broadway on February 10, 1977, at the Morosco Theatre, where it remained for six weeks before transferring to the Little Theatre to complete its 92-performance run on April 30, 1977. This production included material written since the original 1958 show, including Do Re Mi and Subways Are For Sleeping. The duo then took the show on tour, starting in Washington, DC. A revival cast album was recorded live at the Arena Theatre in Washington, D.C. was released by DRG.

== Discography ==
- A Party with Betty Comden and Adolph Green (Capitol Records, 1959)
- A Party with Betty Comden and Adolph Green (DRG Records S2L-5177, 1977)

== Songs and sketches ==
- "I Said Good Morning"
- "Movie Ads"
- "The Reader's Digest"
- "The Screenwriters"
- "The Banshee Sisters"
- "Baroness Bazooka"
- "New York, New York"
- "Lonely Town"
- "Lucky to be Me"
- "Some Other Time"
- "I Get Carried Away"
- "The French Lesson"
- "If You Hadn't, But You Did"
- "Catch Our Act at the Met"
- "One Hundred Easy Ways to Lose a Man"
- "Ohio"
- "Wrong Note Rag"
- "A Quiet Girl"
- "Oh My Mysterious Lady"
- "Captain Hook's Waltz"
- "Never Never Land"
- "Inspiration"
- "Just in Time"
- "The Party's Over"
- "Capital Gains"
- "Make Someone Happy"
- "The Lost Word"
- "Simplified Language"
