= Sederholm =

Sederholm is a surname. Notable people with the surname include:

- Emelie Sederholm (born 1994), Finnish singer-songwriter
- Jakob Sederholm (1863–1934), Finnish geologist
- Jess Richards, born Richard Sederholm (died 1994), American actor
- Katarina Sederholm (born 1968), Finnish-Norwegian athlete
- Lars Sederholm, Swedish-British equestrian trainer
