= Our Love Affair =

"Our Love Affair" is a song recorded by Frank Sinatra with the Tommy Dorsey Band in 1940. which reached No. 5 in the Billboard charts. Its music is by Roger Edens and lyrics are by Arthur Freed. It was written for the M-G-M musical Strike Up the Band (1940), starring Mickey Rooney and Judy Garland.

== Other recordings ==
- Judy Garland – recorded for Decca Records (catalog No. 3593A) on December 18, 1940.
- Harry Roy & His Band (vocal by Julie Dawn) – recorded 13 December 1940. (Regal Zonophone MR 3402).
- Glenn Miller & His Orchestra (vocal by Ray Eberle) (1940) – reached No. 8 in the Billboard charts.
- Dick Jurgens & His Orchestra (vocal by Harry Cool) (1940) - reached No. 10 in the Billboard charts.
- Billy Cotton & His Orchestra (vocal by Alan Breeze) - recorded 27 November 1940.(Decca)(?)
