= Clyde Alves =

Canadian dancer, actor and singer

- Born: Brampton, Ontario, Canada
- Occupation: Performer
- Years active: 2000–present

Clyde Alves is a Canadian dancer, actor and singer. Alves appeared on Broadway in The Music Man in the Susan Stroman revival (2000) as Tommy Djilas, and was nominated for the Fred Astaire Award for Best Male Dancer. He repeated his role in the ABC television special of The Music Man which aired in 2003.

He has also appeared on Broadway in Wicked, Hairspray, Oklahoma! as Jess (2002) and as Mike in the 2008-09 tour of A Chorus Line. Alves also appeared in the Off-Broadway musical Boobs! The Musical and Altar Boyz as Juan. Alves was in the Tony winning revival of Anything Goes with Sutton Foster and Joel Grey. He starred in the 2014 Broadway revival of On The Town, and is part of the original cast of the Broadway musical Schmigadoon!. He is married to Robyn Hurder.

== Awards and nominations ==
Year	Award	Category	Work	Result
2015	On The Town	Astaire Award	Best Male Dancer	Nominated
