= Henry Rox =

German-American sculptor and photographer (1899–1967)

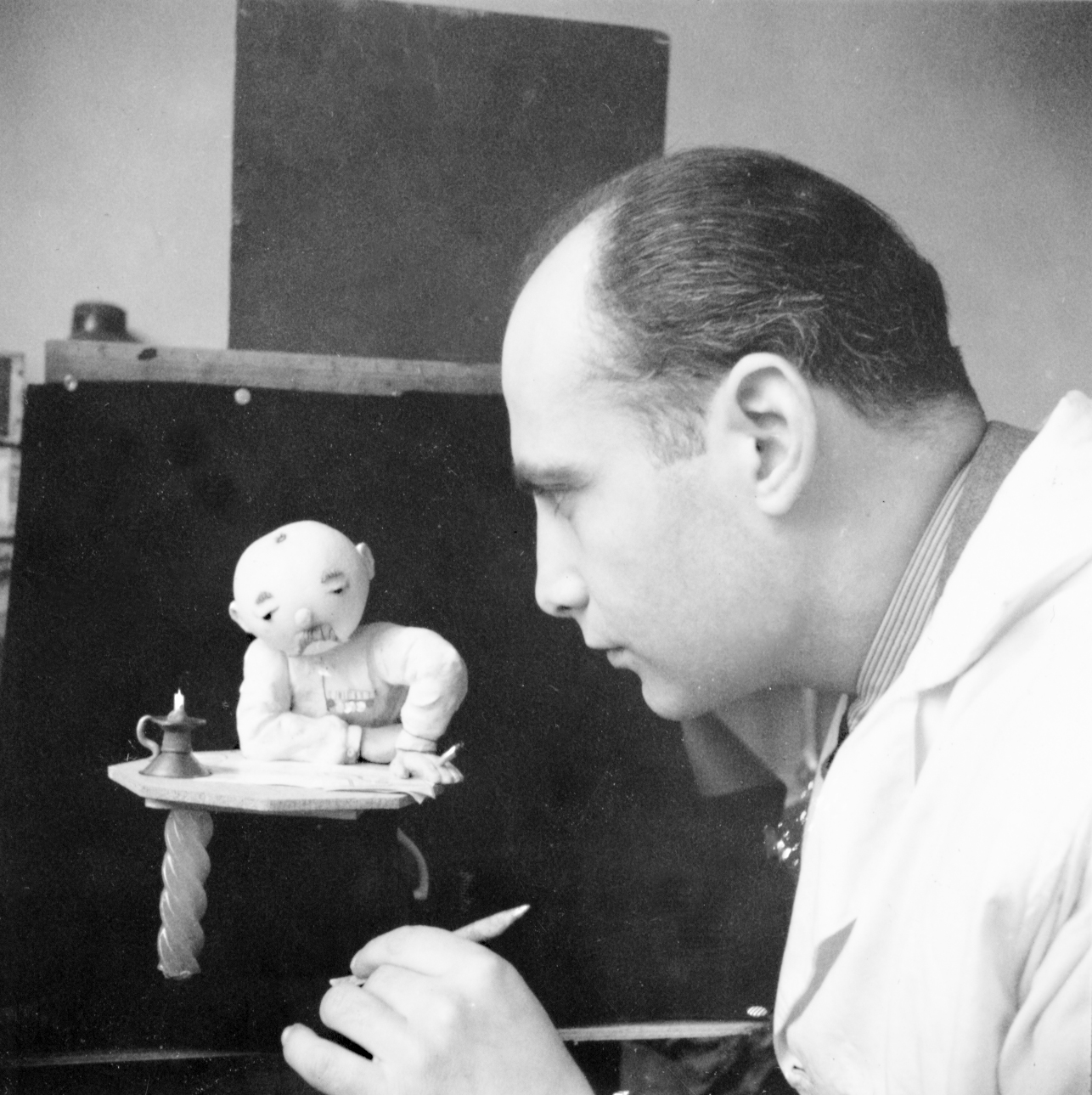
Henry Rox, c. 1940

Henry Rox, born Heinrich Rosenberg (18 March 1899 - 14 July 1967), was a German-Jewish American artist, sculptor, photographer and university teacher.

== Life ==
Henry Rox was born in 1899 in Berlin, the son of the textile merchant Gustav Rosenberg and his wife Zippora, a wealthy Jewish couple from Poland who ran a business for fashion accessories in Berlin. After attending the Hohenzollern-Gymnasium in Berlin-Schöneberg (today Gustav Langenscheidt School) until completing his Abitur in 1917, he served in the First World War on the Western Front (1917/18) and was awarded the Iron Cross, Second Class. From 1920 he studied art history at the University of Berlin, sculpture at the Berlin-Charlottenburg School of Arts and Crafts, and attended the sculpture class at the Académie Julian in Paris. In 1933 he attended a (private) photography school in Berlin.

In 1927 he married Charlotte Fleck (22 April 1898 – 6 March 1971); thereafter they used the names Heinz and Lotte Rosenberg-Fleck. In 1934 both left Germany, lived in London for four years, and adopted the names Henry and Lotte Rox. In 1938 they emigrated to New York, and from 1939 Henry Rox worked as a lecturer in sculpture and art history at Mount Holyoke College in South Hadley, a women's college. In 1948 he was appointed Assistant Professor, and Henry and Lotte Rox obtained American citizenship. In 1954 he was promoted to Professor of Art at Mount Holyoke College and received a Guggenheim Fellowship for a trip to Europe. Rox retired in 1964; he died in 1967 in South Hadley, Massachusetts, United States.

== Work ==
Henry Rox created sculptural works first in Berlin (as Heinrich Rosenberg-Fleck) and then, from 1940 onward, in the United States, working in terracotta, wood, and metal. He produced representations of human figures including portraits – for example of Friedrich Dessauer –, busts, and full figures. His style was realistic with subtle expressionist elements. His works were exhibited throughout America and received awards.

While in London, Rox had only very limited space, so he was unable to work in his usual media. He built anthropomorphized fruit and produce scenes on his kitchen table, which he photographed in a studio. These black-and-white and color photographs were described as humorous and full of esprit, and he was able to illustrate several (children's/young adult) books with them: "Tommy Apple and his Adventures in Banana-Land" [1935], "Banana Circus" [1940]. The photographs were published in well-known magazines and illustrated periodicals, primarily in the United States – Life, Harper's Bazaar, Vogue, Family Circle, Graphis Magazine, Detroit Free Press, among others. For the musical film "Strike Up the Band" (1940), starring Judy Garland and Mickey Rooney, he constructed an entire animated fruit orchestra. Henry Rox taught sculpture at Mount Holyoke College in South Hadley for more than 25 years and mentored students artistically there, including the performance and video artist Joan Jonas.

Henry Rox, nicknamed "the King of Kitsch", was "a prolific but also very discreet artist, the vast majority of [his] work had fallen into oblivion." Cologne photographer and collector Wolfgang Vollmer has been particularly committed to the rediscovery of Henry Rox's photographic work: he researched Rox's life and work and manages part of the estate. In 2021, Fotohof, as part of an exhibition by Wolfgang Vollmer, also presented works by Henry Rox and published a book of his photographic works.

== Publications ==
- James Laver, Henry Rox (Illu.), Tommy Apple and his Adventures in Banana-Land, Jonathan Cape Ltd., London, 1935
- James Laver, Henry Rox (Illu.), Tommy Apple and Peggy Pear, Jonathan Cape Ltd. London, 1936
- Henry Rox, Margaret Fisher, Banana Circus, G. P. Putnam's Sons, New York, 1940
- Henry Rox, Margaret Fisher, Banana Circus, Hammond, Hammond & Comp. Ltd, London, 1943

=== Posthumous ===
- 2020: Henry Rox Revue, Wolfgang Vollmer, FOTOHOF>EDITION, ISBN 978-3-902993-97-7
