= Concert for the Americas =

1982 music festival in the Dominican Republic

The Concert for the Americas was a music festival held on August 20, 1982, in the Dominican Republic at the Altos de Chavón Amphitheater, a 5,000-seat, open-air Greek-style venue located approximately two hours east of Santo Domingo. It was the amphitheater's inaugural event, with performers including Frank Sinatra with Buddy Rich, Heart, and Santana. Santana's set was cut short due to inclement weather.

== Recordings ==
Charles Bluhdorn, whose Gulf+Western owned both the Altos de Chavón and Paramount Pictures, had Paramount record the concert so it could be rebroadcast worldwide. The concert was played on Showtime and featured a Grucci Fireworks grand finale. The video recordings of the Frank Sinatra and Buddy Rich set and Heart's performance were later released commercially. The Sinatra set was broadcast twice on A&E, with a different extended number by Buddy Rich and his orchestra in each showing, his "West Side Story" piece and an unannounced one. Only the former is included in the CD and video released under Sinatra's name. (Personal video tape copies of the two broadcasts.)

== Setlists ==
=== Frank Sinatra / Buddy Rich ===
- Introduction
- "I've Got the World on a String"
- "I Get a Kick Out of You"
- "Come Rain or Come Shine"
- "When Your Lover Has Gone"
- "The Lady is a Tramp"
- Sinatra speaks about America
- "The House I Live In"
- Buddy Rich - Prologue / "Jet Song" (from West Side Story)
- "Searching"
- "My Kind of Town"
- "Something"
- "The Best is Yet to Come"
- "Strangers in the Night"
- "All or Nothing at All"
- Band introductions
- "The Gal That Got Away" / "It Never Entered My Mind"
- "I've Got You Under My Skin"
- "Send in The Clowns" (featuring Tony Mottola on guitar)
- "Quiet Night of Quiet Stars" (featuring Tony Mottola on guitar)
- "I Won't Dance"
- "Theme from New York, New York" (with New York, New York (On the Town) as the verse)

Personnel

- Frank Sinatra - Vocals
- Vincent Falcone Jr. - Conductor, Piano
- Gene Cherico - Bass
- Tony Mottola - Guitar
- Irv Cottler - Drums
- Featuring Buddy Rich and His Orchestra

=== Heart ===
- "Crazy On You"
- "Raised On You"
- "This Man of Mine"
- "Straight On"
- "Magic Man"
- "Tell It Like It Is"
- "Dog & Butterfly"
- "The Situation"
- "Even It Up"
- "Barracuda"
- "Rock & Roll"

=== Santana ===
- "All I Ever Wanted"
- "Primera Invasion" / "Searchin'"
- "Black Magic Woman" / "Gypsy Queen"

== Other "Concerts for the Americas" ==
- On October 20, 2001, the Concert for New York City took place at Madison Square Garden in Manhattan. This performance was occasionally referred to as the "Concert for the Americas".
- February 22, 2002 — Hoffman Auditorium, The Carol Autorino Center at St. Joseph College in West Hartford, Connecticut. Performers included Lorena Garay.
- October 4, 2005 — Minsky Recital Hall at the University of Maine. Performers included Augusto Bertado Cocotl playing violin, accompanied by Ginger Yang Hwalek on piano.
