= Silk Stockings (1957 film) =

1957 film by Rouben Mamoulian

- Theatrical release poster
- Directed by: Rouben Mamoulian
- Screenplay by: Leonard Gershe; Leonard Spigelgass; Harry Kurnitz (uncredited)
- Based on: Silk Stockings; 1955 musical by: George S. Kaufman; Leueen MacGrath; Abe Burrows
- Produced by: Arthur Freed
- Starring: Fred Astaire; Cyd Charisse; Janis Paige; Peter Lorre; Jules Munshin; George Tobias; Joseph Buloff
- Cinematography: Robert J. Bronner
- Edited by: Harold F. Kress
- Music by: Cole Porter; Conrad Salinger (uncredited)
- Distributed by: Metro-Goldwyn-Mayer
- Release date: July 18, 1957 (U.S.)
- Running time: 117 minutes
- Country: United States
- Language: English
- Budget: $2.6 million
- Box office: $2.8 million

Silk Stockings is a 1957 American musical romantic comedy film directed by Rouben Mamoulian and starring Fred Astaire and Cyd Charisse. It is based on the 1955 stage musical of the same name, which had been adapted from the film Ninotchka (1939).

The film received Golden Globe Award nominations for Best Film and Best Actress (Charisse) in the Comedy/Musical category.

The score was embellished with the new song "The Ritz Roll and Rock", a parody of the emerging rock and roll music genre. The number ends with Astaire symbolically smashing his top hat, considered one of his trademarks, signaling his retirement from movie musicals that he announced following the film's release.

== Plot ==
In Paris, American producer Steve Canfield wants Russian composer Peter Ilyitch Boroff to compose the score for his next picture. Three Soviet commissars Brankov, Bibinski, and Ivanov attempt to escort the composer back to Russia. To keep Boroff in Paris, Steve contests the composer's Russian citizenship by producing an affidavit disputing his parentage and insists it be resolved in court. Steve further convinces the commissars that Boroff's collaboration will earn them promotions in Moscow. Despite their initial resistance, the commissars consent to the collaboration.

Back in Moscow, Vassili Markovitch becomes the new commissar of art. He sends Russian agent Nina "Ninotchka" Yoschenko to retrieve Boroff from Paris. She meets the commissars in the hotel lobby. In their suite, Steve shows Ninotchka the affidavit and attempts to charm her with the locale, but Ninotchka insists that she will not be persuaded by the city's bourgeois.

Later that night, Hollywood actress Peggy Dayton arrives at the hotel, where several reporters interview her about her first serious role in an adaptation of War and Peace. The next morning, Steve escorts Ninotchka on a tour of Paris, alternating between boiler rooms and beauty salons. When they return to his hotel room, Steve sets a romantic mood with lower lights and music, but Ninotchka insists that romantic attraction is purely "electro-chemical". Steve and Ninotchka contrast their beliefs on romantic attraction, and after a waltz around the room, the two kiss.

Peggy walks into the room and insults Boroff, causing Ninotchka to leave. She tries to back out of the project because it is not a musical, to which Steve suggests she seduce Boroff into adapting his music to sound contemporary. At a costume fitting, Boroff, who is infatuated with Peggy, initially refuses to musicalize his compositions, but accepts the idea. Later that afternoon, Ninotchka locks herself in her room and dresses in Parisian lingerie. The same night, Ninotchka, dressed in a silky evening gown, joins Steve for a romantic evening. When Ninotchka returns to the commissars' room, they confess that Boroff's "Ode to a Tractor" is being rewritten into popular music for the film. Contrary to their suspicions, Ninotchka is delighted by the idea and dismisses them.

Alone with Steve, Ninotchka raves about Paris' beauty, convinced that love, not utilitarianism, leads to happiness. The next day, on a soundstage, Steve confesses to Ninotchka the affidavit was faked, and proposes to her. Swept away by their love, the two dance from one stage to another, finally arriving on set. As Peggy begins singing Boroff's revised music, he and Ninotchka are insulted by the changes. Steve defends it, asserting that Americans make popular songs out of classical music for audiences to enjoy. Angered, Ninotchka tells Steve that she is neglecting her duty and decides to return to Russia immediately with Boroff and the commissars.

Months later, Boroff and the commissars, who have been saved from punishment by Ninotchka's report, visit her at her apartment. Ninotchka attempts to read Steve's letter, which has been so heavily censored that only the salutation remains. Soon after, Boroff, now fascinated with Western music, plays his new composition on the piano, prompting Ninotchka, the commissars, and the tenants to dance. Shortly after, Markovitch sends Ninotchka back to Paris to retrieve the commissars, who have been sent there to sell Russian films. When she arrives, the commissars take Ninotchka to their new Russian café, where Steve performs a top hat routine.

Back at the hotel room, Ninotchka states she will return to Russia that night. Steve arrives in the room, revealing that he wrote the anonymous report in order to get her out of Russia. He also reminds her of the marriage proposal contained in his censored letter. In love, Ninotchka rips up her plane ticket and embraces him while the commissars celebrate.

== Cast ==
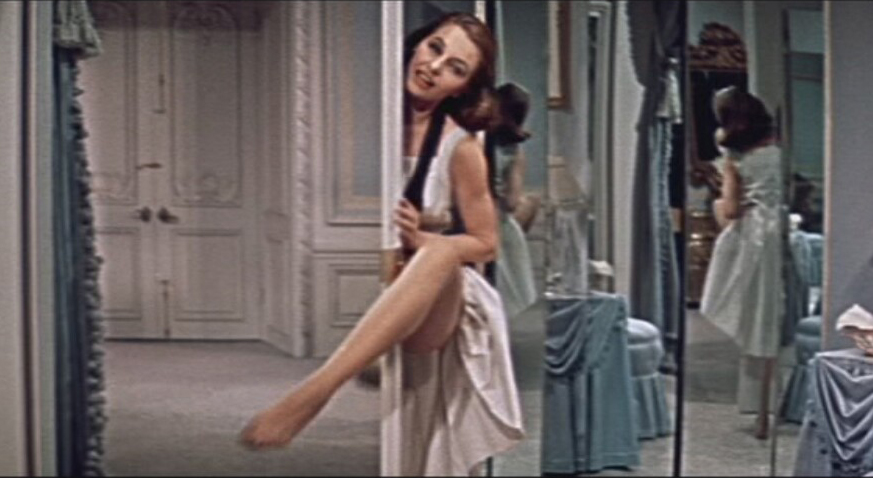
Cyd Charisse as Ninotchka Yoschenko

- Fred Astaire as Steve Canfield
- Cyd Charisse as Ninotchka Yoschenko
- Janis Paige as Peggy Dayton
- Peter Lorre as Brankov
- Jules Munshin as Bibinski
- Joseph Buloff as Ivanov
- George Tobias as Vassili Markovitch, Commisar of Art
- Wim Sonneveld as Peter Ilyitch Boroff

== Songs ==
Music and lyrics by Cole Porter.

- "Too Bad"
- "Paris Loves Lovers"
- "Stereophonic Sound"
- "It's a Chemical Reaction, That's All"
- "All of You"
- "Satin and Silk"
- "Without Love"
- "Fated to Be Mated"
- "Josephine"
- "Siberia"
- "The Red Blues"
- "The Ritz Roll and Rock"

== Production ==
The musical Silk Stockings originated from Melchior Lengyel's story Ninotchka, which in turn was adapted into a 1939 film starring Greta Garbo. The musical premiered on Broadway in 1955, and during its run, producer Arthur Freed decided to acquire the screen rights, making it his first independent film project. He stipulated with MGM's parent company Loews Incorporation a 25 percent ownership stake with the films he produced with MGM's financing. Since MGM held the right of first refusal as it had owned the 1939 film, Freed purchased the rights for $300,000.

To write the screenplay, Freed hired Leonard Spigelgass. As the script was being written, Freed selected Rouben Mamoulian to direct Silk Stockings, having previously worked with him on Summer Holiday (1948). This was Mamoulian's first film in almost a decade, during which he had returned to Broadway to restage a revival of Rodgers and Hammerstein's Oklahoma! (1943), and produced two other musicals and a play. Mamoulian was displeased with Spigelgass's first draft and added outlines of the scenes he had wanted. After a few more drafts, Spigelgass was taken off the project, and Harry Kurnitz was hired to revise the script. Kurnitz's drafts were also unsatisfactory, and Freed later hired Leonard Gershe to complete the script one month before filming.

Cyd Charisse, best known for her performance in Brigadoon (1954), was the first to be cast. Bing Crosby and Howard Keel were considered to star opposite of Charisse. When deciding what her next films would be under her MGM contract, Freed allowed Charisse to choose between starring with Gene Kelly in Les Girls (1957) or with Fred Astaire in Silk Stockings. She declared no contest, and chose Astaire. At the time, Astaire had finished filming Funny Face (1957). He met with Freed at his San Diego ranch though he was ambivalent at accepting the role as he felt too old. Mamoulian met with Astaire at a luncheon, and after hearing Mamoulian's ideas for the film, Astaire agreed to do the film. Astaire worked with his frequent collaborator Hermes Pan on the choreography, and asked Cole Porter to compose a rock and roll number intended to prove he was still in touch with contemporary music. Porter listened to the appropriate records, and returned with the number "The Ritz Roll and Rock."

Freed had promised Ann Miller the role as Peggy Dayton, which had been a role she previously sought in the Broadway musical but ultimately was unable to accept due to scheduling conflicts. When Miller arrived for a costume test at MGM, she discovered Freed had already cast Janis Paige as Peggy Dayton.

In his vision for Silk Stockings, Mamoulian was determined that the film would rely less on dialogue and instead dramatize the relationship between the two leads through elaborate dance numbers. He explained, "I had two of the best dancers in the world, and what interested me was to give greater importance to the dancing than to the action proper, which was merely a repeat of Ninotchka. The psychological and dramatic development existed only in the dances."

Principal photography began on November 7, 1956, and wrapped on January 31, 1957.

== Reception ==
=== Box office ===
According to MGM records, the film earned $1,740,000 in the U.S. and Canada and $1,060,000 in other markets, resulting in a loss of $1,399,000.

=== Critical reaction ===
Bosley Crowther of The New York Times wrote: "There should be legislation requiring that Fred Astaire and Cyd Charisse appear together in a musical picture at least once every two years. Previously they were together in 'The Band Wagon' and the world was brightened. That was away back in 1953. Now they are together in 'Silk Stockings,' and somebody should declare a holiday ... For the simple fact is that this 'Silk Stockings' is an all-round refreshing show, blessed with a bright book, delicious music and the dancing of Miss Charisse and Mr. Astaire. Whether it would be as good without them—without the two principals, that is—is a purely subversive speculation. They are in it, and you can take it from there." Harrison's Reports felt the story "is not as mirthful as the original and its running time is somewhat overlong, but on the whole it keeps one chuckling throughout and has some very funny moments."

Whitney Williams of Variety wrote: "Astaire delivers his customary style, and Miss Charisse brings a fascinating brightness to her role. Miss Paige shares top honors with the stars for a knock-'em-dead type of performance", but felt the film could have been shorter. Edwin Schallert of the Los Angeles Times felt the film has "the benefit of delightful and clever Cole Porter music derived from the stage version"; he further praised the cast writing "Astaire, Miss Charisse and Miss Paige are evidently ready, willing and able to avail themselves of every opportunity presented. As one of the trio of Soviet Ambassadors Jules Munshin maintains a high pace of humor, with Peter Lorre providing hilarious counterpoint and Joseph Buloff supplying some antic fun."

On the review aggregate website Rotten Tomatoes, the film has an aggregate score of 100% based on five critics' reviews, with an average of 7.9/10.

== Retrospective appraisal ==
Film historian Tom Milne observed that even if Silk Stockings is not a facsimile of Cole Porter's Broadway production of Silk Stockings (1955) or Ernst Lubitsch's Ninotchka, Mamoulian improved on these versions by giving it an emotional depth in line with the originals. Milne continued:

Silk Stockings is so crammed with delights that it seems incredible that anybody, let alone the entire pack of British critics, should have failed to respond. The catalog is endless...Perhaps, one day, critics, historians, and those who write about cinema will at last realize that is one of the great musicals."

Film historian Marc Spergel noted that Mamoulian's reputation with Hollywood executives had risen with Silk Stockings, writing: "Audiences and critics praised the film as an inventive, enjoyable entertainment, and Mamoulian restored his value as a marketable commodity."

== See also ==
- List of American films of 1957

== Sources ==
- Freeland, Michael (1976). Fred Astaire: An Illustrated Biography. Grosset & Dunlap. ISBN 0-448-14080-2.
- Fordin, Hugh (1996) [1975]. M-G-M's Greatest Musicals: The Arthur Freed Unit. New York: Da Capo Press. ISBN 978-0-306-80730-5.
- Jensen, Kurt (2024). Peerless: Rouben Mamoulian, Hollywood, and Broadway. University of Wisconsin Press. ISBN 978-0-299-34820-5.
- Milne, Tom (1970). Rouben Mamoulian. Bloomington: Indiana University Press. ISBN 978-0-253-15015-8.
- Spergel, Mark (1993). Slide, Anthony (ed.). Reinventing Reality: The Art and Life of Rouben Mamoulian. The Scarecrow Press. ISBN 0-8108-2721-2.
