= Strike Up the Band (film) =

1940 American musical film by Busby Berkeley

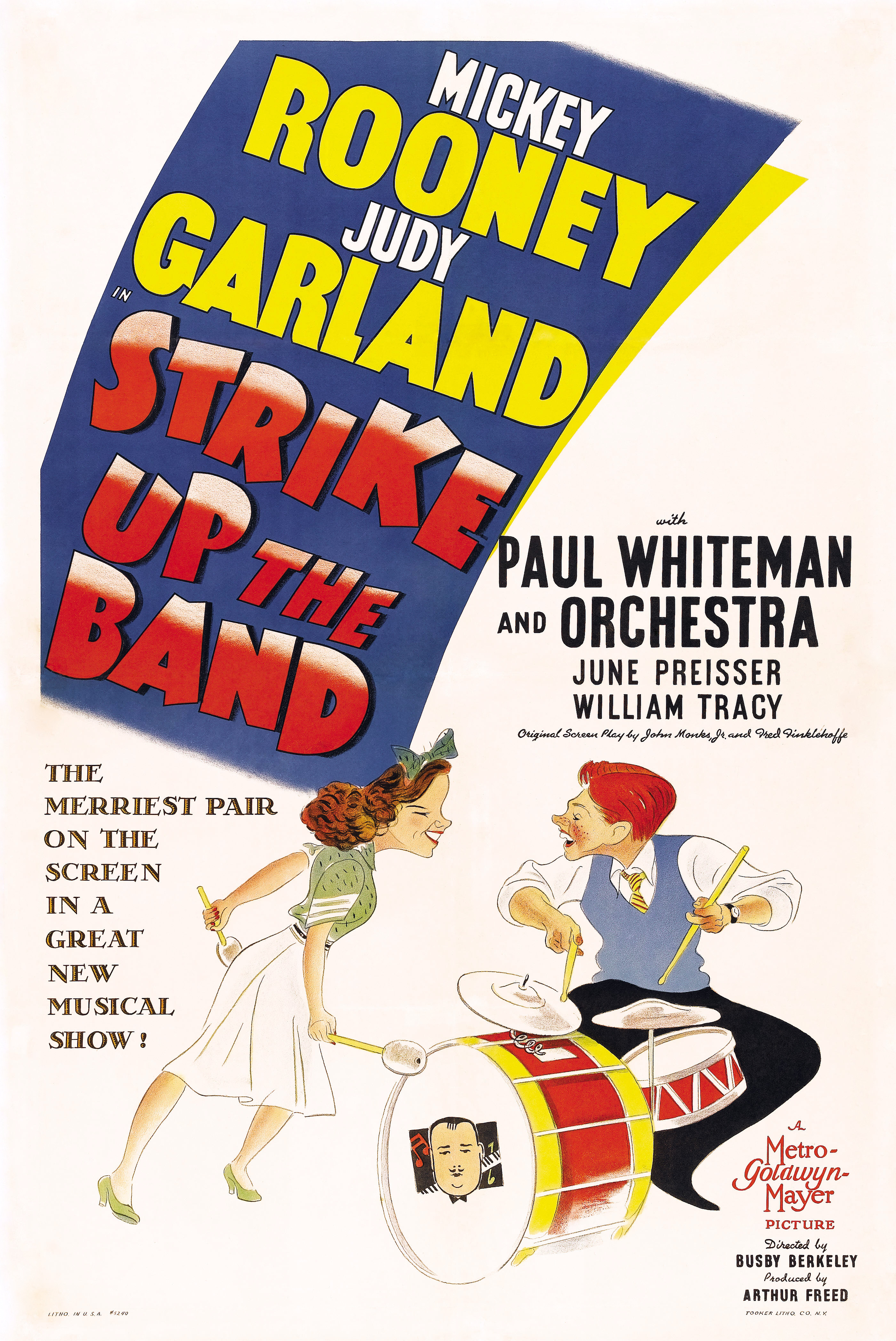
- Theatrical release poster
- Directed by: Busby Berkeley
- Screenplay by: John Monks Jr. Fred Finklehoffe
- Produced by: Arthur Freed
- Starring: Mickey Rooney; Judy Garland
- Cinematography: Ray June
- Edited by: Ben Lewis
- Music by: Roger Edens
- Production company: Metro-Goldwyn-Mayer
- Distributed by: Loew's, Inc.
- Release dates: September 25, 1940 (New York City); September 27, 1940
- Running time: 120 minutes
- Country: United States
- Language: English
- Budget: $854,000
- Box office: $3,494,000

Strike Up the Band is a 1940 American musical film produced by the Arthur Freed unit at Metro-Goldwyn-Mayer. The film was directed by Busby Berkeley and stars Mickey Rooney and Judy Garland, in the second of a series of musicals they co-starred in, after Babes in Arms, all directed by Berkeley. The story written for the 1927 stage musical Strike Up the Band, and its successful 1930 Broadway revision, bear no resemblance to this film, aside from the title song.

== Plot ==
Jimmy Connors, a student at Riverwood High School, is the drummer in the school brass band but dreams of playing in a dance orchestra. After school, Jimmy convinces his friend Mary Holden to be a vocalist. Late one night, Jimmy persuades Mr. Judd, the school principal, on the idea of forming a dance orchestra. Mr. Judd is reluctant due to the school being in debt, and unable to pay for the instruments. However, he allows Jimmy three weeks to organize the dance to raise money. The event is a success, and the school's debt for the instruments is paid off. Back at home, Jimmy has been reluctant to tell his mother his aspirations to be a dance conductor. Mrs. Connors, who had wanted Jimmy to be a doctor, allows her son to pursue his dream.

Afterwards, Jimmy learns that famed band leader Paul Whiteman (played by himself) is sponsoring a contest in Chicago for the best-performing high school musical group, and Jimmy decides that the band must compete. However, Mr. Judd declines the offer. Needing to raise $200 (equivalent to $3,941 in 2025) to pay the traveling expenses, Jimmy decides to put on a show. Meanwhile, Jimmy becomes friends with a new classmate, Barbara Frances Morgan, and decides to attend a local fair with her. He approaches Mary, working at the school library, since they had intended to go together, but she declines.

After the fair, Jimmy and Mary settle on performing Nell from New Rochelle at the Elks Club. The show is another success and raises almost enough money for the band to go to Chicago, though they are still short. After the show, Jimmy goes to Barbara's house and meets her parents. There, he learns that Mr. Morgan has hired Paul Whiteman to perform at Barbara's birthday party.

At the party, Mary notices Willie, a member of the band, is not feeling well. While Whiteman's orchestra is on break, Jimmy, Mary, and the school band perform an impromptu musical number, which impresses Paul that he offers Jimmy a job as an orchestra drummer in New York. Jimmy excitedly tells his mother, who reminds him of his obligation to his friends. Jimmy returns to Paul to decline the offer, which Paul understands. He then advances the fifty dollars to pay the remaining balance for the Chicago trip.

On the day of the trip, Jimmy and Mary learn that Willie has been hospitalized for a fractured arm, which is in immediate need for surgery. The band uses the money so that Jimmy can be flown to Chicago for the operation. Before long, Paul meets with Mr. Morgan, who gives the band a free ride to Chicago aboard his company train. The band competes in Chicago and wins the $500 prize. Jimmy gets the honor of leading all of the bands in a grand finale performance of the title song.

=== Animation ===
Also notable is the short "fruit orchestra" stop motion animated scene, in which a series of puppets with various fruits, nuts, and vegetables for heads appear to play orchestral music. The scene is based on a series of photographs by Henry Rox, published in LIFE magazine, US, December 11, 1939, “Speaking of Pictures ... These Musicians are made of fruit,” pp. 12–15. and was taken by Vincente Minnelli, animated by George Pal, and directed by Busby Berkeley.

== Cast ==
- Mickey Rooney as Jimmy Connors
- Judy Garland as Mary Holden
- Paul Whiteman and Orchestra as themselves
- June Preisser as Barbara Frances Morgan
- William Tracy as Phillip Turner
- Larry Nunn as Willie Brewster
- Margaret Early as Annie
- Ann Shoemaker as Mrs. Connors
- Francis Pierlot as Mr. Judd
- Virginia Brissac as Mrs. May Holden
- George Lessey as Mr. Morgan
- Enid Bennett as Mrs. Morgan
- Howard Hickman as Doctor
- Sarah Edwards as Miss Hodges
- Milton Kibbee as Mr. Holden
- Helen Jerome Eddy as Mrs. Brewster

Uncredited (in order of appearance)
Virginia Sale	Music teacher
Margaret Marquis	Girl in library who asks Mary for Anthony and Cleopatra
Vondell Darr	Girl in library who asks Mary for Indian Love Lyric
Charles Smith	Boy in library who asks Mary for Decline and Fall of the Roman Empire
Henry Roquemore	Mr. Mollison
Sidney Miller	Sid, one of the students
Victoria Vinton	One of the students
Don Castle	Charlie
Joe Yule	Ticket seller at fair
Jack Albertson	Barker at fair
Jack Mulhall	Man on telephone announcing winner of contest

== Songs ==
In keeping with MGM's practice of the time, the film soundtrack was recorded in stereophonic sound but released with conventional monaural sound. At least some of the original stereo recording has survived and been included in some home video releases, including the Mickey Rooney – Judy Garland Collection.

- "Strike up the Band" (1927) – music by George Gershwin, lyrics by Ira Gershwin
  - Played during the opening credits, sung by Judy Garland, Mickey Rooney, and chorus in the final
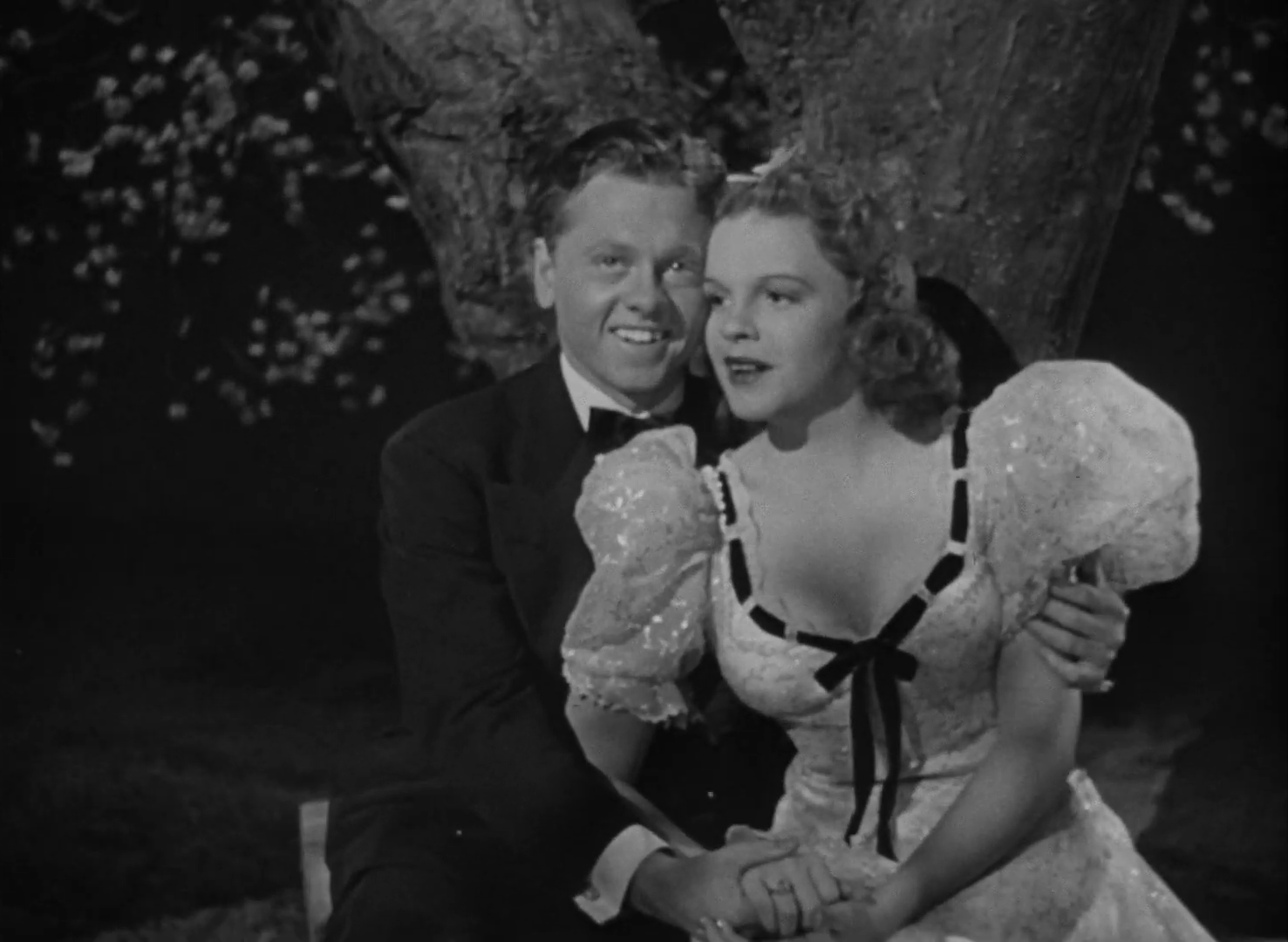
- Garland and Rooney performing "Our Love Affair".
  "Our Love Affair" (1939) – music by Roger Edens, lyrics by Arthur Freed
  - Played during the opening and end credits
  - Played on piano by Mickey Rooney and sung by Judy Garland and Mickey Rooney with orchestral accompaniment
  - Reprised by the animated fruit orchestra
  - Reprised by the band at rehearsal and at the dance
  - Reprised by Judy Garland and Mickey Rooney in the finale
  - Played often as background music
- "Do the La Conga" (1939) – music and lyrics by Roger Edens
  - Performed by Judy Garland, Mickey Rooney, Sidney Miller
  - William Tracy and chorus at the dance
  - Reprised by the cast in the finale
- "Nobody" (1939) – music and lyrics by Roger Edens
  - Sung by Judy Garland
- "Oh Where, Oh Where Has My Little Dog Gone?" (uncredited) – traditional
  - Played as background music at the start of the fair sequence
- "The Gay Nineties" – music and lyrics by Roger Edens
  - Performed by Judy Garland, Mickey Rooney, William Tracy,
  - Margaret Early and chorus at the Elks Club show
- "Nell of New Rochelle" (1939) – music and lyrics by Roger Edens
  - Performed by Judy Garland, Mickey Rooney and chorus in the Elks club show
- "Walking Down Broadway" (uncredited) – traditional, arranged by Roger Edens
  - Sung by the chorus in the "Nell of New Rochelle" sequence
- "A Man Was the Cause of It All" (1939) – music and lyrics by Roger Edens
  - Sung by Judy Garland in the "Nell of New Rochelle" sequence
- "After the Ball" (1891) – music by Charles Harris
  - Played as dance music in the "Nell of New Rochelle" sequence
- "Sobre las olas (Over the Waves)" (1887) (uncredited) – music by Juventino Rosas
  - Played as background music in the "Nell of New Rochelle" sequence
- "Heaven Will Protect the Working Girl" (1909) (uncredited) – music by A. Baldwin Sloane, lyrics by Edgar Smith
  - Sung by Judy Garland, Mickey Rooney and chorus in the "Nell of New Rochelle" sequence
- "Home, Sweet Home" (1823) (uncredited) – music by H.R. Bishop
  - Played as background music when Nell rocks the cradle
- "Ta-ra-ra Boom-de-ay" (1891) (uncredited) – by Henry J. Sayers
  - Danced to and sung by June Preisser and sung by the chorus in the "Nell of New Rochelle" sequence
  - Reprised in the finale of the 'Nell of New Rochelle' sequence
- "Come Home, Father" (1864) (uncredited)' – music and lyrics by Henry Clay Work
  - Sung by Larry Nunn and Judy Garland in the "Nell of New Rochelle" sequence
- "The Light Cavalry Overture" (uncredited) – music by Franz von Suppé
  - Played in the "Nell of New Rochelle" sequence several times
- "Rock-a-Bye Baby" (1886) (uncredited) – music by Effie I. Canning
  - Played as background music when Willie is told to go home
- "Five Foot Two, Eyes of Blue (Has Anybody Seen My Girl?)" (uncredited) – music by Ray Henderson
  - Played as background music when Jimmy and Barbara wait for her parents
- "When Day is Done" (uncredited) – music by Robert Katscher
  - Opening number played by Paul Whiteman and Orchestra at Barbara's party
- "Wonderful One" (uncredited) – music by Paul Whiteman and Ferde Grofé Sr.
  - Played as dance music by Paul Whiteman and Orchestra at Barbara's party
- "Drummer Boy" (1939) – music by Roger Edens, lyrics by Roger Edens and Arthur Freed
  - Performed at Barbara's party by Judy Garland, Mickey Rooney (on drums and vibraphone) and other band members
  - Reprised by the cast in the finale
- "China Boy" (uncredited) – by Dick Winfree and Phil Boutelje
  - Played as background music during the travel and contest montage
- "Hands Across the Table" (1934) (uncredited) – music by Jean Delettre
  - Played as background music during the travel and contest montage
- "Limehouse Blues" (1922) (uncredited) – music by Philip Braham
  - Played as background music during the travel and contest montage
- "Tiger Rag" (1918) (uncredited) – by Edwin B. Edwards, Nick LaRocca, Tony Sbarbaro, Henry Ragas and Larry Shields
  - Played as background music during the travel and contest montage
- "Columbia, the Gem of the Ocean" (1843) (uncredited) – arranged by Thomas A. Beckett
  - Played as background music when the flag is raised at the end

== Reception ==
=== Box office ===
According to MGM records the film earned $2,265,000 in the US and Canada and $1,229,000 elsewhere resulting in a profit of $1,539,000.

=== Critical response ===
Daily Variety:

"While all the young principals do themselves proud, Garland particularly achieves rank as one of the screen's great personalities. Here she is for the first time in the full bloom and charm which is beyond childhood, as versatile in acting as she is excellent in song - a striking figure and a most oomphy one in the wild abandon of the La Conga."

Movie and Radio Guide, 1940:

"The La Conga danced by Mickey Rooney and Judy Garland in Strike Up the Band is nothing less than sensational. For that reason, Movie and Radio Guide hereby christens the number 'The Roogaronga.' This title is a combination of the first three letters of Mickey's and Judy's last names, to which has been added the identifying dance classification."

Variety, September 18, 1940:

"Strike Up the Band is Metro's successor to Babes in Arms with Mickey Rooney, assisted by major trouping on the part of Judy Garland ... Picture is overall smacko entertainment ... and Mickey Rooney teamed with Judy Garland is a wealth of effective entertainment."

== Awards and honors ==
In 1941, the year after the film was released, the film was nominated for three Academy Awards. Douglas Shearer (M-G-M's Sound Director) won a Best Sound, Recording and Roger Edens and George Stoll were nominated for an Oscar in the category of Best Music, Original Song for the song "Our Love Affair". George Stoll and Roger Edens were also nominated for an Oscar in the category of Best Original Score.

The film is recognized by American Film Institute in these lists:

- 2006: AFI's Greatest Movie Musicals – Nominated

== Home media ==
Strike Up the Band was initially released as home media on LaserDisc in 1985 by MGM/UA Home Video, on VHS in 1991 by MGM/UA Home Video, on DVD on September 25, 2007 by Warner Home Video as part of The Mickey Rooney & Judy Garland Collection, it was given an individual DVD release in 2018 and re-issued on Blu-Ray on June 23, 2020 by Warner Archive Collection.

== In popular culture ==
Strike Up the Band is featured in:

- That's Entertainment! (1974)
- Musicals Great Musicals: The Arthur Freed Unit at MGM (1996) (TV)
- Hollywoodism: Jews, Movies and the American Dream (1998) (TV)
- The Sopranos 6th season episode "Cold Stones!".
