= New York, New York (On the Town) =

1944 song composed by Leonard Bernstein

Sheet music for "New York, New York" from On the Town

"New York, New York" is a song from the 1944 musical On the Town and the 1949 musical film of the same name. The music was written by Leonard Bernstein and the lyrics by Betty Comden and Adolph Green.

== Song ==
The song is performed early in act 1 by the sailors Gabey, Chip and Ozzie after they disembark in the Brooklyn Navy Yard, anticipating exciting events during their 24-hour shore leave. It was performed in the New York premiere at the Adelphi Theatre on December 28, 1944, by John Battles (Gabey), Cris Alexander (Chip), and Adolph Green (Ozzie). The performance lasts for about four minutes. The vocal range for the three baritone voices extends from B♭_{2} to G_{4}. The song opens with an orchestral introduction while the sailors disembark. Once on land, they sing the initial line of the chorus, and three verses mixed with spoken dialogue. A well-known line of the chorus is:

New York, New York, a helluva town. The Bronx is up but The Battery's down.

For the film version, the word "helluva" was changed to "wonderful" to appease the Production Code office. In the film, the song was performed by Gene Kelly, Jules Munshin, and Frank Sinatra. In 2004, the film version was ranked No. 41 on AFI's 100 Years...100 Songs survey of top tunes in American cinema. In June 2026, CBS News included the song in its list of the 250 essential American songs of the past 250 years.

The song is not to be confused with the "Theme from New York, New York" ("Start spreadin' the news, I'm leaving today"), originally performed by Liza Minnelli and later popularized by Sinatra. At his 1982 Concert for the Americas performance, Sinatra sang it as an introductory verse to "Theme from New York, New York".

== In popular culture ==
"New York, New York" was referenced by John Williams for his celebratory For New York, composed in 1988 for Bernstein's 70th birthday gala.

The song was parodied as "Springfield, Springfield" in the 1993 episode "Boy-Scoutz 'n the Hood" of The Simpsons. A sailor even appears as another homage to the song, until he realizes he isn't in New York (which Bart points out).

A pastiche of the song titled "Twenty-four Hours in Tunbridge Wells" was written and performed by Eric Idle and Neil Innes, with Gillian Gregory, for an episode of the same name in the second season of the UK comedy series Rutland Weekend Television in 1976.

It was covered in a mash-up with "I Love New York" on the Glee episode "New York".

In the Tim Burton film Sleepy Hollow, Johnny Depp's Ichabod Crane utters "The Bronx is up and the Battery's down" to his traveling party in the final scene.

Alex, Marty, Gloria, and Melman sing the chorus of the song in Madagascar 3: Europe's Most Wanted.

In a sketch performed in the second season of the Australian comedy series The Late Show, Tony Martin, Mick Molloy, and Jason Stephens claim to have holidayed in New York City over the season break, leading to a musical sequence featuring the trio dressed in sailor costumes, miming to "New York, New York", despite the fact that the city they are cavorting in is obviously Melbourne (where The Late Show was filmed).
