= Jess Richards =

American actor

Jess Richards (23 January 1943 – 6 November 1994), born Richard Sederholm, was a Broadway actor as well as performing in many off Broadway shows. He received the Theatre World Award for best actor in a musical for his performance in On the Town in 1971.

== Biography ==
Born Richard Sederholm in 1943, he received a degree in acting from the University of Washington. He was the brother of director and theatre academic Jack Paul Sederholm.

Richards made his Broadway debut in 1966 in Walking Happy, and among his other Broadway credits were roles in Barnum (1980), Blood Red Roses (1970), Mack & Mabel (1974), and Meet Me in St. Louis (1989). His 1971 performance in the musical On The Town won him a Theatre World Award.

He died as a result of AIDS in Indianapolis, Indiana, on 6 November 1994, aged 51.

== Awards and nominations ==
Year	Award	Category	Work	Result
1972	Theatre World Award		On The Town	Won
