= Arthur Freed =

American film producer (1894–1973)

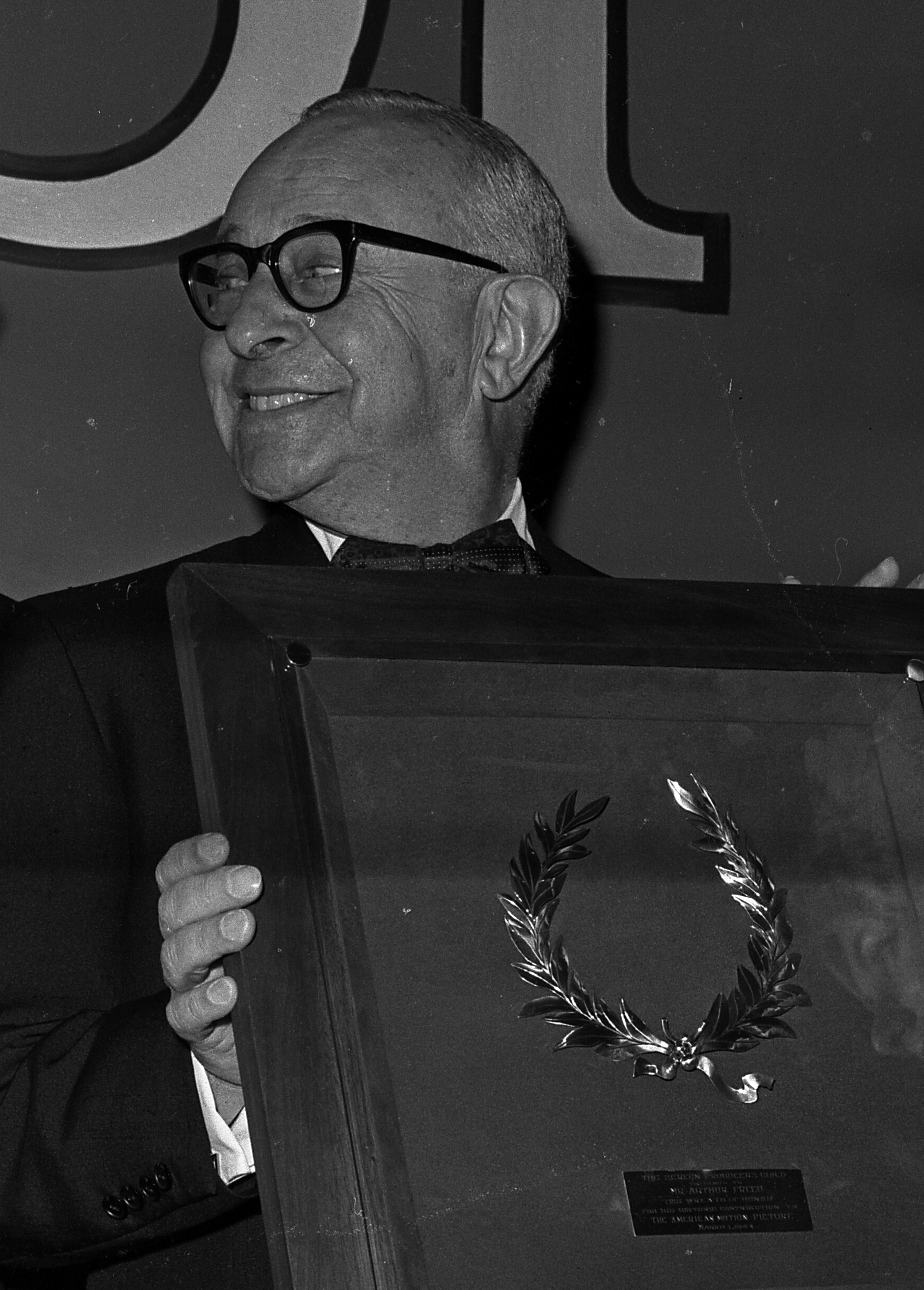
- Freed receiving the Screen Producers Guild's Milestone Award, 1964

Background information
- Born: Arthur Grossman; September 9, 1894; Charleston, South Carolina, United States
- Died: April 12, 1973 (aged 78) Los Angeles, California, United States
- Occupations: Lyricist, film producer

Arthur Freed (né Grossman; September 9, 1894 – April 12, 1973) was an American lyricist and a Hollywood film producer. He won the Academy Award for Best Picture twice, in 1951 for An American in Paris and in 1958 for Gigi. Both films were musicals, and both were directed by Vincente Minnelli. In addition, he produced the film Singin' in the Rain, the soundtrack for which primarily consisted of songs he co-wrote earlier in his career. In the decades following his death, Freed has become the subject of several sexual assault allegations, most notably from child actress Shirley Temple and actress and dancer Barrie Chase.

== Early life ==
Freed was born in Charleston, South Carolina to a Jewish family, and wrote poetry as a high schooler at Phillips Exeter Academy. After graduating in 1914, he began his career as a song-plugger and pianist in Chicago. After meeting Minnie Marx, he sang as part of her sons' act, the Marx Brothers, on the vaudeville circuit and also wrote material for them.

He soon began to write songs, and he was hired by Metro-Goldwyn-Mayer. For years, he wrote lyrics for numerous films, many set to music by Nacio Herb Brown.

== Career ==
In 1939, after working (uncredited) in the role of associate producer on The Wizard of Oz, he was promoted to being the head of his own unit within MGM, and helped elevate the studio to the leading creator of film musicals. His first solo credit as producer was the film version of Rodgers and Hart's smash Broadway musical Babes in Arms (also 1939), released only a few months after The Wizard of Oz. It starred Mickey Rooney and Judy Garland, and it was so successful that it ushered in a long series of "let's put on a show" "backyard" musicals, all starring Rooney and Garland.

Freed brought talent from the Broadway theaters to the MGM soundstages including Vincente Minnelli, Betty Comden, Adolph Green, Roger Edens, Kay Thompson, Zero Mostel, June Allyson, Nancy Walker, Charles Walters, orchestrators Conrad Salinger, Johnny Green, Lennie Hayton, and others including Shirley Temple.

He also helped shape the careers of stars including Gene Kelly, Frank Sinatra, Red Skelton, Lena Horne, Jane Powell, Esther Williams, Kathryn Grayson, Howard Keel, Cyd Charisse, Ann Miller, Vera-Ellen, and others. He brought Fred Astaire to MGM after Astaire's tenure at RKO and coaxed him out of semi-retirement to star with Garland in Easter Parade. His team of writers, directors, composers and stars produced a steady stream of popular, critically acclaimed musicals until the late 1950s.

He allowed his directors and choreographers free rein, something unheard of in those days of committee-produced film musicals, and is credited for furthering the boundaries of film musicals by allowing such moments in films as the fifteen-minute ballet at the end of An American in Paris (1951), after which the film concludes moments later with no more dialogue or songs, and he allowed the musical team of Lerner and Loewe complete control in their writing of Gigi (1958).

According to Hugh Fordin's book The World of Entertainment, Freed did have a hand in the stage-to-screen adaptation of the 1951 Technicolor remake of Kern and Hammerstein's stage classic, Show Boat. It was Freed who disagreed with the original structure of the show's second act, in which more than 20 years pass between most of the act and the final three scenes of the musical. He felt that it made for a lack of drama in the story, and with screenwriter John Lee Mahin, Freed hit upon the idea of having the gambler Gaylord Ravenal leave his wife Magnolia while both are still young and Magnolia is expecting a baby, and then having Julie, the half-black actress who is forced to leave the boat because of her mixed-race background, be the person who brings Ravenal and Magnolia back together again after a separation of only a few years rather than twenty. Also, Freed cast Ava Gardner in the role of Julie.

Two of his films won the Academy Award for Best Picture: An American in Paris and Gigi. On the night that An American in Paris won Best Picture, Freed received an Honorary Oscar, and his version of Show Boat was up for two Oscars that year. The year 1951, in which Freed won the Academy Award for Best Picture for Paris, was the first year that the Academy of Motion Picture Arts and Sciences nominated producers by name rather than by studio. He was the only person nominated for An American in Paris, thus being the first person in the history of the award to win by name rather than by studio. Singin' in the Rain (1952), now his most highly regarded film, won no Oscars. He was inducted into the Songwriters Hall of Fame in 1972.

Freed left MGM in 1961. He served as president of the Academy of Motion Picture Arts and Sciences until leaving in 1966.

== Death ==
Freed died of a heart attack on April 3, 1973.

== Sexual misconduct allegations ==
Shirley Temple wrote in her 1988 autobiography that when she had been 12 in 1940, she was interviewed by Freed, who was age 46, about transferring her career to MGM. She wrote that during the interview, Freed unzipped his trousers and exposed himself to her. According to The New York Times' obituary of Temple, "Being innocent of male anatomy, she responded by giggling, and he threw her out of his office". She also related this account during an October 25, 1988 interview on Larry King Live, further stating that Louis B. Mayer sexually propositioned her mother in an adjacent room during this incident. Temple stated these were the reasons she left MGM after only one film and returned to Fox.

In 2017, actress and dancer Barrie Chase also recounted being the subject of inappropriate conduct by Freed during the mid-1950s.

== Hit songs ==
=== With Nacio Herb Brown ===
- "The Broadway Melody"
- "You Were Meant for Me"
- "Wedding of the Painted Doll"
- "Singin' in the Rain"
- "Pagan Love Song"
- "Should I"
- "Beautiful Girl"
- "Going Hollywood"
- "Temptation"
- "We'll Make Hay While the Sun Shines"
- "Cinderella's Fella Fell off the Cliff"
- "All I Do Is Dream of You"
- "The Hot Choc-late Soldiers"
- "You Are My Lucky Star"
- "I've Got a Feelin' You're Foolin'"
- "Broadway Rhythm"
- "Sing Before Breakfast"
- "Alone"
- "Would You"
- "Yours and Mine"
- "Smoke Dreams"
- "Good Morning"
- "Make 'Em Laugh"

=== With others ===
- "I Cried for You" (with Gus Arnheim and Abe Lyman)
- "Our Love Affair" (with Roger Edens)
- "This Heart of Mine" (with Harry Warren)
- "There's Beauty Everywhere" (with Harry Warren)
- "Here's to the Girls" (with Roger Edens)

== Producing credits ==
- The Wizard of Oz (1939) (associate producer)
- Babes in Arms (1939)
- Strike Up the Band (1940)
- Little Nellie Kelly (1940)
- Lady Be Good (1941)
- Babes on Broadway (1941)
- Panama Hattie (1942)
- For Me and My Gal (1942)
- Cabin in the Sky (1943)
- Best Foot Forward (1943)
- Du Barry Was a Lady (1943)
- Girl Crazy (1943)
- Meet the People (1944) (executive producer)
- Meet Me in St. Louis (1944)
- The Clock (1945)
- Yolanda and the Thief (1945)
- The Harvey Girls (1946)
- Ziegfeld Follies (1946)
- Till the Clouds Roll By (1946)
- Good News (1947)
- Summer Holiday (1948)
- The Pirate (1948)
- Easter Parade (1948)
- Words and Music (1948)
- Take Me Out to the Ball Game (1949)
- The Barkleys of Broadway (1949)
- Any Number Can Play (1949)
- On the Town (1949)
- Annie Get Your Gun (1950)
- Crisis (1950)
- Pagan Love Song (1950)
- Royal Wedding (1951)
- Show Boat (1951)
- An American in Paris (1951)
- The Belle of New York (1952)
- Singin' in the Rain (1952)
- The Band Wagon (1953)
- Brigadoon (1954)
- It's Always Fair Weather (1955)
- Kismet (1955)
- Invitation to the Dance (1956)
- Silk Stockings (1957)
- Gigi (1958)
- Bells Are Ringing (1960)
- The Subterraneans (1960)
- The Light in the Piazza (1962)

Non-profit organization positions
Preceded by Wendell Corey	President of Academy of Motion Pictures, Arts and Sciences; 1963–1967	Succeeded by Gregory Peck
