= Jules Munshin =

American actor, comedian and singer (1915–1970)

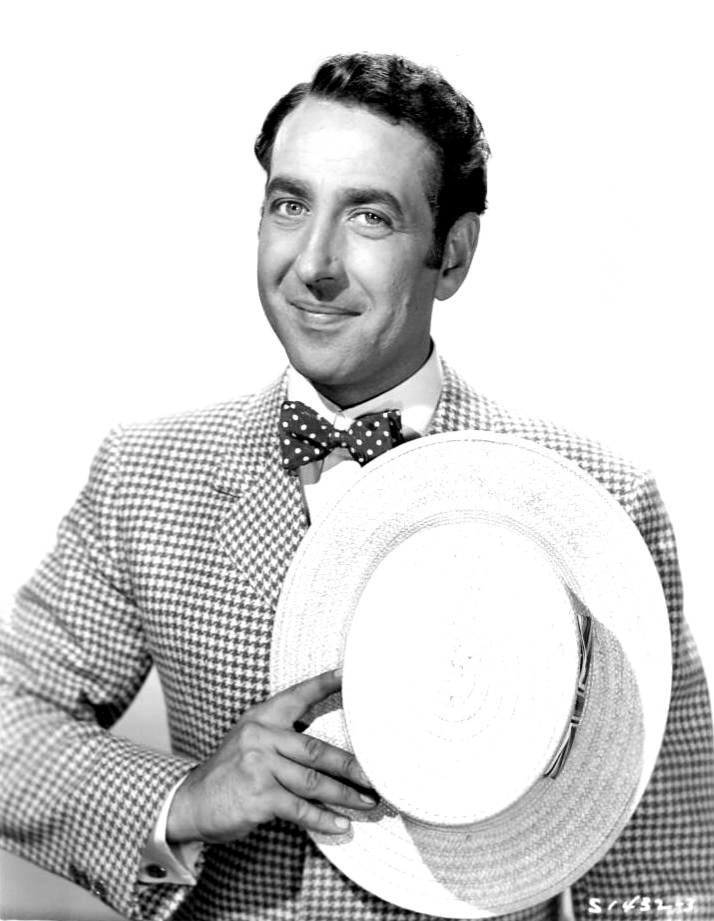
- Munshin in Take Me Out to the Ball Game (1949)
- Born: February 22, 1915; New York City, New York, U.S.
- Died: February 19, 1970 (aged 54); New York City, New York, U.S.
- Resting place: Long Island National Cemetery
- Occupations: Actor; comedian; singer
- Years active: 1942–1969
- Known for: On the Town
- Spouses: Anne Renee Anderson (m. 1943; div. 1962); Bonnie Lynn Pollman (m. 1962)

Jules Munshin (February 22, 1915 – February 19, 1970) was an American actor, comedian and singer who had made his name on Broadway when he starred in Call Me Mister. His additional Broadway credits include The Gay Life and Barefoot in the Park. On screen, he is best remembered for On the Town, in which he co-starred with Frank Sinatra and Gene Kelly as sailors on leave in New York City.

== Early life ==
Munshin was born in New York City and began in show business shortly after graduating from high school. He was Jewish. He worked in Catskill resorts, then vaudeville and was a singer for the George Olsen band. While serving in the U.S. Army during World War II, he played in Army shows such as The Army Play‐by‐Play and About Face, a touring show that featured Joe Louis.

== Career ==
In 1946 he joined the Broadway show Call Me Mister which dealt with the issues that servicemen encountered with return to civilian life. It ran to 734 performances.

In 1948 he moved from Broadway to film. He appeared in such Metro-Goldwyn-Mayer musicals as Easter Parade (1948), Take Me Out to the Ball Game (1949), On the Town (1949) and Silk Stockings (1957).

In August 1958 he appeared at the Aldwych Theatre in London's West End in a run of George Tabori's play Brouhaha with Peter Sellers in the lead role and also featuring Lionel Jeffries. One of the September shows was televised on the BBC. The show, which was directed by Peter Hall, ran until 28 February 1959.

== Death ==
Munshin died in New York City at the age of 54 from a heart attack, three days before his 55th birthday. He is buried in Long Island National Cemetery.

== Filmography ==
Year	Title	Role	Notes
1948	Easter Parade	Headwaiter François	
1949	Take Me Out to the Ball Game	Nat Goldberg	
1949	That Midnight Kiss	Michael Pemberton	
1949	On the Town	Ozzie	Sang "New York, New York"
1951	Nous irons à Monte Carlo	Bullfighter in Musical Melange with Antoine	(cameo appearance), Uncredited
1953	Monte Carlo Baby	Antoine	
1956	G.E. Summer Originals		TV series, Episode "It's Sunny Again"
1957	Ten Thousand Bedrooms	Arthur	
1957	Silk Stockings	Bibinski	
1959	A Christmas Festival	The Manager	TV movie
1960	Summer in New York		TV movie
1960	The Emperor's Clothes		TV movie
1964	Wild and Wonderful	Rousseleau, TV Director	
1967	Monkeys, Go Home!	Monsieur Piastillio	
1969	That Girl	Harry Fields/Rudy Clarn	TV series (2 episodes)
1976	Mastermind	Israeli Agent #1	(final film role, released posthumously)
