= On the Town (film) =

1949 film by Gene Kelly, Stanley Donen

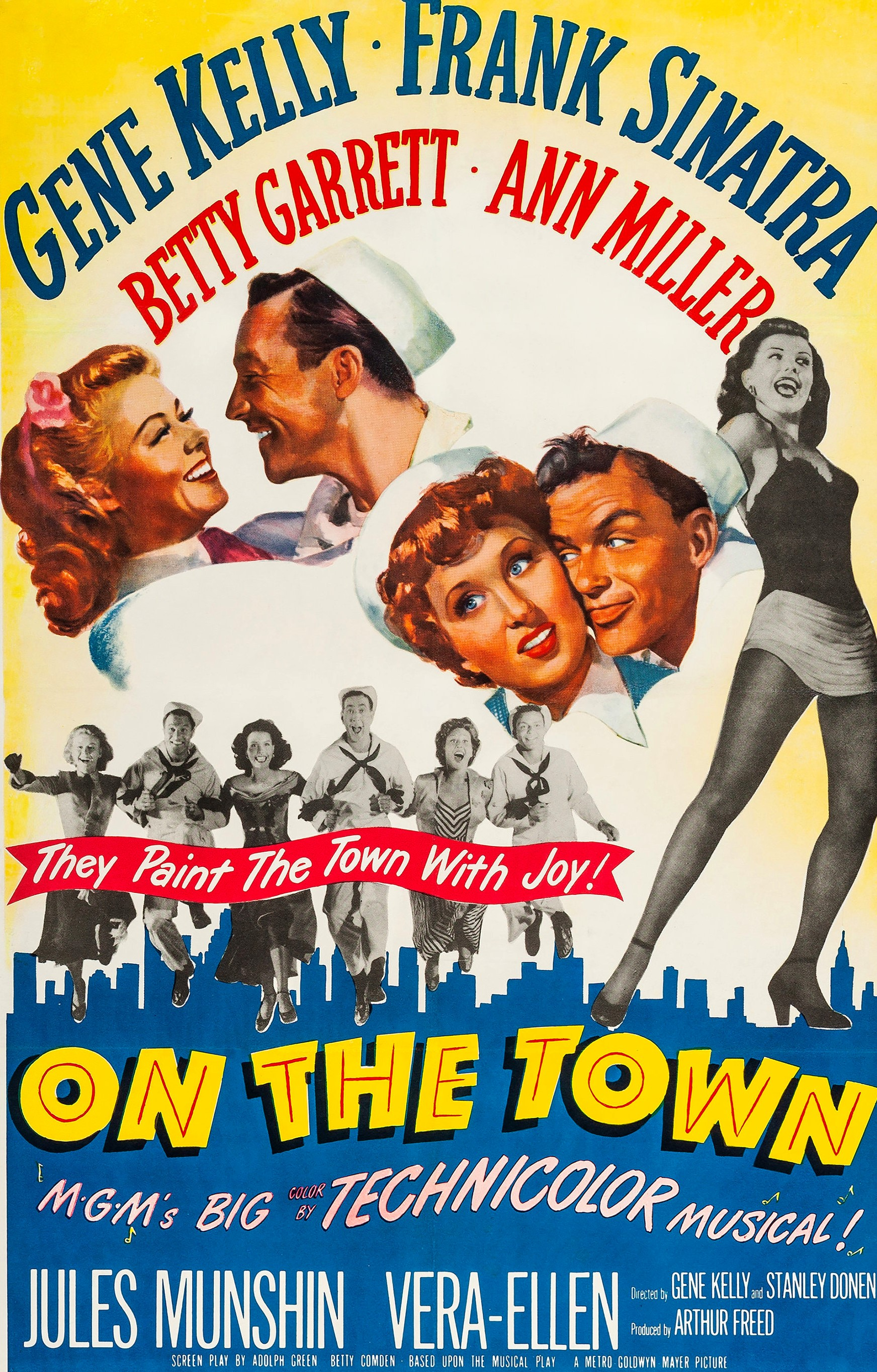
- Theatrical release poster
- Directed by: Gene Kelly; Stanley Donen
- Screenplay by: Adolph Green; Betty Comden
- Based on: Based on an idea by Jerome Robbins; Based on On the Town (1944 stage musical) by Adolph Green, Betty Comden, and Leonard Bernstein
- Produced by: Arthur Freed
- Starring: Gene Kelly; Frank Sinatra; Betty Garrett; Ann Miller; Jules Munshin; Vera-Ellen
- Cinematography: Harold Rosson
- Edited by: Ralph E. Winters
- Music by: Leonard Bernstein; Roger Edens; Lennie Hayton; Adolph Green (lyrics); Betty Comden (lyrics); Conrad Salinger (uncredited)
- Production company: Metro-Goldwyn-Mayer
- Distributed by: Loew's Inc.
- Release date: December 8, 1949 (United States)
- Running time: 98 minutes
- Country: United States
- Language: English
- Budget: $2.1 million
- Box office: $4.4 million

On the Town is a 1949 American Technicolor musical film with music by Leonard Bernstein and Roger Edens and book and lyrics by Betty Comden and Adolph Green. It is an adaptation of the Broadway stage musical of the same name produced in 1944 (which itself is an adaptation of the Jerome Robbins ballet, titled Fancy Free, also produced in 1944), although many changes in the script and score were made to the original stage version; for instance, most of Bernstein's score was dropped in favor of new songs by Edens, who felt that the majority of Bernstein's music was too complex and too operatic for film audiences. This caused Bernstein to boycott the film.

The film was directed by Gene Kelly (who also choreographed) and Stanley Donen, in their directorial debut, and stars Kelly, Frank Sinatra, Betty Garrett, and Ann Miller, featuring Jules Munshin and Vera-Ellen. It was a product of the Arthur Freed unit at Metro-Goldwyn-Mayer and is notable for its combination of studio and location filming, the result of Gene Kelly's insistence that some scenes be shot in New York City, including Columbus Circle, the Brooklyn Bridge, and Rockefeller Center.

The film was an immediate success and won the Oscar for Best Music – Scoring of a Musical Picture. It was also nominated for a Golden Globe Award for Best Cinematography (Color). Screenwriters Comden and Green won the Writers Guild of America Award for Best Written American Musical.

In 2006, the film ranked number 19 on the American Film Institute's list of Best Musicals. In 2018, the film was selected for preservation in the United States National Film Registry by the Library of Congress as being "culturally, historically, or aesthetically significant".

== Plot ==
Three U.S. Navy sailors; best friends Gabey, Chip, and Ozzie begin their shore leave, excited for their 24 hours in New York. While riding the subway, Gabey falls in love with and dreams of the woman in the poster of the monthly "Miss Turnstiles", whose name is Ivy Smith. By chance, she's at the next subway station, and Gabey gets to pose in a promotional photo of her. After she catches the next train, Gabey vows to find her again. The sailors race around New York in a frenzied search, hoping still to have time to sightsee and take dates out to the clubs.

Along the way they are assisted by, and become romantically involved with, two women: Ozzie with Claire, an anthropologist; and Chip with Hildy, an aggressively amorous taxi driver. Claire claims that she's found her passionate "Prehistoric Man" in Ozzie at the Museum of Anthropological History. While dancing, Ozzie accidentally knocks over a dinosaur skeleton and the group flees the museum. They decide to split up in search of Ivy, during which Hildy invites Chip to "Come Up to My Place".

Finally locating Ivy in a dance class, Gabey takes her on an imaginary date to his home town ("Main Street") in a studio in Symphonic Hall. He does not realize that she is from the same small town, for she pretends to be a native New Yorker. Meanwhile, Chip sincerely falls for Hildy and tells her "You're Awful" – that is, awful nice to be with. During the evening, the three couples meet at the top of the Empire State Building to celebrate a night "On the Town".

The couples go to several clubs for a good time. Gabey is still convinced Ivy is a genuine celebrity, so Hildy and Claire bribe a waiter to make a fuss in order to keep up the ruse. When an ashamed Ivy walks out on Gabey to get to her late-night job as a cooch dancer, Gabey is despondent. Hildy has her annoying, but well-meaning roommate, Lucy Schmeeler fill in as his date, but he can't be consoled. The friends lift his spirits by singing "You Can Count on Me". Since Lucy has a bad cold, Gabey drops her off at her apartment and apologizes for having been a lackluster date.

The group eventually reunites with Ivy at Coney Island. Despite her lies being revealed, Gabey doesn't care and is just happy to have found her. Unfortunately the group has been pursued by police for the dinosaur incident. The three men are taken back to their ship, and the women barely talk their way out of a night in jail. Moved by their speeches, the police escort them to the ship just as the sailors' 24-hour shore leave ends. Although their future is uncertain, each couple shares one last kiss on the pier as a new batch of sailors heads out into the city for their leave.

== Cast ==
- Gene Kelly as Gabey
- Frank Sinatra as Chip
- Betty Garrett as Brunhilde "Hildy" Esterhazy
- Ann Miller as Claire Huddesen
- Jules Munshin as Ozzie
- Vera-Ellen as Ivy Smith
- Florence Bates as Madame Dilyovska
- Alice Pearce as Lucy Shmeeler
- George Meader as Professor
- Hans Conried as François (head waiter) (uncredited)
- Sid Melton as Spud (uncredited)
- Murray Alper as Cab owner (uncredited)

Cast notes

- Carol Haney, Gene Kelly's assistant, performed with Kelly in the "Day in New York" ballet sequence, but is not credited. This was Haney's screen debut.
- Mickey Miller is the skill dancer replacing the Jules Munshin Ozzie character in the “Day in New York” ballet sequence, but is not credited.
- Bea Benaderet has an uncredited cameo as a girl from Brooklyn on the subway, her film debut in a speaking role.
- Bern Hoffman has an uncredited role as the shipyard worker who sings the opening song, and reprises it at the end.
- Alice Pearce is the only original member of the Broadway cast to reprise her role.

== Musical numbers ==
1. "I Feel Like I'm Not Out of Bed Yet" – Shipyard worker (from Leonard Bernstein's score)
2. "New York, New York" – Gabey, Chip, and Ozzie (from Bernstein's score)
3. "Miss Turnstiles Ballet" (instrumental) – Ivy and ensemble (from Bernstein's score)
4. "Prehistoric Man" – Claire, Ozzie, Gabey, Chip, and Hildy
5. "Come Up to My Place" – Hildy and Chip (from Bernstein's score)
6. "Main Street" – Gabey and Ivy
7. "You're Awful" – Chip and Hildy
8. "On the Town" – Gabey, Ivy, Chip, Hildy, Ozzie, and Claire
9. "You Can Count on Me" – Gabey, Chip, Ozzie, Hildy, Claire, and Lucy
10. "A Day in New York" (instrumental) – Gabey, Ivy, and dream cast (from Bernstein's score)
11. "I Feel Like I'm Not Out of Bed Yet"/"New York, New York" (reprise) – Shipyard worker, three sailors, and chorus

== Production ==
The film had a budget of $1.5 million, one of MGM's lowest for a Technicolor musical, with a planned filming schedule of just 46 days.

The musical numbers staged on-location in New York were the first time a major studio had accomplished this. The location shots in New York took nine days. Shooting in New York City was Kelly and Donen's idea, which studio head Louis B. Mayer refused to allow, pointing out the studio's excellent New York sets in its backlot. Kelly and Donen held their ground, and Mayer finally relented and allowed a limited number of days shooting in New York. The primary problem experienced by the production was dealing with crowds of Frank Sinatra's fans, so some shots were made with the camera located in a station wagon to reduce the public visibility of the shooting.

The Breen Office of the MPAA refused to allow the use of the word, "helluva", in the song, "New York, New York", so it was changed to "wonderful".

== Reception ==
=== Box office ===
According to MGM records, the film earned $2,934,000 in the US and Canada, and $1,494,000 overseas, resulting in a profit to the studio of $474,000.

=== Critical reception ===
The film was also a critical success, receiving good reviews in various publications, including Variety and The New York Times. On the Town currently holds a 93% rating on Rotten Tomatoes based on thirty reviews with the following consensus: "Overflowing with infectious enthusiasm, On the Town is an exhilarating musical ride across the real streets of New York featuring another graceful performance from Gene Kelly."

=== Awards and honors ===
- Academy Awards, Best Musical Score for Roger Edens and Lennie Hayton, 22nd Academy Awards (won)
- BAFTA Awards, Best Film, 1951 (nominated)
- Golden Globes, Best Cinematography – Color, 1950 (nominated)
- Writers Guild of America, Best Written American Musical, 1950 (won)

American Film Institute
The film is recognized by American Film Institute in these lists:

- 2004: AFI's 100 Years...100 Songs:
  - "New York, New York" – #41
- 2006: AFI's Greatest Movie Musicals – #19

== See also ==
- Arthur Freed
- USS Nicholson, DD-442, the three sailors' ship, which appears in the opening and closing scenes
- List of films featuring dinosaurs
