= Betty Comden =

American dramatist and lyricist (1917–2006)

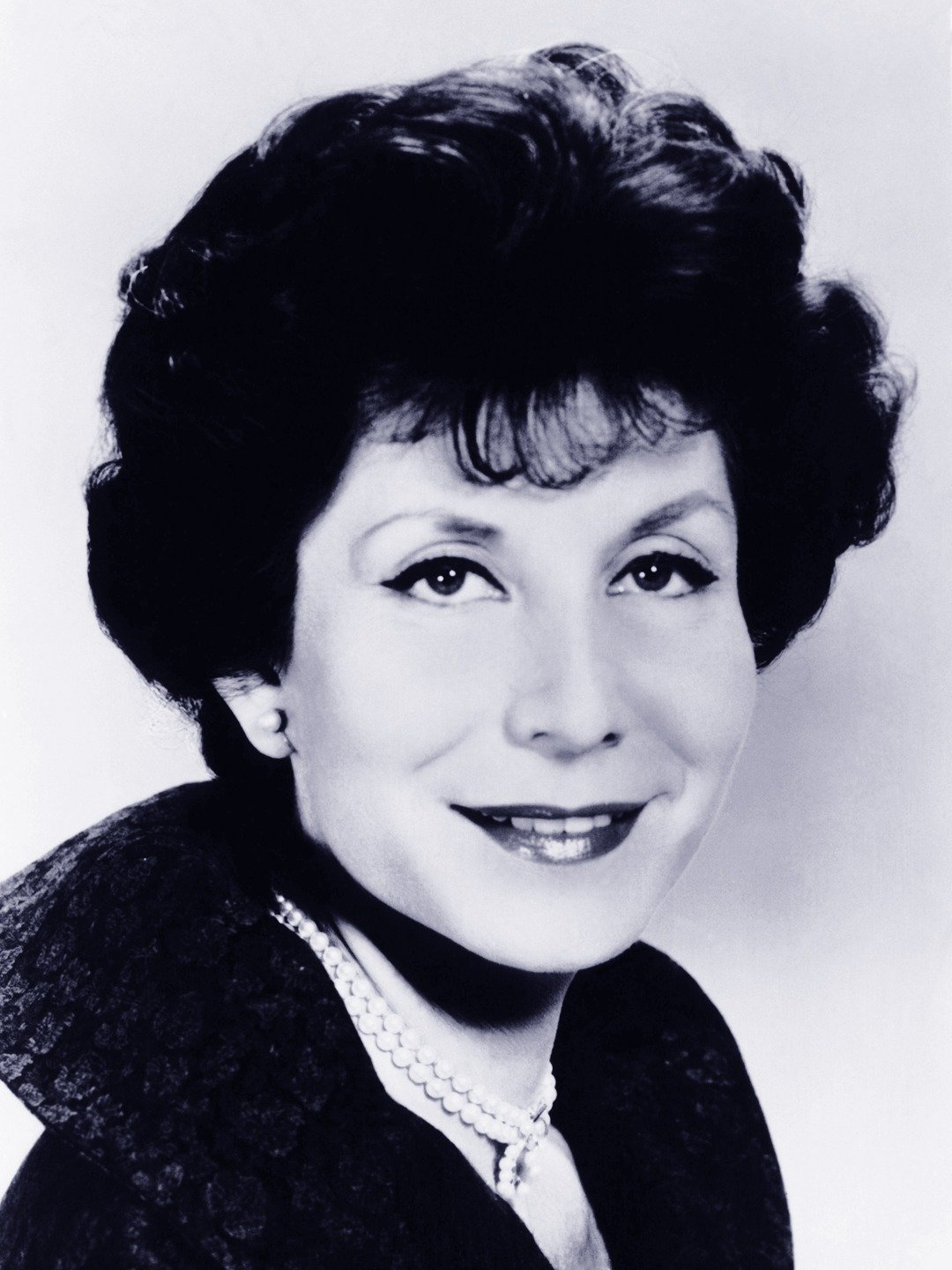
- Comden, c. 1960
- Born: Basya Cohen; May 3, 1917; Brooklyn, New York, U.S.
- Died: November 23, 2006 (aged 89); New York City, New York, U.S.
- Occupations: Actress, librettist, lyricist, screenwriter
- Years active: 1944–2005
- Spouse: Steven Kyle né Siegfried Schutzman (m. 1942; died 1979)
- Children: 2

Betty Comden (May 3, 1917 – November 23, 2006) was an American lyricist, playwright, and screenwriter who contributed to numerous Hollywood musicals and Broadway shows of the mid-20th century. Her writing partnership with Adolph Green spanned six decades: "the longest running creative partnership in theatre history." The musical-comedy duo of Comden and Green collaborated most notably with composers Jule Styne and Leonard Bernstein, as well enjoyed success with Singin' in the Rain, as part of the famed "Freed unit" at Metro-Goldwyn-Mayer.

== Early life ==
Betty Comden was born Basya Cohen in Brooklyn, New York in 1917, the younger child of Leo Cohen (originally Astershinsky), a lawyer, and Rebecca (née Sadvoransky) Cohen, an English teacher. Both were Russian immigrants and observant Jews. She had an older brother, Nathaniel ("Nat"), born c. 1915. Basya "attended Erasmus Hall High School and studied drama at New York University, graduating in 1938," according to The New York Times.

In 1938, mutual friends introduced her to Adolph Green, an aspiring actor. Along with the young Judy Holliday and Leonard Bernstein, Comden and Green formed a troupe called the Revuers, which performed at the Village Vanguard, a club in Greenwich Village. Due to the act's success, the Revuers appeared in the 1944 film Greenwich Village, but their roles were so small they were barely noticed, and they returned to New York.

Comden and Green's first Broadway show was On the Town, a 1944 musical about three sailors on leave in New York City that was an expansion of a ballet entitled Fancy Free on which Bernstein had been working with choreographer Jerome Robbins. Comden and Green wrote the book and lyrics, which included sizable parts for themselves (as "Claire" and "Ozzie"). Their next musical, Billion Dollar Baby in 1945, with music by Morton Gould was not a success, and their 1947 show Bonanza Bound closed out-of-town and never reached Broadway.

== Broadway and film success ==
Comden and Green headed to California and soon found work at MGM. They wrote the screenplays for Good News and The Barkleys of Broadway (which reunited Fred Astaire and Ginger Rogers), and then adapted On the Town for Frank Sinatra and Gene Kelly, scrapping most of Bernstein's music at the request of Arthur Freed, who did not care for the Bernstein score. The duo reunited with Gene Kelly for their most successful project, the classic Singin' in the Rain, about Hollywood in the final days of the silent film era. Comden and Green provided the story and screenplay; the songs were hits from the late 1920s and early 1930s by Arthur Freed and Nacio Herb Brown.

They followed this with another hit, The Band Wagon, in which the characters of Lester and Lily, a husband-and-wife musical-writing team, were patterned after themselves. As with Singin' in the Rain, the real-life team did not write the songs. They were Oscar-nominated twice, for their screenplays for The Band Wagon and It's Always Fair Weather. Both films also received Screen Writers Guild Awards; On the Town did too.

Comden and Green's stage work of the 1950s included Two on the Aisle, starring Bert Lahr and Dolores Gray, with music by Jule Styne; Wonderful Town, a musical adaptation of the play My Sister Eileen, with music by Bernstein; and Bells Are Ringing, which reunited them with Judy Holliday and Jule Styne. The score, including the standards "Just in Time", "Long Before I Knew You", and "The Party's Over", proved to be one of their richest.

The duo contributed additional lyrics to the 1954 musical Peter Pan, translated and streamlined Die Fledermaus for the Metropolitan Opera, and collaborated with Styne on songs for the play-with-music Say, Darling. In 1958, they appeared on Broadway in A Party with Betty Comden and Adolph Green, a revue that included some of their early sketches. It was a critical and commercial success, and they brought an updated version back to Broadway in 1977.

The pair wrote the screenplay for Auntie Mame in 1958. The New York Times movie review from that year lays it out as follows:

In its superficial racing across several strata of rich society, it does catch some glimpses of behavior that flash a few glints of irony. The picture is every bit as potent, if not a good deal more so, than the play. The stage play, as written by Jerome Lawrence and Robert E. Lee from the novel of Patrick Dennis, was more like a movie script in its pile-up of pictorial business and its multiplicity of scenes. The invitation to expansion was hand-engraved in the play. Now it has been accepted by screenwriters Betty Comden and Adolph Green and by the director, Morton DaCosta, who has reveled in the greater physical range.

Comden and Green's Broadway work in the 1960s included four collaborations with Jule Styne. They wrote the lyrics for Do Re Mi, and the book and lyrics for Subways Are For Sleeping, Fade Out – Fade In, and Hallelujah, Baby! Their Hallelujah, Baby! score won a Tony Award.

Comden and Green wrote the libretto for the 1970 musical Applause, an adaptation of the film All About Eve, and wrote the book and lyrics for 1978's On the Twentieth Century, with music by Cy Coleman. Comden also played Letitia Primrose in that musical when original star Imogene Coca left the show. Comden and Green's final musical hit was 1991's The Will Rogers Follies, providing lyrics to Cy Coleman's music. The duo's biggest failure was 1982's A Doll's Life, an attempt to figure out what Nora did after she abandoned her husband in Henrik Ibsen's A Doll's House, which ran for only five performances, although they received Tony Award nominations for its book and score.

In 1980, Comden was inducted into the Songwriters Hall of Fame. And, in 1981, she was inducted into the American Theatre Hall of Fame. In the early 1980s, Comden acted in Wendy Wasserstein's play Isn't It Romantic, portraying the lead character's mother.

In 1984, filmmaker Sidney Lumet directed a film about Greta Garbo, Garbo Talks, starring Anne Bancroft and Ron Silver. The producers of the film were sure that the real Garbo either could not be located or would refuse flatly to appear in a cameo. They asked a known associate of Garbo to ask the great actress if she would appear in the film, but received no response. So, Comden was asked to appear in the film for the brief, pivotal "over-the-shoulder" scenes.

Comden and Green received Kennedy Center Honors in 1991.

In 1994, Comden and Green were guest callers, "Linda" and "Walter", on the long-running sit-com Frasier in the episode entitled "Burying a Grudge."

== Family ==
Comden and Green were a creative partnership, not a romantic couple. In 1942, Comden married Siegfried Schutzman, a designer and businessman, who changed his name to Steven Kyle. He died in 1979 of acute pancreatitis. They had two children, a daughter, Susanna, and a son, Alan, who died in 1990. She never remarried.

== Death ==
Betty Comden died of heart failure following an undisclosed illness of several months at New York Presbyterian Hospital in Manhattan on Thanksgiving Day, November 23, 2006, aged 89. She was buried in Mount Carmel Cemetery in Glendale, New York.

== Awards and nominations ==
Year	Award	Category	Work	Result
1950	WGA Award	Best Written American Musical	The Barkleys of Broadway	Nominated
1950	WGA Award	Best Written American Musical	On the Town	Won
1953	WGA Award	Best Written American Musical	Singin' in the Rain	Won
1953	New York Drama Critics' Circle Award	Best Musical	Wonderful Town	Won
1954	Academy Awards	Best Writing, Story and Screenplay	The Band Wagon	Nominated
1954	WGA Award	Best Written American Musical	The Band Wagon	Nominated
1956	Academy Awards	Best Writing, Story and Screenplay	It's Always Fair Weather	Nominated
1956	WGA Award	Best Written American Musical	It's Always Fair Weather	Nominated
1961	WGA Award	Best Written American Musical	Bells Are Ringing	Won
1961	Grammy Award	Best Soundtrack Album	Bells Are Ringing	Nominated
1968	Tony Award	Best Composer and Lyricist	Hallelujah, Baby!	Won
1978	Tony Award	Best Book of a Musical	On the Twentieth Century	Won
1978	Tony Award	Best Original Score	On the Twentieth Century	Won
1983	Tony Award	Best Book of a Musical	A Doll's Life	Nominated
1983	Tony Award	Best Original Score	A Doll's Life	Nominated
1986	Tony Award	Best Book of a Musical	Singin' in the Rain	Nominated
1991	Tony Award	Best Original Score	The Will Rogers Follies	Won
1991	New York Drama Critics' Circle Award	Best Musical	The Will Rogers Follies	Won
1993	Golden Plate Award of the American Academy of Achievement	The Arts		Won
1995	National Board of Review Award	Distinction in Screenwriting		Won
2001	WGA Award	Laurel Award for Screen Writing Achievement		Won
