= Roger Edens =

American composer (1905–1970)

Roger Edens (November 9, 1905 – July 13, 1970) was a Hollywood composer, arranger and associate producer, and is considered one of the major creative figures in Arthur Freed's musical film production unit at Metro-Goldwyn-Mayer during the "golden era of Hollywood".

== Early career and work with Judy Garland ==
Edens was born in Hillsboro, Texas. His parents were of Scots-Irish ancestry. He was a piano accompanist for ballroom dancers before becoming a musical conductor on Broadway. He went to Hollywood in 1932 along with his protégée Ethel Merman, writing and arranging material for her films at Paramount. In 1935 he joined MGM as a musical supervisor and occasional composer and arranger, notably of music for Judy Garland. He also appeared on screen opposite Eleanor Powell in a cameo in Broadway Melody of 1936.

Arthur Freed, producer of musicals at MGM, was impressed by Edens and soon made him integral to his production team, which was rapidly growing and featured many of the day's greatest talents, recruited by Freed himself. Freed built a cabinet around himself, and in the early 1940s made Edens associate producer. The unit made dozens of extremely successful musical films in the 1940s and into the 1950s, including Meet Me in St. Louis (1944), Easter Parade (1948), On the Town (1949), Show Boat (1951), An American in Paris (1951), Singin' in the Rain (1952) and The Band Wagon (1953).

When musical films became less popular in the mid-1950s, Edens left MGM, opened his own office, and worked on such projects as Funny Face (1957) with Audrey Hepburn, Fred Astaire, and Kay Thompson at Paramount.

Edens is considered an important creative musical figure from the end of the 1930s until the beginning of the 1960s. His MGM career allowed him to work with top musical performers including Judy Garland, of whom he was the original trainer and overseer and a lifelong friend. Special material he wrote for her includes "Dear Mr Gable - You Made Me Love You" (1937); "Our Love Affair" (1940) for Strike up the Band, which received an Oscar nomination for Best Song; and the music for the "Born in a Trunk" sequence in A Star Is Born (1954). "It's a Great Day for the Irish", which Garland sang in Little Nellie Kelly (1940) and was one of her biggest hits, became an Irish-American anthem played by military and marching bands every St. Patrick's Day the world over.

Edens produced a number of films after the mid-1950s, and wrote special material for Garland's Palace Theatre debut in 1951 and her London Palladium concerts the same year.

== Birthday parties ==
Edens and Kay Thompson had the same birthday (November 9). From 1942–1957 they gave joint birthday parties where each presented a surprise production number with special material featuring their friends, including Judy Garland, Ethel Merman, Lena Horne, Gene Kelly, Marilyn Monroe, Dorothy Dandridge, Maureen O'Hara, Ray Bolger, Ann Sothern, Phil Silvers, Danny Kaye, Charles Walters, Cole Porter, Hugh Martin and Ralph Blane. They never told the other what they were going to present.

== Show Boat ==
Edens and producer Arthur Freed were the guiding forces behind MGM's 1951 screen version of Show Boat. Edens headed the search for the right singer-actor to play Joe, the key supporting character who sings "Ol' Man River", and discovered William Warfield after reading a rave review of his performance in a New York song recital. Edens also supervised the film's reediting when the producer and director found the original cut too slow.

== Personal life ==
Before moving to California, Edens was married to Martha LaPrelle, but they spent much time apart and eventually divorced. By the time he knew Judy Garland, he was living as a gay man.

== Awards ==
Nominated:

- Academy Award for Best Scoring, 1939: Babes in Arms, with Georgie Stoll
- Academy Award for Best Scoring, 1940: Strike Up the Band, with Georgie Stoll
- Academy Award for Best Song, 1940: "Our Love Affair" from Strike Up the Band (music and lyrics)
- Academy Award for Best Scoring of a Musical Picture, 1942: For Me and My Gal (film), with Georgie Stoll
- Academy Award for Best Song, 1947: "Pass That Peace Pipe" from Good News (music and lyrics) with Ralph Blane and Hugh Martin

Won:

- Academy Award for Best Scoring of a Musical Picture, 1948: Easter Parade, with Johnny Green
- Academy Award for Best Scoring of a Musical Picture, 1949: On the Town, with Lennie Hayton
- Academy Award for Best Scoring of a Musical Picture, 1950: Annie Get Your Gun, with Adolph Deutsch
