= 1906 in animation =

Events in 1906 in animation.

== Films released ==
- April 6 – Humorous Phases of Funny Faces (United States)
- Date unknown – The House of Ghosts (France)

== Births ==
=== January ===
- January 19: Lanny Ross, American singer and actor (singing voice of Prince David in Gulliver's Travels), (d. 1988).
- January 20: Russ Dyson, American animator (Walt Disney Animation Studios, Warner Bros. Cartoons), (d. 1956).
- January 24: Wilfred Jackson, American animator, director, composer and arranger (Walt Disney Company), (d. 1988).

=== February ===
- February 5:
  - Ted Eshbaugh, American animator and film director (Goofy Goat, The Wizard of Oz, The Sunshine Makers), (d. 1969).
  - John Carradine, American actor (voice of Tyrone T. Tattersall in Shinbone Alley, The Tramp in The Mouse and His Child, The Wizard in Aladdin and the Wonderful Lamp, The Great Owl in The Secret of NIMH), (d. 1988).
- February 27: Carlo Vinci, American animator (Mighty Mouse, Yogi Bear, Flintstones), (d. 1993).

=== March ===
- March 3: Donald Novis, English-born American actor and tenor (voice of Singing Dog in Toyland Broadcast, sang "Love is a Song" and "Looking for Romance" in Bambi, and "Peace on Earth" in Lady and the Tramp), (d. 1966).
- March 7: Isadore Sparber, American storyboard artist, screenwriter, film director, and animation producer (Fleischer Studios, Famous Studios), (d. 1958).
- March 12: Courtland Hector Hoppin, American animator and photographer (La Joie de Vivre), (d. 1974).
- March 15: Paul Smith, American animator and film director (Walt Disney Animation Studios, Walter Lantz Productions, Warner Bros. Cartoons), (d. 1980).
- March 16: Robert Gribbroek, American animator, lay-out artist and background painter (Warner Bros. Cartoons), (d. 1971).

=== April ===
- April 4: Bea Benaderet, American actress and comedienne (voice of Betty Rubble in The Flintstones, Little Red Riding Hood in Little Red Riding Rabbit, Granny in Tweety and Sylvester, Witch Hazel in Bewitched Bunny, Mama Bear in The Three Bears), (d. 1968).
- April 6: Les Kline, American animator, (animated for Walter Lantz on many Woody Woodpecker, Chilly Willy, and Oswald The Lucky Rabbit cartoons, and was Lantz’s longest serving employee, working from 1929 to 1971, with a small gap in the early 50s), (d. 1997)
- April 18: Edith Vernick, Ukrainian-American animator, supervised the assistant animation department for both the Fleischer Studios and the Metro-Goldwyn-Mayer cartoon studio (Gulliver's Travels, The Cat Concerto), (d. 1992).
- April 19: Ray Abrams, American animator and director (Metro-Goldwyn-Mayer cartoon studio, Walter Lantz Productions, Hanna-Barbera), (d. 1981).
- April 26: Horst von Möllendorff, German comics artist, cartoonist and animator (Verwitterte Melodie, Der Schneemann, Wedding in the Coral Sea), (d. 1992).

=== May ===
- May 17: Jack Carr, American voice actor and animator (Charles Mintz, Warner Bros. Cartoons, Hanna-Barbera), and actor (voice of Buddy in Looney Tunes), (d. 1967).
- May 19: Jimmy MacDonald, Scottish-American animator, actor, musician and sound effects maker (Walt Disney Company, voice of Mickey Mouse from 1948 to 1977, original voice of Chip, Gus and Jaq in Cinderella, and Humphrey the Bear, the unlucky wolf in The Sword in the Stone), (d. 1991).
- May 24: Danny Webb, American voice actor (voice of Egghead in Daffy Duck and Egghead and Cinderella Meets Fella), (d. 1983).

=== July ===
- July 3: George Sanders, British actor and singer (voice of Shere Khan in The Jungle Book), (d. 1972).
- July 27: Ben Clopton, American animator and animation director, directed early films of Oswald the Lucky Rabbit (Walt Disney Company, Harman-Ising, Ub Iwerks, Walter Lantz, Fleischer Studios), (d. 1987).

=== August ===
- August 5: John Huston, American filmmaker and actor (voice of Gandalf in The Hobbit and The Return of the King, narrator in Epic and The Black Cauldron), (d. 1987).
- August 7: Ernestine Wade, American actress (voice of Butterfly in Song of the South, Billy's Mother in Hey, Hey, Hey, It's Fat Albert, Veronica's Aunt in Willie Mays and the Say-Hey Kid), (d. 1983).
- August 12: Tedd Pierce, American animation writer (Fleischer Studios, Warner Bros. Cartoons) and actor (voice of King Bombo in Gulliver's Travels, C. Blagley Beetle in Mr. Bug Goes to Town, Tom Dover in The Dover Boys, Tall Shipwreck Survivor in Wackiki Wabbit), (d. 1972).
- August 18: John W. Burton, American film producer (head of Warner Bros. Cartoons from 1958 to 1960) and cinematographer, (d. 1978).
- August 31: Claire Parker, American engineer (inventor of the Pinscreen) and animator, (d. 1981).

=== September ===
- September 2:
  - George Gordon, American animator and film director (Terrytoons, MGM, Hanna-Barbera), (d. 1986).
  - Barbara Jo Allen, American actress (voice of Fauna in Sleeping Beauty, Goliath's Mother in Goliath II, Scullery Maid in The Sword in the Stone), (d. 1974).
- September 15: Dmitry Nalbandyan, Armenian animator and painter, (d. 1993).
- September 29: Charles Wolcott, American composer (Walt Disney Company), (d. 1987).

=== October ===
- October 1: Walter Clinton, American animator and comics artist (Tex Avery, Hanna-Barbera), (d. 1992).
- October 5: Hermann Diehl, German animator and film director (The Seven Ravens, Mecki), (d. 1983).
- October 30: Paul Smith, American composer (Walt Disney Animation Studios), (d. 1985).

=== November ===
- November 10: Frank Engli, American animator and comics artist, letterer and colorist (Fleischer Studios), (d. 1977).
- November 13: Hermione Baddeley, English actress (voice of Madame Adelaide Bonfamille in The Aristocats, Auntie Shrew in The Secret of NIMH), (d. 1986).
- November 21: Mary Ellen Bute, American animator, animation producer and director (Tarantella), (d. 1983).
- November 25: Larry Clemmons, American animator, screenwriter, and actor (Walt Disney Animation Studios), (d. 1988).
- November 29: Luis van Rooten, Mexican-American actor (voice of the King and Grand Duke in Cinderella), (d. 1973).

=== December ===
- December 9: Freddy Martin, American bandleader and tenor saxophonist (Bumble Boogie segment of Melody Time), (d. 1983).

=== Specific date unknown ===
- Wan Chaochen, Chinese film director and producer (Wan Brothers), (d. 1992).
