= Lost Tracks 1929–1959 =

Box set by Judy Garland
- Released: August 2, 2010
- Recorded: 1929–1959
- Label: JSP

Judy Garland chronology
The Very Best of Judy Garland (2007)	Lost Tracks 1929–1959 (2010)	Swan Songs, First Flights (2014)

Lost Tracks 1929–1959 is a compilation album by American singer and actress Judy Garland, released on August 2, 2010 by JSP Records. The four-CD box set was compiled and annotated by Lawrence Schulman and produced by John Stedman. Spanning recordings from 1929 to 1959, it contains 100 tracks, including 55 previously unreleased recordings, drawn from studio sessions, radio broadcasts, concerts and film-related performances.

The collection was reissued in 2015 as a single-disc album titled The Best of Lost Tracks 1929–1959, featuring 22 selections from the original box set and five additional recordings, four of which appeared on CD for the first time.

Critics generally praised the collection, highlighting the historical value of its rare recordings, Garland's performances and the quality of the audio restoration.

== Background and album details ==
Lost Tracks 1929–1959 is a four-disc compilation spanning Garland's early recording career from 1929 to 1959. The 100-track collection includes 55 previously unreleased recordings, all of which were remastered. It was compiled and annotated by Lawrence Schulman and produced by John Stedman, and was first released in the United Kingdom on August 2, 2010, through JSP Records.

The set is divided into four sections covering different periods of her career. The first disc, "The Decca Tests & Early Radio", opens with two Decca studio recordings made on March 29, 1935, when Garland was 12 years old: "Bill" and a medley of "On the Good Ship Lollipop", "The Object of My Affection" and "Dinah". It also includes performances from radio programs such as The Shell Chateau Hour, Jack Oakie's College, Good News and The Pepsodent Show, dating from 1935 to 1940. The second and third discs, "Young Judy on the Radio" and "The Radio Years", cover broadcasts from 1940 to 1944 and 1944 to 1953, respectively, featuring solo performances, film-song promotions and duets with performers including Mickey Rooney, Frank Sinatra, Bing Crosby, Fred Astaire and Al Jolson.

The fourth disc, "On Stage & The Gumm Sisters", includes recordings from the Gumm Sisters' 1929 Warner Bros./Vitaphone short films, as well as performances from concerts and special events between 1940 and 1959. Among these are selections from the 1945 Jerome Kern Memorial Concert, Garland's 1951 performances at the London Palladium and a concert at the Municipal Auditorium in Long Beach, California, on July 8, 1955. Other recordings include "The Man That Got Away", "Over the Rainbow", "Swanee", "Liza", "Me and My Shadow" and "Rock-a-Bye Your Baby with a Dixie Melody". The collection also features spoken introductions by radio hosts and vocal performances taken from radio adaptations of films such as Strike Up the Band (1940), For Me and My Gal (1942) and Easter Parade (1948).

== The Best of Lost Tracks 1929–1959 ==
In 2015, JSP Records re-released the compilation in a single-disc compilation featuring 22 selections from the four-disc, titled The Best of Lost Tracks 1929–1959 it includes five bonus tracks, four of which made their first appearance on CD. The additional recordings include "On Revival Day" (1936), "Goody Goodbye" (1939), "Ding Dong, the Witch Is Dead" (1939), "Over the Rainbow" (1948) and "Stars and Stripes Forever" (1951), and were restored and remastered by John H. Haley. The cover art was designed by Andrew Aitken of Aitken Design.

== Critical reception ==
Professional ratings
Review scores
Source	Rating
Daily Express	3/5 stars

The Daily Express called the collection "probably one for dyed-in-the-wool fans of the great Garland", adding that "Judy never disappoints". Will Friedwald of The Wall Street Journal considered it "well worth owning" and singled out the fourth disc as "a fascinating assemblage of live concert cuts". Friedwald added that "nothing astonishes more than that 1935 'Bill'", praising Garland's "remarkable confidence" in performing the song and describing her delivery of its final words, "I don't know", "a miraculous transformation". He concluded that, even at age 12, Garland was "already larger than life".

Steven Suskin of Playbill called the collection "fascinating" and praised the two 1935 Decca test recordings as "astounding" and "remarkable in the pure sense of the word". The Ocala Star-Banner wrote that the collection's rare recordings "should easily take fans over the rainbow", while the ARSC Journal deemed it as "an essential set for devoted Garland idolaters and an exceptional pleasure for anyone interested in the sounds, history, and variety of the golden age of American popular music and show business". They also commended the restoration work, stating that "the sound engineering is admirable throughout" and that most recordings "have been restored to near perfection".

== Track listing ==
=== Lost Tracks 1929–1959 ===
Disc A: The Decca Tests & Early Radio (1935–1939)
No.	Title	Writer(s)	Length
1.	"Bill"	Oscar Hammerstein II; Jerome Kern
2.	"On the Good Ship Lollipop / The Object of My Affection"	Richard A. Whiting; Sidney Clare; Pinky Tomlin; Coy Poe; Jimmie Grier
3.	"Broadway Rhythm"	Arthur Freed; Nacio Herb Brown
4.	"Zing! Went the Strings of My Heart"	James F. Hanley
5.	"Smiles"	J. Will Callahan; Lee S. Roberts
6.	"They Can't Take That Away from Me"	George Gershwin; Ira Gershwin
7.	"College Swing"	Frank Loesser; Hoagy Carmichael
8.	"Cryin' For The Carolines"	Harry Warren; Sam M. Lewis; Joe Young
9.	"God's Country"	Harold Arlen; E. Y. Harburg
10.	"How Deep Is the Ocean?"	Irving Berlin
11.	"Franz Schubert's Serenade"	Franz Schubert
12.	"My Old Kentucky Home"	Stephen Foster
13.	"Are You Having Any Fun?"	Jack Yellen; Sammy Fain
14.	"Dardanella"	Fred Fisher; Felix Bernard; Johnny S. Black
15.	"Oh Johnny, Oh Johnny, Oh!"	Abe Olman; Ed Rose
16.	"Ma (He's Making Eyes At Me)"	Sidney Clare; Con Conrad
17.	"Sweet or Swing?"	Roger Edens
18.	"Franklin D. Roosevelt Jones"	Harold Rome
19.	"Sweet Sixteen"	R. Edens
20.	"Comes Love"	Sam H. Stept; Lew Brown; Charles Tobias
21.	"Silent Night"	Franz Xaver Gruber; Joseph Mohr

Disc B: Young Judy on the Radio (1940–1944)
No.	Title	Writer(s)	Length
1.	"Alice Blue Gown"	Joseph McCarthy; Harry Tierney
2.	"Too Romantic"	Johnny Burke; James V. Monaco
3.	"It's a Hap-Hap-Happy Day"	Al J. Neiburg; Sammy Timberg; Winston Sharples
4.	"All the Things You Are"	O. Hammerstein II; Jerome Kern
5.	"My Wonderful One, Let's Dance"	Nacio Herb Brown; Arthur Freed; Roger Edens
6.	"I'm Nobody's Baby"	Milton Ager; Benny Davis; Lester Santly
7.	"Drummer Boy"	R. Edens
8.	"Auld Lang Syne"	Robert Burns; Traditional
9.	"I Hear a Rhapsody"	George Fragos; Jack Baker; Dick Gasparre
10.	"(America) My Country, 'Tis of Thee"	Samuel Francis Smith; Henry Carey
11.	"Chin Up, Cheerio, Carry On"	Yip Harburg; Burton Lane
12.	"Strike Up the Band"	Ira Gershwin; George Gershwin
13.	"How About You?" (duet with Mickey Rooney)	Arthur Freed; Burton Lane
14.	"The Peanut Vendor"	Moisés Simons; L. Wolfe Gilbert; Marion Sunshine
15.	"Abe Lincoln Had Just One Country"	Oscar Hammerstein II; Otto Harbach; Jerome Kern
16.	"Minnie from Trinidad"	Roger Edens
17.	"Over the Rainbow"	Y. Harburg; H. Arlen
18.	"It's a Great Day for the Irish"	R. Edens
19.	"On the Sunny Side of the Street"	Dorothy Fields; Jimmy McHugh
20.	"I'll Remember April"	Don Raye; Gene de Paul; Patricia Johnston
21.	"Zing! Went the Strings of My Heart"	James F. Hanley
22.	"How You Gonna Keep 'Em Down on the Farm?"	J. Young; S. M. Lewis; Walter Donaldson
23.	"I Never Knew"	Ted Pitts; Raymond B. Egan; Roy Marsh
24.	"This Is the Army, Mr. Jones"	I. Berlin
25.	"People Will Say We're in Love" (duet with Bing Crosby)	Oscar Hammerstein II; Richard Rodgers
26.	"The Boy Next Door"	Hugh Martin; Ralph Blane
27.	"Speak Low"	Ogden Nash; Kurt Weill
28.	"Embraceable You" (duet with Frank Sinatra)	Ira Gershwin; George Gershwin
29.	"Can Do, Will Do (The Song of the Seabees)"	Sam M. Lewis; Peter DeRose

Disc C: The Radio Years (1944–1953)
No.	Title	Writer(s)	Length
1.	"The Trolley Song"	H. Martin; R. Blane
2.	"Dixieland Band"	Johnny Mercer; Bobby Hackett
3.	"Something to Remember You By" (duet with Bing Crosby)	Howard Dietz; Arthur Schwartz
4.	"Long Ago and Far Away"	I. Gershwin; J. Kern
5.	"I May Be Wrong (But I Think You're Wonderful)"	Harry Ruskin; Henry Sullivan
6.	"Love"	H. Martin; R. Blane
7.	"We're Off to See Herr Hitler (parody) / I've Got Sixpence (trad. English) / When We Go Rolling Home / Bless Them All (WW II patriotic)"	J. Tams; Fred Godfrey; Robert Kewley
8.	"Gotta Be This or That" (duet with Frank Sinatra)	Sunny Skylar
9.	"My Romance" (duet with Frank Sinatra)	Lorenz Hart; Richard Rodgers
10.	"It Came Upon the Midnight Clear"	Edmund Sears; Richard Storrs Willis
11.	"I've Got the Sun in the Morning"	I. Berlin
12.	"Liza (All the Clouds'll Roll Away)"	I. Gershwin; G. Kahn; G. Gershwin
13.	"Connecticut" (duet with Bing Crosby)	H. Martin; R. Blane
14.	"I've Got You Under My Skin"	Cole Porter
15.	"Blue Skies / How Deep Is the Ocean?"	I. Berlin
16.	"It Only Happens When I Dance with You" (duet with Fred Astaire)	I. Berlin
17.	"Pretty Baby" (duet with Al Jolson)	Tony Jackson; Gus Norton; Egbert Van Alstyne
18.	"I'm in Love with a Wonderful Guy"	O. Hammerstein II; R. Rodgers
19.	"Get Happy"	Ted Koehler; Harold Arlen
20.	"Mean to Me"	Roy Turk; Fred E. Ahlert
21.	"I Want to Go Back to Michigan (Down on the Farm)"	I. Berlin
22.	"Easter Parade" (duet with Fred Astaire)	I. Berlin
23.	"You Made Me Love You (I Didn't Want to Do It) / For Me and My Gal / The Boy Next Door / The Trolley Song"	Joseph McCarthy; James V. Monaco; E. Ray Goetz; Edgar Leslie; George W. Meyer; Hugh Martin; Ralph Blane; H. Martin; R. Blane
24.	"A Pretty Girl Milking Her Cow"	R. Edens
25.	"Alexander's Ragtime Band"	I. Berlin
26.	"This Is New"	I. Gershwin; K. Weill
27.	"My Ship (Has Sails That Are Made of Silk)"	I. Gershwin; K. Weill

Disc D: On Stage & The Gumm Sisters (1929–1959)
No.	Title	Writer(s)	Length
1.	"Over the Rainbow"	Y. Harburg; H. Arlen
2.	"It's a Great Day for the Irish"	R. Edens
3.	"The Trolley Song"	H. Martin; R. Blane
4.	"Look for the Silver Lining"	Buddy DeSylva; Jerome Kern
5.	"Look for the Silver Lining"	Buddy DeSylva; Jerome Kern
6.	"Who?"	O. Harbach; O. Hammerstein II; J. Kern
7.	"The Right Romance"	L. Robbins; Jerome Kern
8.	"All Through the Day"	O. Hammerstein II; J. Kern
9.	"At Long Last Here I Am"	R. Edens
10.	"Just One of Those Things"	C. Porter
11.	"Love Is Sweeping the Country"	I. Gershwin; G. Gershwin
12.	"The Man That Got Away"	I. Gershwin; H. Arlen
13.	"Carolina in the Morning"	G. Kahn; W. Donaldson
14.	"A Pretty Girl Milking Her Cow"	R. Edens
15.	"After You've Gone"	Henry Creamer; Turner Layton
16.	"Over the Rainbow"	Y. Harburg; H. Arlen
17.	"Liza (All the Clouds'll Roll Away)"	I. Gershwin; G. Kahn; G. Gershwin
18.	"Swanee"	I. Caesar; G. Gershwin
19.	"Me and My Shadow"	Billy Rose; Al Jolson; Dave Dreyer
20.	"Rock-a-Bye Your Baby with a Dixie Melody"	Sam M. Lewis; Joe Young; Jean Schwartz
21.	"That's the Good Old Sunny South"	Jack Yellen; Milton Ager
22.	"When the Butterflies Kiss the Buttercups Goodnight"	Harry Pease; Charles O'Flynn; Ed G. Nelson
23.	"The Land of Let's Pretend"	Grant Clarke; Harry Akst

== Personnel ==
Credits adapted from Lost Tracks 1929–1959 CD.

- Produced by John Stedman
- Compiled by Lawrence Schulman
- Sleeve notes for CD A and CD B by Scott Brogan and Lawrence Schulman
- Sleeve notes for CD C and CD D by Lawrence Schulman
- Recording details by Lawrence Schulman
- Restoration of the 1935 Decca test records by Gary Galo
- Transfer and restoration of the Presto lacquer disc of the 1939/1940 Ma (He's Making Eyes at Me) by Gary Galo
- The 1940 Alice Blue Gown from the collection of Eric Hemphill
- Transfer of the 1941 Strike Up the Band by Wendell Oppewall and Gary Galo; restoration by Gary Galo
- The 1948 Blue Skies/How Deep Is the Ocean? and It Only Happens When I Dance With You from the collections of Jerry Waters and Fred McFadden
- Remastering by Peter Rynston of Tall Order Studios
