= Toonerville =

Toonerville may refer to:

- Toonerville Folks, a 20th-century comic strip
- Toonerville, Colorado, an unincorporated community
- Toonerville, Kentucky, an unincorporated community
- Toonerville, Missouri, an unincorporated community
- Toonerville, Pennsylvania, an unincorporated community
- Toonerville Rifa 13, a street gang in Los Angeles County, California
