= Molly Moo-Cow =

- Rainbow Parade character
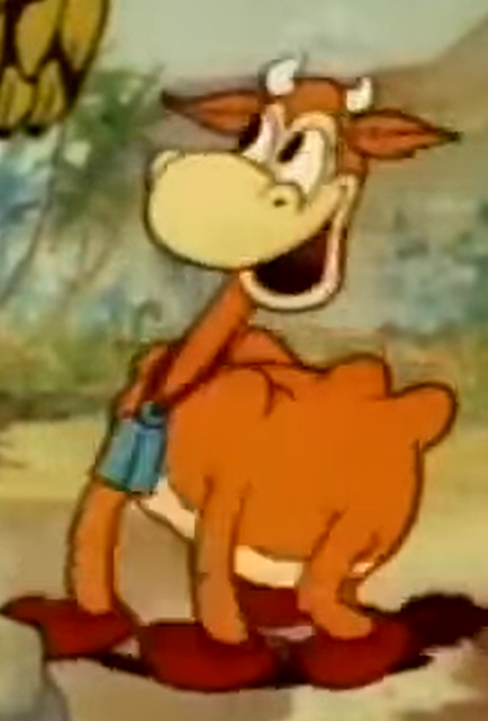
- Still of Molly from her final appearance, Molly Moo-Cow and Robinson Crusoe.
- First appearance: "Picnic Panic"; The Hunting Season; May 3, 1935
- Last appearance: "Toonerville Trolley"; Molly Moo-Cow and Robinson Crusoe; February 28, 1936
- Created by: Burt Gillett, Tom Palmer

In-universe information
- Full name: Molly Moo-Cow
- Species: Cow

Molly Moo-Cow is an animated character appearing in Rainbow Parade shorts created by Burt Gillett and Tom Palmer for Van Beuren Studios in the 1930s. Six cartoons were produced.

This series was later syndicated for television by Walter O. Gutlohn and Commonwealth Pictures. Some of these can be found in DVD collections of public domain cartoons.

== Picnic Panic ==
The first cartoon to feature the character. Was the only time Molly Moo-Cow was portrayed as the antagonist (public domain).

The Picnic Panic is a 1935 cartoon directed by Burt Gillett & Tom Palmer. Produced For RKO Radio Pictures and would be the only time Molly Moo-Cow was portrayed as the antagonist.

A few kids are watching the rain outside when they hear singing in the kitchen. There, they find a coffee pot, kettle, and teapot singing about the rain. After their done, they introduce themselves to the kids and tell the kids a story about a picnic that the coffee pot went on. This is when the animated portion comes in, showing the Mr. Coffee Pot and his wife the teapot going on a picnic, things go smoothly for the family until Molly Moo-Cow ruins the fun. That causes the coffee pot family to retaliate against her and shoo her away. This teaches the kids a valuable lesson in life.

== The Hunting Season ==
The second cartoon to feature the character. The first time Molly Moo-Cow was shown as the main protagonist (public domain).

The Hunting Season is a 1935 cartoon directed by Burt Gillett & Tom Palmer. It was produced for RKO Radio Pictures and would be the first time Molly Moo-Cow was portrayed as the main protagonist.

Molly Moo-Cow is enjoying life in the great outdoors when a hunter comes along and starts hunting animals, causing her to try her best to get rid of the hunter.

== Molly Moo-Cow and the Butterflies ==
The third cartoon to feature the character (public domain).

Molly Moo-Cow and the Butterflies is a 1935 cartoon directed by Burt Gillett & Tom Palmer. Produced For RKO Radio Pictures and would be the first time appearance Molly Moo-Cow in three-strip Technicolor, replacing the old Cinecolor process.

Molly Moo-Cow is living in a forest, enjoying the sight of butterflies, when a butterfly collector comes in, kidnapping butterflies for his own collection. Molly Moo-Cow manages to set the butterflies free and is rewarded by them for her good deeds.

== Molly Moo-Cow and the Indians ==
The fourth cartoon to feature the character (public domain).

Molly Moo-Cow and the Indians is a 1935 cartoon directed by Burt Gillett & Tom Palmer. Produced For RKO Radio Pictures.

Molly Moo-Cow and two ducks travel west with settlers, hitched to the back of a covered wagon. When the ducks stray from the group and find a Native American settlement, Molly Moo-Cow follows them, attempting to return the ducks. In doing so, they save a Native American woman's child from drowning in the river. The ducks are nearly kidnapped by a Native American hunter, but Molly Moo-Cow and the Native American woman outsmart him and return the ducks to the wagon.

== Molly Moo-Cow and Rip Van Winkle ==
The fifth cartoon to feature the character (public domain).

Molly Moo-Cow and Rip Van Winkle is a 1935 cartoon directed by Burt Gillett & Tom Palmer. Produced For RKO Radio Pictures.

Molly Moo-Cow while in a forest manages to find a settlement of gnomes. She ends up getting into tons of mischief because of this however.

== Toonerville Trolley ==
The First Rainbow Parade To Feature Toonerville Folks! From Fontaine Fox. Molly Moo-Cow makes an appearance in this cartoon (public domain).

The Picnic Panic is a 1936 cartoon directed by Burt Gillett & Tom Palmer. Produced For RKO Radio Pictures and would be the only time Molly Moo-Cow was in a Toonerville Folks cartoon.

The Skipper is attempting to get his trolley working for the morning train. Mrs. Katrina manages to get the trolley working for him however and he manages to start rolling. However, while on his morning run he runs into Molly Moo-Cow who ends up derailing his trolley. Running it straight into a mud puddle. He calls of Katrina to help him out with Katrina and she comes with the solution to paint the trolley completely red. However, this comes at a cost as later during his run, the Skipper later comes across a bull who ends up attacking him because of his trolley color. Calling on Katrina again to help him out to sho of the bull, when he gets to the train station he realizes that his trolley isn't due ‘til the next week.

== Molly Moo-Cow and Robinson Crusoe ==
The last cartoon to feature Molly Moo-Cow (public domain).

Molly Moo-Cow and Robinson Crusoe is a 1936 cartoon directed by Burt Gillett & Tom Palmer. Produced For RKO Radio Pictures and would be the last time Molly Moo-Cow was portrayed in a cartoon.

Molly Moo-Cow is stranded at sea and ends up getting stranded on a remote island. There, she finds Robinson Crusoe who is happy that he's all alone. However, once he finds Molly Moo-Cow, he kicks her off of the island. However, after kicking her out. He realizes that the island isn't as remote as he thought. Getting captured by cannibal natives who put him in a large pot. Molly Moo-Cow rushes back to the island to save him. With Robinson Crusoe & Molly Moo-Cow becoming best friends.
