= Rainbow Parade Cartoon =

Series of short films

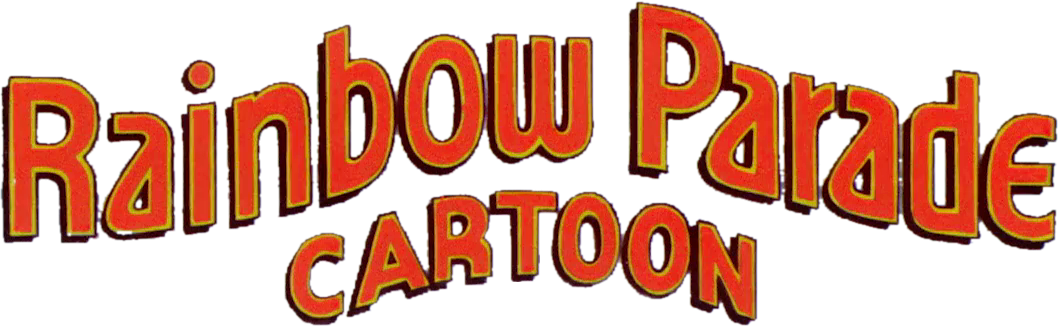
- The logo of the Rainbow Parade series.
- Directed by: Burt Gillett; Ted Eshbaugh; Steve Muffatti; Tom Palmer; Shamus Culhane; Dan Gordon
- Produced by: Amedee J. Van Beuren
- Music by: Winston Sharples
- Production company: Van Beuren Studios
- Distributed by: RKO Radio Pictures
- Running time: 7–8 minutes
- Country: United States
- Language: English

Rainbow Parade Cartoon is a series of 26 animated shorts produced by Van Beuren Studios and distributed to theaters by RKO between 1934 and 1936. This was the only color cartoon series produced by Van Beuren, and the final series of the studio.

== History ==
The Van Beuren Corporation was struggling to make successful cartoon series and had multiple production struggles throughout the early 1930s, with a lawsuit from Walt Disney Productions over copyright infringement, and ill-fated attempts at cartoon series like Tom and Jerry and Cubby Bear. In 1933, when Walt Disney received universal praise for the cartoon short Three Little Pigs, the short's director, Burt Gillett, was also seen as a top commodity in the animation industry.

Gillett was lured by the Van Beuren studio with prospects of higher pay and full creative control over the animation staff, and he joined around April 1934. Right away, the animation output of Van Beuren's studio took a drastic change. Older series ended and were replaced with the short-lived series Toddle Tales, notable for including live-action wraparounds with child actors interacting with animated characters, and the Rainbow Parade cartoons, which became their main series throughout the rest of the studio's existence.

Production was troubled, as Gillett was known for being hard to work with, having large emotional outbursts and mood swings, constantly firing crew members, as well as demanding harsh work environments for animators. This caused the constant rejection of large chunks of animation or full cartoons well into production, resulting in enormous overtime hours to compensate and replace animation, voices, and music, often gone unpaid. Because of this, animators working at the studio called for union action and held strikes against the studio, which Gillett and Van Beuren combated long throughout production.

In addition, Disney held a contract with Technicolor for exclusive use of their three-strip process when the Rainbow Parades started, so Van Beuren opted for the cheaper two-color Cinecolor process for their first season, a process which featured a more limited palette of hues. Once Disney's contract expired in 1935, Van Beuren quickly switched to Technicolor for the rest of the series.

Many of the Rainbow Parade cartoons were one-shot stories with no recurring characters, but some of the films featured originally created characters like the Parrotville Parrots and Molly Moo-Cow, or established characters repurposed for color animation like the Toonerville Folks and Felix the Cat. Notable cartoon directors like Shamus Culhane and Dan Gordon contributed to this series when they were still establishing themselves in the industry.

Ultimately, production on the cartoons was cancelled in 1936 when Disney, long a rival of the Van Beuren cartoon studio, signed an exclusive deal to produce cartoons with Van Beuren's distributor, RKO Radio Pictures. The Rainbow Parade cartoons wrapped production with the staff let go in May 1936 and the final cartoons distributed until October of the same year, with some cartoons still unproduced.

== Aftermath ==
The producer Amedee J. Van Beuren died in 1938, not long after the studio's closure, and independent distributors like Walter O. Gutlohn and Commonwealth Pictures purchased distribution rights for the films to be sold and rented in home movie catalogues. After the copyrights had lapsed, low-budget home video distributors used any film prints of these cartoons they could find to cheaply include in cartoon compilations in the wakes of VHS and DVD.

Efforts have been taken in recent years to restore these cartoons as in 2021, Thunderbean Animation, in association with Blackhawk Films and the UCLA, released a Blu-ray collection of the first 13 Rainbow Parade cartoons from the existing master materials, updating their DVD collection from 2009. The second half of the series is available as of 2026. It's also currently available from the best existing prints released by Image DVD/Blackhawk Films/Film Preservation Associates.

== Filmography ==
#	Title	Release	Characters	Directors	Films	Notes
1	Pastry Town Wedding	July 27, 1934	Bride, Groom, Pastry Chefs	Burt Gillett; Ted Eshbaugh	1st Rainbow Parade	First Rainbow Parade short.; First short in two-strip Cinecolor.; The first short by the Van Beuren Corporation to be in color.; First short co-directed by Burt Gillett and Ted Eshbaugh.; Later reissued as a promotional film for Cushman's Sons, Inc. This reissue adds extra animated scenes advertising the bakery, a remade wedding scene, as well as special title cards.
2	The Parrotville Fire Department	September 14, 1934	The Flasher, Firefighters	Burt Gillett; Steve Muffatti		The only short co-directed by Steve Muffatti.; The first of three "Parrotville" cartoons in the Rainbow Parade series.; Original MPPDA production code #148.
3	The Sunshine Makers	January 11, 1935	Gnomes, Goblins	Burt Gillett Ted Eshbaugh	Borden's 1940 reissue	Re-issued in 1940 as a promotional film for Borden's Milk, with the "Borden" script on the title card. The original 1935 Rainbow Parade titles have been found.; This cartoon was a runner-up on The 50 Greatest Cartoons list.; Original MPPDA production code #242.
4	Parrotville Old Folks	January 25, 1935	Mrs. Birdkins, Captain, Friend, Old Folks	Burt Gillett Tom Palmer		First short co-directed by Tom Palmer.; The second of three "Parrotville" cartoons in the Rainbow Parade series.
5	Japanese Lanterns	March 8, 1935	Japanese Children, Father, Mother, Stork	Burt Gillett Ted Eshbaugh		Renamed Chinese Lanterns by Official Films during World War II.; Final short co-directed by Ted Eshbaugh.; Original MPPDA production code #317.
6	Spinning Mice	April 5, 1935	Wizard/Rabbit, Lizards/Doves, Toad/Squirrel, Throwback Mice/Devils, Girl, Boy, Mice	Burt Gillett Tom Palmer		The first of two Rainbow Parade cartoons to contain live-action prologue and epilogue sequences.
7	Picnic Panic (The Stupid Teapot)	May 3, 1935	Molly Moo-Cow, Teapots, Teacups	Burt Gillett Tom Palmer		First appearance of Molly Moo-Cow.; The second of two Rainbow Parade cartoons to contain a live-action prologue and epilogue with animated wraparounds.; Original MPPDA production code #374.
8	The Merry Kittens	May 31, 1935	Three Kittens, Terrier	Burt Gillett Shamus Culhane		Co-directed by Shamus Culhane; Original MPPDA production code #392, listed on credits instead of its standalone screen.
9	Parrotville Post-Office	June 28, 1935	Captain, The Black Parrot, Mrs. Birdkins, Mr. Birdkins' Children	Burt Gillett Tom Palmer		The last of three "Parrotville" cartoons in the Rainbow Parade series.
10	The Rag Dog	July 19, 1935	Three Kittens, Two Terriers	Burt Gillett		Although credited solely to Burt Gillett, this short was co-directed by Shamus Culhane, who left the studio before its release.
11	The Hunting Season	August 19, 1935	Molly Moo-Cow, Ducks, Hunters	Burt Gillett Tom Palmer		
12	Scotty Finds a Home	August 23, 1935	Scotty, Family, Squatter	Burt Gillett		
13	Bird Scouts	September 20, 1935	Birds, Cat	Burt Gillett Tom Palmer		The final Van Beuren short in two-strip Cinecolor.
14	Molly Moo-Cow and the Butterflies	November 15, 1935	Molly Moo-Cow, Collector, Butterflies	Burt Gillett Tom Palmer		The first Van Beuren short in three-strip Technicolor.
15	Molly Moo-Cow and the Indians	November 15, 1935	Molly Moo-Cow, Indian Squaw, Papoose, Indian Brave, Two Ducks	Burt Gillett Tom Palmer		
16	Molly Moo-Cow and Rip Van Wrinkle	December 17, 1935	Molly Moo-Cow, Rip Van Winkle, Little Men	Burt Gillett Tom Palmer		
17	Toonerville Trolley	January 17, 1936	Toonerville Trolley, Skipper, Katrinka, Molly Moo-Cow (cameo), Bull	Burt Gillett Tom Palmer		The first of three Rainbow Parade cartoons based on the Toonerville Trolley comic strip.; Molly Moo-Cow makes a cameo.; The only Toonerville short co-directed by Tom Palmer.
18	The Goose That Laid the Golden Egg	February 7, 1936	Felix the Cat, Goldie, Captain Kidd, Pirates	Burt Gillett Tom Palmer		The first Felix the Cat cartoon in the Rainbow Parade series. Also the first three-strip Technicolor appearance of Felix the Cat.; This cartoon was one of 3 Felix the Cat cartoons made by the Van Beuren Corporation.
19	Molly Moo-Cow and Robinson Crusoe	February 28, 1936	Molly Moo-Cow, Robinson Crusoe, Cannibals	Burt Gillett Tom Palmer		Molly Moo-Cow's final appearance.
20	Neptune Nonsense	March 20, 1936	Felix the Cat, King Neptune, Annabelle, Octopus, Electric Eel, Fish, Mermaid	Burt Gillett Tom Palmer		The final short co-directed by Burt Gillett and Tom Palmer.
21	Bold King Cole	May 29, 1936	Felix the Cat, Old King Cole, Ghosts	Burt Gillett		Final Felix the Cat released cartoon in the Rainbow Parade series.; The Only Felix short solely directed by Burt Gillett.
22	A Waif's Welcome	June 19, 1936	Orphan, Mother, Father, Son	Tom Palmer		The First of two shorts solely directed by Tom Palmer.
23	Trolley Ahoy	July 3, 1936	Toonerville Trolley, Skipper, Mr. Bang, Katrinka	Burt Gillett		The second of three Rainbow Parade cartoons based on the Toonerville Trolley comic strip.
24	Cupid Gets His Man	July 24, 1936	Dan Cupid, Edna May Oliver, W. C. Fields	Tom Palmer		One source suggests that the spinster actually is a dead ringer for Margaret Hamilton (who would later gain fame as the Wicked Witch in The Wizard of Oz).; The Second and final of two shorts solely directed by Tom Palmer.
25	It's a Greek Life	August 2, 1936	Centaur, Mercury, Two Ducks	Dan Gordon		The only short directed by Dan Gordon.
26	Toonerville Picnic	October 2, 1936	Toonerville Trolley, Skipper, Mr. Bang, Doctor, Katrinka, Dog, Octopus	Burt Gillett		Final Rainbow Parade series short.; The last of three Rainbow Parade cartoons based on the Toonerville Trolley comic strip.; Final short solely directed by Burt Gillett.; The last cartoon ever made by the Van Beuren Corporation before its permanent closure afterwards.
