= The Sunshine Makers =

The Sunshine Makers is the title of two films:

- The Sunshine Makers (1935 film), an animated film
- The Sunshine Makers (2015 film), a documentary
