= Parrotville =

- Directed by: Burt Gillett; Steve Muffatti; Tom Palmer
- Produced by: Amedee J. Van Beuren
- Music by: Winston Sharples
- Color process: Cinecolor
- Production company: The Van Beuren Corporation
- Distributed by: RKO Radio Pictures, Inc.
- Running time: 7:13 — 7:57
- Country: United States
- Language: English

Parrotville is a theatrical cartoon series that was featured in the Rainbow Parade series. The series debuted on September 14, 1934 and made its last episode on June 28, 1935. All of the three episodes in the series were featured in the 200 Classic Cartoons Collector's Edition DVD released by Mill Creek Entertainment on October 14, 2008. The series was also featured in the Giant 600 Cartoon Collection DVD pack released by the same company on July 22 the same year.

All three cartoons were directed by Burt Gillett.

== Characters ==
- Mrs. Perkins - the main character of the series who appeared in every episode. She appears to be an energetic elderly parrot who is friendly to everyone but often gets into bad situations.
- The Captain - a friend of Mrs. Perkins who appears in all three episodes. In Parrotvile Fire Department, he appears as a fire chief, without his sailor hat, but his design and voice are the same.
- The Old Folks - a group of elderly parrots. They appeared in only one cartoon, Parrotville Old Folks, where they were invited to a party at their own "Old Folks Home".
- Black Parrot - a burglar who appeared in Parrotville Post Office. He tries to steal Mrs. Perkins' mail bag. Mrs. Perkins' children were inside the back causing the parrot to almost kidnap him. Matron catches him and traps him in the mail bag, he then sends him on the mail train.
- Mrs. Perkins' children - two children parrots, a boy and a girl, are being baby-sat by the Captain in Parrotville Post Office. They hid inside the mail bag when the Black Parrot was robbing the post office and were almost kidnapped.

== Filmography ==
=== Parrotville Fire Department ===
The first cartoon in the series (public domain).

The Parrotville Fire Department is a 1934 cartoon directed by Burt Gillett & Steve Muffatti. Produced For RKO Radio Pictures and would be the only time Steve Muffatti would direct a Parrotville cartoon.

The Captain is running a Fire Department working on his fire truck “ol’ betsy”. While his colleagues fix a firehose and play a game of poker. After they a get a call about a fire downtown, they head off to fight it. There, they battle against the fire but are outmatched and race back to the firehouse. There, they trap the flames inside of the structure until they realize that their own building is on fire.

=== Parrotville Old Folks ===
The second cartoon in the series (public domain).

Parrotville Old Folks is a 1935 cartoon directed by Burt Gillett & Tom Palmer. It was produced for RKO Radio Pictures and would be one of two Parrotville cartoons directing by Tom Palmer.

The Captain is taking a bath while his Goofy-like friend “Omar” irons out his overalls. While doing so, he gets a phone call from Mrs. Perkins stating how their invited to the Old Folks Home. They head there in the snow and get firewood once there to warm-up. Afterwards, they have a dinner with the residents and then have a shindig.

=== Parrotville Post Office ===
The third cartoon in the series (public domain).

Parrotville Post Office is a 1935 cartoon directed by Burt Gillett & Tom Palmer. It was produced for RKO Radio Pictures and would be the second of two Parrotville cartoons directing by Tom Palmer.

The Captain is working in a Post Office when Mrs. Perkins asks him to take care of her children. Later, he gets the call from the mail train and rushes to get the mail. However, before he unpacks it, he gets a telegraph stating that “The Black Parrot” mail robber is heading his way. He decides to guard the Post Office when he encounters the black parrot himself who tries to crack his vault. The black parrot fails each time. And the children defeat him and send him off to State Prison.
