= Swan Songs, First Flights =

Box set by Judy Garland
- Released: December 8, 2014
- Recorded: 1929–1969
- Label: Hallow

Judy Garland chronology
| Lost Tracks 1929–1959 (2010) | Swan Songs, First Flights (2014) | Lost Tracks 2 1936–1967 (2019) |

Swan Songs, First Flights (subtitled: "Her First and Last Recordings") is a compilation album by American singer and actress Judy Garland, released on December 8, 2014 by Hallow. The three-CD set brings together recordings from the beginning and final years of her career, including live performances, rehearsals, radio material and early studio recordings.

The collection features Garland's final concert performances in the United States and Europe, including her last concert in Copenhagen on March 25, 1969, as well as recordings from her 1968–69 engagement at London's Talk of the Town. The third disc also contains rarities dating from 1929 to 1935, among them soundtrack performances and a 1935 Decca test recording.

The set received favorable reviews from critics, who described the collection as a significant document of the final year of her life and praised the quality of the restored recordings, particularly the Copenhagen concert.

== Background and production ==
The project originated when music critic James Fisher gave audio restorer John H. Haley a poorly recorded bootleg of a June 1968 Garland concert at the Garden State Arts Center in New Jersey. After Haley attempted to improve it, Garland expert Lawrence Schulman asked him to restore two rare 1935 Decca test records. Impressed with the results, they discussed restoring additional live recordings and early material, developing the concept of bringing together Garland's earliest and final recordings, two periods of her career that were less extensively documented. Doremi Records agreed to release the collection as the first title on its new Hallow imprint. Alain Falasse proposed "Swan Songs" for the recordings from Garland's final years, while Schulman added "First Flights" for the early material from her childhood. The project took more than a year to complete as its scope expanded, although some planned television recordings were excluded after rights holders requested prohibitively high fees.

The restoration presented several technical challenges because many recordings came from amateur equipment or degraded tapes. Haley corrected playback speed and pitch, determined the appropriate keys, reduced audience noise, tape hiss and reverberation, and repaired dropouts. Some tracks went through 20 or 30 versions before he was satisfied with the results. The Copenhagen concert tapes, supplied as high-quality copies of the original Danmarks Radio broadcasts, were among the easiest to restore, whereas the recordings from London's Talk of the Town were particularly difficult because they came from different sources and varied in pitch and sound quality. The early recordings required separate treatment, including equalization and playback-speed adjustments.

== Album details ==
Swan Songs, First Flights is a three-CD boxed set featuring recordings from the final year of Judy Garland's life, alongside rarities from the beginning of her career. The set's 20-page booklet includes essays by producer Lawrence Schulman, audio restoration engineer John H. Haley, Scott Brogan and John Meyer.

The first disc includes Garland’s final American concert from July 20, 1968 at Philadelphia’'s (now-demolished) John F. Kennedy Stadium and bonus recordings from 1968, including a medley performed with Count Basie at the Philadelphia concert, private rehearsal recordings with pianist John Meyer, and selections from a New York tribute to Harold Arlen, Vincent Youmans and Noël Coward. Among the latter are performances conducted by Jay Blackton, including "Get Happy" and "Over the Rainbow", accompanied by Arlen himself.

The second disc premieres an expanded concert from Garland’s residency at London’s Talk of the Town from December 30, 1968 to February 1, 1969 and adds further recordings from Garland's London engagement at Talk of the Town, including additional performances of "I Belong to London" and "I'd Like to Hate Myself in the Morning", as well as three appearances on ITV's Sunday Night at the Palladium and two home recordings from May 1967, "How Do You Feel" and "My Man's Gone Now".

The third disc features the March 25, 1969 Copenhagen concert, Garland's final concert performance, recorded in a broadcast by Danmarks Radio. The concert is followed by an interview conducted by Hans Vangkilde for the radio station on March 26. The disc also includes "When Sunny Gets Blue", recorded during a rehearsal at New York's Half Note Club on June 15, 1969, with Mickey Deans accompanying Garland on piano. The collection concludes with eleven early recordings dating from 1929 to 1935, including soundtrack selections and a Decca test recording featuring Garland accompanied by her mother, Ethel Gumm, on piano.

== Critical reception ==
Professional ratings
Review scores
| Source | Rating |
|---|---|
| AllMusic | 3.5/5 stars |

AllMusic noted that Garland "was a fine vocalist and an engaging live performer to the very end". They commended the restoration work by John H. Haley, which made the recordings "sound as clear as new technology allows", and described the Copenhagen recordings as being "on a par with a commercially recorded live album of the era". Deming concluded that, for Garland enthusiasts, the set was "a treasure trove of rare recordings" that captures "a great artist at the end and the beginning of a truly remarkable career". Will Friedwald of The Wall Street Journal, described it as "the first comprehensive and credible release of material from the final year of her life". He praised Garland's performances, noting that "the glory of the Garland voice" remained evident in her final months, and described her Copenhagen performance of "Over the Rainbow" as "amazingly personal".

The Second Disc described it as "a thrilling new collection" that "places the focus squarely where it should be: on Garland’s art". They noted that the restored recordings "give new life to even the material that will be familiar to longtime collectors" and praised the performances as "captivating additions to Garland’s cherished live discography", highlighting her ability to convey "both sheer, unbridled optimism and devastating heartbreak in song". The ARSC Journal praised the set as "a remarkable salvage job", noting that Garland's voice, although diminished from its peak years, was "still extraordinary". They described her final performance of "Over the Rainbow" in Copenhagen as "a breathtaking moment" and concluded that the collection offered "an unprecedented record of the first and last hurrahs of a great artist".

== Track listing ==
Swan Songs, First Flights – Disc One
| No. | Title | Writer(s) | Taken from | Length |
|---|---|---|---|---|
| 1. | "Overture" | | John F. Kennedy Stadium, Philadelphia, July 20, 1968 | 4:30 |
| 2. | "There they are!" | | John F. Kennedy Stadium, Philadelphia, July 20, 1968 | 0:17 |
| 3. | "For Once in My Life" | Ron Miller; Orlando Murden | John F. Kennedy Stadium, Philadelphia, July 20, 1968 | 3:24 |
| 4. | "I feel marvelous." | | John F. Kennedy Stadium, Philadelphia, July 20, 1968 | 0:28 |
| 5. | "Medley: Almost Like Being in Love/This Can't Be Love" | Alan Jay Lerner; Frederick Loewe; Lorenz Hart; Richard Rodgers | John F. Kennedy Stadium, Philadelphia, July 20, 1968 | 3:04 |
| 6. | "Never Will I Marry" | Frank Loesser | John F. Kennedy Stadium, Philadelphia, July 20, 1968 | 2:05 |
| 7. | "I may get shorted off here." | | John F. Kennedy Stadium, Philadelphia, July 20, 1968 | 0:59 |
| 8. | "How Insensitive" | Antônio Carlos Jobim; Vinicius de Moraes; Norman Gimbel | John F. Kennedy Stadium, Philadelphia, July 20, 1968 | 3:53 |
| 9. | "Zing! Went the Strings of My Heart" | James F. Hanley; Ballard MacDonald | John F. Kennedy Stadium, Philadelphia, July 20, 1968 | 3:12 |
| 10. | "What Now My Love?" | Gilbert Bécaud; Pierre Delanoë; Carl Sigman | John F. Kennedy Stadium, Philadelphia, July 20, 1968 | 2:57 |
| 11. | "Maybe we could calm down and sing a couple of rather pretty songs." | | John F. Kennedy Stadium, Philadelphia, July 20, 1968 | 0:35 |
| 12. | "The Man I Love" | George Gershwin; Ira Gershwin | John F. Kennedy Stadium, Philadelphia, July 20, 1968 | 2:19 |
| 13. | "Make Someone Happy" | Jule Styne; Betty Comden; Adolph Green | John F. Kennedy Stadium, Philadelphia, July 20, 1968 | 1:49 |
| 14. | "Do I Love You?" | Cole Porter | John F. Kennedy Stadium, Philadelphia, July 20, 1968 | 2:38 |
| 15. | "I came from New York to see you too." | | John F. Kennedy Stadium, Philadelphia, July 20, 1968 | 0:40 |
| 16. | "By Myself" | Arthur Schwartz; Howard Dietz | John F. Kennedy Stadium, Philadelphia, July 20, 1968 | 4:05 |
| 17. | "I've gotten myself so ensnared." | | John F. Kennedy Stadium, Philadelphia, July 20, 1968 | 0:50 |
| 18. | "That's Entertainment!" | Arthur Schwartz; Howard Dietz | John F. Kennedy Stadium, Philadelphia, July 20, 1968 | 2:19 |
| 19. | "The Man That Got Away" | Harold Arlen; Ira Gershwin | John F. Kennedy Stadium, Philadelphia, July 20, 1968 | 0:20 |
| 20. | "Rock-a-Bye Your Baby with a Dixie Melody" | Jean Schwartz; Sam M. Lewis; Joe Young | John F. Kennedy Stadium, Philadelphia, July 20, 1968 | 4:21 |
| 21. | "For Once in My Life (reprise)" | Ron Miller; Orlando Murden | John F. Kennedy Stadium, Philadelphia, July 20, 1968 | 2:38 |
| 22. | "Orchestral "Over The Rainbow"" | Harold Arlen; E.Y. Harburg | John F. Kennedy Stadium, Philadelphia, July 20, 1968 | 1:12 |
| 23. | "Over The Rainbow" | Harold Arlen; E.Y. Harburg | John F. Kennedy Stadium, Philadelphia, July 20, 1968 | 1:44 |
| 24. | "Orchestral "Over The Rainbow"" | Harold Arlen; E.Y. Harburg | John F. Kennedy Stadium, Philadelphia, July 20, 1968 | 2:24 |
| 25. | "Medley: I Hear Music/The Sweetest Sounds/Strike Up the Band" (Bonus Track) | Burton Lane; Frank Loesser; Richard Rodgers; George Gershwin; Ira Gershwin | With Count Basie And His Orchestra, Philadelphia, July 20, 1968 | 3:40 |
| 26. | "I Loved Him, But He Didn't Love Me" (Bonus Track) | | Rehearsal, October 1968; John Meyer, Piano | 1:21 |
| 27. | "For Once in My Life" (Bonus Track) | Ron Miller; Orlando Murden | Rehearsal, October 1968; John Meyer, Piano | 2:29 |
| 28. | "The Man That Got Away" | Harold Arlen; Ira Gershwin | Tribute To Harold Arlen, Vincent Youmans, And Noel Coward, Lincoln Center, November 17, 1968, New York | 4:43 |
| 29. | "I think it's awfully good to be singing Mr. Arlen's songs because, well, we have sort of a casual relationship." | | Tribute To Harold Arlen, Vincent Youmans, And Noel Coward, Lincoln Center, November 17, 1968, New York | 0:59 |
| 30. | "It's A New World" | Harold Arlen; E.Y. Harburg | Tribute To Harold Arlen, Vincent Youmans, And Noel Coward, Lincoln Center, November 17, 1968, New York | 2:41 |
| 31. | "I really can't sit down for 'Get Happy'." | | Tribute To Harold Arlen, Vincent Youmans, And Noel Coward, Lincoln Center, November 17, 1968, New York | 0:12 |
| 32. | "Get Happy" | Harold Arlen; Ted Koehler | Tribute To Harold Arlen, Vincent Youmans, And Noel Coward, Lincoln Center, November 17, 1968, New York | 2:46 |
| 33. | "Orchestral "I Gotta Right to Sing the Blues"" | Harold Arlen; Ted Koehler | Tribute To Harold Arlen, Vincent Youmans, And Noel Coward, Lincoln Center, November 17, 1968, New York | 0:33 |
| 34. | "Now, what would you like to do?" | | Tribute To Harold Arlen, Vincent Youmans, And Noel Coward, Lincoln Center, November 17, 1968, New York | 0:39 |
| 35. | "Over the Rainbow" | Harold Arlen; E.Y. Harburg | Tribute To Harold Arlen, Vincent Youmans, And Noel Coward, Lincoln Center, November 17, 1968, New York | 3:41 |

Swan Songs, First Flights – Disc Two
| No. | Title | Writer(s) | Taken from | Length |
|---|---|---|---|---|
| 1. | "Overture" | | Talk of the Town London, December 30, 1968 – February 1, 1969 | 3:52 |
| 2. | "I Belong to London" | Ross Parker; Stan Freeman | Talk of the Town London, December 30, 1968 – February 1, 1969 | 5:02 |
| 3. | "Get Happy" | Harold Arlen; Ted Koehler | Talk of the Town London, December 30, 1968 – February 1, 1969 | 2:47 |
| 4. | "The Man That Got Away" | Harold Arlen; Ira Gershwin | Talk of the Town London, December 30, 1968 – February 1, 1969 | 3:57 |
| 5. | "I haven't been taught a new song since Clive Brook was a girl. Was he?" | | Talk of the Town London, December 30, 1968 – February 1, 1969 | 0:34 |
| 6. | "I'd Like to Hate Myself in the Morning" | John A. Meyer | Talk of the Town London, December 30, 1968 – February 1, 1969 | 2:18 |
| 7. | "There's no business like show business. Thank God." | | Talk of the Town London, December 30, 1968 – February 1, 1969 | 1:52 |
| 8. | "Just in Time" | Jule Styne; Betty Comden; Adolph Green | Talk of the Town London, December 30, 1968 – February 1, 1969 | 3:17 |
| 9. | "We'll do anything, you know." | | Talk of the Town London, December 30, 1968 – February 1, 1969 | 0:24 |
| 10. | "Just in Time (reprise)" | Jule Styne; Betty Comden; Adolph Green | Talk of the Town London, December 30, 1968 – February 1, 1969 | 1:44 |
| 11. | "I don't want to break my image." | | Talk of the Town London, December 30, 1968 – February 1, 1969 | 1:53 |
| 12. | "Medley: You Made Me Love You/For Me and My Gal/The Trolley Song" | James V. Monaco; Joseph McCarthy; George W. Meyer; Edgar Leslie; E. Ray Goetz; Ralph Blane; Hugh Martin | Talk of the Town London, December 30, 1968 – February 1, 1969 | 3:27 |
| 13. | "For Once in My Life" | Ron Miller; Orlando Murden | Talk of the Town London, December 30, 1968 – February 1, 1969 | 3:02 |
| 14. | "Don't fool around with Elizabeth Taylor's ring." | | Talk of the Town London, December 30, 1968 – February 1, 1969 | 0:48 |
| 15. | "San Francisco" | Bronislaw Kaper; Walter Jurmann; Gus Kahn | Talk of the Town London, December 30, 1968 – February 1, 1969 | 3:40 |
| 16. | "Nobody's eighteen anymore." | | Talk of the Town London, December 30, 1968 – February 1, 1969 | 1:04 |
| 17. | "Over the Rainbow" | Harold Arlen; E.Y. Harburg | Talk of the Town London, December 30, 1968 – February 1, 1969 | 3:28 |
| 18. | "Chicago" | Fred Fisher | Talk of the Town London, December 30, 1968 – February 1, 1969 | 3:06 |
| 19. | "I Belong to London (reprise)" (Bonus Track) | Ross Parker; Stan Freeman | Talk of the Town, London | 1:45 |
| 20. | "What are you smoking? Oh, well, get ready for the judgment day." (Bonus Track) | | Talk of the Town, London | 0:31 |
| 21. | "The Man That Got Away" (Bonus Track) | Harold Arlen; Ira Gershwin | Talk of the Town, London | 4:12 |
| 22. | "It was written by a man who is in the audience, a marvelous gentleman composer, John Meyer." (Bonus Track) | | Talk of the Town, London | 2:10 |
| 23. | "I'd Like to Hate Myself in the Morning" (Bonus Track) | John A. Meyer | Talk of the Town, London | 2:18 |
| 24. | "Medley: You Made Me Love You/For Me and My Gal/The Trolley Song" (Bonus Track) | James V. Monaco; Joseph McCarthy; George W. Meyer; Edgar Leslie; Hugh Martin; Ralph Blane | Talk of the Town, London | 3:19 |
| 25. | "For Once in My Life" (Bonus Track) | Ron Miller; Orlando Murden | Sunday Night at the Palladium, Itv, January 19, 1969, London | 2:48 |
| 26. | "Get Happy" (Bonus Track) | Harold Arlen; Ted Koehler | Sunday Night at the Palladium, Itv, January 19, 1969, London | 2:37 |
| 27. | "I Belong to London" (Bonus Track) | Ross Parker; Stan Freeman | Sunday Night at the Palladium, Itv, January 19, 1969, London | 4:45 |
| 28. | "My Man's Gone Now" (Bonus Track) | George Gershwin; DuBose Heyward | Home Recording at Bel Air, California Home, May 1967 | 3:33 |
| 29. | "How Do You Feel?" (Bonus Track) | | Home Recording at Bel Air, California Home, May 1967 | 4:05 |

Swan Songs, First Flights – Disc Three
| No. | Title | Writer(s) | Taken from | Length |
|---|---|---|---|---|
| 1. | "Overture" | | Sunday Night at the Palladium, ITV, January 19, 1969, London | 4:14 |
| 2. | "Get Happy" | Harold Arlen; Ted Koehler | Sunday Night at the Palladium, ITV, January 19, 1969, London | 2:52 |
| 3. | "Oh, dear, that's exhausting." | | Sunday Night at the Palladium, ITV, January 19, 1969, London | 0:35 |
| 4. | "Just in Time" | Jule Styne; Betty Comden; Adolph Green | Sunday Night at the Palladium, ITV, January 19, 1969, London | 2:39 |
| 5. | "What in the world do we do next?" | | Sunday Night at the Palladium, ITV, January 19, 1969, London | 0:12 |
| 6. | "The Man That Got Away" | Harold Arlen; Ira Gershwin | Sunday Night at the Palladium, ITV, January 19, 1969, London | 4:11 |
| 7. | "I haven't learned a new song since the original Vikings." | | Sunday Night at the Palladium, ITV, January 19, 1969, London | 0:45 |
| 8. | "I'd Like to Hate Myself in the Morning" | John A. Meyer | Sunday Night at the Palladium, ITV, January 19, 1969, London | 1:56 |
| 9. | "I have trouble with my English." | | Sunday Night at the Palladium, ITV, January 19, 1969, London | 1:47 |
| 10. | "For Once in My Life" | Ron Miller; Orlando Murden | Sunday Night at the Palladium, ITV, January 19, 1969, London | 2:39 |
| 11. | "Rock-a-Bye Your Baby with a Dixie Melody" | Jean Schwartz; Sam M. Lewis; Joe Young | Sunday Night at the Palladium, ITV, January 19, 1969, London | 2:28 |
| 12. | "Orchestral "Over the Rainbow"" | Harold Arlen; E.Y. Harburg | Sunday Night at the Palladium, ITV, January 19, 1969, London | 1:13 |
| 13. | "That's a nice tempo." | | Sunday Night at the Palladium, ITV, January 19, 1969, London | 1:14 |
| 14. | "Chicago" | Fred Fisher | Sunday Night at the Palladium, ITV, January 19, 1969, London | 3:06 |
| 15. | "San Francisco" | Bronislaw Kaper; Walter Jurmann; Gus Kahn | Sunday Night at the Palladium, ITV, January 19, 1969, London | 5:25 |
| 16. | "Shall we hit the song?" | | Sunday Night at the Palladium, ITV, January 19, 1969, London | 0:21 |
| 17. | "Over the Rainbow" | Harold Arlen; E.Y. Harburg | Sunday Night at the Palladium, ITV, January 19, 1969, London | 3:19 |
| 18. | "Interview by Hans Vangkilde for Danmarks Radio, March 26, 1969, King Frederick Hotel" (Bonus Track) | | | 12:35 |
| 19. | "I Love a Piano" (Bonus Track) | Irving Berlin | Rehearsal at Half Note Club, New York, June 15, 1969 | 0:54 |
| 20. | "When Sunny Gets Blue" (Bonus Track) | Marvin Fisher; Jack Segal | Rehearsal at Half Note Club, New York, June 15, 1969 | 2:58 |
| 21. | "That's the Good Old Sunny South" (Bonus Track) | Jack Yellen; Milton Ager | The Gumm Sisters; from The Big Revue, filmed June 11–13, 1929, Tec-Art Studios, Hollywood | 2:28 |
| 22. | "Where the Butterflies Kiss the Buttercups Goodnight" (Bonus Track) | Harry Pease; Charles O'Flynn; Ed G. Nelson | The Gumm Sisters; from A Holiday in Storyland, First National-Vitaphone, filmed November 1929, Burbank | 1:18 |
| 23. | "Blue Butterfly" (Bonus Track) | Johnny Tucker; Joe Schuster | Frances Gumm; from A Holiday in Storyland, First National-Vitaphone, filmed November 1929, Burbank | 1:58 |
| 24. | "Hang On to a Rainbow" (Bonus Track) | Bud Green; Sammy Stept | Frances Gumm; from The Wedding of Jack and Jill, First National-Vitaphone, filmed circa December 1929, Burbank | 1:08 |
| 25. | "The Land of Let's Pretend" (Bonus Track) | Grant Clarke; Harry Akst | The Gumm Sisters; from Bubbles, filmed January 1930 | 1:10 |
| 26. | "Bill" (Bonus Track) | Jerome Kern; P. G. Wodehouse | Instantaneous test acetates for Decca Records, recorded March 29, 1935, Hollywood; Ethel Gumm, piano | 3:23 |
| 27. | "Medley: On the Good Ship Lollipop/The Object of My Affection/Dinah" (Bonus Track) | Richard A. Whiting; Sidney Clare; Dorothy Fields; J. Fred Coots; Edgar Leslie; Sam M. Lewis | Instantaneous test acetates for Decca Records, recorded March 29, 1935, Hollywood; Ethel Gumm, piano | 2:53 |
| 28. | "La Cucaracha" (Bonus Track) | Traditional | The Garland Sisters; from La Fiesta de Santa Barbara, filmed August 12, 1935, Culver City | 1:23 |
| 29. | "I'm Feelin' Like a Million" (Bonus Track) | Nacio Herb Brown; Arthur Freed | Rehearsal on 78-rpm acetate, circa late summer/early fall 1937, Culver City; Roger Edens, piano | 2:50 |
| 30. | "Silent Night" (Bonus Track) | Franz Xaver Gruber; Joseph Mohr | From Silent Night, filmed November 6–8, 1937, Culver City | 1:44 |
| 31. | "If I Forget You" (Bonus Track) | Irving Caesar | From If I Forget You, filmed early 1940, Culver City | 3:11 |

== Personnel ==
Credits adapted from Swan Songs, First Flights – Her First and Last Recordings CD.

- Remastered by John. H. Haley
- Liner notes by Lawrence Schulman
- Technical notes by John H. Haley
- Discographical notes by Scott Brogan
- Composer's notes by John Meyer
- Brochure layout by Lawrence Schulman, design by Andrew Aitken
