= Nan Mason =

Painter and photographer

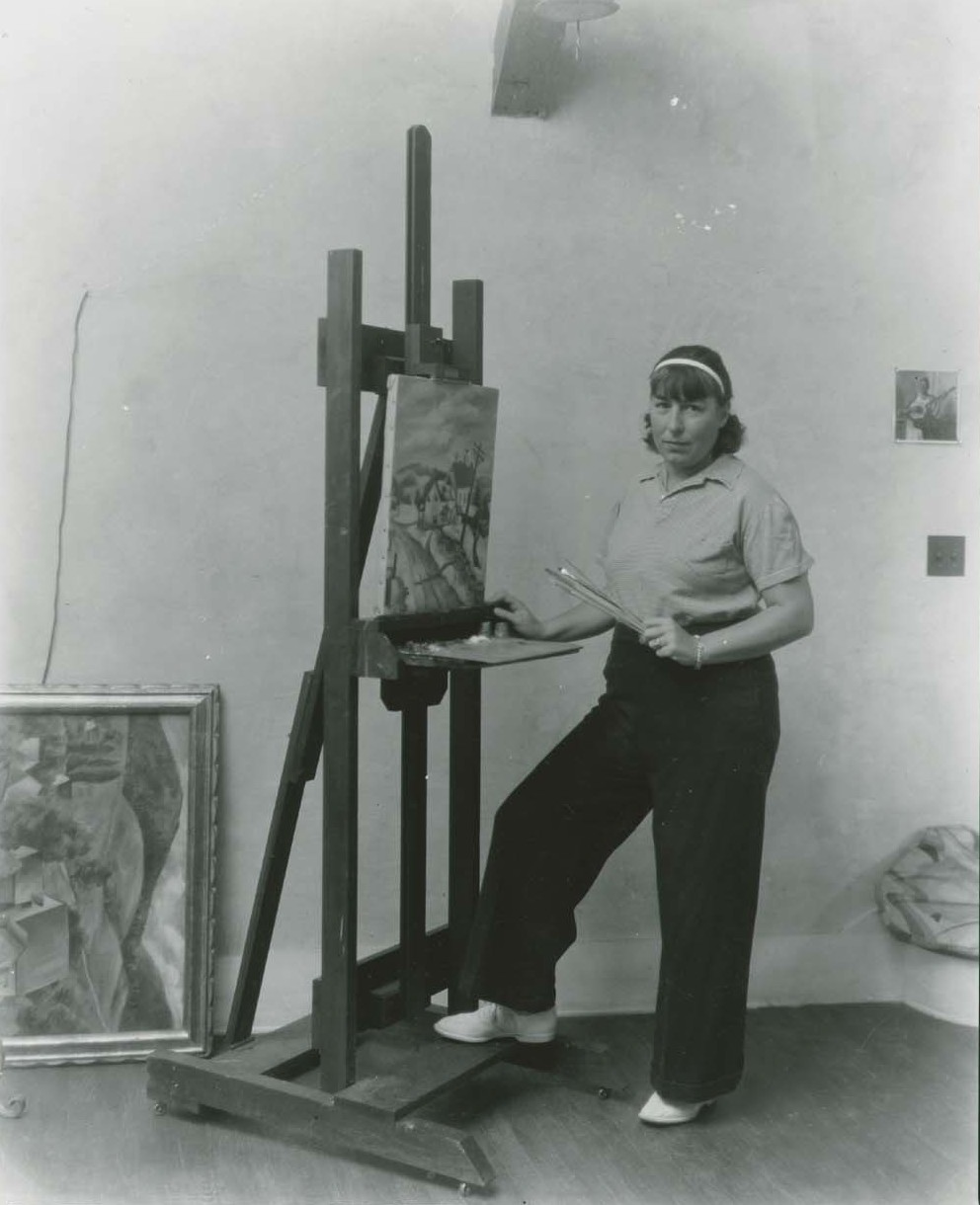
Nan Mason, American painter, 1896–1982, at work in her studio, Woodstock, New York

Nan Mason (July 17, 1896 – March 2, 1982) was an American painter and photographer.

== Early life ==
Nan Mason was born in New York City on July 17, 1896.

== Career ==
As a painter, Nam Mason was part of the Woodstock Artist Colony and also that of Carmel-by-the-Sea, California and Anna Maria Island, Florida. Mason specialized in enamel painting, adopting "semi abstract urban motifs and bolder colors", with a cubist movement influence.

Mason was on the Board of Trustees of the Woodstock Guild of Craftsmen.

During the Depression of the 1930s, Mason and Hervey opened their own shop, "Gaylite Candles", which gathered several stores in Manhattan, including Hammacher Schlemmer; the candles itself were hand-made by Mason.

In 2015, the James Cox Gallery at Woodstock displayed the exhibition Wilna Hervey & Nan Mason: Two Woodstock Originals.

== Personal life ==
Mason's first partner, Arthur Ryan, died of pneumonia before their wedding.

In the 1920s she became the long-time partner of actress Wilna Hervey. They met on the set in Pennsylvania, Mason was the daughter of Hervey's co-star Dan Mason. At first they lived with Mason's father, in a home in Audubon, Pennsylvania, and later moved together in a studio home in Bearsville, New York, their principal home until Hervey's death in 1979.

They were part of the artists community in Woodstock, New York, and during the summers they moved to Carmel, California, and Manatee County, Florida. Every year they hosted an annual costume party during which they auctioned art works to raise money for charity.

They help raising their nephew, future Lt. Col. Bruce Campbell Cator, who lived with them in Bearsville for a period. He died on July 7, 1960.

In 1962, Hervey and Mason inherited the main share of Eugene Speicher's estate. Speicher was a noted Woodstock artist.

They are buried side by side at Artists Cemetery, Woodstock, New York.

== Legacy ==
In 2015, Joseph P. Eckhardt published Living Large: Wilna Hervey and Nan Mason, a biography retelling the love story of Hervey and Mason.
