= Ted Eshbaugh =

American filmmaker

- Born: February 5, 1906; Des Moines, Iowa
- Died: July 4, 1969 (aged 63); New York, New York
- Education: Museum of Fine Arts, Boston Art Institute of Chicago
- Notable work: Goofy Goat; The Wizard of Oz; The Sunshine Makers

Ted Eshbaugh (February 5, 1906 – July 4, 1969) was an American animation filmmaker, best known as one of the first filmmakers to experiment with color sound cartoons in the early 1930s, which included Goofy Goat and The Wizard of Oz.

== Early life ==
Eshbaugh was born in Des Moines, Iowa on February 4, 1906 to Edwin F. and Zada (Kinear) Eshbaugh. Ted's father worked in the farm insurance business and was transferred to Sioux City when Ted was about two years old. Eshbaugh won a scholarship for the Chicago Art Institute at age 7, and later on he won another at the Boston Art Museum. The Los Angeles City Directory of 1923 lists Ted as an artist living with his widowed mother.

== Career ==
=== Los Angeles Studio ===
Eshbaugh had spent the late 20s and early 30s in Los Angeles experimenting with color cartoons with business tycoon J.R. Booth, whom he met at the Boston Art Museum, and Multicolor, a color film processor evolved from the Prizma Color system. When Eshbaugh perfected the cartoon process, he started an independent studio and employed multiple artists in 1931 to help make cartoons featuring this process, including budding animators Pete Burness and Jack Zander. The result of this was Goofy Goat, which many historians have debated to be the first color sound cartoon released in the United States. Premiered in March 1932 at Loew's State, it was originally meant to be the first of a series of thirteen cartoons, which ultimately did not pan out. That said, Eshbaugh's cost-effective color process did lay the foundation for processes of other two-color cartoons throughout the 30s, namely ones using the Cinecolor process which Multicolor ultimately folded into.

Later in 1931, Eshbaugh and Booth used the Multicolor process to try kickstarting a series of cartoons called "Musicolor Fantasies", and collaborated with the Technicolor Corporation in hopes to produce another series of full-color cartoons based on the Wizard of Oz novel. These efforts did not pan out either, and the latter turned out to be tumultuous in the long run. Rights were secured for the Wizard of Oz cartoons from Col. Frank Baum, son of the novel's author L. Frank Baum, and production went underway, however Technicolor had signed an exclusive deal with Walt Disney to utilize the three-color process being used for the Oz shorts, which ultimately shut down releases of Eshbaugh's cartoon series. Only one cartoon was finished out of each of Eshbaugh's proposed Oz and Fantasies cartoon series, The Wizard of Oz and The Snowman. Issues about the production of Oz were taken to Federal Court, where Baum restrained Eshbaugh and Technicolor from releasing the cartoon, citing reasons as failure to meet deadlines.

=== Van Beuren Studio ===
In 1934, when Burt Gillett was hired from Disney to upgrade the product of the cartoon division of the Van Beuren Studio in New York, Eshbaugh was recruited to help direct the Rainbow Parades, a series of color cartoons started to compete with Walt Disney's Silly Symphony cartoons. Because Disney still had exclusive rights to the three-color Technicolor process, these cartoons were produced in two-color Cinecolor, the process which Multicolor folded into in 1932 and Eshbaugh initially helped tailor for cartoons with Goofy Goat. The shorts premiered at the Radio City Music Hall, and entries like Pastry Town Wedding and The Sunshine Makers have been fondly remembered by fans for their lavish animation and color styling. Ultimately, Eshbaugh left the studio in 1935.

=== New York Studio ===
After leaving Van Beuren, Eshbaugh set up operations for another independent animation studio, this time in New York, which became the permanent location. One of the first animated productions of this studio was for a political campaign satirizing Franklin D. Roosevelt's New Deal, titled The Amateur Fire Brigade: A Parable of the New Deal, made during the 1936 presidential election. According to reports, the first version of this film was screened by film censors in Ohio who found the original film too grotesquely focused on a caricature of Roosevelt. The pressure group Sentinels of the Republic fought with the censors demand to tone the caricature down, but failed, resulting in a second version of the film, A Fable of the New Deal.

Other early projects included a proposed series of Technicolor cartoons featuring an animal character named Peter Panda, inspired by the surge of imports and popularity of giant pandas in western countries, however there are no films surfaced to confirm completion of this series. Eshbaugh still experimented with color film at this point, as in 1939, he produced an animated film commissioned by Planters Nut & Chocolate Co. exclusively in 16 mm color film, proposed as the first of its kind. This film, Mr. Peanut and His Family Tree, was shown at Planters' 1939 World's Fair exhibits. In the early 40s, he repackaged cartoons he directed at the Van Beuren Studio with new animation for advertising companies like Cushman Son's and Borden's, as copyrights had lapsed for those films when Amedee J. Van Beuren died. In 1941, Ted Eshbaugh allegedly failed to comply with the agreed upon labor conditions of the Screen Actors Guild, which put his studio on their "unfair" list.

At the beginning of World War II in America, Eshbaugh's studio geared operations towards cartoons produced for the war effort. He worked on films for the US Navy throughout the war, including an animated sequence for the training film Aerial Gunnery, as well as animated promotions like Sammy Salvage. He created a character named Cap'n Cub to star in a proposed series of war-themed cartoon shorts for theatrical release. Copyrights were registered on May 8, 1941, and the first cartoon, Cap'n Cub Blasts the Japs, was released at the end of the war in 1945 by Film Classics to 3,000 theaters, with a second cartoon reportedly completed.

Returning to commercial productions after war's end, Ted Eshbaugh Studios operated into the early 1960s. One of the studio's more notable postwar products was a 1957 railroad safety short for the Baltimore & Ohio Railroad, Otto Nobetter and the Railroad Gang, which is now presumed lost.

== Selected filmography ==
- Goofy Goat (1931)
- The Snowman (1933)
- The Wizard of Oz (1933)
- Pastry Town Wedding (1934)
- The Sunshine Makers (1935)
- Japanese Lanterns (1935)
- A Fable of the New Deal (1936)
- Tea Pot Town (1936)
- Wonder Bakers at the World's Fair (1939)
- Mr. Peanut and His Family Tree (1939)
- Sammy Salvage (1943)
- Cap'n Cub (1945)
- Ready Made Magic (1946)
- The White Guard (1947)
- The Pied Piper of Chiclet Town (1948)
- Otto Nobetter and the Railroad Gang (1957)
