= Burt Gillett's Toddle Tales =

Theatrical cartoon series

Burt Gillett‘s Toddle Tales
- The title card to the Toddle Tales cartoons. From “A Little Bird Told Me” released in 1934.
- Directed by: Burt Gillett; James Tyer; Steve Muffati
- Produced by: Amedee J. Van Beuren
- Music by: Winston Sharples
- Production company: The Van Beuren Corporation
- Distributed by: RKO Radio Pictures
- Release date: 1934
- Running time: 8 – 9 minutes
- Country: United States
- Language: English

Burt Gillett's Toddle Tales was a short-lived theatrical cartoon series by The Van Beuren Corporation that lasted from June 29 to September 7, 1934. The three sole films released in the series – Grandfather's Clock, Along Came A Duck, and A Little Bird Told Me – combined live-action and animation.

The musical score was done by Winston Sharples and was distributed by RKO Radio Pictures.

== Shorts ==
=== Grandfather's Clock ===
The first cartoon in the series (Public Domain)

Grandfather’s Clock is a 1934 cartoon directed by Burt Gillett & James Tyer. It was produced for RKO Radio Pictures and theatrically released on June 29, 1934.

In the short, a little girl and her baby brother meet a grandfather clock who introduces them to clock children and show them what they do.

=== Along Came A Duck ===
The second cartoon in the series (Public Domain)

Along Came A Duck is a 1934 cartoon directed by Burt Gillett & Steve Muffatti. Produced for RKO Radio Pictures, it would be the only time Steve Muffatti would direct a Toddle Tales cartoon. Theatrically released on August 10, 1934.

In the short, a little boy chases a poor duck to the pond where he runs into an animated croaking and singing bullfrog. Then the bullfrog tells the little boy the story of how he and the duck met years ago.

=== A Little Bird Told Me ===
The third cartoon in the series (Public Domain)

A Little Bird Told Me is a 1934 cartoon directed by Burt Gillett & James Tyer. It was produced for RKO Radio Pictures and theatrically released on September 7, 1934.

In the short, little bird reporters and photographers led by "Walter Finchell" published the story of the real life boy that had his hands in the jam in the newspaper which was printed on leaves.
