= Edith Vernick =

American animator (1906–1992)

Edith Ida Vernick (April 18, 1906 – May 25, 1992) was a Ukrainian-American animator, hired by the Fleischer Studios in the mid-1920s and became the In between Department Supervisor. Her animation work is uncredited on The Fresh Vegetable Mystery from 1939. Although Lillian Friedman Astor is generally considered the first female American animator, Vernick's employment at the Fleischer Studios preceded Friedman's in the 1920s.

== Early life ==
Born on April 18, 1906, in Kyiv as Ida Wernick to Orthodox Jews, the Vernick's fled to New York City in order to escape from the 1905 Russian Revolution. She studied art at Washington Irving High School and took a job at a lampshade factory once she graduated.

== Career ==
After her job at a lampshade factory, Out of the Inkwell Studios hired Vernick in 1923. She first was a cel cutter, then a washer, then an opaquer, and finally an inker. In 1931, she was put in charge of the inbetweening unit and by 1937 she was an assistant animator. She then supervised the assistant animation department for Gulliver's Travels. In 1942, she joined the army during World War II and eventually ended up as a sergeant at the Women's Army Corps. Edith eventually went out of the army in the summer of 1945. She briefly was at the Metro-Goldwyn-Mayer cartoon studio as a supervisor for the assistant animators for the short The Cat Concerto. Edith worked at Famous Studios from 1953 to December 1955. In 1955, Vernick was once again at the MGM cartoon studio, this time as a checker, working closely with Michael Lah on the short Grin It and Share It. She then briefly did work for TV Spots, doing commercial work. At the start of 1958 she was working for Hanna-Barbera for The Huckleberry Hound Show, and then she took a vacation in Hawaii that year. Her final piece of work she did for the animation industry was Bozo: The World's Most Famous Clown at Larry Harmon Productions.

== Later life and death ==
She briefly landed a job at the RCA as a file clerk, until layoffs happened there. In November 1965 she worked at the Federal Aviation Administration and was assigned at the National Aviation Facilities Experimental Center. In 1985, Vernick received a Golden Award for her achievements in the animation industry. She died on May 25, 1992, at the age of 86.
