= The Sunshine Makers (1935 film) =

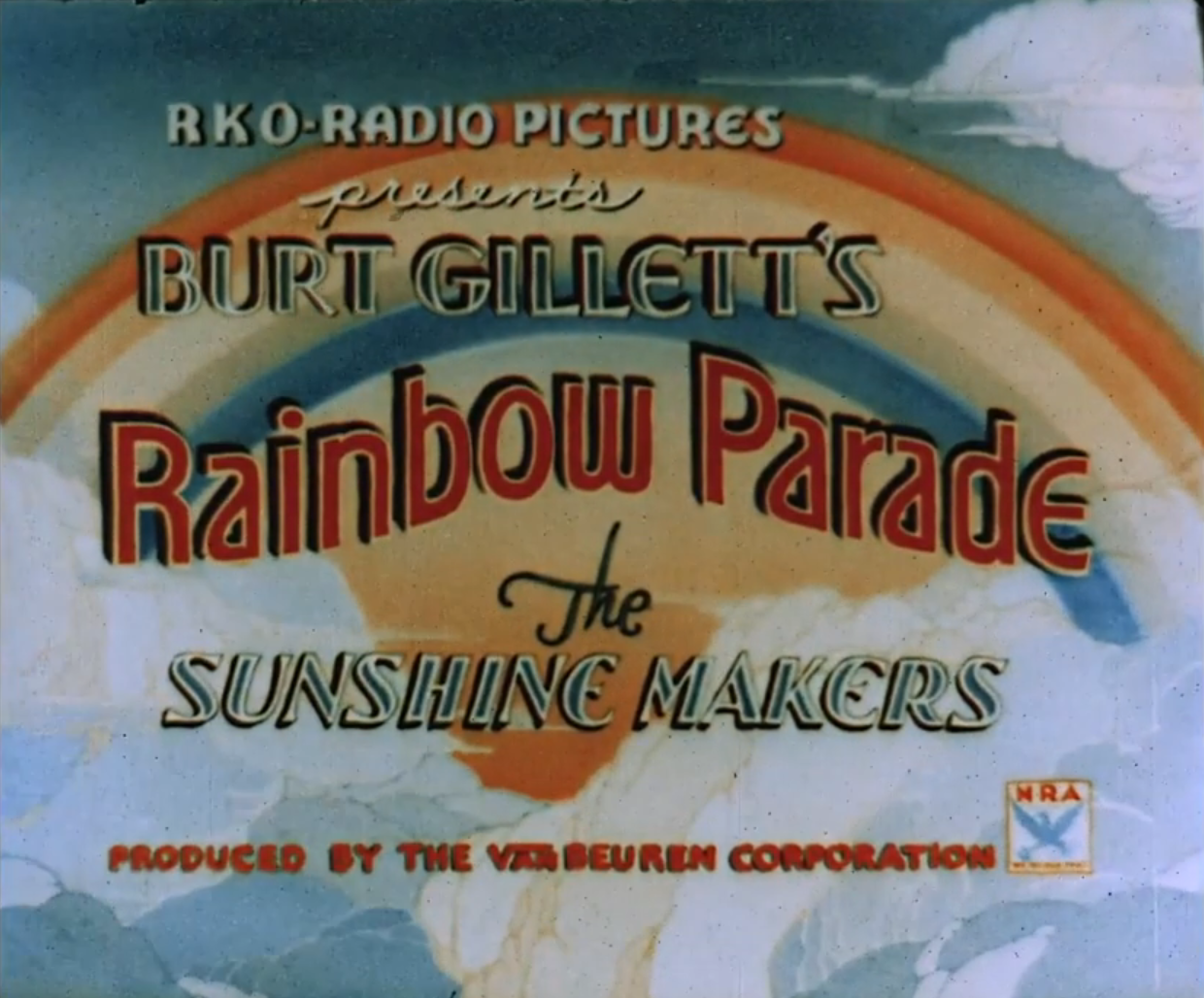
- Title card
- Directed by: Burt Gillett; Ted Eshbaugh
- Produced by: Amadee J. Van Beuren
- Starring: Gus Wickie
- Music by: Winston Sharples
- Animation by: Thomas Goodson; Isadore Klein; Bill Littlejohn; Vernon Stallings; Carlo Vinci; Jack Zander (all uncredited)
- Layouts by: Art Bartsch (uncredited)
- Color process: Cinecolor
- Production company: Van Beuren Studios
- Distributed by: RKO Radio Pictures; Borden (reissue)
- Release date: January 11, 1935

The Sunshine Makers is a 1935 animated short film directed by Burt Gillett and Ted Eshbaugh, reissued and sponsored by the food and beverage producer Borden in 1940. It was originally released as a part of the Rainbow Parade series, produced by Van Beuren Studios.

== Plot ==
The Sunshine Makers

Five red-dressed cheerful gnomes come out of their houses singing a song praising the Sun while marching up the hill. They go inside and bottle sunlight into a special milk. One of the gnomes rides a cart pulled by a cricket and sings a song and puts the bottles by the door and takes the scroll. A grumpy blue-dressed top-hat-wearing goblin shoots the hat off the gnome with a bow and arrow and the hat flies to a tree. Another arrow flies over the gnome's head, and the gnome throws a bottle at the goblin, who ends up having sunshine on his back and runs back home to the goblin swamp.

At the dark swamp, a small group of goblins sing a gloomy song "We're happy when we're sad. We're always feeling bad". An owl alerts the goblins of the incoming danger of sunlight and the goblins run into their houses. The afflicted goblin buries his shirt in the ground and bangs on a gong. The goblins get sprayers to erase the sunshine's power outside the swamp with toxins. One of the gnomes toots a horn and the rest of the gnomes use bottles to shoot them through a cannon at the goblins. The milk bottles fly everywhere, a vulture turns into a jay, and the goblins run to their houses. The gnomes on dragonflies drop bottles and make a fountain of water that brightens up the goblins' swamp. The gnomes struggle to get the goblins into the fountain, with one protesting "I don't wanna be happy. I wanna be sad". The goblins drink its milk and the gnomes and now-happy goblins start singing together.

== Legacy ==
In The Encyclopedia of American Animated Television Shows, David Perlmutter likened the 1980s Rainbow Brite series to this short.
