= Wilna Hervey =

American actress (1894–1979)

Wilna Webster Hervey
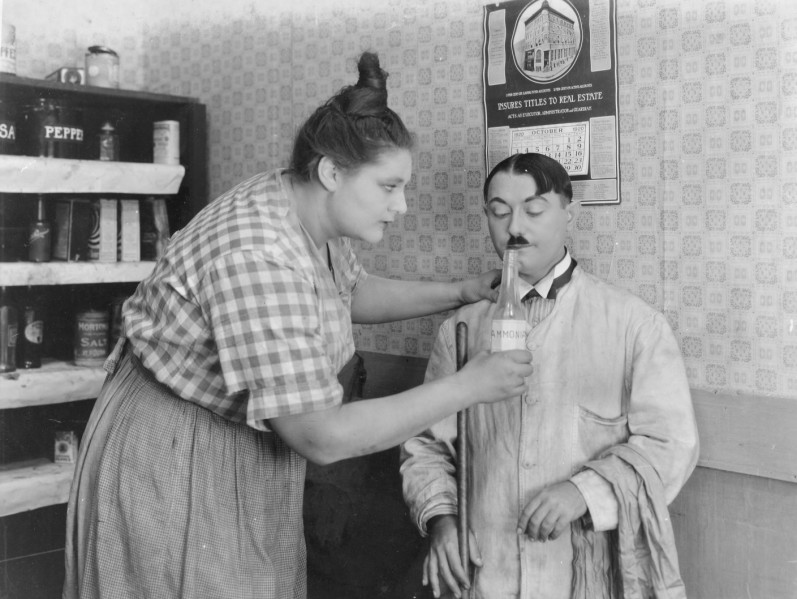
- Wilna Hervey as Katrinka from the Toonerville Trolley movies
- Born: October 3, 1894; San Francisco
- Died: March 6, 1979 (aged 84); Bradenton, Florida
- Other name: Wilna Wilde
- Occupations: Actress, artist

Wilna Hervey (October 3, 1894 – March 6, 1979), also known as Wilna Wilde, was an American film actress. She starred in a series of silent slapstick films in the 1920s before becoming part of the artist community in Woodstock, New York with her partner Nan Mason.

== Early life ==
Known to friends and family as "Willie," Wilna Hervey was the only child of the marriage of William Russell Hervey and Anna Van Horn Traphagen. She grew up in affluent circumstances at Beach Ninth Street, Far Rockaway.

During her youth in late 1910s, Hervey studied at the Art Students League in New York City, Winold Reiss' studio at 4 Christopher Street, New York City, and in Woodstock, New York during the summer of 1918. Her acting career began with a few silent movie roles at the Vitagraph Studios in Brooklyn as early as 1916; for her artistic pursuits Hervey adopted the professional name "Wilna Wilde."

== Professional career ==
In 1919, she was cast in the role of "The Powerful Katrinka" in The Toonerville Trolley silent film series based on Fontaine Fox's Toonerville Folks comic strip, which was produced by Siegmund Lubin's Betzwood Motion Picture Studios in Pennsylvania. Much of the slapstick comedy in the series revolves around Hervey's imposing physical stature—she stood 6 feet 3 inches (1.91 m)—in contrast with her diminutive male co-stars.

While Hervey was in Pennsylvania working on the production, she met the painter Nan Mason (1896-1982), the daughter of her co-star Dan Mason, who played the Skipper. Nan and Hervey became life partners, remaining together until Hervey's death in 1979.

When the Toonerville Trolley films ceased production in 1921, Hervey and Dan Mason reprised a version of their characters for the Plum Center Comedies, an unofficial knockoff comedy series produced by the Paul Gerson Pictures Corporation in California. This time Hervey played the "Amazonian baggage smasher" Tillie Overton, who was clearly inspired by the Powerful Katrinka.

Around 1919-1920, Hervey's father bought her a studio in Bearsville, New York. She and Nan Mason split their time between painting and farming in Woodstock, New York, and pursuing acting opportunities in California, from 1922 to 1929. They became popular members of the Woodstock artists community, and both found some artistic success there during the 1960s. During the harsh New York winters they also spent time in Carmel, California, and Manatee County, Florida.

== Death ==
After years of declining health in the 1970s, Hervey died at the Manatee Memorial Hospital near her Bradenton, Florida home on March 6, 1979. She is buried alongside Nan Mason at Artists Cemetery in Woodstock, New York. Hervey's personal papers, which include an unpublished manuscript of her memoirs, are held at the Archives of American Art, Smithsonian Institution.
