= It's a Hap-Hap-Happy Day =

1939 song by Timberg, Sharples and Neiburg

"It's a Hap-Hap-Happy Day" is a popular song with music by Sammy Timberg and Winston Sharples and words by Al J. Neiburg. It was featured in the animated feature film Gulliver's Travels in 1939. It was a hit in the UK in 1940 during the Battle of Britain, having been played heavily on BBC radio.

== Notable recordings ==
- Bob Zurke & His Delta Rhythm Band
- Arthur Askey
- Guy Lombardo and His Royal Canadians
- Judy Garland
