= Toonerville, Colorado =

Unincorporated community in Bent County, CO, USA

Coordinates: 37°46′30″N 103°09′51″W

Toonerville is an unincorporated community in Bent County, Colorado, United States.

== History ==
The community was named after Toonerville Folks, a comic strip.
