= Goofy Goat =

1931 film

- Directed by: Ted Eshbaugh
- Animation by: Pete Burness; Jack Zander; Cal Dalton; Andrew Hutchinson
- Color process: Multicolor
- Production company: Ted Eshbaugh Studios
- Release date: July 6, 1931
- Running time: 7 min 47 sec (one reel)
- Country: United States
- Language: English

Goofy Goat is a 1931 American animated short film produced by Ted Eshbaugh Studios. This film is said to be among the first color cartoons made, however only a black-and-white version survives, with its reissued name, Goofy Goat Antics.

== Plot ==
The goat is driving his car, which is stuck in a traffic jam behind a fat pig. The goat manages to make it to the Glee Club, where he and his friends put on a little show.

== Production ==
Ted Eshbaugh produced this cartoon as the pilot of a proposed series to test out a color process for animated cartoons he had been collaborating with film color processor Multicolor (later Cinecolor) on perfecting. A team of workers, including animators Jack Zander and Pete Burness and musical composer Carl Stalling, were hired to help produce the series, and the properties were registered for copyright on July 6, 1931. It was premiered at Loew's State on March 8, 1932, however with no means of distribution at that time, and the cartoon never spawned a full series.
