= The Wizard of Oz (1933 film) =

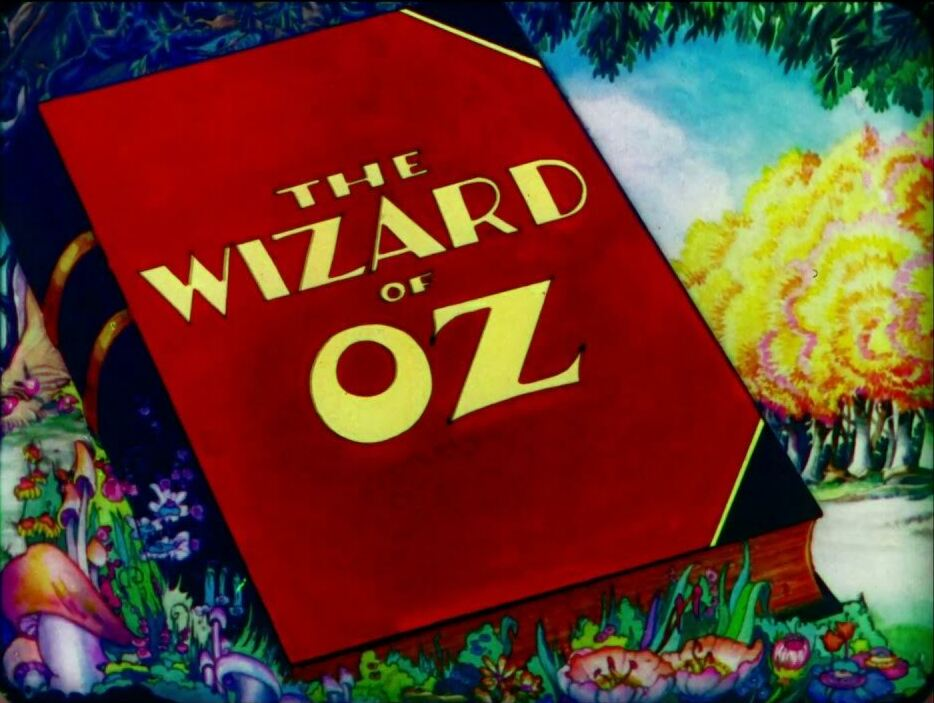
- The Wizard of Oz (1933), title card
- Directed by: Ted Eshbaugh
- Written by: Col. Frank Baum
- Based on: The Wonderful Wizard of Oz; 1900 novel by L. Frank Baum
- Produced by: J.R. Booth; Ted Eshbaugh
- Music by: Carl W. Stalling
- Animation by: Frank Tipper; Bill Mason; Cal Dalton; Vet Anderson "Hutch"
- Color process: Technicolor
- Production company: Ted Eshbaugh Studios
- Distributed by: Film Laboratories of Canada
- Release date: June 19, 1933
- Running time: 9 minutes
- Countries: Canada; United States
- Language: English

The Wizard of Oz is a 1933 Canadian-American animated short film directed by Ted Eshbaugh. The story is credited to "Col. Frank Baum." Frank Joslyn Baum, a lieutenant colonel in the United States Army and eldest son of writer L. Frank Baum, was involved in the film's production, and may have had an involvement in the film's script, which is loosely inspired by the elder Baum's 1900 novel, The Wonderful Wizard of Oz. It runs approximately eight and a half minutes and is nearly wordless, working mainly with arrangements of classical music created by Carl W. Stalling. The film is considered to potentially be the first full color animated film.

== Production ==
The film was known to be in production during October, 1932. The film was originally made in Technicolor, but because it was made without proper licensing from the Technicolor Corporation (which limited use of its 3-strip process to Disney), it never received a theatrical release in color and was shown in Black & White instead.

== Plot ==
The Wizard of Oz (1933) by Ted Eshbaugh

In the plains of Kansas, Dorothy and her dog, Toto were living alone in a shambling farm house when a tornado sweeps through, lifting the house into the sky and causing Dorothy and Toto to fall to the ground. They end up tumbling into the land of Oz, landing atop a friendly Scarecrow and freeing him of his pole. The Scarecrow invites the two on a stroll and both he and Dorothy play fetch with Toto, but the stick ends up hitting something metal. The trio go to investigate and find a rusted up Tin Woodman covered in flower vines and cobwebs, indicating that he had not moved in ages. After examining him, the Scarecrow uses the oil can on the Tin Woodman's head to bring him back to life and then uses his own straw to clean the woodman up. Grateful to them for waking him after so long, the Tin Woodman joins the group and directs them to the Emerald City. After the four watch mating rituals of various animals (set to strains of Camille Saint-Saëns's "The Swan"), they are graciously welcomed into the city. A creature resembling the A-B-Sea Serpent of The Royal Book of Oz extends itself as stairsteps for Dorothy to enter a coach as part of a parade by the city's inhabitants.

Once they reach the palace, living suits of armor appear and sing to them about the city's ruler, the Wizard of Oz, and allow them to enter. They eventually meet the wizard, a cackling white-bearded man in a starry black robe, conical hat and green glasses who uses a wand to produce custom seats for each of the four travelers. For the Tin Woodsman, a tree; for the Scarecrow, a crow; for Dorothy a golden chair with a crown. For Toto, a chair designed to resemble a cat.

He then performs a magic show with magic hats and dolls, which entertains his guests, and then creates a hen that tips over a vial of green liquid, which Toto laps up, causing him to crow like a rooster. The hen then lays several eggs that the wizard hatches into various hybrids of birds and mammals. The last egg was so small that the wizard didn't want to hatch it, but the hen insisted, causing the wizard to drop his wand. The egg then begins growing bigger and bigger, and the wizard went to pick up his wand, only for Toto to pick it up and run away with it, with the wizard and Dorothy going after him.

As they chase Toto throughout the palace, the Tin Woodman and the Scarecrow deal with the growing egg, which was wrecking the palace. The Tin Woodman tries using his ax to break the egg, but it's destroyed upon impact, so the Scarecrow grabs a sword and mace from a display for them to use, but they break too. They continue to try to break egg while the wizard and Dorothy continue to chase Toto with the wand, eventually chasing him around the egg itself. Toto eventually realizes the situation and gives the Tin Woodman the wand, which he uses to finally hatch the egg, revealing a tiny chick, which the mother hen embraces while clucking "Rock-a-bye Baby". Dorothy and the others witness this and joins the chorus with her.

== Home video ==
There were many home media releases of the film, including Betamax, VHS, Laserdisc, CED, DVD, HD DVD and Blu-ray Disc, usually printed and shown in black-and-white, not technicolor. Cassette copies are usually at slow speeds, and often overexposed and poorly framed, while disc copies are all at faster speeds, and underexposed and correctly framed. The first known commercial release was in Canada in 1985, on Betamax, VHS and Laserdisc, through the efforts of Fred M. Meyer, longtime Secretary of The International Wizard of Oz Club. This is not an original color print, but has been colored to match the original intent of the filmmakers, which, as in the MGM film that followed, had the film go from black and white to color upon Dorothy's arrival in Oz. Cassette copies also contained a stray hair during the parade sequence, while the LaserDisc copies did not.

The short is included in the 2005 3-Disc Collector's Edition of the more popular 1939 feature film of the same name, while a brief 2-minute clip is included on the 1999 DVD release and as a bonus on the 1993 Ultimate Oz VHS and LaserDisc deluxe release.

The short was released again in 2010 as part of Mill Creek Entertainment's DVD compilation, 200 Classic Cartoons.

Thunderbean Animation restored and remastered the cartoon from its original negatives and released the new colourful print on a DVD and Blu-ray combo pack under the title Technicolor Dreams and Black & White Nightmares in 2014.
