= Toonerville, Kentucky =

Unincorporated community in Kentucky, United States

Coordinates: 37°22′12″N 82°13′51″W

Toonerville is an unincorporated community in Pike County, in the U.S. state of Kentucky, some 301 mi (or 485 km) west of Washington, the country's capital. It is part of a bigger unincorporated community called Mouthcard.

== History ==
The community was named after Toonerville Folks, a comic strip.
