= Tarantella (1940 film) =

- Directed by: Mary Ellen Bute
- Release date: 1940
- Running time: 5 minutes
- Country: United States
- Language: English

Tarantella is a five-minute color, avant-garde animated short film created by Mary Ellen Bute, a pioneer of visual music and electronic art in experimental cinema.

== Contents ==
With piano accompaniment by Edwin Gerschefski, "Tarantella" features rich reds and blues that Bute uses to signify a lighter mood, while her syncopated spirals, shards, lines and squiggles dance exuberantly to Gerschefski's modern beat. Bute produced more than a dozen short films between the 1930s and the 1950s and once described herself as a "designer of kinetic abstractions" who sought to "bring to the eyes a combination of visual forms unfolding with the … rhythmic cadences of music." Bute's work influenced many other filmmakers working with abstract animation during the 1930s and 1940s, and with experimental electronic imagery in the 1950s.

== National Film Registry ==
In 2010, the film was selected for preservation in the National Film Registry by the Library of Congress.
