= Commonwealth Pictures =

Commonwealth Pictures was a motion picture company that primarily dealt with reissues of old features and shorts.

The company was formed by Samuel Goldstein and Mortimer Sackett in 1937 as division of Guaranteed Pictures Company, Inc. In 1941, they purchased shorts and features from the Van Beuren Studios, which used to handle short subjects in the 1930s for RKO Radio Pictures. Some of these films from Van Beuren were reissued silent films purchased by Van Beuren. Rainbow Parade cartoons were part of this package as well. Commonwealth retitled the cartoons, removing the Van Beuren openings, and just going with a plain title card. Also, the Ub Iwerks cartoon library was purchased by Commonwealth.

In the 1950s, Commonwealth released the Van Beuren and Iwerks material for television syndication. They, like Gutlohn Films, Inc., cut the opening titles so that only the last 5 seconds or so plays. Their standard title card was a blue background with yellow or orange lettering.

In 1969, the Commonwealth library was sold to the TelePrompTer Corporation. In 1975, Blackhawk Films purchased the Teleprompter library, and today the Commonwealth library is in the hands of Film Preservation Associates.

Guaranteed Pictures Company, Inc. ceased operations all together in 1974.
