= Gulliver's Travels (1939 film) =

1939 animated film

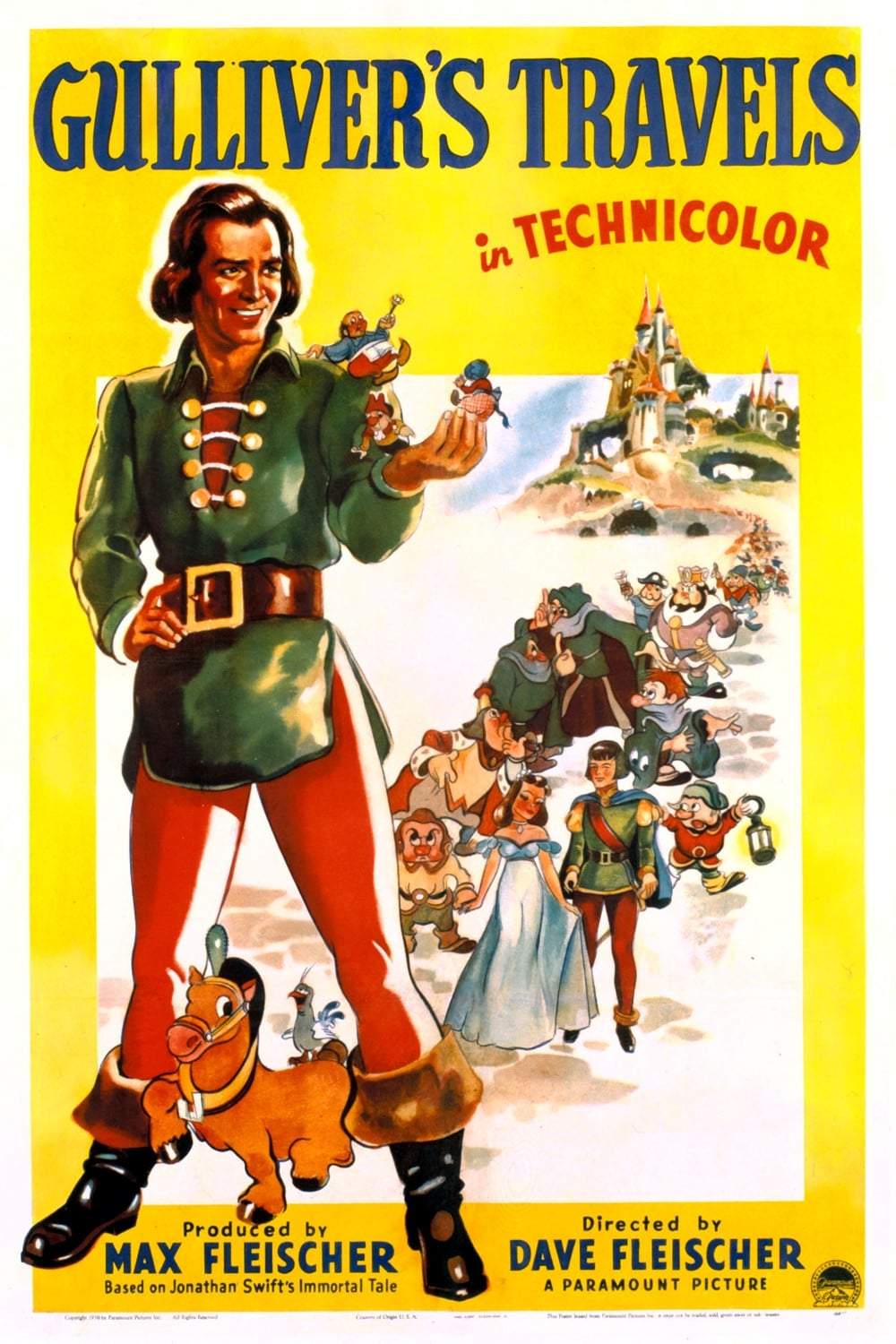
- Theatrical release poster
- Directed by: Dave Fleischer; Animation directors Seymour Kneitel; Willard Bowsky; Tom Palmer; Grim Natwick; William Henning; Roland Crandall; Thomas Johnson; Robert Leffingwell; Frank Kelling; Winfield Hoskins; Orestes Calpini
- Screenplay by: Dan Gordon; Cal Howard; Tedd Pierce; I. Sparber; Edmond Seward
- Story by: Edmond Seward
- Based on: Gulliver's Travels by: Jonathan Swift
- Produced by: Max Fleischer
- Starring: Jessica Dragonette; Lanny Ross
- Cinematography: Charles Schettler
- Music by: Victor Young; Leo Robin (songs); Ralph Rainger (songs); Al Neiburg (songs); Winston Sharples (songs); Sammy Timberg (songs)
- Production company: Fleischer Studios
- Distributed by: Paramount Pictures
- Release dates: December 20, 1939 (New York City); December 22, 1939 (general release)
- Running time: 76 minutes
- Country: United States
- Language: English
- Budget: $700,000
- Box office: $3.27 million

Gulliver's Travels is a 1939 American animated musical fantasy film produced by Fleischer Studios and released by Paramount Pictures. Loosely based on the first part of Jonathan Swift's 1726 novel, it was the first of two feature-length animated films by Fleischer Studios and the second animated film produced by an American studio, commissioned by Paramount after the success of Walt Disney Productions' Snow White and the Seven Dwarfs (1937). The film was produced by Max Fleischer and directed by Dave Fleischer, with animation sequences directed by Seymour Kneitel, Willard Bowsky, Tom Palmer, Grim Natwick, William Henning, Roland Crandall, Thomas Johnson, Robert Leffingwell, Frank Kelling, Winfield Hoskins, and Orestes Calpini.

Gulliver's Travels premiered in New York City on December 20, 1939, and went into general release in the United States on December 22. It received nominations for Best Music, Original Score and Best Music, Original Song ("Faithful Forever") at the 12th Academy Awards, losing both to Metro-Goldwyn-Mayer's The Wizard of Oz. Despite positive reviews from critics and box office success, Fleischer Studios did not recoup the budget spent on the film's production, portending the development of their next feature film, Mr. Bug Goes to Town, and the company's eventual demise in 1942.

== Plot ==
Full film: Gulliver's Travels (1939)

On November 5, 1699, Lemuel Gulliver washes onto the beach of Lilliput after his ship is wrecked in a storm. Town crier Gabby stumbles across an unconscious Gulliver during his rounds ("All's Well") and rushes back to Lilliput to warn everyone about the "giant on the beach". Meanwhile, King Little of Lilliput and King Bombo of Blefuscu are signing a wedding contract between their children, Princess Glory of Lilliput and Prince David of Blefuscu, respectively. An argument erupts over which national anthem is to be played at the wedding; the anthem of Lilliput ("Faithful") or the anthem of Blefuscu ("Forever"). In fury, King Bombo cancels the wedding and declares war against Liliput. He seems to consider changing his mind, but then Gabby rushes in, and a guard pursuing Gabby accidentally grabs Bombo, who takes it as an insult and storms off.

Gabby tells King Little of the "giant", and leads a mob to the beach to capture him. There, the Lilliputians tie Gulliver to a wagon and convey him to the town. The next morning, Gulliver awakens and breaks himself free, terrifying the Lilliputians. The Blefuscuian fleet arrives at Lilliput and starts firing upon the castle. Seeing Gulliver laughing at him, Bombo panics and orders a hasty retreat. Realizing that they can use Gulliver as a weapon, the Lilliputians start to treat him with hospitality and even make him a new set of clothes ("It's a Hap-Hap-Happy Day").

Back in Blefuscu, King Bombo is embarrassed by the defeat, and orders his three spies in Lilliput - Sneak, Snoop and Snitch - to "get rid of that giant or else." Meanwhile, in celebration of the defeat, the Lilliputians treat Gulliver to dinner and a show ("Bluebirds in the Moonlight"). When the Lilliputians fall asleep after the show, Gulliver walks to the shore, unaware that the spies have taken his pistol, and reminisces about sailing ("I Hear A Dream (Come Home)"). The next day, after some horseplay with Gabby, Gulliver notices a building on fire and uses a nearby stream to put it out, not realizing he just saved the spies who wish to kill him. Later that night, Prince David sneaks back into Lilliput to visit Princess Glory. Gabby overhears the Prince singing a reprise of "Forever" and, mistaking him for a spy, orders the guards to attack the prince. Noticing this, Gulliver picks up David and Glory in his hands, and they tell him of the war's cause. Gulliver suggests that they combine "Faithful" and "Forever" into one song.

In Blefuscu, Bombo receives a message from his spies assuring him that Gulliver will be a "dead duck" whenever he gives the word, and he announces by carrier pigeon that he will attack at dawn. Gabby intercepts this message and warns the Lilliputians. Because of this, the spies aren't aware of the order until they capture Gabby just as the Lilliputians are marching to the beach ("We're All Together Now"). They hastily prepare Gulliver's pistol. As the Blefuscuian fleet approaches Lilliput, Gulliver demands they lay down their arms and settle matters peaceably. When they continue shooting arrows, he ties the Blefuscuian ships together using their anchors and draws them to shore, saving any men who fall overboard in the process to show he means no ill will. The spies aim and fire at Gulliver from a cliff, but Prince David diverts the shot, falling to his apparent death in the process. Using David's still body to illustrate his point, Gulliver scolds both Lilliput and Blefuscu for their senseless fighting. While they solemnize a truce, Gulliver reveals that David is unharmed, whereupon David and Glory sing their combined song for everyone to hear ("Faithful Forever"). Both sides thereafter build a new ship for Gulliver, and he sails off into the sunset ("Come Home Reprise").

== Voice cast ==
- Sam Parker as Gulliver
  - Max Smith as Gulliver (singing voice)
- Pinto Colvig as Gabby, Snitch, Gulliver (water gurgling sounds)
- Jack Mercer as Prince David, King Little, Twinkletoes, Snoop, Horses, Royal Chef
  - Lanny Ross as the singing voice of Prince David
- Tedd Pierce as King Bombo, Sneak, Villagers
- Lovey Warren as Princess Glory
  - Jessica Dragonette as the singing voice of Princess Glory
- Joe Oriolo as Italian Barber
- Margie Hines as Lilliputian Woman, Princess Glory (some crying and sobs)
- Carl Meyer as Lilliputians

== Music ==
No.	Title	Length
1.	"All's Well"
2.	"Faithful/Forever"
3.	"It's a Hap-Hap-Happy Day"
4.	"Bluebirds in the Moonlight (Silly Idea)"
5.	"I Hear a Dream (Come Home Again)"
6.	"We're All Together Now"

All of the songs were written by Leo Robin and composed by Ralph Rainger with the exception of "It's a Hap-Hap-Happy Day", which was written by Sammy Timberg, Al Neiburg and Winston Sharples.

The score for Gulliver's Travels was done by Victor Young, who received his third nomination for the Academy Award for Best Original Score. "Faithful/Forever" was also nominated for the Academy Award for Best Original Song, but both lost to The Wizard of Oz (with the film winning the latter category for the song "Over the Rainbow"). "It's a Hap-Hap-Happy Day" and "All's Well" went on to become standard themes used in Fleischer and Famous Studios cartoon scores, while "I Hear a Dream" was quite popular as well.

Selections from the music score was released by Marco Polo Records in 1997 as part of "The Classic Film Music of Victor Young" album (alongside selected cues for the 1952 Oscar-winning film The Greatest Show on Earth, The Uninvited and Bright Leaf).

=== Covers ===
- "Faithful Forever": Glenn Miller & His Orchestra, Judy Garland
- "Faithful Forever": Michael Poss
- "It's a Hap-Hap-Happy Day": Bob Zurke & His Delta Rhythm Band, Arthur Askey, Guy Lombardo and His Royal Canadians, Judy Garland
- "Bluebirds in the Moonlight": Glenn Miller

== Production ==
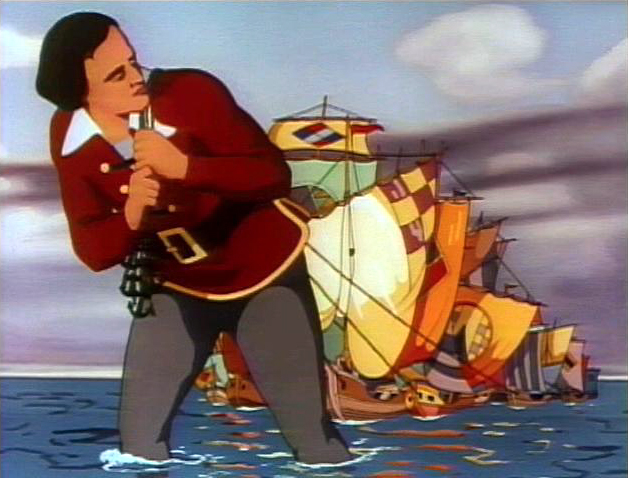
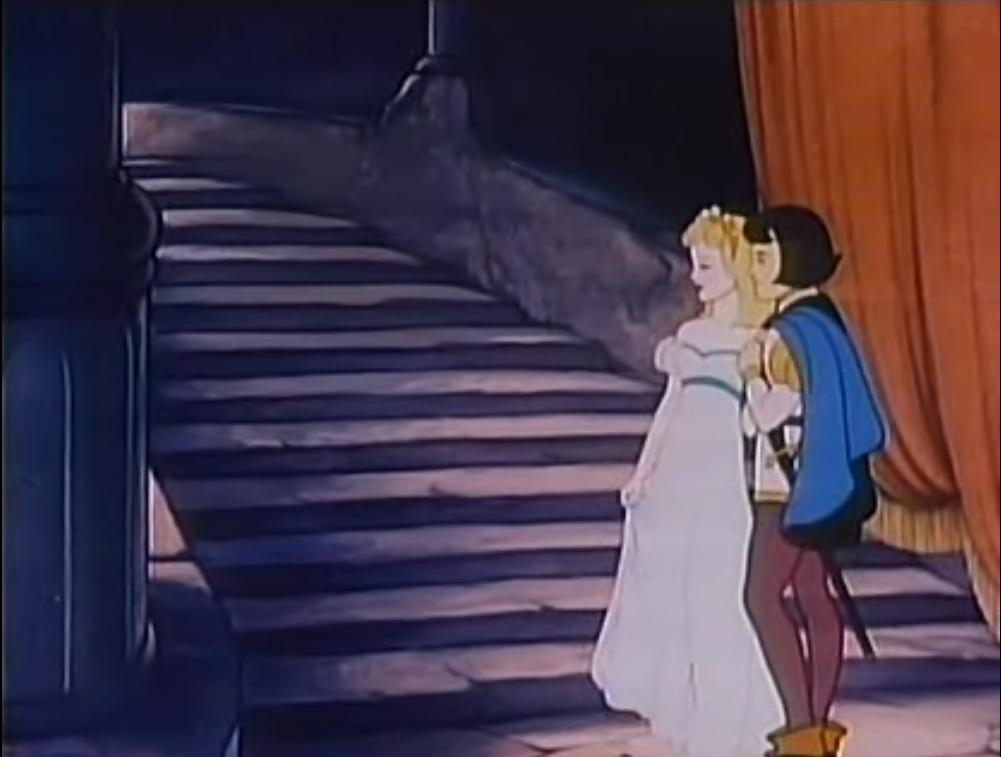
Gulliver's Travels, 1939

Max Fleischer had envisioned a feature as early as 1934, but Paramount vetoed the idea based largely on their interests in maintaining financial solvency following their series of bankruptcy reorganizations. However, after the success of Walt Disney Productions' Snow White and the Seven Dwarfs, Paramount wanted to duplicate the Disney success and ordered a feature for a 1939 Christmas release, which would be Paramount's first animated feature. When the story was first written in New York, Popeye the Sailor had originally been cast as Gulliver. This was scrapped, and the story was restructured once the West Coast team of Cal Howard, Tedd Pierce, and Edmond Seward came aboard (Popeye would later be cast as a Gulliver-like character in an abridged version of the story called "Popeye's Travels", made for the 1960s Popeye the Sailor television show).

One of the major challenges for Fleischer Studios was the 18-month delivery envelope, coming at a time when the studio was relocating to Miami, Florida. While Snow White was in production for 18 months, it had been in development for just as long, allowing for a total of three years to reach the screen. To meet this deadline, the Fleischer staff was greatly expanded to some 800 employees. Animation training classes were set up with Miami art schools as a conduit for additional workers. Experienced lead animators were lured from Hollywood studios, including Nelson Demorest, Joe D'Igalo, and former Fleischer Animators Grim Natwick, Al Eugster, and Shamus Culhane, who returned after working for the Walt Disney Studios.

Several West Coast techniques were introduced in order to provide better animation and greater personality in the characters. Some animators adapted while others did not. Pencil tests were unheard of in New York but were soon embraced as a tool for improving production methods. While the majority of the characters were animated through conventional animation techniques, rotoscoping was used to animate Gulliver, Glory, and David. Sam Parker, the voice of Gulliver, also modeled for the live-action reference.

The rushed schedule seemed to take precedence over quality, and overtime was the order of the day. Even so, deadlines were frequently compromised, causing strain with the Technicolor lab (who were unfamiliar with the studio's remote Miami location) and Paramount to consider cancelling the film altogether. Ultimately, Fleischer Studios delivered Gulliver's Travels in time for the Christmas release window; while it lacked the built-in brand recognition of the Popeye shorts and the Color Specials trilogy that came before it, the film was still well-anticipated by the public, even with the inevitable comparisons to Snow White.

Despite running over budget, Paramount made a domestic profit of at least $1 million from Gulliver's Travels. The film's financial success in its first week led Paramount president Barney Balaban to order another feature for a 1941 Christmas release.

=== Vocal talent ===
The voice cast was balanced between veteran performers and popular talent. Town crier Gabby was voiced by Pinto Colvig, a former Disney voice actor known for portraying Goofy, the Practical Pig in The Three Little Pigs, and both Grumpy and Sleepy in Snow White and the Seven Dwarfs, while also providing vocal effects for Pluto. Jack Mercer, best known as the voice of Popeye the Sailor, voiced King Little of Lilliput and Bombo's spies, Sneak, Snoop, and Snitch. Jessica Dragonette and Lanny Ross were both popular singers of the day, and were hired to sing for Princess Glory and Prince David, respectively. Sam Parker was a radio announcer in the 1930s who won the role of Gulliver in a radio contest. When the Fleischers met Parker, they felt that his appearance was suitable for him to also perform in the live action footage that would be rotoscoped to create Gulliver's movement. Tedd Pierce was a story man hired away from Leon Schlesinger Productions to join Fleischer in their trip to Miami. Pierce, who would occasionally do voices for some of the characters in regular cartoons, played King Bombo.

== Release ==
Gulliver's Travels opened in New York on December 20, 1939, before going into general release two days later. Like Snow White before it, the film was a box office success, earning $3.27 million in the United States during its original run, even as it was limited to fifty theaters during the 1939 Christmas season. This box-office success prompted a second feature to be ordered for a Christmas 1941 release, Mr. Bug Goes to Town. Following its domestic run, Gulliver went into foreign release in February 1940, despite the interruption in some European markets by the onset of World War II.

Despite its domestic and international profits, Paramount held Fleischer Studios to a $350,000 penalty for going over budget, beginning the financial difficulties the animation studio encountered as it entered the 1940s.

=== Television broadcasts ===
When the Fleischer film library was sold to television in 1955, Gulliver's Travels was not included, since Paramount had already sold it to Leo McCarey in the 1940s. However, National Telefilm Associates purchased the movie from McCarey in October of 1956. The film then became a local television station holiday film shown during the Thanksgiving and Christmas season. It was also re-released theatrically in Technicolor prints for Saturday matinee children's programs well into the mid-1960s.

The film premiered on the Turner Classic Movies channel on October 21, 2012, transferred from an original 35mm Technicolor release print owned by the Museum of Modern Art Department of Film, in a television special hosted by Robert Osborne and Jerry Beck dedicated to rare animated films. Other films screened alongs with Gulliver included Mr. Bug Goes to Town, Lotte Reiniger's The Adventures of Prince Achmed, UPA cartoons, and the silent cartoons of 1907 to 1932 of the New York Studios.

=== Home media ===
Gulliver's Travels is currently in the public domain, as its copyright failed to be renewed in 1967. The film has since been released by various distributors on multiple home video formats. E1 Entertainment released the film on Blu-ray Disc on March 10, 2009, but received criticism for presenting the film in a stretched and cropped 1.75:1 format, as well as applying heavy noise reduction. In March 2014, Thunderbean Animation released a superior restored version of the film along with several Fleischer shorts in a Blu-ray/DVD combo pack titled Fleischer Classics Featuring Gulliver's Travels.

== Reception ==
Upon release, the film received positive reviews from critics. On the review aggregator website Rotten Tomatoes, the film holds an approval rating of 69%, based on 13 reviews.

=== Awards ===
The film was nominated for two Academy Awards:

- Victor Young for Best Music, Original Score
- Ralph Rainger (music) and Leo Robin (lyrics) for Best Music, Original Song ("Faithful Forever")

The film lost both awards to Metro-Goldwyn-Mayer's The Wizard of Oz.

== Spin-off cartoons ==
The film was spun off into two short-lived Fleischer cartoon short series: the Gabby series and the Animated Antics cartoons starring the three spies (Sneak, Snoop, and Snitch) and the carrier pigeon (Twinkletoes).

== See also ==
- List of animated feature films
- 1939 in film
- List of animated films in the public domain in the United States

== Works cited ==
- Barrier, Michael (1999). Hollywood Cartoons: American Animation in Its Golden Age. Oxford: Oxford University Press. ISBN 0-19-516729-5.
- Maltin, Leonard (1980, updated 1987). Of Mice and Magic: A History of American Animated Cartoons. New York: Penguin Books. ISBN 0-452-25993-2.
- Pointer, Ray (2016). "The Art and Inventions of Max Fleischer: American Animation Pioneer". McFarland & Co. Publishers. ISBN 9781-4766-6367-8.
