= Charles O'Flynn =

American songwriter

Charles O'Flynn (1897–1964) was an American songwriter. He was active during the Tin Pan Alley era - specifically from 1921 to 1947. One of O'Flynn's most famous lyrics was for the popular song "Smile, Darn Ya, Smile", which later appeared in Robert Zemeckis's Who Framed Roger Rabbit.

== Partial list of published songs ==
- 1921: "Dr. Jazz's Raz-Ma-Taz" - c: Joe Rose
- 1925: "Play Me Slow" - c: Hagen
- 1926: "When You Waltz With The One You Love" - m: Al Sherman and w: Charles O'Flynn
- 1929: "Where The Bab Bab Babbling Brook (Goes Bub Bub Bubbling By)" - w: Harry Pease and Charles O'Flynn; m: Ed G. Nelson
- 1930: "Roses are Forget-Me-Nots" - c/l O'Flynn, Will Osborne and Al Hoffman
- 1930: "Swinging in a Hammock" - lyric O'Flynn and Tot Seymour; c. Pete Wendling
- 1930: "Jungle Drums" - c. Ernesto Lecuona; w: O'Flynn and Carmen Lombardo. This song was used in Dancing Co-Ed
- 1930: "Good Evening" - Tot Seymour, O'Flynn, and Al Hoffman
- 1930: "In My Heart, It's You" - Charles O'Flynn with Max Rich and Al Hoffman
- 1930: "I'm Tickled Pink With a Blue-Eyed Baby" - c. Pete Wendling
- 1930: "On a Blue and Moonless Night" - c/l: O'Flynn, Will Osborne and Al Hoffman
- 1931: "Smile, Darn Ya, Smile" - l: O'Flynn and Jack Meskill; c: Max Rich
- 1931: "Yes or No" (c. Max Rich. From Road to Singapore
- 1932: "I'm Sure of Everything But You" - c: Pete Wendling and George W. Meyer
- 1932: "Strangers" - c: J. Fred Coots
- 1933: "Three of Us" - c: Lee David, Pete Wending
- 1934: "Sweetie Don't Grow Sour On Me - c: Thomas "Fats" Waller
- 1934: "Neighbors" - l: O'Flynn and James Cavanaugh; c. Frank Weldon
- 1935: "Gypsy Violin" - W&M: Charles O'Flynn, Jack Betzner
- 1939: "After All I've Been to You" - c: David and Redmond
- 1947: "Something For Nothing" - m: Willard Robison; w: Charles O'Flynn

== Other songs ==
- "Hawaiian Sandman" - w: Charles O'Flynn- m: F. Henri Klickmann
