= The Van Beuren Corporation =

Defunct American animation studio

- Formerly: Fables Pictures, Inc (1920-1931)
- Industry: Animation studio
- Founded: 1920; 106 years ago
- Founders: Amedee J. Van Beuren; Paul Terry
- Defunct: 1936; 90 years ago
- Fate: Closed
- Successor: Terrytoons
- Headquarters: New York City, New York, United States

The Van Beuren Corporation, headed by producer Amedee J. Van Beuren, was a New York City-based film studio that produced theatrical cartoons and live-action short-subjects from the 1920s to 1936.

== History ==
In 1920, the Keith-Albee organization formed Fables Pictures for the production of the Aesop's Film Fables cartoon series with Paul Terry, who himself owned 10 percent of the studio. Amedee J. Van Beuren bought into Terry's studio in 1928. Terry ran the animation studio while Van Beuren focused on other parts of the business. Van Beuren wanted to make cartoons in the then-new sound format but Terry, already accustomed to silent-film economics, was reluctant. Van Beuren released Terry's first sound cartoon Dinner Time (1928) (a month before Disney's Steamboat Willie) through Pathé Exchange, which later became part of RKO Radio Pictures. Van Beuren broke away from Terry and formed his own company, Van Beuren Studios, releasing through Pathé. Terry started his own Terrytoons studio, while Fables alumnus (and eventual Terrytoons storyman) John Foster took over the animation department.

The early sound Van Beuren cartoons are almost identical to the late silent cartoons: highly visual, with little dialogue and occasional sound effects. Bandleader Gene Rodemich and his assistant and successor Winston Sharples supervised the music. The company's main cartoon characters were "Tom and Jerry", a tall-and-short pair of stylized humans, usually vagrants who attempted various occupations. They share no relation to MGM's more successful cat-and-mouse Tom and Jerry, and the older series was renamed "Dick and Larry" (by home-movie distributor Official Films) and more recently "Van Beuren's Tom and Jerry". Van Beuren was keenly aware that successful cartoons often featured animated "stars", and urged his staff to come up with new ideas for characters. Cubby, a mischievous little bear, resulted.

In 1932, Van Beuren planned to release a series of wild-animal shorts featuring celebrity explorer Frank Buck. RKO executives were so impressed by these Van Beuren shorts that they decided to combine them into a feature film, Bring 'Em Back Alive. This was a very successful business move, but it left both Van Beuren and RKO with a void in their short-subject schedule. Van Beuren, forced to act quickly, found an existing series of two-reel comedies: Charlie Chaplin's 12 productions for the Mutual film company, produced in 1916-17. Van Beuren paid $10,000 each for the shorts, and assigned his animation department to create new music and sound effects for the silent films. Gene Rodemich and Winston Sharples assembled new orchestral scores. RKO released the Van Beuren Chaplins from August 1932 to July 1934. Chaplin did not own these films; author Michael J. Hayde discloses that Chaplin had declined several opportunities to purchase them.

The Van Beuren Corporation acquired and produced live-action features such as Adventure Girl (1934) and two more Frank Buck safaris, Wild Cargo (1934) and Frank Buck's Fang and Claw (1935). Other Van Beuren live-action productions included a "Van Beuren Vagabond" travelogue series, a series of novelty shorts narrated by the radio comedy team Easy Aces (Goodman Ace and Jane Ace), and musical comedy shorts featuring Bert Lahr or Shemp Howard, and other musical or comedy acts.

== Management change and series decline ==
By mid‑1933, RKO had grown dissatisfied with the creative direction of the Van Beuren cartoons, in particular the Tom and Jerry shorts, viewing them as too surreal and lacking in broad commercial appeal. According to animator Mannie Davis, RKO installed Hiram S. Brown, Jr. (nicknamed "Bunny" and the son of RKO executive Hiram Brown) as business manager in 1933. Brown clashed with director John Foster, and Foster's name disappeared from credits after 1933. He was replaced by music director Gene Rodemich.

Film Daily announced on September 1, 1933 that the Tom and Jerry series had been discontinued, to be replaced by Otto Soglow's popular comic-strip character "The Little King". In fact, Soglow's comic strips had already been adapted into animation, and the first cartoon, entitled “A Dizzy Day,” was released in theaters on May 5, 1933. Although the film was praised by critics for its modernist musical accompaniment, Hiram Brown felt that the cartoon was too eccentric and requested changes for future productions. Rodemich therefore removed the modernist musical accompaniment and attempted to give the character of Sentinel Louey a gentler personality, resulting in the release of “AM to PM” on July 28, 1933. However, Brown was still not satisfied with the result and increased pressure on Rodemich to make his cartoons less strange, which, in his opinion, would make them easier to market.

Gene Rodemich finally completed “The Fatal Note” on September 29, 1933. The film was a mediocre operetta in the vein of the Silly Symphonies series produced by Disney Studios at the same time. This time, the protest came from Otto Soglow himself, who felt that the cartoon completely disregarded the spirit of his comic strips. Exasperated by these complaints and the increasingly restrictive pressure from Hiram Brown, Rodemich decided to resign from his position as studio director and was replaced by George Stallings.

On September 21, 1933, supervisor Brown slashed the payroll by discharging 10 animators and assistants (from a staff of 96, according to head animator Harry Bailey). Film Daily expressed surprise: "Harry D. Bailey, one of the head animators who has been with the company 12 years, and George Rufle, another chief animator, were among the departures." Supervisor Brown went on to head the serial unit at Republic Pictures.

Van Beuren remained dissatisfied, and after licensing The Little King he signed the radio comedy act Amos 'n' Andy to provide their voices for animated cartoons. Neither series was successful.

== Color cartoons ==
With the availability of "perfected" Technicolor (now with three basic colors instead of two), Van Beuren saw an opportunity to challenge Walt Disney, who led the field of animation. Van Beuren then hired director Burt Gillett and animator Tom Palmer away from Disney, to create a new series of color cartoons. These "Rainbow Parade" cartoons featured established characters: Felix the Cat, Parrotville Parrots, Molly Moo-Cow, and the Toonerville Folks. These full-color Van Beuren efforts were well received, and Van Beuren had finally succeeded in sponsoring a popular cartoon series.

Van Beuren's new prosperity was short-lived. His distributor, RKO, agreed to release new Technicolor cartoons produced by Walt Disney. RKO, no longer needing Van Beuren's cartoons, abandoned the Rainbow Parade shorts.

Amedee J. Van Beuren fell ill during this time. In July 1938, he had a stroke. During his convalescence, Van Beuren noted with dismay that many animation studios were unionizing. His own staff had gone on strike in 1935 over Van Beuren's reluctance to recognize a union. Instead of inviting more labor problems, and having to shop for a new distributor after being cast adrift by RKO, Van Beuren decided to shut down his studio completely.

He never fully recovered from the stroke, and he suffered a fatal heart attack on November 12, 1938.

The Van Beuren film library was acquired by various television, reissue, and home-movie distributors in the 1940s and 1950s, including Unity Pictures, Walter Gutlohn/Library Films, Guaranteed Pictures and its 16mm division Commonwealth Pictures, and Official Films. The library eventually lapsed into the public domain.

== Productions ==
Animation:

- Aesop's Fables (1921–1934)
  - Cubby Bear
  - Sentinel Louey
  - Lucky Leo and Lily Lion (unfinished series, never released in cinemas)
- Tom and Jerry (1931–1933)
- The Little King (1933–1934)
- Amos 'n' Andy (1934)
- Burt Gillett's Toddle Tales (1934)
- Rainbow Parade (1934–1936) (color series)
  - Felix the Cat
  - Molly Moo-Cow

Live-action:

- Bring 'Em Back Alive (1932)
- Adventure Girl (1934)
- Wild Cargo (1934)
- Fang and Claw (1935)

Live-action shorts:

- The Grantland Rice Sportland (1928–1932)
- Curiosities (1928–1929)
- Smitty and His Pals (1928–1929)
- Topics of the Day (1928–1930) (inherited from Timely Films)
- The Swan (1929) (Walter Futter Overtures series)
- Song Sketches (1930)
- Vagabond Adventures (1930–1935)
- Floyd Gibbons Supreme Thrills (1931)
- Liberty Short Short Stories (1931–1932)
- Charlie Chaplin (1932–1934) (reissued shorts with sound)
- Musical Comedies (1933–1934)
- Dumb-Bell Letters (1934–1936), based on Juliet Lowell's collection of actual dimwitted correspondence to businesses
- Easy Aces (1935–1936)
- Struggle to Live (1935–1937)
- World on Parade (1935–1937)
- Sports with Bill Corum (1935–1937)
