= Toonerville Folks =

American comic strip by Fontaine Fox

- Fontaine Fox's Toonerville Folks (February 15, 1931).
- Author: Fontaine Fox
- Current status/schedule: Concluded daily & Sunday gag panel
- Launch date: 1908, syndicated beginning in 1913
- End date: Feb 12, 1955
- Alternate name: The Toonerville Trolley That Meets All the Trains
- Syndicate(s): Wheeler Syndicate (1913–1916); Bell Syndicate (1916–c. 1930); McNaught Syndicate (c. 1930–1955)
- Publisher(s): All-American Publications; Eastern Color Printing
- Genre: Humor

Toonerville Folks (a.k.a. The Toonerville Trolley That Meets All the Trains) is an American newspaper comic strip feature by Fontaine Fox, which ran from 1908 to 1955. It began in 1908 in the Chicago Post, and by 1913, it was syndicated nationally by the Wheeler Syndicate. From the 1930s on, it was distributed by the McNaught Syndicate.

== Characters and story ==
The single-panel gag cartoon (with longer-form comics on Sunday) is a daily look at Toonerville, situated in what are now called the suburbs. Central to the strip is the rickety little trolley called the "Toonerville Trolley that meets all the trains", driven in a frenzy by the grizzly old Skipper to meet each commuter train as it arrives in town. The many richly-formed characters include Suitcase Simpson, Mickey McGuire, the Powerful Katrinka, the Terrible Tempered Mr. Bang, Aunt Eppie Hogg, Little Woo-Woo Wortle, The Little Scorpions, and "Stinky" Davis.

== Origin ==
Fox described the inspiration for the cartoon series in an article he wrote for The Saturday Evening Post titled "A Queer Way to Make a Living" (February 11, 1928, page six):

After years of gestation, the idea for the Toonerville Trolley was born one day up in Westchester County when my wife and I had left New York City to visit Charlie Voight, the cartoonist, in the Pelhams. At the station, we saw a rattletrap of a streetcar, which had as its crew and skipper a wistful old codger with an Airedale beard. He showed as much concern in the performance of his job as you might expect from Captain Hartley when docking the Leviathan.

== Films ==
Between 1920 and 1922, 17 Toonerville silent film comedy adaptations were scripted by Fox for Philadelphia's Betzwood Film Company. These starred Dan Mason as the Skipper with Wilna Hervey as Katrinka. Only seven of those 17 shorts survive today. Four are preserved in the Betzwood Film Archive at Montgomery County Community College, Blue Bell, Pennsylvania.

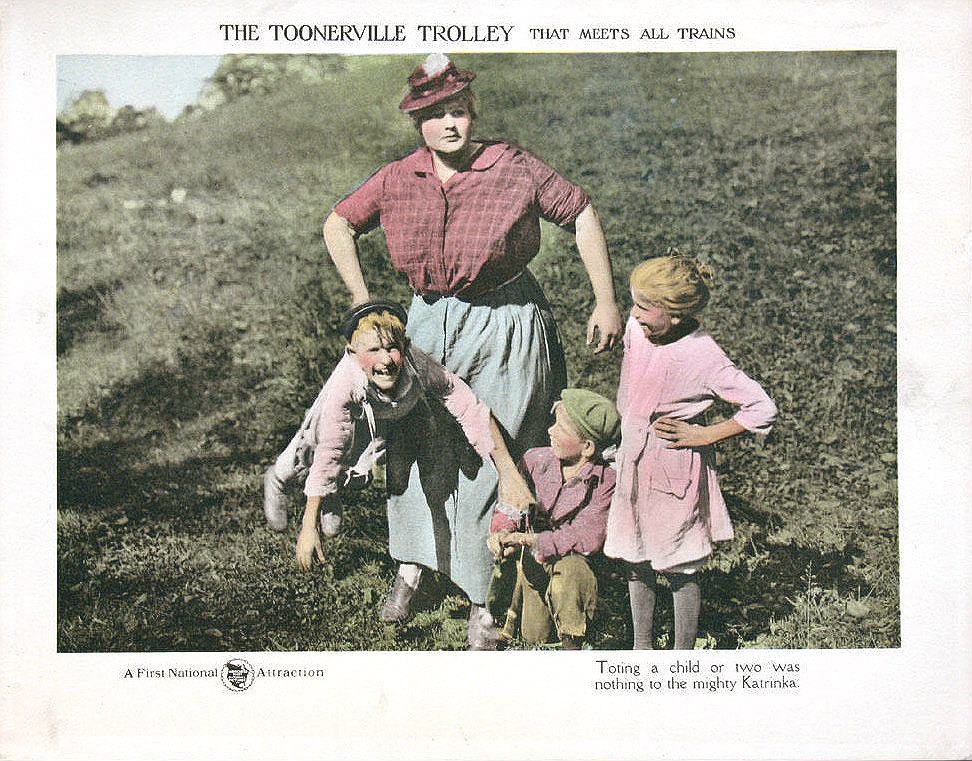
Toonerville Trolley with Wilna Hervey, 1920.

1920

- The Toonerville Trolley

1921

- The Skipper's Treasure Scheme
- Skipper's Flirtation
- Toonerville Tangle
- The Skipper Strikes It Rich
- Toonerville Tactics
- The Skipper's Narrow Escape
- The Skipper Has His Fling
- The Skipper's Scheme
- Toonerville's 'Boozem' Friends
- Toonerville Follies
- Toonerville's Fire Brigade
- The Skipper's Treasure Garden

1922

- The Skipper's Sermon
- Toonerville Topics
- Toonerville Blues
- Toonerville Trials
- The Skipper's Policy

Mickey Rooney starred as Mickey McGuire in more than 55 comedy shorts filmed between 1927 and 1936. Rooney (né Joe Yule, Jr.) adopted the professional name Mickey McGuire for a time before finally settling on the last name Rooney.

Three Toonerville cartoons were produced by Van Beuren Studios in 1936 as part of the Rainbow Parade series. Distributed by RKO Radio Pictures Katrinka was animated by Joseph Barbera.

Release date	Title
January 17, 1936	Toonerville Trolley
July 3, 1936	Trolley Ahoy
October 2, 1936	Toonerville Picnic

A Toonerville Trolley cartoon, "Lost and Found", was included in Simple Gifts, a Christmas collection of six animated shorts shown on PBS TV in 1977.

Over the years, various Toonerville characters acted as spokesmen for popular products of the day. Skipper, Flem Proddy and Katrinka appeared throughout the decades in advertisements for Drano, Kellogg's cereals and Chef Boyardee foods.

== Reprints ==
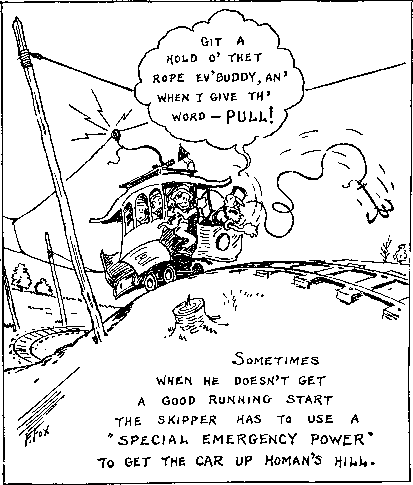
Fontaine Fox's Toonerville Folks (1917).

Between 1934 and 1940, comic book reprints of the panel appeared in many issues of All-American Comics, Famous Funnies, and Popular Comics. In 1995, the strip was one of 20 included in the Comic Strip Classics series of commemorative United States postage stamps.

In 1972, Herb Galewitz and Don Winslow compiled Fontaine Fox's Toonerville Trolley, a 184-page book of daily panels, for Weathervane Books, an imprint of Charles Scribner's Sons.

== Namesakes ==
Communities in Colorado, Kentucky, Missouri, and Pennsylvania were named after the comic strip.
