= Winston Sharples =

American composer (1909–1978)

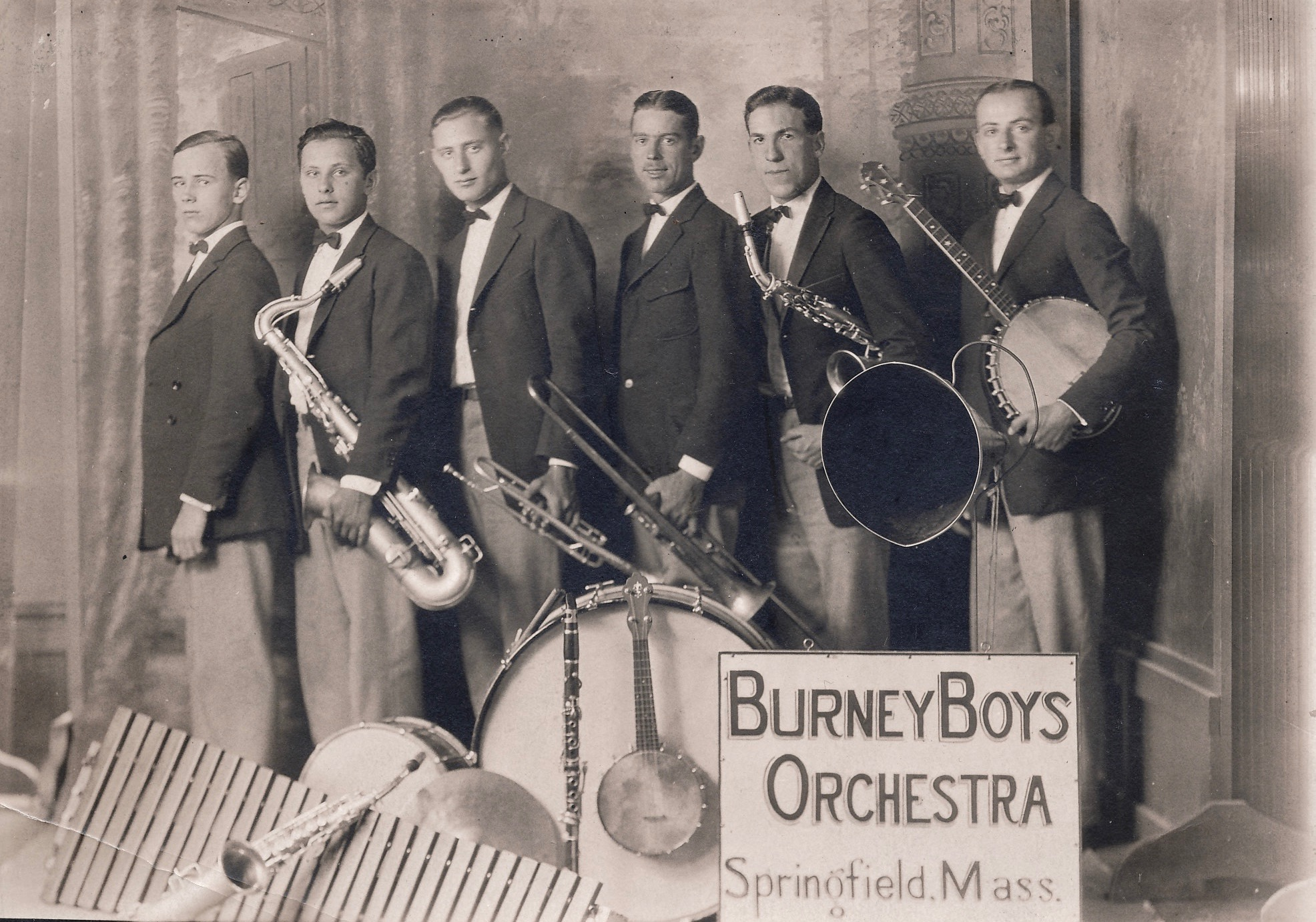
- Sharples (far left) with the Burney Boys Orchestra, c. 1920s
- Born: March 1, 1909; Fall River, Massachusetts
- Died: April 3, 1978 (aged 69); Hilton Head, South Carolina
- Occupation: Musician
- Known for: Cartoon and film music
- Spouses: Daisy Josephine Shackley (m. 1931; died 1937) Carmela Parrino (m. 1938)
- Children: 3

Winston Singleton Sharples (March 1, 1909 – April 3, 1978) was an American composer known for his work with animated short subjects, especially those created by the animation department at Paramount Pictures. In his 35-year career, Sharples scored more than 700 cartoons for Paramount and Famous Studios, and composed music for two Frank Buck films, Wild Cargo (1934) and Fang and Claw (1935).

== Early years ==
Sharples was born in Fall River, Massachusetts to William, a machinist, and Mary Sharples. He began singing in vaudeville shows at the Loew's Poli Theatre in Springfield, Massachusetts, at the age of eight. He taught himself to play the piano, forming a band that played at Ivy League college dances throughout New England. He graduated from Classical High School in Springfield in 1925.

== Performer ==
After high school, Sharples formed the Burney Boys Orchestra, playing piano and orchestrating music for the group. The band played around the country. Sharples appeared on radio for two years, from 1930 to 1932, playing the piano on a 15-minute morning program at various stations in Connecticut. He relocated to New York City in 1932, where he played piano and occasionally bass with Vincent Lopez's orchestra.

== Film music composer ==
Sharples assisted Gene Rodemich in scoring cartoons for the Van Beuren Studios in 1932 after Walter Winchell praised his work with Lopez in a column, which was read by studio owner Amadee Van Beuren. Sharples stayed at Van Beuren until 1936, during which time he composed music for two Frank Buck films, Wild Cargo (1934) and Fang and Claw (1935).

With Van Beuren winding down production, Sharples joined the Max Fleischer studio in New York as musical director. In 1938, Sharples composed "It's A Hap-Hap-Happy Day" for Fleischer's full-length animated musical production of Gulliver's Travels. Paramount Pictures released the film to cinemas in the United States on December 22, 1939. Several of the songs from that production were used throughout subsequent years in Paramount shorts, with the most notable being "It's A Hap-Hap-Happy Day". The song was a hit in the UK in 1940 during the Battle of Britain, having been played heavily on the BBC radio. Sharples worked at Fleischer Studios in Miami, Florida, where he became the leader of a band that played in nightclubs in Miami Beach. In 1942, Paramount moved Fleischer Studios to New York City and renamed it Famous Studios.

In 1945, Sharples replaced Sammy Timberg as the Eastern musical director for Paramount Studios, writing music for their cartoons, newsreels, and short subjects. The studio's productions included three series started by the Fleischers—Popeye the Sailor, Superman, and Screen Songs—as well as Little Audrey, Little Lulu, Casper the Friendly Ghost, Honey Halfwitch, Herman and Katnip, Baby Huey, and the anthology Noveltoons series.

He joined ASCAP in 1948. In 1958, Sharples teamed with Joe Oriolo for musical production on the Felix the Cat television series. That series made extensive use of stock music composed for the Paramount shorts as well as Sharples' distinctive theme song.

== Later works ==
In the late 1950s, Sharples and animation producer Hal Seeger formed a partnership called Scroll Productions that repackaged Sharples' scores from the Paramount cartoons into a stock music library, much like the Capitol Records Hi-Q library. Most of the cues were from late 50s productions, but some dated as far back as the 1952 Popeye cartoon Big Bad Sindbad. Besides the aforementioned Felix the Cat, productions using this stock music included the King Features Syndicate TV cartoons (Popeye, Barney Google, and Beetle Bailey), King Leonardo, and Tennessee Tuxedo. Later, Sharples cues were recycled into episodes of Seeger's Batfink. Sharples also composed the theme song for Seeger's Milton the Monster television series in 1965, in addition to using the stock music package for part of the underscore.

Sharples continued at the Paramount cartoon studio, successfully adapting his style to smaller groups and even incorporating jazz and rock and roll styles for the edgier works of Ralph Bakshi, until it closed in 1967.

Among other better-known compositions were "Puppets; When You Left Me" and "What Has She Got That I Haven't Got".

== Personal life ==
In 1931, Sharples married Daisy Shackley, a singing hostess at the Hotel Kimball studio of WBZ Radio in Springfield. In 1932, they had a son, Winston Sharples, Jr., who worked with his father as a music editor and eventually became a musical director himself on The Mighty Hercules. They also had a daughter, Daisy Sharples. After the death of his first wife in 1937, he married Carmela Parrino, an accomplished musician herself, and had a second son, Michael Sharples.

== Death ==
Winston Sharples died at age 69 in Hilton Head, South Carolina.
