= The Very Best of Judy Garland =

Greatest hits album by Judy Garland
- Released: February 22, 2007
- Recorded: 1955-1964
- Label: EMI Gold
- Producer: Cy Godfrey

Judy Garland chronology
The Essential Judy Garland (2006)	The Very Best of Judy Garland (2007)	Lost Tracks 1929–1959 (2010)

The Very Best of Judy Garland: The Capitol Recordings 1955-1965 is a three-disc box set of Judy Garland songs released in 2007 by EMI Gold. The set features previously unreleased and digitally remastered tracks. The album received favorable reviews.

== Album details ==
The Very Best of Judy Garland: The Capitol Recordings, 1955–1965 is a three-disc compilation released by EMI, comprising 72 tracks from Garland's years with Capitol Records. The set draws primarily on her studio albums recorded between 1955 and 1960, including Miss Show Business (1955), Judy (1956), Alone (1957), Judy in Love (1958), The Letter (1959), and That's Entertainment! (1960). It also features selections from Garland at the Grove (1959), Just for Openers (1964), Judy Garland Live! (1989), Judy in London (1960), the soundtrack to I Could Go On Singing (1962), as well as live performances from Judy at Carnegie Hall (1961).

The compilation includes familiar songs such as "Over the Rainbow", Garland's movie medley, and "Judy at the Palace", alongside lesser-known recordings from her Capitol catalogue. Two selections from Judy at Carnegie Hall, "The Man That Got Away" and "If Love Were All", are included, as well as a previously unreleased take of "Over the Rainbow" from Judy in London and a track from the unfinished Live at Manhattan Center recording session, "Just in Time". The three discs were digitally remastered, in some cases from original master tapes, and the set includes a 22-page illustrated booklet featuring an appreciation by Will Friedwald and track-by-track information.

== Critical reception ==
Professional ratings
Review scores
Source	Rating
AllMusic	4/5 stars

AllMusic described it as "the perfect accompaniment" to Judy at Carnegie Hall for listeners wishing to explore Garland's Capitol years. He praised Judy and Alone, included in the three-disc set, as "career landmarks" and "a pair of the best vocal albums of the '50s", highlighting their arrangements by Nelson Riddle and Gordon Jenkins, which "pulled out all the stops in a manner that had only ever appeared on Sinatra albums".

ARSC Journal praised the compilation's "superb digital remastering", which revealed "the emotional potency of Garland's vocals", and highlighted its selection of lesser-known recordings. They described her interpretations of songs such as "Just a Memory" and "Among My Souvenirs" as deeply personal, concluding that Garland's "vocal prowess, and emotive power" made her "the equal of any singer of the golden age of American music".

== Track listing ==
The Very Best Of Judy Garland – Disc 1
No.	Title	Writer(s)	Album	Length
1.	"This Is the Time of the Evening / While We're Young"	Roger Edens; Leonar Gershe	Miss Show Business	4:48
2.	"Medley: You Made Me Love You (I Didn't Want to Do It) / For Me and My Gal / The Boy Next Door / The Trolley Song"	James V. Monaco; Joseph McCarthy; George W. Meyer; Edgar Leslie; E. Ray Goetz; Hugh Martin; Ralph Blane	Miss Show Business	6:17
3.	"A Pretty Girl Milking Her Cow"	Traditional; arr. by Edens	Miss Show Business	3:03
4.	"Carolina in the Morning"	Walter Donaldson; Gus Kahn	Miss Show Business	3:04
5.	"Rock-a-Bye Your Baby with a Dixie Melody"	Jean Schwartz; Sam M. Lewis; Joe Young	Miss Show Business	2:38
6.	"Danny Boy"	Fred E. Weatherly	Miss Show Business	3:04
7.	"Over the Rainbow"	Arlen; Harburg	Miss Show Business	3:31
8.	"Come Rain or Come Shine"	Harold Arlen; Johnny Mercer	Judy	3:43
9.	"Just Imagine"	Ray Henderson; Lew Brown; Buddy DeSylva	Judy	2:54
10.	"I Feel a Song Coming On"	Dorothy Fields; Jimmy McHugh; George Oppenheimer	Judy	2:10
11.	"Last Night When We Were Young"	Harold Arlen; Yip Harburg	Judy	3:28
12.	"Life Is Just a Bowl of Cherries"	Ray Henderson; Lew Brown	Judy	1:57
13.	"April Showers"	Louis Silvers; Buddy DeSylva	Judy	3:16
14.	"Maybe I'll Come Back"	Charles C. Cook; Howard Jeffrey	Judy	2:19
15.	"Dirty Hands, Dirty Face"	James V. Monaco; Al Jolson; Grant Clarke; Edgar Leslie	Judy	4:47
16.	"Lucky Day"	Ray Henderson; Lew Brown; Buddy DeSylva	Judy	2:47
17.	"Memories of You"	Eubie Blake; Andy Razaf	Judy	3:37
18.	"Any Place I Hang My Hat Is Home"	Harold Arlen; Johnny Mercer	Judy	4:06
19.	"By Myself"	Howard Dietz; Arthur Schwartz	Alone	2:36
20.	"Little Girl Blue"	Lorenz Hart; Richard Rodgers	Alone	3:40
21.	"Me and My Shadow"	Dave Dreyer; Al Jolson, Billy Rose	Alone	3:41
22.	"Among My Souvenirs"	Edgar Leslie; Horatio Nicholls	Alone	3:04
23.	"I Gotta Right to Sing the Blues"	Harold Arlen; Ted Koehler	Alone	2:50

The Very Best Of Judy Garland – Disc 2
No.	Title	Writer(s)	Album	Length
1.	"I Get the Blues When It Rains"	Bruce Klauber; Harry Stoddard	Alone	3:12
2.	"Mean to Me"	Fred E. Ahlert; Roy Turk	Alone	3:55
3.	"Then You've Never Been Blue"	Ted Fio Rito; Sam M. Lewis; Frances Langford; Joe Young	Alone	2:12
4.	"How About Me"	Irving Berlin	Alone	3:40
5.	"Just a Memory"	Lew Brown; Buddy DeSylva; Ray Henderson	Alone	2:28
6.	"Blue Prelude"	Joe Bishop; Gordon Jenkins	Alone	2:47
7.	"Happy New Year"	Jenkins	Alone	3:12
8.	"It's So Lovely to Be Back in London"		Single release	3:05
9.	"Zing! Went the Strings of My Heart"	James F. Hanley	Judy in Love	3:41
10.	"I Can't Give You Anything but Love, Baby"	Dorothy Fields; Jimmy McHugh	Judy in Love	4:42
11.	"This Is It"	Dorothy Fields; Arthur Schwartz	Judy in Love	2:20
12.	"More Than You Know"	Edward Eliscu; Billy Rose; Vincent Youmans	Judy in Love	3:21
13.	"I Am Loved"	Cole Porter	Judy in Love	3:16
14.	"I Hadn't Anyone Till You"	Ray Noble	Judy in Love	3:35
15.	"I Concentrate on You"	Cole Porter	Judy in Love	3:24
16.	"(I'm) Confessin' (That I Love You)"	Doc Daugherty; Al J. Neiburg; Ellis Reynolds	Judy in Love	2:46
17.	"Do I Love You?"	Cole Porter	Judy in Love	3:18
18.	"Do It Again"	Buddy DeSylva; George Gershwin	Judy in Love	2:45
19.	"Day In, Day Out"	Rube Bloom; Johnny Mercer	Judy in Love	3:59
20.	"After You've Gone (Live)"	Henry Creamer; Turner Layton	Garland at the Grove	2:29
21.	"That's All There Is, There Isn't Anymore**"	Gordon Jenkins	The Letter	2:54
22.	"That's Entertainment!"	Howard Dietz; Arthur Schwartz	That's Entertainment!	2:30
23.	"Who Cares?"	George Gershwin; Ira Gershwin	That's Entertainment!	1:30
24.	"I've Confessed to the Breeze (I Love You)"	Otto Harbach; Vincent Youmans	That's Entertainment!	3:07
25.	"If I Love Again"	Jack Murray; Ben Oakland	That's Entertainment!	2:39

The Very Best Of Judy Garland – Disc 3
No.	Title	Writer(s)	Album	Length
1.	"Yes"	Dory Previn; André Previn	That's Entertainment!	3:13
2.	"Puttin' on the Ritz"	Irving Berlin	That's Entertainment!	1:57
3.	"Old Devil Moon"	Yip Harburg; Burton Lane	That's Entertainment!	2:54
4.	"Down with Love"	Harold Arlen; Yip Harburg	That's Entertainment!	2:09
5.	"Just You, Just Me"	Jesse Greer; Raymond Klages	That's Entertainment!	1:40
6.	"Alone Together"	Howard Dietz; Arthur Schwartz	That's Entertainment!	3:20
7.	"Stormy Weather"	Harold Arlen; Ted Koehler	The London Sessions	4:58
8.	"You Go to My Head"	Haven Gillespie; J. Fred Coots	The London Sessions	3:26
9.	"Judy at the Palace Medley: Shine on Harvest Moon / Some of These Days / My Man / I Don't Care"	Roger Edens; Jack Norworth; Nora Bayes; Shelton Brooks; Willemetz; Channing Pollack; Charles; Maurice Yvain; Sutton; Jean Lennox; Harold Arlen; Ted Koehler	The London Sessions	6:42
10.	"Over the Rainbow"	E.Y. Harburg; Harold Arlen	The London Sessions	3:38
11.	"The Man That Got Away"	Harold Arlen; Ira Gershwin	Judy at Carnegie Hall	4:47
12.	"If Love Were All"	Noël Coward	Judy at Carnegie Hall	2:20
13.	"Comes Once in a Lifetime"	Betty Comden; Adolph Green; Jule Styne	Single release	2:30
14.	"Sweet Danger"	George Forrest; Robert Craig Wright	Single release	2:18
15.	"Just in Time"	Betty Comden; Adolph Green; Jule Styne	Judy Garland Live!	3:26
16.	"It Never Was You (Outtake)"	Kurt Weill; Maxwell Anderson	I Could Go On Singing	4:28
17.	"I Could Go On Singing (2007 Remix)"	Harold Arlen; E. Y. Harburg	I Could Go On Singing	5:05
18.	"It's a Good Day (Live)"	Peggy Lee; Dave Barbour	Just for Openers	2:04
19.	"That's All (Live)"	Alan Brandt; Bob Haymes	Just for Openers	3:10
20.	"Some People (Live)"	Jule Styne; Stephen Sondheim	Just for Openers	2:07
21.	"When the Saints Go Marching In (with Liza Minnelli)"	Traditional	Judy and Liza "Live" at the London Palladium	1:21
22.	"He's Got the Whole World in His Hands / The Brotherhood of Men (with Liza Minnelli)"	Traditional; Frank Loesser	Judy and Liza "Live" at the London Palladium	2:07
23.	"Zing! Went the Strings of My Heart"	James F. Hanley	Judy in Love (Stereo Recordings)	3:41
24.	"I Am Loved"	Cole Porter	Judy in Love (Stereo Recordings)	3:16

== Personnel ==
Credits adapted from The Very Best of Judy Garland CD.

- Box set compiled and produced by Cy Godfrey
- Product managed by Jon Wilson
- Engineered by Dave McEowen at Capitol Studios, Hollywood
- Artwork by Gavin Wright, the Red Room at EMI
