= Classic Judy Garland – The Capitol Years: 1955–1965 =

Compilation album by Judy Garland
- Released: 2002
- Recorded: 1955–1964
- Label: Capitol

Judy Garland chronology
Duets (1998)	Classic Judy Garland – The Capitol Years: 1955–1965 (2002)	The Essential Judy Garland (2006)

Classic Judy Garland – The Capitol Years: 1955–1965 is a compilation album by American singer and actress Judy Garland, released in 2002 by Capitol Records. The two-disc set contains 37 recordings made between 1955 and 1965, compiled and co-produced by Cheryl Pawelski and Scott Schechter. The tracks include selections from Garland's Capitol albums, live performances, re-recordings of earlier signature songs, and material from unreleased projects.

Eight tracks were previously unreleased and made their CD debut on the compilation. The album was arranged chronologically, from sessions for Miss Show Business to recordings of Garland performing with her daughter, Liza Minnelli, at the London Palladium in 1964. Remastered in 24-bit by Bob Norberg, the collection received favorable reviews from critics, who praised its selection of rarities and its documentation of Garland's Capitol years.

== Album details ==
Released in 2002 by Capitol Records, Classic Judy Garland: The Capitol Years 1955–1965 is a two-disc compilation documenting Judy Garland's recordings for the label. Co-produced and co-compiled by Cheryl Pawelski and Scott Schechter, who also wrote the annotations, the collection is arranged chronologically, beginning with sessions for Miss Show Business and concluding with recordings from Garland's performances with her daughter, Liza Minnelli, at the London Palladium in November 1964. Its 37 tracks include songs from Garland's Capitol albums, concert performances, re-recordings of earlier signature songs such as "Over the Rainbow" and "The Man That Got Away", and material from projects that were never completed or released. The selection also includes recordings associated with the Broadway and West End musical theatre of the period, as well as rare British releases, including "Comes Once in a Lifetime" and songs from Maggie May. The set was remastered in 24-bit by Bob Norberg.

Eight of the 37 tracks were previously unreleased and made their CD debut. The first disc includes five recordings from Garland at the Grove, three of which were not included on the original LP, including the previously unheard "Do It Again". The compilation also marked the first CD release of recordings from The Letter, including "The Worst Kind of Man" and "The Red Balloon". The second disc features "Sweet Danger", which was new to CD, and "Why Can't I?", recorded live at the Manhattan Center in New York on April 26, 1962, for a planned but unreleased album titled Judy Takes Broadway. Another previously unreleased track is an alternate master recording of "I Could Go On Singing", from Garland's 1963 film of the same name, distinct from the version used on the film's soundtrack. The collection also includes "The Land of Promises" and "There's Only One Union", both appearing on CD for the first time, and recordings from Garland's 1964 sessions at Abbey Road Studios for the four-track EP Judy Garland Sings Lionel Bart's Maggie May.

== Critical reception ==
Professional ratings
Review scores
Source	Rating
AllMusic	4/5 stars
Calgary Herald	3.5/4 stars

AllMusic praised the collection, noting that the compilers were "careful to balance well-known staples of Garland's concerts and re-recordings of her early signature songs with rarities". The review concluded that the album "makes a strong case for her Capitol years". The Calgary Herald wrote that the album has "some strange material", including "an amusing send-up of Purple People Eater" and "a sly dig at movie singer Jeanette MacDonald" in the introduction to "San Francisco".

ARSC Journal praised the compilation as "a humdinger", writing that the set was "an important addition to the Garland library of recordings", describing Garland as being "at her vocal apex" during her Capitol years. It also praised her alternate version of "I Could Go On Singing", writing that she was "more focused and jubilant" and that the recording was "noticeably sharper with far less hiss than on previous issues".

== Track listing ==
Classic Judy Garland – The Capitol Years: 1955–1965 – Disc 1
No.	Title	Writer(s)	Album	Length
1.	"Over the Rainbow"	Harold Arlen; E.Y. "Yip" Harburg	Miss Show Business	3:32
2.	"Rock-a-Bye Your Baby with a Dixie Melody"	Jean Schwartz; Sam M. Lewis; Joe Young	Miss Show Business	2:40
3.	"Medley: You Made Me Love You (I Didn't Want to Do It) / For Me and My Gal / The Boy Next Door / The Trolley Song"	James V. Monaco; Joseph McCarthy; George W. Meyer; Edgar Leslie; E. Ray Goetz; Hugh Martin; Ralph Blane	Miss Show Business	6:18
4.	"I'm Old Fashioned"	Jerome Kern, Johnny Mercer	Judy	3:23
5.	"Come Rain or Come Shine"	Harold Arlen, Johnny Mercer	Judy	3:44
6.	"Last Night When We Were Young"	Harold Arlen, Yip Harburg	Judy	3:28
7.	"Me and My Shadow"	Dave Dreyer, Al Jolson, Billy Rose	Alone	3:41
8.	"By Myself"	Howard Dietz, Arthur Schwartz	Alone	2:36
9.	"Then You've Never Been Blue"	Ted Fio Rito, Sam M. Lewis, Frances Langford, Joe Young	Alone	2:13
10.	"It's So Lovely to Be Back Again in London"	Roger Edens	Single release	3:02
11.	"Zing! Went the Strings of My Heart"	James F. Hanley	Judy in Love	3:41
12.	"Day In, Day Out"	Johnny Mercer, Rube Bloom	Garland at the Grove	3:23
13.	"I Can't Give You Anything but Love"	Dorothy Fields, Jimmy McHugh	Garland at the Grove	4:59
14.	"Purple People Eater"	Sheb Wooley	Garland at the Grove	3:52
15.	"Do It Again"	Buddy DeSylva, George Gershwin	Garland at the Grove	3:43
16.	"When the Sun Comes Out"	Harold Arlen, Ted Koehler	Garland at the Grove	2:46
17.	"The Worst Kind of Man"	Gordon Jenkins	The Letter	3:36
18.	"The Red Balloon"	Gordon Jenkins	The Letter	2:17

Classic Judy Garland – The Capitol Years: 1955–1965 – Disc 2
No.	Title	Writer(s)	Album	Length
1.	"How Long Has This Been Going On?"	George Gershwin, Ira Gershwin	That's Entertainment!	2:51
2.	"It Never Was You"	Maxwell Anderson, Kurt Weill	That's Entertainment!	3:24
3.	"Swanee"	George Gershwin, Irving Caesar	Judy in London	1:49
4.	"Happiness Is Just a Thing Called Joe"	E. Y. Harburg, Harold Arlen	Judy in London	4:46
5.	"Almost Like Being in Love" / "This Can't Be Love"	Alan Jay Lerner, Frederick Loewe, Lorenz Hart, Richard Rodgers	Judy at Carnegie Hall	4:35
6.	"The Man That Got Away"	Harold Arlen, Ira Gershwin	Judy at Carnegie Hall	4:46
7.	"San Francisco"	Walter Jurmann, Gus Kahn, Bronisław Kaper	Judy at Carnegie Hall	3:51
8.	"Comes Once in a Lifetime"	Anthony Newley, Leslie Bricusse	Single release	2:31
9.	"Sweet Danger"	George Forrest, Robert Craig Wright	Single release	2:18
10.	"Just In Time"	Jule Styne, Betty Comden, Adolph Green	Judy Garland Live!	3:56
11.	"Why Can't I?"	Richard Rodgers, Lorenz Hart	Previously unreleased	4:38
12.	"I Could Go On Singing"	E. Y. Harburg, Harold Arlen	I Could Go On Singing	5:05
13.	"As Long as He Needs Me"	Lionel Bart	Just for Openers	4:23
14.	"The Land of Promises"	Lionel Bart	Judy Garland Sings Lionel Bart's "Maggie May"	3:41
15.	"It's Yourself"	Lionel Bart	Judy Garland Sings Lionel Bart's "Maggie May"	3:07
16.	"There's Only One Union"	Lionel Bart	Judy Garland Sings Lionel Bart's "Maggie May"	2:17
17.	"Maggie May"	Lionel Bart	Judy Garland Sings Lionel Bart's "Maggie May"	2:18
18.	"Don't Rain on My Parade"	Bob Merrill, Jule Styne	"Live" at the London Palladium	3:25
19.	"What Now, My Love?"	Carl Sigman, Gilbert Bécaud	"Live" at the London Palladium	4:38

== Personnel ==
Credits adapted from Classic Judy Garland – The Capitol Years: 1955–1965 CD.

- Produced and compiled by Cheryl Pawelski and Scott Schechter
- Coordination and production: Audrey Bilger, Devin Franchino, Kirk Melloy
- A&R production: Frank Collura, Lee Lodyga
- Project manager: Rick Camino
- 24-Bit Remastering: Bob Norbert at Capitol Studios, Hollywood
- Art Direction: Tommy Steele, Jeff Fey, George Mimnaugh
- Design: Darren Wong/Fresh Squeezed Design
- Photography: Milton H. Greene, CBS, Capitol Archives
- Liner notes: Scott Schechter
- Business affaires: Janine Baker, Frank Lopez, Adam Varon
