= The Essential Judy Garland =

Compilation album by Judy Garland
- Released: 2006
- Recorded: 1956–1962
- Label: Capitol

Judy Garland chronology
Classic Judy Garland – The Capitol Years: 1955–1965 (2002)	The Essential Judy Garland (2006)	The Very Best of Judy Garland (2007)

The Essential Judy Garland is a compilation album by singer Judy Garland, released in 2006.

== Album details ==
The Essential Judy Garland is a 20-track compilation of recordings made by Judy Garland for Capitol Records between 1955 and 1964, including interpretations of songs such as "Come Rain or Come Shine" and "Zing! Went the Strings of My Heart". The album includes studio recordings from her Capitol albums, including Judy and Judy in Love, as well as five songs from sessions arranged by Nelson Riddle at the Capitol Tower. Two performances, "The Man That Got Away" and "Over the Rainbow", are taken from her 1961 live album Judy at Carnegie Hall. The selection also features six recordings from Garland's London sessions in August 1960, like "You Go to My Head", and also alternate performances of "It Never Was You" and "Why Was I Born", both previously unreleased.

== Critical reception ==
Professional ratings
Review scores
Source	Rating
AllMusic	4.5/5 stars

The Monitor praised The Essential as "the perfect summer beach companion" and wrote, "Oh, Judy! You intoxicate our souls with your songs". The News-Press considered it "a worthwhile sampler" for listeners who did not own Garland's Capitol recordings. John Bush of AllMusic praised the compilation for distilling "what made her music great during her middle age", noting that Garland "matched the work of the best" jazz singers of the 1950s. However, he criticized the inclusion of six tracks from her 1960 London sessions, arguing that some "don't deserve pride of place" alongside material from her early Capitol albums.

== Track listing ==
The Essential Judy Garland
No.	Title	Writer(s)	Album	Length
1.	"Life Is Just a Bowl of Cherries"	Harold Arlen; Johnny Mercer	Judy	1:57
2.	"I Happen to Like New York"	Cole Porter	The Garland Touch	2:56
3.	"Comes Once in a Lifetime"	Betty Comden; Adolph Green; Jule Styne	Special Single Release	2:30
4.	"If I Love Again"	Ben Oakland; John Murray	That's Entertainment!	2:40
5.	"The Far Away Part of Town"	André Previn; Dory Langdon	Pepe	4:49
6.	"Zing! Went the Strings of My Heart"	James F. Hanley	Judy in Love	3:41
7.	"You Go to My Head"	Haven Gillespie; J. Fred Coots	The London Sessions	3:26
8.	"The Man That Got Away" (Live)	Harold Arlen; Ira Gershwin	Judy at Carnegie Hall	4:47
9.	"I Get the Blues When It Rains"	Harold Arlen; Ted Koehler	Alone	3:11
10.	"Come Rain or Come Shine"	Harold Arlen; Johnny Mercer	Judy	3:43
11.	"Any Place I Hang My Hat Is Home"	Harold Arlen; Johnny Mercer	Judy	4:08
12.	"It Never Was You" (Outtake)	Kurt Weill; Maxwell Anderson	Previously unreleased	4:28
13.	"Lucky Day"	Buddy G. DeSylva; Lew Brown; Ray Henderson	The Garland Touch	2:34
14.	"Happiness Is Just a Thing Called Joe"	E. Y. Harburg; Harold Arlen	The Garland Touch	4:40
15.	"Hello Bluebird"	Cliff Friend	I Could Go On Singing	4:07
16.	"By Myself"	Arthur Schwartz; Howard Dietz	I Could Go On Singing	4:31
17.	"April Showers"	B. G. DeSylva; Louis Silvers	Judy	3:16
18.	"Why Was I Born?" (Alternate take)	Jerome Kern; Oscar Hammerstein II	Previously unreleased	3:31
19.	"Rock-a-Bye Your Baby (with a Dixie Melody)"	Jean Schwartz; Joe Young; Sam Lewis	The London Sessions	3:09
20.	"Over the Rainbow" (Live)	E. Y. Harburg; Harold Arlen	Judy at Carnegie Hall	4:18

== Personnel ==
Credits adapted from The Essential Judy Garland CD.

- Compilation producers: Cy Geoffrey, Rob Christie
- Mastering: Bob Norberg, Dave McEowen & The Capitol Mastering Studios, Hollywood, CA
- Art direction: Susan Lavoie
- Design: Gabrielle Raumberger and Kimyo Nisho
- Photography: Capitol Photo Archives, MPTV/net
- Liner notes: Lorna Luft, Will Friedwald
- Special thanks to: Scott Schechter
