= The One and Only (Judy Garland album) =

Compilation album by Judy Garland
- Released: 1991
- Recorded: 1955–1964
- Label: Capitol

Judy Garland chronology
The Best of the Decca Years, Volume 1 – Hits! (1990)	The One and Only (1991)	The Complete Decca Masters (plus) (1994)

The One and Only is a four-CD box set by American singer and actress Judy Garland, released in 1991 by Capitol Records. The collection documents Garland's recording career with the label, spanning material recorded between 1955 and 1964 from studio recordings, live performances, and television material drawn from more than a dozen sources, including Garland's Capitol albums, her television series, and performances at the Grove and Carnegie Hall.

The album received generally favorable reviews from contemporary critics. Commercially, the box sold nearly 100,000 copies by April 1992.

== Album details ==
The box set Judy Garland: The One & Only consists of three CDs containing recordings drawn from more than a dozen sources and covering different periods of Judy Garland's career with Capitol Records. The first disc, In the Studio, contains 22 selections taken from studio albums released between 1955 and 1963, including Miss Show Business (1955), Judy (1956), Alone (1957), Judy in Love (1958), That's Entertainment! (1960), and I Could Go On Singing (1963). The disc includes performances of "Zing! Went the Strings of My Heart", "That's Entertainment", "Down with Love", "Carolina in the Morning", "April Showers", and "By Myself", alongside lesser-known songs from Garland's repertoire.

The second disc, At the Footlights, brings together live and television recordings sourced from Garland at the Grove (1958), Judy at Carnegie Hall (1961), Judy Garland Live (recorded in 1962 and released in 1989), Garland's television program, and the 1965 Judy & Liza at the London Palladium album. Among its selections are "Battle Hymn of the Republic", "Don't Rain on My Parade", performed as a duet with Liza Minnelli, and a medley of "We Could Make Such Beautiful Music" and "Bob White (Whatcha Gonna Swing Tonight?)". The third disc, The London Sessions, contains 20 recordings taken from The Garland Touch (1962) and Judy in London (1972), including "Stormy Weather", "Come Rain or Come Shine", "San Francisco", "The Man That Got Away", "Swanee", "Chicago", "After You've Gone", "I Can't Give You Anything but Love", "The Trolley Song", and "Over the Rainbow". The box set also includes a booklet featuring an introduction by Liza Minnelli, notes by Pete Kline, photographs, and reminiscences related to Garland's career.

== Critical reception ==
Professional ratings
Review scores
Source	Rating
AllMusic	4/5 stars
The Encyclopedia of Popular Music	3/5 stars
The Rolling Stone Album Guide	4/5 stars

AllMusic described The One & Only as "an intelligently programmed box set" that presents the highlights of Judy Garland's mature recording career, noting that she was "in good voice" on the previously limited-distribution 1960 England recordings and that, in some cases, these versions "best the earlier renditions". The USA Today review called it "one of the classiest pre-rock pop recordings ever made", praised Garland's singing as "elegant, restrained and precise", and said the collection reveals her voice "growing deeper and richer" with "the emotional content hotter", concluding that the set helps listeners "discover why she won such worship".

The Chicago Tribune wrote that "by far [The One and Only is] the most thrilling of the new boxed sets", praising it for capturing "the astonishing musical and dramatic range" of Garland, while describing the London Sessions disc as "the gem of the set" and saying that "virtually every track is a scorcher". The Washington Post praised Garland for her "genial warmth, exuberance and a pure, natural delivery", said that "working before an audience of any size seemed to draw the best out of Garland as both singer and actress", and described the 1960 London sessions as "a great lost Garland album", concluding that the 1951–1961 period "proved to be the best time of Judy Garland's erratic career".

The Rolling Stone Album Guide considered the compilation as a "lush box set" that is "primarily for Garland maniacs". The Record called it "a worthy addition to any Garland collection", praised its recordings as "splendid", and ultimately described it as "a definitive greatest hits package" and "a thoughtful compilation of her Capitol recordings", concluding that, alongside Judy at Carnegie Hall, it was "a testament to Garland's timeless contribution to popular music as an inspired interpreter, spirited belter, and truly brilliant all-around entertainer". In a later review, the journal criticized the album later selections for "poor audio quality and ragged Garland performances", concluding bluntly, "Just because something has never been released doesn't mean it should be!".

== Commercial performance ==
By April 1992, the album sold nearly 100,000 copies.

== Track listing ==
=== The One and Only ===
CD 1: In the Studio
No.	Title	Writer(s)	Album	Length
1.	"This Is the Time of the Evening"	Leonard Gershe, Roger Edens	Miss Show Business	2:32
2.	"While We're Young"	Alec Wilder, Morty Palitz, William Engvick	Miss Show Business	2:16
3.	"Carolina in the Morning"	Gus Kahn, Walter Donaldson	Miss Show Business	3:04
4.	"Danny Boy"	Fred E. Weatherly	Miss Show Business	3:05
5.	"A Pretty Girl Milking Her Cow"	Roger Edens	Miss Show Business	3:04
6.	"Last Night When We Were Young"	E.Y. Harburg, Harold Arlen	Judy	3:27
7.	"April Showers"	B.G. DeSylva, Louis Silvers	Judy	3:15
8.	"Dirty Hands, Dirty Face"	Al Jolson, Edgar Leslie, Grant Clarke, James V. Monaco	Judy	4:46
9.	"Memories of You"	Andy Razaf, Eubie Blake	Judy	3:36
10.	"By Myself"	Howard Dietz, Arthur Schwartz	Alone	2:35
11.	"Me and My Shadow"	Al Jolson, Billy Rose, Dave Dreyer	Alone	3:40
12.	"Little Girl Blue"	Lorenz Hart, Richard Rodgers	Alone	3:39
13.	"I Get the Blues When It Rains"	Harry Stoddard, Marcy Klauber	Alone	3:11
14.	"Zing! Went the Strings of My Heart"	James Hanley	Judy in Love	3:48
15.	"I Hadn't Anyone Till You"	Ray Noble	Judy in Love	3:33
16.	"More Than You Know"	Billy Rose, Edward Eliscu, Vincent Youmans	Judy in Love	3:20
17.	"That's Entertainment"	Howard Dietz, Arthur Schwartz	That's Entertainment!	2:28
18.	"Down with Love"	E.Y. Harburg, Harold Arlen	That's Entertainment!	2:14
19.	"Old Devil Moon"	Burton Lane, E.Y. Harburg	That's Entertainment!	2:53
20.	"I've Confessed to the Breeze (I Love You)"	Otto Harbach, Vincent Youmans	That's Entertainment!	3:29
21.	"Hello Bluebird"	Cliff Friend	I Could Go On Singing	4:06
22.	"I Could Go On Singing (Till the Cows Come Home)"	E.Y. Harburg, Harold Arlen	I Could Go On Singing	5:02

CD 2: At the Footlights
No.	Title	Writer(s)	Album	Length
1.	"Garland Overture: The Trolley Song; Over the Rainbow; The Man that Got Away" (Freddy Martin and His Orchestra)	Hugh Martin, Ralph Blane; E.Y. Harburg, Harold Arlen; Harold Arlen, Ira Gershwin	Garland at the Grove	4:00
2.	"When You're Smiling (The Whole World Smiles With You)"	Joe Goodwin, Larry Shay, Mark Fisher	Garland at the Grove	3:20
3.	"Day In - Day Out"	Johnny Mercer, Rube Bloom	Garland at the Grove	3:11
4.	"I Can't Give You Anything But Love"	Dorothy Fields, Jimmy McHugh	Garland at the Grove	4:42
5.	"When the Sun Comes Out"	Harold Arlen, Ted Koehler	Garland at the Grove	2:46
6.	"Who Cares? (As Long As You Care for Me)"	Ira Gershwin, George Gershwin	Judy at Carnegie Hall	3:23
7.	"Puttin' on the Ritz"	Irving Berlin	Judy at Carnegie Hall	2:47
8.	"How Long Has This Been Going On?"	Ira Gershwin, George Gershwin	Judy at Carnegie Hall	4:10
9.	"Just You, Just Me"	Jesse Greer, Raymond Klages	Judy at Carnegie Hall	1:26
10.	"Hey, Look Me Over"	Carolyn Leigh, Cy Coleman	Judy Garland Live!	2:52
11.	"Joey, Joey, Joey"	Frank Loesser	Judy Garland Live!	3:12
12.	"The Party's Over"	Betty Comden, Adolph Green, Jule Styne	Judy Garland Live!	3:34
13.	"I Wish You Love"	A.A. Beach, Charles Trenet	Just for Openers	4:07
14.	"As Long as He Needs Me"	Lionel Bart	Just for Openers	4:16
15.	"More"	Nino Oliviero, Norman Newell, Riz Ortolani	Just for Openers	2:49
16.	"Battle Hymn of the Republic"	Julia Ward Howe, William Steffe	Just for Openers	4:35
17.	"Closing Theme: Maybe I'll Come Back"	Charles L. Cooke, Howard C. Jeffrey	Just for Openers	1:46
18.	"We Could Make Such Beautiful Music; Bob White (Whatcha Gonna Swing Tonight?)" (with Liza Minnelli)	H. Kautzman, Robert Sour; Bernie Hanigan, Johnny Mercer	Live at the London Palladium	1:55
19.	"Don't Rain on My Parade" (with Liza Minnelli)	Bob Merrill, Jule Styne	Live at the London Palladium	2:54
20.	"Smile"	Charles Chaplin, Geoffrey Parsons, John Turner	Live at the London Palladium	3:08
21.	"Just in Time"	Betty Comden, Adolph Green, Jule Styne	Live at the London Palladium	3:51
22.	"Make Someone Happy"	Betty Comden, Adolph Green, Jule Styne	Live at the London Palladium	2:11
23.	"Once in a Lifetime"	Betty Comden, Adolph Green, Jule Styne	Live at the London Palladium	2:54

CD 3: The London Sessions
No.	Title	Writer(s)	Album	Length
1.	"Lucky Day"	B.G. DeSylva, Ray Henderson, Brown	The Garland Touch	2:32
2.	"Judy at the Palace; Shine On Harvest Moon; Some of These Days; My Man; I Don't Care" (Medley)	Roger Edens; Jack Norworth, Nora Bayes; Shelton Brooks; Willemetz, Channing Pollack, Charles, Maurice Yvain; Sutton, Jean Lennox	The Garland Touch	6:41
3.	"Stormy Weather"	Harold Arlen, Ted Koehler	Judy in London	5:01
4.	"You Go to My Head"	Haven Gillespie, J. Fred Coots	Judy in London	3:23
5.	"Come Rain or Come Shine"	Johnny Mercer, Harold Arlen	Judy in London	3:41
6.	"San Francisco"	Bronislaw Kaper, Gus Kahn, Walter Jurmann	Judy in London	3:21
7.	"The Man That Got Away"	Harold Arlen, Ira Gershwin	Judy in London	4:07
8.	"Swanee"	George Gershwin, Irving Caesar	Judy in London	1:47
9.	"Rock-A-Bye Your Baby with a Dixie Melody"	Jean Schwartz, Joe Young, Sam M. Lewis	Judy in London	3:08
10.	"Happiness Is a Thing Called Joe"	E.Y. Harburg, Harold Arlen	The Garland Touch	4:44
11.	"It's a Great Day for the Irish"	Roger Edens	The Garland Touch	2:17
12.	"You'll Never Walk Alone"	Oscar Hammerstein II, Richard Rodgers	The Garland Touch	4:01
13.	"I Happen to Like New York"	Cole Porter	The Garland Touch	2:54
14.	"You Made Me Love You; For Me and My Gal; The Trolley Song" (Medley)	James Monaco, Joe McCarthy; Ray Goetz, Edgar Leslie, George W. Meyer; Hugh Martin, Ralph Blane	The Garland Touch	5:38
15.	"Why Was I Born?"	Oscar Hammerstein II, Jerome Kern	Judy in London	3:38
16.	"Do It Again"	B.G. DeSylva, George Gershwin	Judy in London	4:27
17.	"Chicago"	Fred Fisher	Judy in London	2:28
18.	"I Can't Give You Anything But Love"	Dorothy Fields, Jimmy McHugh	Judy in London	4:43
19.	"After You're Gone"	Henry Creamer, Turner Layton	Judy in London	2:16
20.	"Over the Rainbow"	E.Y. Harburg, Harold Arlen	Judy in London	3:37

== Personnel ==
Credits adapted from The One and Only box set.

- Produced and compiled by Pete Kline
- Executive Producers: Wayne Watkins and Clark Duval
- Liner notes by Emily Coleman
- Track-by-track commentary by Todd Everett
- Project coordinated by Mark Dix
- Remastered by Kevin Reeves, Capitol Recording Studios, June-July 1991
- Art direction by Tommy Steele
- Design by Heather Van Haaften
- Photo research by Grad Benedict
