= The Garland Touch =

Studio album by Judy Garland
- Released: August 6, 1962
- Recorded: October 11, 1957 – October 13, 1961
- Studios: EMI Studios (London, England); Capitol West Studios (New York, NY); Capitol Studios (Los Angeles, CA)
- Genre: Show tunes
- Length: 34:43
- Label: Capitol

Judy Garland chronology
Judy at Carnegie Hall (1961)	The Garland Touch (1962)	Gay Purr-ee (1962)

Singles from The Garland Touch
- 1. "Once in a Lifetime" Released: October 1961

The Garland Touch is the final studio album by Judy Garland, released on August 6, 1962, by Capitol Records. The album compiles recordings from different periods, including six previously unreleased tracks recorded in London in August 1960 and four songs drawn from earlier releases, two from Judy in Love (1958) and two from a 1961 single.

The album was well received by contemporary critics, who praised Garland's vocal performance and regarded it as a strong and appealing release, though later reviews described it as a "patchwork collection" that nonetheless "contains some winning performances". Commercially, it peaked at No. 38 (monaural) and No. 19 (stereo) on the Cash Box charts, and at No. 33 (monaural) and No. 35 (stereo) on the Billboard charts, while also contributing to a rise in pop album sales for Capitol Records in late 1962.

== Album details ==
The album assembles recordings made for other projects: six previously unissued selections had been cut in London in early August 1960, while four songs had been previously released—two on the 1958 album Judy in Love ("Do I Love You?" and "More Than You Know") and two from her recent 1961 single ("Comes Once in a Lifetime" and "Sweet Danger").

This was Garland's last studio album released during her lifetime. Later in London, Garland cut a 1964 EP for EMI Records: Judy Garland Sings Lionel Bart's Maggie May, which Capitol Records did not release in the United States until 2002 (on the compilation CD Classic Judy Garland: The Capitol Years 1955-1965). The rest of Garland's releases prior to her death in 1969 came from various concerts and soundtracks: recordings for the films Gay Purr-ee (1962) and I Could Go On Singing (1963); from her 1963–1964 CBS Television series, The Judy Garland Show; from 1964 concert performances at the London Palladium (featuring solos and duets with her daughter Liza Minnelli); and from Garland's last engagement at the Palace Theatre in 1967.

== Critical reception ==
Professional ratings
Review scores
Source	Rating
AllMusic	3.5/5 stars
New Record Mirror	5/5 stars

Billboard described the album as "a solid sequel to" Judy at Carnegie Hall that "still found" Garland "in fine voice, as good vocally as she has been at any time in her revived career", and called it a "strong entry for jocks and stores". Cash Box stated that Garland "equally superb on either ballads or up-tempo items", they described the album as a "delightful Capitol package" and concluded that the "disk should score heavily in the coin department".

Jimmy Watson of New Record Mirror called it as "a collector's item", praised that "she's the world's number one trouper" who "sings from deep inside" and "uses her songs afresh each time she performs them", and concluded writing that "this one's going into my special corner reserved for top favourite discs".

In a retrospective review William Ruhlmann of AllMusic noted that the album is "a patchwork collection" that is "not a worthy successor to Judy at Carnegie Hall" though it "contains some winning performances" and finds Garland "certainly in good voice".

== Commercial performance ==
The album debuted on August 18, 1962, on the Cash Box chart, reaching a peak of No. 38 on the monaural albums chart, where it spent 11 weeks, and No. 19 on the stereo chart, where it spent 12 weeks. According to an October 27, 1962 report by the magazine, The Garland Touch was one of the releases that contributed to the significant increase in pop album sales for Capitol Records in the company's first fiscal quarter.

On 22 September 1962, the album peaked at No. 33 (monaural) and No. 35 (stereo) on the Billboard Top LP's charts.

== Track listing ==
The Garland Touch
No.	Title	Writer(s)	Length
1.	"Lucky Day"	Buddy DeSylva, Lew Brown, Ray Henderson	2:28
2.	"I Happen to Like New York"	Cole Porter	2:49
3.	"Comes Once in a Lifetime"	Jule Styne, Betty Comden, Adolph Green	2:30
4.	"Judy at the Palace (Medley)" (Shine on Harvest Moon; Some of These Days; My Man; I Don't Care)	Nora Bayes, Jack Norworth; Shelton Brooks; Albert Willemetz, Maurice Yvain, Channing Pollock; Harry O. Sutton, Jean Lenox	6:42
5.	"Happiness is a Thing Called Joe"	Harold Arlen, Yip Harburg	4:39
6.	"Sweet Danger"	Robert Wright, George Forrest	2:18
7.	"You'll Never Walk Alone"	Richard Rodgers, Oscar Hammerstein II	3:59
8.	"Do I Love You?"	Cole Porter	3:15
9.	"More Than You Know"	Vincent Youmans, Billy Rose, Edward Eliscu	3:24
10.	"It's a Great Day for the Irish"	Roger Edens	2:16

== Charts ==
Weekly charts for The Garland Touch
Chart (1962)	Peak position
US Top LP's - Monaural (Billboard)	33
US Top LP's - Stereo (Billboard)	35
US Best Selling Albums - Monaural (Cash Box)	38
US Best Selling Albums - Stereo (Cash Box)	19
