= The Best of the Decca Years, Volume 1 – Hits! =

Compilation album by Judy Garland
- Released: 1990
- Recorded: 1937–1945
- Labels: Decca, MCA

Judy Garland chronology
Judy Garland Live! (1989)	The Best of the Decca Years, Volume 1 – Hits! (1990)	The One and Only (1990)

The Best of the Decca Years, Volume 1 – Hits! is a compilation album released in 1990 by Decca and MCA Records, containing 14 tracks spanning Judy Garland' record career with Decca from 1937 to 1945.

The album received mostly favorable reviews.

== Album details ==
The album was the first official Decca CD compilation of Judy Garland's Decca recordings, with the tracks digitally transferred from original Decca metal parts transfers. The booklet contains an essay on Garland by Max Preeo and provides information on the recordings. The booklet incorrectly identifies "On the Atchison, Topeka and the Santa Fe" as the September 10, 1945, re-recording, although the compilation contains the rejected May 15, 1945, recording.

== Critical reception ==
Professional ratings
Review scores
Source	Rating
AllMusic	4.5/5 stars
The Rolling Stone Album Guide	3/5 stars

CD Review praised the album, noting that Garland's voice "withstands the test of time" and describing "Over the Rainbow", "Meet Me in St. Louis", and "The Trolley Song" simply as "classic".

Roxane Orgill included the album, along with Judy at Carnegie Hall, in her book Shout, Sister, Shout!: Ten Girl Singers Who Shaped a Century as essential recordings for introducing new fans to Garland. ARSC Journal criticized the 2020 Decca SHM-CD edition for its "incredibly scratchy" sources and lack of noise removal, singling out "A Pretty Girl Milking Her Cow" for being "awash in reverb"; the critic found the rest of the disc "dull, far inferior to earlier Decca releases" and concluded that "No care has been taken in releasing these historic sides".

== Track listing ==
The Best of the Decca Years, Volume 1 – Hits!
No.	Title	Writer(s)	Length
1.	"Dear Mr. Gable / You Made Me Love You"	V. Monaco, J. McCarthy	3:11
2.	"Over the Rainbow"	E. Y. Harburg, Harold Arlen	2:48
3.	"Zing! Went the Strings of My Heart"	James F. Hanley	2:55
4.	"Embraceable You"	George Gershwin, Ira Gershwin	2:50
5.	"I'm Nobody's Baby"	Benny Davis, Lester Santley, Milton Ager	2:52
6.	"Friendship"	Cole Porter	2:33
7.	"Our Love Affair"	Arthur Freed, Roger Edens	2:55
8.	"How About You?"	Burton Lane, Ralph Freed	2:59
9.	"For Me and My Gal"	E. Ray Goetz, Edgar Leslie, George W. Meyer	2:29
10.	"The Boy Next Door"	Hugh Martin, Ralph Blane	3:05
11.	"The Trolley Song"	Hugh Martin, Ralph Blane	2:51
12.	"Meet Me in St. Louis, Louis"	Hugh Martin, Ralph Blane	2:12
13.	"Yah-Ta-Ta, Yah-Ta-Ta (Talk, Talk, Talk)"	Johnny Burke, James Van Heusen	3:07
14.	"On the Atchison, Topeka and the Santa Fe"	Harry Warren, Johnny Mercer	3:11

== Personnel ==
Credits adapted from The Best of the Decca Years, Volume 1 – Hits! CD.

- Compiled by Max Preeo and Milt Gabler
- Coordinated by Andy McKaie
- Series Consultant: Milt Gabler
- Art Direction: Vartan
- Design: Junie Osaki
- Photographs: Courtesy Frank Driggs Collection
- Digitally transferred from original Decca metal parts transfers by Doug Schwartz, MCA Studios, North Hollywood, CA
