= Cal Tjader Plays Harold Arlen =

Studio album by Cal Tjader
- Released: February 1962
- Recorded: June 1 and 2, 1960
- Genre: Jazz
- Labels: Fantasy; 3330 (mono); 8072 (stereo)

Cal Tjader chronology
| Cal Tjader Plays, Mary Stallings Sings (1962) | Cal Tjader Plays Harold Arlen (1962) | Latino Con Cal Tjader (1962) |

Professional ratings
Review scores
| Source | Rating |
|---|---|
| Allmusic | 3/5 stars |
| Billboard | "Special Merit" |
| The Washington Post | favorable |
| Down Beat | 4/5 stars |

Cal Tjader Plays Harold Arlen is an album by American vibraphonist Cal Tjader, five of its 11 tracks arranged by Tjader's longtime colleague Clare Fischer. Recorded in June 1960 and released in February 1962 on the Fantasy label, it would be reissued on CD – together with Tjader's similarly semi-orchestral 1961 LP, West Side Story (by which time Fischer had become Tjader's full-time pianist and musical director) – on July 30, 2002, as Cal Tjader Plays Harold Arlen and West Side Story.

The original Arlen LP is neatly divided, in terms of personnel, between sides 1 and 2, the former consisting solely of Tjader, backed by piano, bass and drums, and the latter supplementing that unit with a string section and harp, arranged and conducted by Fischer. Notwithstanding its belated release (more than a year after West Side Story), this appears to be the first recorded collaboration between Fischer and Tjader, who would remain close, both personally and professionally, until Tjader's death in 1982. (Note: While it's clear the Harold Arlen LP was not released until January 1962 at the earliest, if the 2002 CD reissue notes can be believed, it was actually recorded in June 1960, well before West Side Story.)

== Reception ==
Allmusic's Richie Unterberger gives the album three stars, noting in it a certain monotony of mood and tempo, to which the Fischer tracks offer a welcome contrast:

Clare Fischer's tense orchestral arrangements actually add a bit of wakeup spice to the latter part of the program, even as they heighten the sentimentality factor in some respects.

Contemporaneous reviews likewise highlighted Fischer's efforts; the album's bipartite structure was duly noted by Billboard Magazine, with kudos reserved for side two:

Tjader is heard in two contrasting types of ensemble. Side 1 has the vibes player in his usual small combo setting, while the flip side makes use of some unique section work with arrangements written by Clare Fischer. Better tracks include "Over the Rainbow," "The Man That Got Away," and "Blues in the Night."

The Washington Post's Tony Gieske elaborates on Fischer's contribution: (Note: See Gieske's comments regarding a pair of earlier Clare Fischer-arranged LPs, West Side Story and A Portrait of Duke Ellington.)

Fischer's arrangements on one side of Cal Tjader Plays Harold Arlen are marked by unashamed eclecticism. He swipes string-section sounds (icy and twangy by turns) from the moderns, steals chords from Bartók's string quartets, throws in some Hollywood soundtrack stuff, conks on the bare piano strings, and fools around with counter-rhythms.

"Over the Rainbow" opens with a lot of out of tempo effects, then has Tjader take the melody in a yearning six-eight, the strings playing against him in four. Like the other pieces, this abounds in tempo shifts, all of which work out swingingly.

The most amazing thing, though, is that Fischer is theatrical. That is, all his tricks are just bright enough to keep the arrangements fresh without taking away from the sentimentality of Arlen's songs. He never gets solemn or super complex, like Russo. If Arlen says the mood is 'Bluesy,' Fischer doesn't try to correct him.

Fischer's overriding purpose, I believe, is to entertain. Conservatory-trained, he is rationing out language that must seem common currency to him, and trying to get it into the common currency of the public at large. I hope he succeeds. I hope the Broadway boys will listen to him. I hope the jazz-band boys will listen to him. A half-century of the same voicings is enough.

== Track listing ==
1. "Between the Devil and the Deep Blue Sea" (Arlen-Ted Koehler) - 3:03
2. "Ill Wind (You're Blowing Me No Good)" (Arlen - Koehler) - 4:22
3. "When the Sun Comes Out" (Arlen - Koehler) - 2:39
4. "Happiness is a Thing Called Joe" (Arlen - Yip Harburg) - 3:22
5. "I Gotta Right to Sing the Blues" (Arlen-Koehler) - 3:40
6. "Come Rain or Come Shine" (Arlen-Johnny Mercer) - 3:49
7. "Over the Rainbow" (Arlen-Harburg) - 3:48
8. "Out of This World" (Arlen-Mercer) - 2:50
9. "Last Night When We Were Young" (Arlen-Harburg) - 3:06
10. "The Man That Got Away" (Arlen-Ira Gershwin) - 3:58
11. "Blues in the Night" (Arlen-Mercer) - 3:25

== Personnel ==
- Cal Tjader - vibraphone
- Buddy Motsinger - piano
- Al McKibbon - bass (tracks 1–6)
- Red Mitchell - bass (tracks 7–11)
- Willie Bobo - drums (tracks 1–6)
- Johnny Rae - drums (tracks 7–11)
- Unidentified harp (tracks 7–11)
- 8 unidentified violins (tracks 7–11)
- 3 unidentified viole (tracks 7–11)
- 2 unidentified celli (tracks 7–11)
- Clare Fischer - arranger, conductor (tracks 7–11)
