= Gay Purr-ee (soundtrack) =

1962 album

Soundtrack album by various artists
- Released: 1962
- Recorded: November 1961
- Studios: Capitol Records Studios, Hollywood, California
- Length: 33:40
- Label: Warner
- Producer: Henry G. Saperstein (executive producer)

Judy Garland chronology
The Garland Touch (1962)	Gay Purr-ee (1962)	I Could Go On Singing (1963)

Gay Purr-ee is the soundtrack album to the 1962 animated film of the same name, featuring performances by Judy Garland alongside Robert Goulet, Red Buttons, Hermione Gingold and Paul Frees, with a score by Harold Arlen and Yip Harburg.

Released by Warner Bros. Records, the album was promoted through an extensive campaign tied to the film's release, including a large-scale commercial partnership with the Carnation Company, and was later reissued on CD in 2003 with additional demo recordings by its composers. The album received favorable reviews, being described as "attractive" and "melodic" by some outlets.

== Background and release ==
The soundtrack of the 1962 animated film Gay Purr-ee features Judy Garland in her first role dubbing an animated character, along with Robert Goulet, Red Buttons, Hermione Gingold and Paul Frees, with a score by Harold Arlen and Yip Harburg. The two composers penned Garland's now-famous "Over the Rainbow" from The Wizard of Oz. The songs were recorded in at Capitol Records Studios, Hollywood, California, November 1961.

To promoted the album, Warner Bros. Records arranged a tie-in with the Carnation Company, as part of a campaign coordinated with Warner Bros. Pictures and UPA following the label's acquisition of the soundtrack rights, in which the album cover of Gay Purr-ee was reproduced on 15,000,000 Friskies Cat Food packages alongside advertising for both the LP and the film. The campaign also included a four-color Life magazine advertisement, a children's coupon contest for free cinema admission, the distribution of 5,000 albums to supermarket buyers, and coordinated in-store displays promoting both the record and the Friskies product line.

On November 4, 2003, Rhino Handmade, a division of the Warner Music Group, released the soundtrack on CD. This released was identical to the 1962 LP version but contained 5 additional demo tracks, performed by Harold Arlen and E. Y. "Yip" Harburg.

== Single ==
"Paris Is a Lonely Town" was released as a single together with "Little Drops of Rain". Billboard described the first song as "a lovely side" from Judy Garland, noting its "moving Garland sound against sweeping ork backing". Howard Thompson in the New York Times praised the song as a "knockout" and "one of Mr. Alen's great blues members written for the screen". "Little Drops of Rain" was described by the Billboard as "a pretty tune", noting that it is given "a spinnable reading".

== Critical reception ==
Professional ratings
Review scores
Source	Rating
AllMusic	4.5/5 stars
New Record Mirror	4/5 stars

Cash Box described the album as featuring "a delightful new score", noting that Judy Garland is "in perfect voice" and predicting "rapid acceptance" for the release. New Record Mirror wrote that "the score is most attractive". Billboard described the album as "a sure-fire package", noting that the songs are "pretty and melodic" and recall the spirit of The Wizard of Oz. Harold Patton of Calgary Herald praised the soundtrack as "a captivating score that is treated with great style", and it was listed by Williamson Daily News as one of the mono LPs of the week. High Fidelity considered the album "an almost unbearably embarrassing venture into what I can only describe, sourly, as 'whumsey'".

In a retrospective review, AllMusic described the soundtrack as "one of [Judy Garland's] most beloved [works] by enthusiasts of all ages", praising its "memorable compositions", while noting that the expanded edition features "an absolutely stunning remaster".

== Track listing ==
Gay Purr-ee track listing
No.	Title	Writer(s)	Performer	Length
1.	"Gay Purr-ee Overture"	E. Y. Harburg, Harold Arlen	Judy Garland & The Chorus	3:56
2.	"Mewsette"	Harold Arlen	Robert Goulet	1:04
3.	"Little Drops Of Rain"	Harold Arlen	Judy Garland	3:26
4.	"The Money Cat"	E. Y. Harburg, Harold Arlen	Paul Frees and The Mellomen	2:15
5.	"Portraits Of Mewsette"	E. Y. Harburg, Harold Arlen	Orchestra	3:28
6.	"Take My Hand Paree"	Harold Arlen	Judy Garland	2:55
7.	"Paris Is A Lonely Town"	Harold Arlen	Judy Garland	4:12
8.	"Bubbles"	E. Y. Harburg, Harold Arlen	Robert Goulet, Red Buttons and The Mellowmen	2:47
9.	"Roses Red, Violets Blue"	Harold Arlen	Judy Garland	1:59
10.	"Little Drops Of Rain"	Harold Arlen	Robert Goulet	1:27
11.	"Variation - Paris Is A Lonely Town"	E. Y. Harburg, Harold Arlen	Orchestra	1:55
12.	"The Horse Won't Talk"	Harold Arlen	Paul Frees	1:44
13.	"The Mewsette Finale"	E. Y. Harburg, Harold Arlen	Judy Garland, Robert Goulet and The Chorus	2:32

Gay Purr-ee 2003 CD bonus tracks
No.	Title	Writer(s)	Performer	Length
14.	"Roses Red, Violets Blue" (demo)	Harold Arlen, E. Y. "Yip" Harburg	Harold Arlen and E. Y. "Yip" Harburg	1:43
15.	"The Money Cat" (demo)	Harold Arlen, E. Y. "Yip" Harburg	Harold Arlen and E. Y. "Yip" Harburg	2:10
16.	"The Horse Won't Talk" (demo)	Harold Arlen	Harold Arlen	3:46
17.	"Little Drops of Rain" (demo)	Harold Arlen	Harold Arlen	2:39
18.	"Paris is a Lonely Town" (demo)	Harold Arlen	Harold Arlen	2:46

== Personnel ==
Credits adapted from Gay Purr-ee LP.

- Executive-Producer: Henry G. Saperstein
- Written by Dorothy & Chuck Jones
- Music by Harold Arlen
- Lyrics by E. Y. Harburg
- Orchestrated and conducted by Mort Lindsey
- Directed by Abe Levitow from Warner Bros.
