= Bob Norberg =

Bob Norberg may refer to:

- Bob Norberg (songwriter) (fl. 1960s–1970s), songwriter who collaborated with Brian Wilson and the Beach Boys in the early 1960s
- Bob Norberg (engineer) (fl. 1960s–2010s), recording engineer for Capitol Records in the 1960s
