= Garland at the Grove =

Live album by Judy Garland
- Released: Mono version: February 2, 1959 Stereo version: February 16, 1959
- Recorded: August 5, 1958
- Venues: Cocoanut Grove nightclub at the Ambassador Hotel, Los Angeles
- Length: 57:14
- Label: Capitol

Judy Garland chronology
| Judy in Love (1958) | Garland at the Grove (1959) | The Letter (1959) |

Garland at the Grove is the debut live album by Judy Garland. It was released in mono on February 2, 1959 and in stereo on February 16, 1959, by Capitol Records, and accompanied by Freddy Martin and his orchestra. The album was recorded at the Cocoanut Grove nightclub at the Ambassador Hotel in Los Angeles.

The album preceded Garland's famous run and landmark recording at Carnegie Hall by three years. The Cocoanut Grove show featured Garland with Freddy Martin's Orchestra, rather than others like Nelson Riddle or Billy May.

In 2008, the album was remastered and released in the compact disc format by DRG Records, the release included 13 "live" selected performances, three of which did not appear on the original LP.

== Critical reception ==
Professional ratings
Review scores
| Source | Rating |
|---|---|
| AllMusic | 4/5 stars |

Billboard commended the album, emphasizing its "exceptional" vocal performance, a "striking" cover photo, and "excellent" sound quality. They also noted the "terrific gag reading" of "Purple People Eater". Cash Box stated that the LP "displays Miss Garland at her best – when she's performing in front of a live, appreciative audience", adding that "the singer stirs up lots of memories and excitement" and called it "a delectable deck" likely to "stir up lots of sales".

In a retrospective review, William Ruhlmann of AllMusic noted that the album "demonstrat[es] to people unable to make it to venues like the Palladium what all the fuss was about" and emphasized that Garland is "clearly a powerful performer with a strong connection to her listeners," even without the visual complement and despite occasional signs of laryngitis. Frank Behrens of Brattleboro Reformer praised Garland as the greatest American female singer and described the album as a treasured addition to her legacy. Playbill wrote that although the repertoire was "very similar" to that of Judy at Carnegie Hall, "the intimacy of its setting" "sets this album apart", describing the recording as "particularly endearing" and writing that it "really makes you feel you're there".

== Track listing ==
Garland at the Grove
| No. | Title | Writer(s) | Length |
|---|---|---|---|
| 1. | "Garland Overture: "The Trolley Song" / "Over the Rainbow" / "The Man That Got Away"" | Ralph Blane, Hugh Martin / Harold Arlen, Yip Harburg / Arlen, Ira Gershwin | 3:39 |
| 2. | "When You're Smiling (The Whole World Smiles with You)" | Mark Fisher, Joe Goodwin, Larry Shay | 3:19 |
| 3. | "Day In, Day Out" | Rube Bloom, Johnny Mercer | 3:11 |
| 4. | "I Can't Give You Anything But Love" | Dorothy Fields, Jimmy McHugh | 5:02 |
| 5. | "Zing! Went the Strings of My Heart" | James F. Hanley | 4:10 |
| 6. | "Purple People Eater" | Sheb Wooley | 3:39 |
| 7. | "Medley: "You Made Me Love You" / "For Me and My Gal" / "The Trolley Song"" | Joseph McCarthy, James V. Monaco, Roger Edens / George W. Meyer, Edgar Leslie, E. Ray Goetz | 5:21 |
| 8. | "Do It Again" | George Gershwin, Buddy DeSylva | 3:47 |
| 9. | "When the Sun Comes Out" | Harold Arlen, Ted Koehler | 3:11 |
| 10. | "Rock-A-Bye Your Baby with a Dixie Melody" | Sam M. Lewis, Fred Schwartz, Joe Young | 2:51 |
| 11. | "Over the Rainbow" | Arlen, Yip Harburg | 5:01 |
| 12. | "After You've Gone" | Henry Creamer, Turner Layton | 2:31 |
| 13. | "A Pretty Girl Milking Her Cow" | Roger Edens, Traditional | 2:41 |
| 14. | "Swanee" | Irving Caesar, G. Gershwin | 2:49 |

== Personnel ==
- Judy Garland – vocals
- Freddy Martin and his Orchestra
- Freddy Martin – arranger, conductor
