= West Side Story (Cal Tjader album) =

Studio album by Cal Tjader
- Released: January 1, 1961
- Recorded: October 18, 1960
- Genre: Jazz
- Label: Fantasy; 3310 (mono) / 8054 (stereo)

Cal Tjader chronology
Demasiado Caliente (1960)	West Side Story (1961)	Live and Direct (1961)

Professional ratings
Review scores
Source	Rating
Allmusic	2.5/5 stars
Billboard	4/5 stars
The Christian Science Monitor	favorable
High Fidelity	favorable
The Washington Post	favorable
The Rolling Stone Jazz Record Guide	2/5 stars

West Side Story is an album featuring American vibraphonist Cal Tjader, consisting of musical numbers from Leonard Bernstein's West Side Story in jazz arrangements, by Tjader's pianist and musical director Clare Fischer, without vocals. It was recorded in October 1960 and released on the Fantasy label in January 1961 as Fantasy 3310 / 8054 (reissued on LP in 1968, in stereo only, as Fantasy 8379). On July 30, 2002, Fantasy would reissue it – along with the 1962 LP Cal Tjader Plays Harold Arlen – on CD as Cal Tjader Plays Harold Arlen and West Side Story.

Notwithstanding their respective billing, West Side Story devotes relatively little space to Tjader's – or any – improvisation, and thus remains notable, more as an early showcase for Fischer's arranging and orchestral prowess, and as the first recorded document of the pair's longstanding association. (Note: Or, more accurately, the first such document made public. While it's clear the Harold Arlen LP (3330 / 8072) was not released until January 1962, if the 2002 CD reissue notes can be believed, it was actually recorded in June 1960, well before WSS. Fischer himself did not play on the date; his participation was confined to arranging the five orchestral tracks which comprised the LP's second side.)

== Reception ==
In January 1961, having approached this West Side Story adaptation with few expectations, High Fidelity's reviewer was pleasantly surprised:

Just when it seemed that the idea of doing jazz versions of Broadway scores had been proven pointless, along come Tjader and arranger Clare Fischer with a brilliantly apt treatment of "West Side Story."

Billboard concurred, citing Fischer's work in particular:

A highly polished and feelingful musical interpretation of "West Side Story" is the latest LP by Cal Tjader. The music has been specially arranged by Clare Fischer and his work is particularly in tune with the original.

Reviewing the album's first single, "Maria," Billboard was even more effusive, especially regarding the writing: "An intriguing arrangement... with strings and vibes featured. Delightful harmonies are introduced here." Billboard's B-side assessment (of the uptempo, non-orchestral rendition of "Cool") was likewise framed primarily in terms of Fischer's involvement: "... this time, much more in a driving framework. Another good arrangement." The Washington Post's Tony Gieske also focused on Fischer's contribution, and in somewhat greater detail: (Note: Gieske also singles out Fischer's groundbreaking work on A Portrait of Duke Eliington and, in somewhat greater detail, Fischer's five tracks on Cal Tjader Plays Harold Arlen.)

"And on a remarkable new album, arranger Clare Fischer does at least three things that I wish Ramin and Robert Russell Bennett would listen to. First, he makes a nice little combo of tuba, French horn, flute and trombone, adding fresh colors to a Bernstein score which is itself one of the few which seems to attend in the least to how the orchestra sounds. Second, he makes the fiddles cool it with that fruity vibrato, opening them up so they sound like a few violins instead of a bad imitation of a lot of violins.

And in the third, he has a real rhythm section – Shelly Manne, Red Mitchell, Mongo and himself – instead of two bored automatons.

== Track listing ==
All compositions by Leonard Bernstein and Stephen Sondheim, except as indicated.

1. "Prologue" (Leonard Bernstein) / "The Jet Song" – 7:42
2. "Something's Coming" – 5:04
3. "Maria Interlude" – 1:28
4. "Maria" – 2:48
5. "Tonight" – 2:08
6. "America" – 3:59
7. "Cool" – 3:51
8. "One Hand, One Heart" – 1:50
9. "I Feel Pretty" / "Somewhere" – 6:39

== Personnel ==
- Cal Tjader – vibraphone
- Clare Fischer – piano, celeste
- Lonnie Hewitt – piano
- George Roberts – trombone (tracks 1, 2, 6)
- Red Callender – tuba (tracks 1, 2, 6)
- Vincent D'Rosa, James Decker, Richard Perissi – French horns (tracks 1, 2, 6)
- Paul Horn – flute (tracks 1, 2, 6)
- Gerald Vinci, Marshall Sosson, Herman Clebanoff, Amerigo Merino, Leonard Malarsky, Robert Barene, Jack L. Pepper, Henry Sugar, Alvin Dinkin – violins (tracks 1, 3, 4, 8, 9)
- Virginia Majewski – viola (tracks 1, 3, 4, 8, 9)
- Victor Gottlieb – cello (tracks 1, 3, 4, 8, 9)
- Carol Gotthoffer – harp (tracks 1, 3, 4, 8, 9)
- Red Mitchell, Victor Venegas – bass
- Shelly Manne, Milt Holland – drums
- Mongo Santamaria – conga
- Willie Bobo – drums, timbales
