= Anya Taranda =

American actress (1915–1970)

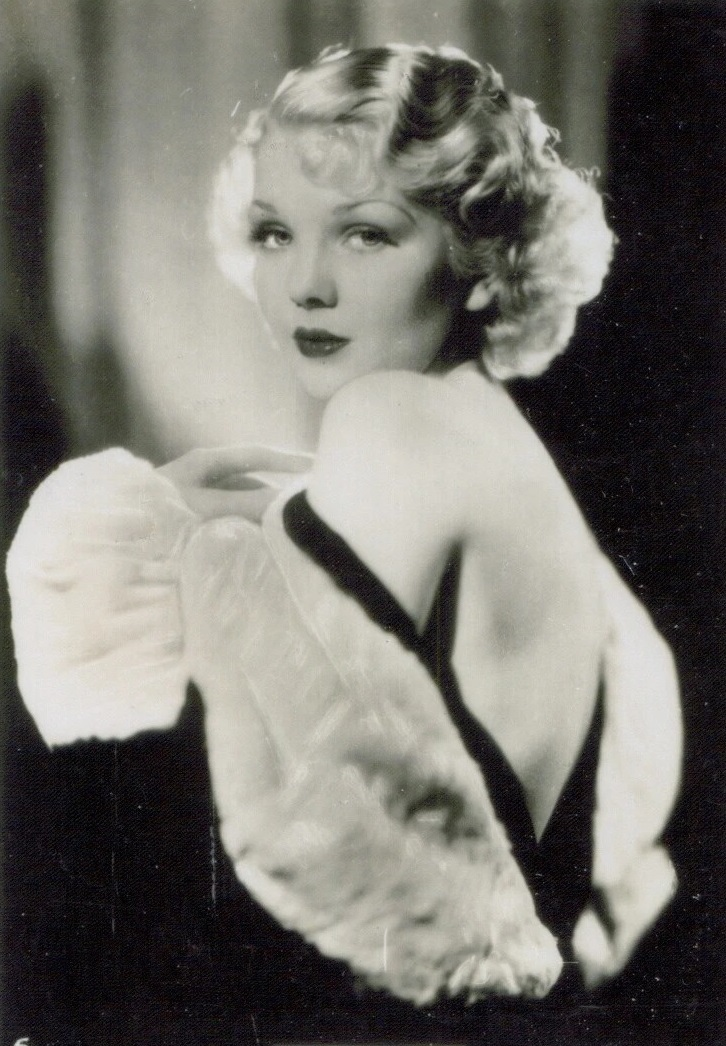
- Taranda in 1938
- Born: January 1, 1915; New York City, U.S.
- Died: March 9, 1970 (aged 55); New York City, U.S.
- Spouse: Harold Arlen (m. 1937)

Anya Taranda (January 1, 1915 – March 9, 1970) was an American model, showgirl, and actress and the wife of composer Harold Arlen.

== Biography ==
Born in New York City to Catholic Russian parents, Anya Taranda became a Powers Agency model where she was signed as one of the first Breck Shampoo models. In 1932, she met composer Harold Arlen in New York City during the Broadway theatre production of Earl Carroll's Vanities. They eventually married on January 6, 1937, over the objection of their parents, because she was a gentile and he was Jewish.

In 1934, she appeared in her first of nine film roles, in an uncredited part as an "Earl Carroll girl" in Murder at the Vanities, based on Carroll's Broadway play.

In 1951, she was institutionalized in a sanatorium after repeatedly threatening her husband and others with physical harm; she stayed there for seven years.

She died from a brain tumor on March 9, 1970, in New York City, at the age of 55. A Russian Orthodox service was held for her funeral. She is interred next to her husband in the Ferncliff Cemetery in Hartsdale, New York.

== Sources ==
- Jablonski, Edward (1996). Harold Arlen: Rhythm, Rainbows, and Blues. Northeastern University Press. ISBN 978-1-55553-366-3.
