= Edward Jablonski =

American historian (1922–2004)

- Born: March 1, 1922; Bay City, Michigan, U.S.
- Died: February 10, 2004 (aged 81)
- Education: Pre-Journalism
- Alma mater: New School for Social Research (BA) '50
- Occupation: Writer
- Writing career
- Notable awards: Silver Star (while serving in the United States Army Field Artillery)

Edward Jablonski (March 1, 1922 – February 10, 2004) was the author of several biographies on American cultural personalities, such as George Gershwin, Harold Arlen, Alan Jay Lerner, and Irving Berlin, as well as books on aviation history.

== Early life ==
Jablonski was born in Bay City, Michigan, to a family of Polish-American journalists and writers. His father had been a writer for Sztandar Polski and another relative, Paul F. Jablonski, wrote for The Bay City Times. Early on he fell in love with the music of George and Ira Gershwin. A fan letter he wrote to Ira while in school quickly turned into regular correspondence and eventually a lasting friendship with the lyricist.

While Jablonski was interested in music, his true fascination was with aviation. Supposedly, he spent much of his time watching the planes at the James Clements Airport near the South End of Bay City. Later on in his life, he became interested in aerial warfare. Telling an interviewer in 1986, "Aviation makes possible the most deadly form of warfare ever -- the perversion of one of man's greatest inventions."

== Military and writing career ==
He served in the United States Army Field Artillery in New Guinea during World War II. For his actions in New Guinea, he was awarded the Silver Star.

After leaving the army, he attended junior college in Bay City as a pre-journalism major. He continued his studies at the New School for Social Research, receiving his bachelor's in 1950. He also completed postgraduate work in anthropology at Columbia.

In 1949, Jablonski and Peter Bártok co-founded Walden Records. The company was a short-lived recording studio in New York City that specialized in American pop music.

While working for the March of Dimes charity in New York, Jablonski wrote articles and music reviews for a number of small magazines as well as liner notes for albums; this was the beginning of a fifty-year freelance career.

At the time of his death, he was working on Masters of American Song, which would have been a comprehensive history of American pop music.

== Works ==
- The Great War. Whitman. 1965. OCLC 3679824.
- Ladybirds: Women in Aviation. Hawthorn. 1968.
- Flying Fortress. Doubleday. 1968. (1968 ISBN 978-0-385-03855-3)
- Warrior With Wings. Bobbs-Merrill. 1968.
- Seawings. Doubleday. 1972. ISBN 9780385069465.
- Airwar. Doubleday. 1971. (1979 ISBN 978-0-385-14279-3 OCLC 4632967)
- The Gershwin Years. Doubleday. 1973. ISBN 9780385028479.
- Double Strike; the Epic Air Raids on Regensburg-Schweinfurt, August 17, 1943. Doubleday. 1974. ISBN 0385075405. OCLC 866038.
- Lowell, Thomas; Jablonski, Edward (1976). Doolittle: a Biography. Doubleday. Reprinted by DaCapo press in 1982. ISBN 0-306-80158-2 OCLC 8133060
- The Encyclopedia of American Music. Doubleday. 1981. ISBN 9780385080880.
- A Pictorial History of the Middle East. Doubleday. 1984.
- A Pictorial History of World War II. Doubleday. 1977. ISBN 978-0-385-12350-1. (1985 paperback ISBN 978-0-385-18553-0, 1996 ISBN 978-0-517-12208-2)
- Gershwin. Doubleday. 1987. ISBN 978-0-385-19431-0. (paperback ISBN 978-0-306-80847-0)
- Alan Jay Lerner: A Biography. Henry Holt and Co. 1996. ISBN 9780805040760. ISBN 0-8050-4076-5
- Harold Arlen. Northeastern University Press. 1996. ISBN 1-55553-263-2
- Irving Berlin: American Troubadour. Henry Holt and Co. 1999. ISBN 978-0-8050-4077-7.

== Legacy ==
His book collection is held by the Pritzker Military Museum & Library in Chicago, Illinois.
