= Maggie May (musical) =

- Original theatre programme and poster
- Music: Lionel Bart
- Lyrics: Lionel Bart
- Book: Alun Owen
- Basis: sea shanty Maggie May
- Productions: 1964
- Awards: Novello Award

Maggie May is a musical with a book by Alun Owen and music and lyrics by Lionel Bart. Based on "Maggie May", a traditional ballad about a Liverpool prostitute, it deals with trade union ethics and disputes among Irish-Catholic dockers in Liverpool, centring on the life of streetwalker Margaret Mary Duffy and her sweetheart, a freewheeling sailor.

The show includes bittersweet ballads, robust chorus numbers, and even some rock 'n' roll, making it one of the most musically diverse British scores of the 1960s. Steven Suskin, in reviewing a newly released CD, wrote: the show begins with a "rather weird folk-ballad", and has "a couple of gentle lullaby-like ballads...raucous production numbers... a tongue-twister, set to an almost violent waltz", along with a distinctive version of the title song "which mixes a sailor's chanty with — what, Dixieland?".

== History ==
The West End production opened on 22 September 1964 at London's Adelphi Theatre, where it ran for 501 performances. The cast included Rachel Roberts, Kenneth Haigh, Andrew Keir, Barry Humphries, John Junkin, and Geoffrey Hughes. Georgia Brown later replaced Roberts in the title role; Brown was subsequently replaced by Judith Bruce.

Maggie May won the Novello Award for outstanding score of the year and the Critics' Poll as Best New British Musical.

The musical has had subsequent productions, most notably by National Youth Theatre in 1992 and at the Finborough Theatre in 2019.

== Synopsis ==
=== Act I ===
Patrick Casey is a young sailor from a Catholic Liverpool-Irish family. His father was a famous trades union leader, who was killed during a strike. Patrick rejects his father's advice in order to live a life of exploration and adventure as an ocean going seaman. Back in Liverpool, his childhood sweetheart, Margaret Duffy, has become a popular dockland prostitute known as Maggie May. All the sailors are devoted to her because of her generous nature; however she is still in love with Patrick, and calls all her clients "Casey".

Patrick returns to Liverpool to work on the docks, and is greeted by the other dock workers. He tells a tale about his visit to an African country, where he was expected to participate in a militia to put down demonstrations by exploited African workers, but refused. The other dockers see him as a potential leader in their struggles, but he refuses to become involved and attempts to revive his relationship with Maggie.

=== Act II ===
As Maggie starts to hope for a new life with Patrick, she discovers he has been drawn into plans for a dock strike, leading to an argument between them. To get back at Patrick, Maggie becomes involved with Willie Morgan, a corrupt local deal-maker. Patrick discovers that a shipment at the docks comprises weapons for police in apartheid South Africa. He and other workers decide to sabotage the weapons. Maggie breaks with Willie, and she and Patrick commit to each other. The sabotage plan is betrayed and Patrick is killed in a fight over the weapons. Maggie is left devastated and with no option but to continue working as a prostitute.

== Song list ==
- Overture/The Ballad Of The "Liver" Bird
- Lullaby/I Love A Man
- Casey
- Shine You Swine
- Day Don't Do Dat T’Day
- I Told You So
- Right Of Way
- Stroll On
- Away from Home
- Maggie, Maggie May
- D'Land of Promises
- Carrying On
- Union Cha-Cha
- It's Yourself
- The World's a Lovely Place
- I'm Me
- (We Don't All Wear) D’Same Size Boots
- It's Yourself (Reprise)
- Finale/The Ballad of the 'Liver' Bird (Reprise)

== Judy Garland EP ==
"Maggie, Maggie May", "The Land of Promises", "It's Yourself" and "There's Only One Union" were later recorded by American singer, Judy Garland. Garland was friends with Lionel Bart, who was also rumored to be Judy's manager at the time. The songs were recorded in London by George Martin and released on the Capitol Records Label in September 1964 as an EP. Garland subsequently recorded several of the songs again while performing with her daughter, Liza Minnelli at the London Palladium in November, 1964. In 2002, the songs were released in Garland album Classic Judy Garland – The Capitol Years: 1955–1965.

Shirley Bassey released "It's Yourself" as her penultimate Columbia single in 1965.
