= A Portrait of Duke Ellington =

Studio album by Dizzy Gillespie
- Released: 1960
- Recorded: April 27 & 28, 1960
- Studio: NYC
- Genre: Jazz
- Length: 41:38
- Label: Verve; MG V-8386

Dizzy Gillespie chronology
Have Trumpet, Will Excite! (1959)	A Portrait of Duke Ellington (1960)	Gillespiana (1960)

A Portrait of Duke Ellington is a 1960 album featuring trumpeter Dizzy Gillespie and orchestra performing compositions associated with Duke Ellington, recorded in 1960 and released on the Verve label.

== Recording and release history ==
All of the orchestral arrangements were provided by then Hi-Lo's accompanist – and sometimes arranger – Clare Fischer, hired on the basis of a previously recorded but unreleased album with strings, arranged by Fischer for erstwhile University of Michigan classmate Donald Byrd. Byrd played the tape for Gillespie; Gillespie liked what he heard. Unfortunately for Fischer, especially in light of the critical accolades given the eventual fruit of his, and Gillespie's, labor, Fischer's name was nowhere to be found on the finished LP; widespread awareness of his participation would have to await the CD reissue almost 2½ decades later.

== Reception ==
Professional ratings
Review scores
Source	Rating
AllMusic	4.5/5 stars
Billboard	5/5 stars
The Rolling Stone Album Guide	3/5 stars
Stereo Review	favorable
The Washington Post	favorable

The AllMusic review awarded the album 4.5 stars.

The album's original LP release received 5 stars from Billboard, though, owing to Verve's aforementioned oversight, Fischer's contribution went unnoticed. In fact, it was only through the efforts of The Washington Post's Tony Gieske that this, as well as two of Fischer's other groundbreaking efforts in this period, were acknowledged and documented. (Note: Gieske also wrote tellingly regarding one and a half orchestral LPs arranged by Fischer for Cal Tjader, West Side Story and Cal Tjader Plays Harold Arlen.) Regarding the Gillespie LP, Gieske noted:

And on A Portrait of Duke Ellington (Verve MG V 8386), that depth and skill, stimulated by a change in the stale Gillespie repertoire and complemented by rich, radically imaginative arrangements by, I am told, Clare Fischer, result in a really classic album. Fischer, a young conservatory graduate, is a new name to be reckoned with.

== Track listing ==
All compositions by Duke Ellington except as indicated

=== Side A ===
1. "In a Mellow Tone" – 3:47
2. "Things Ain't What They Used to Be" (Mercer Ellington) – 4:54
3. "Serenade to Sweden" – 4:24
4. "Chelsea Bridge" (Billy Strayhorn) – 2:36
5. "Upper Manhattan Medical Group" (Strayhorn) – 3:06
6. "Do Nothin' Till You Hear from Me" – 2:40

=== Side B ===
1. "Caravan" (Juan Tizol, Ellington) – 5:23
2. "Sophisticated Lady" – 3:21
3. "Johnny Come Lately" – 3:38
4. "Perdido" (Tizol) – 4:51
5. "Come Sunday" – 2:58

== Personnel ==
- Dizzy Gillespie – trumpet
- Bennie Green – trombone
- Ray Alonge, Richard Berg, Joe Singer – French horn
- Jay McAllister – tuba
- Robert DiDomenica – flute
- Ernest Bright, John Murtaugh, Paul Richie, Stan Webb – woodwinds
- George Devens – vibraphone
- Hank Jones – piano, celesta
- George Duvivier – bass
- Charlie Persip – drums
- Clare Fischer – arranger, director
