= I Happen to Like New York =

1930 song by Cole Porter

"I Happen to Like New York" is a popular song written by Cole Porter for the 1930 musical The New Yorkers when it was introduced by Oscar Ragland.

The song has become a standard of the Great American Songbook, with recordings by many different artists. British-born singer Dorothy Carless closes her album Mixed Emotions (1956) with the song. Judy Garland recorded the song for her 1962 album The Garland Touch, Caterina Valente recorded the song as the title track of her 1964 album. A 1973 recording by Bobby Short from the album Live at the Café Carlyle was used in the 1993 film Manhattan Murder Mystery. The song opens the 1987 Liza Minnelli live album At Carnegie Hall. Actress Jean Smart sang a modified version of the song with different lyrics on the 50th season premiere of Saturday Night Live in September 2024.

== See also ==
- List of 1930s jazz standards
- List of songs about New York City
