= Miss Show Business =

Studio album by Judy Garland
- Released: September 26, 1955
- Recorded: August 25–September 2, 1955
- Studio: Capitol Tower (Los Angeles, CA)
- Genre: Traditional Pop
- Label: Capitol

Judy Garland chronology
A Star Is Born (1954)	Miss Show Business (1955)	Judy (1956)

Miss Show Business is a studio album by Judy Garland. It was released on September 26, 1955, by Capitol Records. The album's arrangements were crafted by Hal Mooney and Roger Edens, with Jack Cathcart serving as the conductor. The cover photography was handled by Sanford Roth.

Billboard praised the album, highlighting its selection of iconic songs associated with Miss Garland, including some from her renowned New York Palace Theater performance. The review emphasized the album's early success, noting its strong sales potential and urging retailers who missed the initial release to restock it promptly. The album peaked at #5 on the Billboard 200.

== Track listing ==
Side one
No.	Title	Writer(s)	Recording date	Length
1.	"This Is the Time of the Evening / While We're Young"	Roger Edens; Leonar Gershe	August 29, 1955	4:46
2.	"Medley: You Made Me Love You (I Didn't Want to Do It) / For Me and My Gal / The Boy Next Door / The Trolley Song"	James V. Monaco; Joseph McCarthy; George W. Meyer; Edgar Leslie; E. Ray Goetz; Hugh Martin; Ralph Blane	August 29, 1955	6:17
3.	"A Pretty Girl Milking Her Cow"	Traditional; arr. by Edens	August 25, 1955	3:03
4.	"Rock-a-Bye Your Baby with a Dixie Melody"	Jean Schwartz; Sam M. Lewis; Joe Young	August 25, 1955	2:39
5.	"Happiness Is a Thing Called Joe"	Harold Arlen; E.Y. "Yip" Harburg	September 1, 1955	4:24

Side two
No.	Title	Writer(s)	Recording date	Length
1.	"Judy at the Palace / Shine on Harvest Moon / Some of These Days / My Man / I Don't Care"	Edens; Nora Bayes; Jack Norworth; Shelton Brooks; Maurice Yvain; Channing Pollock; Harry O. Sutton; Jean Lenox	August 29, 1955	6:08
2.	"Carolina in the Morning"	Walter Donaldson; Gus Kahn	August 29, 1955	3:04
3.	"Danny Boy"	Fred E. Weatherly	September 1–2, 1955	3:07
4.	"After You've Gone"	Henry Creamer; Turner Layton	August 25, 1955	2:15
5.	"Over the Rainbow"	Arlen; Harburg	August 25, 1955	3:31
