= Bob Norberg (engineer) =

Bob Norberg was an American recording engineer for Capitol Records, known for his work mixing or re-mastering recordings by many popular and classical artists, including Merle Haggard, Les Paul, Nat King Cole, Frank Sinatra, the Beach Boys, Itzhak Perlman, and many others.

Born and raised in East Aurora, New York, his father owned a wallpaper and paint store and also served as a part-time Baptist minister. An early interest in sound was sparked by a Victrola in his grandmother's home in Buffalo. Norberg graduated from East Aurora High School in 1954 and studied at Houghton College with the intention of entering the ministry, but became heavily involved in the campus radio station. He left Aurora in 1966 to pursue his career in sound engineering, and after working briefly in radio in Buffalo, New York, he sought opportunities elsewhere. In 1966 he was hired by a Hollywood, California, recording studio. He joined Capitol Records as an assistant engineer in 1967. He worked at Capitol Studios in Hollywood; his first session with was Merle Haggard, and he later worked on projects with the Beach Boys during the late 1960s.

At Capitol, Norberg also recorded classical sessions with ensembles such as the Los Angeles Chamber Orchestra and handled remote recordings of the Cleveland Orchestra, Philadelphia Orchestra, Pittsburgh Symphony, Utah Symphony, and Chicago Symphony Orchestra for Capitol's Angel Records label.

In 1984, he worked with Soundstage Electro-Acoustics to design the Norberg BCS-16 nearfield studio monitors.

During the last 15 years of his career, Norberg shifted focus from recording to digital remastering, using Capitol's preserved original tapes. His remastering work included albums by Nat King Cole and Frank Sinatra.
