= Just for Openers =

Live album by Judy Garland
- Released: March 30, 1964
- Genre: Traditional pop; standards; show tunes
- Length: 34:00 (Sources vary regarding the equivalent duration in seconds)
- Label: Capitol Records
- Producer: Kermit Walter

Just for Openers is the third live album by Judy Garland, released on April 6, 1964, by Capitol Records. It features selections from her television series, The Judy Garland Show (1963–64), presenting a mix of standards, show tunes, and traditional pop, including "Fly Me to the Moon" and "Battle Hymn of the Republic". The original release offered both mono and simulated stereo versions to suit different playback systems of the time.

The album received generally positive reviews, with critics praising Garland's vocal performance and stage presence. Commercially, it peaked at #97 on the Music Business Pop LPs chart.

== Album details and release ==
The album compiles selections from Judy Garland performances on The Judy Garland Show, her television series that aired during 1963–64. It marks the only official release of material from the show at the time, with Garland performing a mixture of standards, show tunes, and traditional pop, such as "Fly Me to the Moon" and "Battle Hymn of the Republic". The original release included both mono and a simulated stereo version (Capitol's "Duophonic" process) to appeal to various playback systems popular at the time.

The album's producer, Kermit Walter, arranged for a selection of songs that highlighted Garland's vocal versatility and stage presence, despite her show being canceled after one season. While the album was popular among her fans, it remained out of print for years. Later releases, including an abridged 1980 version and other compilations, have since made more of her TV recordings available in higher fidelity.

Over the years, recordings from The Judy Garland Show have appeared on various unofficial or "bootleg" albums and CDs, some reportedly produced by Garland's ex-husband, Sid Luft. These bootleg releases often suffered from low audio quality or were heavily altered with electronic enhancements. Capitol Records did not release any official compilation of songs from the series until 1989, when selected tracks were included on the CD Judy Garland Live! In 2001, a more comprehensive collection of recordings from The Judy Garland Show was issued under the title The Show That Got Away, offering fans higher-quality versions of songs from the show.

== Critical reception ==
The Billboard review expresses a positive opinion about the album. It mentions that although her CBS-TV show was canceled after one season, the album delivers enough audio excitement to be a strong seller. It also highlights that Judy is in top vocal form and questions why her show didn't succeed. The Cashbox review praises the album, describing it as a collection of "vocal beauties" and highlighting Garland's "distinctive brand of vocal artistry" applied to both old and new favorites such as "It's A Good Day", "More", "As Long As He Needs Me", and "I Wish You Love".

== Commercial performance ==
The album debuted at #100 on the Music Business Pop LPs chart in the Action Albums section, and the following week it rose to #97, which was both its peak position and its final appearance on the chart.

== Track listing ==
Track listing
| No. | Title | Writer(s) | Recording date |
|---|---|---|---|
| 1 | "It's a Good Day" | Peggy Lee, Dave Barbour | November 8, 1963 |
| 2 | "That's All" | Alan Brandt, Bob Haymes | October 11, 1963 |
| 3 | "Some People" | Jule Styne, Stephen Sondheim | October 11, 1963 |
| 4 | "More" | Andrea Morricone, Riz Ortolani, Norman Newell | November 30, 1963 |
| 5 | "Island in the West Indies" | Harold Arlen, Leo Robin | October 18, 1963 |
| 6 | "As Long as He Needs Me" | Lionel Bart | July 16, 1963 |
| 7 | "Get Me to the Church on Time" | Frederick Loewe, Alan Jay Lerner | November 30, 1963 |
| 8 | "Fly Me to the Moon (In Other Words)" | Bart Howard | September 20, 1963 |
| 9 | "I Wish You Love" | Charles Trenet, Albert Beach | September 27, 1963 |
| 10 | "Jamboree Jones" | Vernon Duke, John Latouche | November 30, 1963 |
| 11 | "The Battle Hymn of the Republic" | Traditional, arranged by Mort Lindsey | December 13, 1963 |
| 12 | "Maybe I'll Come Back" | Charles Strouse, Lee Adams | July 30, 1963 |

== Charts ==
1964 weekly chart performance
| Chart (1964) | Peak position |
|---|---|
| US Pop LP's - Action Albums (Music Business) | 97 |
