= That's Entertainment! (song) =

1952 song by Arthur Schwartz and Howard Dietz

Song
- Published: 1952
- Genre: Traditional pop
- Composer: Arthur Schwartz
- Lyricist: Howard Dietz

"That's Entertainment!" is a popular song with music written by Arthur Schwartz and lyrics by Howard Dietz. The song was published in 1952 and was written especially for the 1953 Metro-Goldwyn-Mayer musical film The Band Wagon. It was orchestrated for the film by Conrad Salinger under the musical direction of Adolph Deutsch. The song is performed in the film by Jack Buchanan supported by Fred Astaire, Nanette Fabray, and Oscar Levant.

In 2004, the song finished at number 45 in AFI's 100 Years...100 Songs survey of top tunes in American cinema.

== Association with MGM ==
The song has become nearly synonymous with Metro-Goldwyn-Mayer. The studio used the tune for its 1955-56 television series MGM Parade which featured clips from past and forthcoming MGM films.

In 1974, MGM released their retrospective film series with the same name, which featured clips from the studio's golden age. Its success spawned two sequels, both of which feature the song. In That's Entertainment, Part II, some new lyrics were added to the song and performed by hosts Gene Kelly and Astaire. The film credited those lyrics to Dietz and Saul Chaplin, one of the film's producers, though Chaplin was known as a composer, not a lyricist.

The studio also used a remix of Judy Garland's recording of the song to underscore the trailer for the January 15, 2023 launch of the network and streaming platform MGM+, following the network's rebrand from Epix. The 1974 film was also added to the network's streaming platform the same day as the rebrand's launch.

== Performances ==
The song is perhaps most associated with Judy Garland, who recorded it for her 1960 LP That's Entertainment!, using a shortened version of the original Salinger arrangement. A year later, a live version appeared on Garland's Grammy-winning double album Judy at Carnegie Hall. She also performed it on The Judy Garland Show where she dances around the TV stage during an orchestral interlude.

In 1979, the song was sung with parody lyrics by the villain Mordru in the television special Legends of the Superheroes. In the 1980s, the song was performed, again with new lyrics, by Larry Santos in a commercial for TV Guide magazine.

Joaquin Phoenix and Lady Gaga performed the song in the American jukebox musical thriller film Joker: Folie à Deux (2024). Lady Gaga released a solo cover version of the song on Harlequin (2024), her companion album to the film.
