= Last Night When We Were Young =

"Last Night When We Were Young" is a 1935 popular song about nostalgia for a fleeting love composed by Harold Arlen, with lyrics by Yip Harburg. Arlen regarded it as a favourite of the songs that he had written.

Lawrence Tibbett recorded the song on October 9, 1935. It was cut from his film Metropolitan but performed instrumentally behind the credits.

"Last Night When We Were Young" was highly regarded by Judy Garland, who recorded it twice, and frequently performed it. Composer Alec Wilder called it a "most remarkable and beautiful song" that "goes far beyond the boundaries of popular music." Continuing, he stated that "[i]t is unlike any other Arlen song that I have heard. However, it is unmistakably his." Harburg did not know where he acquired the title, saying, "the juxtaposition of those two phrases is almost a whole world of philosophy". Singer Tony Bennett, aged 95, gave an "emotional" performance of the song at his final concerts, in 2021.

== Notable recordings ==
- Frank Sinatra - In the Wee Small Hours (1955), September of My Years (1965)
- Carmen McRae - Torchy (1955)
- The Hi-Lo's - On Hand (1956).
- Peggy Lee - Dream Street (1956)
- Judy Garland - Judy (1956)
- Art Farmer - Last Night When We Were Young (1958)
- Tony Bennett - To My Wonderful One (1960), Perfectly Frank (1992)
- Cal Tjader (arr. Clare Fischer) - Cal Tjader Plays Harold Arlen (recorded 1960, released 1962; reissued 2002 on CD as Cal Tjader Plays Harold Arlen and West Side Story)
- Sarah Vaughan - Close to You (1960)
- Vic Damone- Young and Lively (1962).
- Mel Tormé and George Shearing - An Elegant Evening (1985)
- Carly Simon - Film Noir (1997)
- Keith Jarrett Trio - Tokyo '96 (released 1998)
- Karin Krog / Jacob Young - Where Flamingos Fly (2002)
- Franck Amsallem - Gotham Goodbye (2019)
