= Day In, Day Out (1939 song) =

1939 song by Rube Bloom and Johnny Mercer

"Day In, Day Out" is a popular song with music by Rube Bloom and lyrics by Johnny Mercer and published in 1939.

== Background ==
According to Alec Wilder the song, 56 measures long, has a wonderful, soaring melodic line, free from pretentiousness, but full of passion and intensity which is superbly supported by the lyrics. Although the catch phrase "day in—day out" sounds like a dull routine, Mercer uses exotic images to contrast with the boring sound of the phrase.

== Recordings ==
The song has been recorded by numerous artists.

- Helen Forrest with Artie Shaw and his Orchestra – Bluebird Records 78 rpm single (1939)
- Helen Ward with Bob Crosby and his Orchestra (1939) – a #1 hit on the Billboard charts.
- Horace Silver – Horace Silver Trio (1953)
- Frank Sinatra – The Point of No Return (Expanded Edition 2002 – Song recorded April 4, 1953), Come Dance with Me! (1959), Nice 'n' Easy (1960), Sinatra & Sextet: Live in Paris (1994)
- Margaret Whiting – Margaret Whiting Sings for the Starry Eyed (1956)
- Billie Holiday – Songs for Distingué Lovers (1957)
- Lena Horne with Nat Brandwynne's Orchestra – Lena Horne at the Waldorf Astoria (1957)
- Johnny Mathis – Wonderful, Wonderful (1957)
- Petula Clark – Petula Clark in Hollywood (1959)<
- Judy Garland – Judy in Love (1958) and Garland at the Grove (1959)
- The Four Freshmen and Stan Kenton – Road Show (1960)
- Carmen Cavallaro – Swingin' Easy (1962)
- Nat King Cole – Let's Face the Music! (1964)
- Ella Fitzgerald – Ella Fitzgerald Sings the Johnny Mercer Songbook (1964), Ella at Juan-Les-Pins (1964)
- Phyllis Marshall – That Girl (1964)
- The Peddlers – Birthday (1969)
- Diana Krall – From This Moment On (2006)
- Bob Dylan – Triplicate (2017)
