= Any Place I Hang My Hat Is Home =

"Any Place I Hang My Hat Is Home" is a popular song with music by Harold Arlen and lyrics by Johnny Mercer.

It was first introduced in 1946 in the musical St. Louis Woman. In the musical, the song is sung by a female character of easy virtue, played by Ruby Hill in the original cast, and the lyrics start out, "Free and easy". The score by Arlen provides a languid accompaniment, not dissimilar to that of "One for My Baby (and One More for the Road)", also by Arlen and Mercer.

== Barbra Streisand recording ==
Barbra Streisand recorded the song for The Second Barbra Streisand Album in 1963. The song appeared on the album twice: first, as the individual song to open the album; then to close the album as a medley with "Like a Straw in the Wind".

== Notable recordings ==
Many other vocalists have recorded the song including:

- Rosemary Clooney – Rosemary Clooney Sings the Lyrics of Johnny Mercer (1987)
- Sammy Davis, Jr. – That's All! (1967)
- Judy Garland – Judy (1956)
- Lena Horne – Stormy Weather (1957)
- Susannah McCorkle – The Quality of Mercer (1977)
- Johnny Mercer (who co-authored the song) – a single release in 1946 and a re-recording in 1974 for the album Johnny Mercer Singer-Songwriter.
- Dinah Shore – Dinah Down Home! (1962)
