= Lucky Day (1926 song) =

"Lucky Day" is a 1926 song by written by Buddy DeSylva, Lew Brown, and Ray Henderson for George White's Scandals of 1926, along with "The Birth of the Blues". The song was first performed in 1926 by Harry Richman and chorus. The song has been covered by many artists. Popular recordings in 1926 were by George Olsen and by The Revelers.

In the 1940s, the song was used as a theme for the NBC radio program Your Hit Parade, which was sponsored by Lucky Strike cigarettes. It was recorded in 1956 as a single for Judy Garland and included in her album Judy. She recorded the song again in 1960 and it was later released on the album The London Sessions in 1992. It was also recorded by Ruth Olay (for her album Olay! - The New Sound Of Ruth Olay 1958), Ronnie Hilton (for his album I'm Beginning to See the Light 1959) and by Petula Clark.
