= Alone (Judy Garland album) =

Studio album by Judy Garland
- Released: May 6, 1957
- Recorded: 1957
- Genre: Traditional pop
- Length: 32:18
- Label: Capitol
- Producer: Voyle Gilmore

Judy Garland chronology
Judy (1956)	Alone (1957)	Judy in Love (1958)

Alone is the seventh studio album by the American actress and singer Judy Garland. It was released on May 6, 1957, by Capitol Records. Arranged by Gordon Jenkins, Alone marks a departure from her usual repertoire of show tunes and movie songs, focusing instead on themes of loneliness.

== Critical reception ==
Professional ratings
Review scores
Source	Rating
Allmusic	3/5 stars
Billboard	86/100

According to Billboard, Jenkins provided an "excellent" orchestral support and Garland's voice has the emotional depth and dramatic appeal of her previous releases. The review highlighted the album's "attractive" cover design. Cash Box stated that the LP shows "perhaps even more distinction" than its predecessor, highlighted "what a marvelous display of inner feelings and wistfulness is portrayed" and praised its "great vocal performances", calling it "almost sure chart material".

Playbill wrote that Garland "spin rhapsodic renditions" of some standards in the LP and "gives them classic performances not to be missed".

== Commercial performance ==
In July 15, 1957 the album peaked at number two in the Billboard "Pop Albums Coming Up Strong" chart.

== Track listing ==
No.	Title	Writer(s)	Length
1.	"By Myself"	Howard Dietz, Arthur Schwartz	2:38
2.	"Little Girl Blue"	Lorenz Hart, Richard Rodgers	3:41
3.	"Me and My Shadow"	Dave Dreyer, Al Jolson, Billy Rose	3:43
4.	"Among My Souvenirs"	Edgar Leslie, Horatio Nicholls	3:06
5.	"I Gotta Right to Sing the Blues"	Harold Arlen, Ted Koehler	2:53
6.	"I Get the Blues When It Rains"	Bruce Klauber, Harry Stoddard	3:12
7.	"Mean to Me"	Fred E. Ahlert, Roy Turk	3:58
8.	"How About Me"	Irving Berlin	3:42
9.	"Just a Memory"	Lew Brown, Buddy DeSylva, Ray Henderson	2:28
10.	"Blue Prelude"	Joe Bishop, Gordon Jenkins	2:46
11.	"Happy New Year"	Jenkins	3:12
12.	"Then You've Never Been Blue" (studio outtake not included on the original 1957 release)	Ted Fio Rito, Sam M. Lewis, Frances Langford, Joe Young	2:11

== Personnel ==
- Judy Garland - vocals
- Gordon Jenkins - conductor, arranger
