= Judy (Judy Garland album) =

Studio album by Judy Garland
- Released: October 10, 1956
- Studios: Capitol Studios (Los Angeles, CA)
- Label: Capitol
- Producer: Nelson Riddle

Judy Garland chronology
Miss Show Business (1955)	Judy (1956)	Alone (1957)

Judy is a studio album by Judy Garland. It was released on October 10, 1956, by Capitol Records. The album was conducted and arranged by Nelson Riddle. The eleven tracks were selected to complement Garland's style, with the pacing set to create a pleasant mood and varied tempo.

When the album was released on CD in 1989, "I'm Old Fashioned" (Jerome Kern, Johnny Mercer) was added as a bonus track. The song title of track 8 was corrected to "Maybe I'll Come Back," credited to Charles L. Cooke and Howard C. Jeffrey.

In 2024, HDTT release The Alternate "Judy" Album that presents unreleased alternate takes from the 1956 album. Garland recorded these versions under challenging conditions due to a respiratory infection, affecting some of the takes' vocal quality, which were later replaced in the final release. The album's rare acetate recordings, owned by designer and collector Raphael Geroni, were remastered by John H. Haley of Harmony Restorations, LLC.

== Critical reception ==
Professional ratings
Review scores
Source	Rating
The Encyclopedia of Popular Music	3/5 stars
The Rolling Stone Album Guide	4/5 stars

Billboard praised the album's cover and predicted that, with Garland's ongoing stage and club success, the record would likely attract significant sales. CD Review praised Judy for its "excitement and vitality", noting Garland's ability to build songs to a "thrilling climax", particularly on "Last Night When We Were Young", also calling her performances of "Come Rain or Come Shine" and "Any Place I Hang My Hat Is Home" "wonderful".

== Commercial performance ==
In November 24, 1956 the album peaked at number 2 on the Billboard "Pop Albums Coming Up Strong" and number 9 in the monthly "Pop Vocals" albums chart.

== Track listing ==
Judy
No.	Title	Writer(s)	Length
1.	"Come Rain or Come Shine"	Harold Arlen, Johnny Mercer	3:44
2.	"Just Imagine"	Ray Henderson, Lew Brown, Buddy DeSylva	2:57
3.	"I Feel a Song Coming On"	Dorothy Fields, Jimmy McHugh, George Oppenheimer	2:11
4.	"Last Night When We Were Young"	Harold Arlen, Yip Harburg	3:29
5.	"Life Is Just a Bowl of Cherries"	Ray Henderson, Lew Brown	1:59
6.	"April Showers"	Louis Silvers, Buddy DeSylva	3:18
7.	"I'm Old Fashioned"	Jerome Kern, Johnny Mercer	3:24
8.	"Maybe I'll Come Back"	Charles C. Cook, Howard Jeffrey	2:21
9.	"Dirty Hands, Dirty Face"	James V. Monaco, Al Jolson, Grant Clarke, Edgar Leslie	4:48
10.	"Lucky Day"	Ray Henderson, Lew Brown, Buddy DeSylva	2:49
11.	"Memories of You"	Eubie Blake, Andy Razaf	3:38
12.	"Any Place I Hang My Hat Is Home"	Harold Arlen, Johnny Mercer	4:05

- "I'm Old Fashioned" is a studio outtakes not included on the original 1956 release.

== Personnel ==
=== Performance ===
- Judy Garland - vocals
- Nelson Riddle - conductor, arranger

=== LP design ===
- Bob Willoughby - photographs
