= Judy Garland Live! =

Live album by Judy Garland
- Released: June 20, 1989
- Recorded: 25 April 1962
- Genre: Showtunes
- Length: 46:47
- Label: Capitol

Judy Garland chronology
| Judy Garland at Home at the Palace: Opening Night (1967) | Judy Garland Live! (1989) | The Best of the Decca Years, Volume 1 – Hits! (1990) |

Judy Garland Live!, also known as Judy Takes Broadway, is the fourth live album by Judy Garland, released on June 20, 1989, by Capitol Records. The recording took place at the Manhattan Center in New York City on April 26, 1962. That evening, Garland was suffering from a severe case of laryngitis, which prevented her from completing the full set of 13 songs—she managed to finish only 10.

Initially, Capitol Records chose not to release the album due to the impact of Garland's illness on the performance, with tentative plans for her to re-record the material in a studio. However, the album was eventually issued 27 years later under the title Judy Garland Live!.

== Critical reception ==
Professional ratings
Review scores
| Source | Rating |
|---|---|
| AllMusic | 3/5 stars |
| The Encyclopedia of Popular Music | 3/5 stars |
| The Rolling Stone Album Guide | 4/5 stars |

The Rolling Stone Album Guide noted that studio executives had rejected the recordings because they considered Garland's voice "coarsened to the point of embarrassment", but said that the album "proves them half-way wrong", since although "Judy sounds strained at times", "the passion of her delivery" gives the songs "an even greater measure of pathos".

Playbill considered it an "essential" record, adding that: "Thankfully, she got through most of the show on the voice she did have and if it did not produce a hit record, the re-released tracks are still great Garland recordings of a host of showtunes that would become Judy standards".

== Track listing ==
Tracks 10–14 are from the Capitol Records album Just for Openers.

Judy Garland Live!
| No. | Title | Writer(s) | Length |
|---|---|---|---|
| 1. | "Sail Away" | Noël Coward | 4:14 |
| 2. | "Something's Coming" | Leonard Bernstein, Stephen Sondheim | 3:33 |
| 3. | "Just In Time" | Jule Styne, Betty Comden, Adolph Green | 3:46 |
| 4. | "Get Me to the Church on Time" | Frederick Loewe, Alan Jay Lerner | 2:44 |
| 5. | "Never Will I Marry" | Frank Loesser | 2:33 |
| 6. | "Joey, Joey, Joey" | Frank Loesser | 3:12 |
| 7. | "Hey, Look Me Over" | Cy Coleman, Carolyn Leigh | 2:40 |
| 8. | "Some People" | Jule Styne, Stephen Sondheim | 2:34 |
| 9. | "The Party's Over" | Jule Styne, Betty Comden, Adolph Green | 4:10 |
| 10. | "It's a Good Day" | Dave Barbour, Peggy Lee | 2:12 |
| 11. | "That's All" | Alan Brandt, Bob Haymes | 3:15 |
| 12. | "Fly Me to the Moon" | Bart Howard | 3:38 |
| 13. | "I Wish You Love" | Charles Trenet, Léo Chauliac, Albert Askew Beach | 3:44 |
| 14. | "As Long as He Needs Me" | Lionel Bart | 4:36 |
