= That's Entertainment! (album) =

Studio album by Judy Garland
- Released: October 31, 1960
- Recorded: 1960
- Studios: Capitol Studios (Los Angeles, CA)
- Length: 32:03
- Label: Capitol
- Producer: Voyle Gilmore

Judy Garland chronology
The Letter (1959)	That's Entertainment! (1960)	Judy at Carnegie Hall (1961)

That's Entertainment! is a studio album by Judy Garland. It was released on October 31, 1960, by Capitol Records, and arranged by Jack Marshall and Conrad Salinger.

Garland turned to her former MGM arranger Conrad Salinger for four full orchestra-backed songs, including the title track, “I’ve Confessed to the Breeze” from No, No, Nanette and ”Alone Together” which was selected for The Band Wagon but not ultimately used in the film.

== Reception ==
Professional ratings
Review scores
Source	Rating
AllMusic	3/5 stars

Cash Box described it as "a wonderfully entertaining session", praising Judy Garland as "a great talent whose disk work is always at a premium" and noting her "vigorously swinging" performances. Billboard noted that Garland was in "good, well-controlled form", highlighted the "well thought-out backings", and concluded that "Garland fans should like this latest edition".

In a retrospective review William Ruhlmann of AllMusic wrote "Five years into her tenure at Capitol Records, Judy Garland had slipped from the top rung of the label's concerns...Nevertheless, the results were engaging. Garland was in good voice and sang with assurance, resulting in another terrific collection.

== Track listing ==
That's Entertainment!
No.	Title	Writer(s)	Length
1.	"That's Entertainment!"	Howard Dietz, Arthur Schwartz	2:31
2.	"Who Cares?"	George Gershwin, Ira Gershwin	1:31
3.	"I've Confessed to the Breeze (I Love You)"	Otto Harbach, Vincent Youmans	3:07
4.	"If I Love Again"	Jack Murray, Ben Oakland	2:42
5.	"Yes"	Dory Previn, André Previn	3:14
6.	"Puttin' on the Ritz"	Irving Berlin	1:59
7.	"Old Devil Moon"	Yip Harburg, Burton Lane	2:57
8.	"Down with Love"	Harold Arlen, Yip Harburg	2:11
9.	"How Long Has This Been Going On?"	George Gershwin, Ira Gershwin	2:53
10.	"It Never Was You"	Maxwell Anderson, Kurt Weill	3:25
11.	"Just You, Just Me"	Jesse Greer, Raymond Klages	1:42
12.	"Alone Together"	Howard Dietz, Arthur Schwartz	3:18

== Personnel ==
- Judy Garland - vocals
- Jack Marshall - arranger and conductor; guitar solos
- Conrad Salinger - orchestral arrangements
- Milt Raskin - piano accompaniment
