= Rock-a-Bye Your Baby with a Dixie Melody =

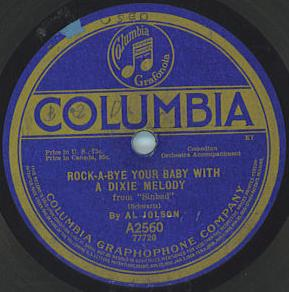
- 78rpm record label

Single by Al Jolson
- B-side: "Alice, I'm in Wonderland (Since the Day That I First Met You)" (Sterling Trio)
- Released: August 1918
- Genre: Popular
- Length: 2:51
- Label: Columbia 2560
- Songwriters: Jean Schwartz, Sam M. Lewis, Joe Young

Al Jolson singles chronology
"Hello Central, Give Me No Man's Land" (1918)	"Rock-a-Bye Your Baby with a Dixie Melody" (1918)	"Tell That to the Marines" (1919)

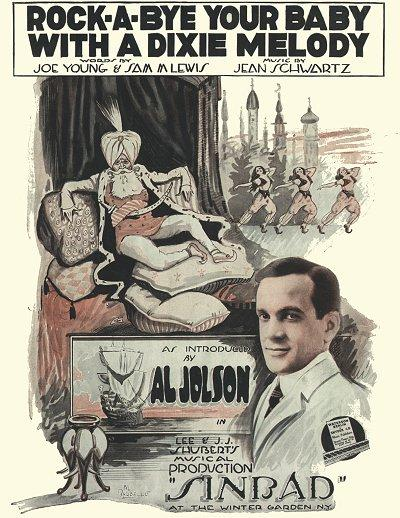
Sheet music cover, 1918

"Rock-a-Bye Your Baby with a Dixie Melody" is a popular song written by Jean Schwartz, with lyrics by Sam M. Lewis and Joe Young. The song was introduced by Al Jolson in the Broadway musical Sinbad and published in 1918.

Probably the best-known version of the song was by Al Jolson who recorded it on March 13, 1918 and whose version reached No. 1 the same year. The original recording of Jolson's version of the song would be re-released in April 2024 as part of the album Al Jolson: Rediscovered.

== Other recordings ==
- Al Jolson recorded the song on December 20, 1932, with Guy Lombardo and his Royal Canadians. Jolson recorded the song again on March 27, 1946, with an orchestra under the direction of Morris Stoloff.
- Arthur Fields - considered to be a No. 9 hit in 1918.
- Dean Martin recorded the song on April 28, 1950.
- Judy Garland included the song in her album Miss Show Business (1955) and her 1960 recording appeared in the compilation album The London Sessions. The song was also included in her live album Judy at Carnegie Hall (1961).
- Jerry Lewis - his version was a Top 10 hit in 1956 and became a gold record
- Aretha Franklin also recorded a version of this song for her album The Electrifying Aretha Franklin, which reached No. 24 in Cash Box and #37 on the Billboard Hot 100 chart in 1961.
- Connie Francis included the song in her album The Exciting Connie Francis (1959).

== Film appearances ==
- A Plantation Act (1926) - sung by Al Jolson
- The Show of Shows (1929) - sung by Sid Silvers
- The Singing Kid (1936) - sung by Al Jolson in the opening medley
- Rose of Washington Square (1939) - performed by Al Jolson
- The Merry Monahans (1944) - sung by Donald O'Connor
- Terms of Endearment (1983) - Judy Garland version heard
