= Judy at Carnegie Hall =

Live album by Judy Garland
- Released: July 10, 1961
- Recorded: April 23, 1961
- Venue: Carnegie Hall
- Genre: Vocal pop
- Length: 122:51
- Label: Capitol
- Producer: Andy Wiswell

Judy Garland chronology
| That's Entertainment! (1960) | Judy at Carnegie Hall (1961) | Judy Garland Live! (1962) |

Judy at Carnegie Hall is the second live album by the American actress and singer Judy Garland. It was released on July 10, 1961, by Capitol Records. The double album became a smash, both critically and commercially, it won the Grammy Award for Album of the Year, making Garland the first woman to win the award, and spent thirteen weeks at #1 on the Billboard album chart.

== Background and album details ==
Garland's career had moved from movies in the 1940s to vaudeville and elaborate stage shows in the 1950s. She also suffered from drug and alcohol abuse, and, by 1959, had become overweight and ill and needed extensive medical treatment. After a long convalescence, weight loss, and vocal rest, she returned in 1960 to the concert stage with a simple program of "just Judy", omitting the vaudeville and comic acts that usually preceded her. Garland's 1960–1961 tour of Europe and North America was a success, and her stage presence was highly regarded. At the time Garland was billed as "The World's Greatest Entertainer".

Audiences were documented as leaving their seats and crowding around the stage to be closer to Garland, and often called her back for encore after encore, even asking her to repeat a song after her book of arrangements was completed. Garland's live performances were a big success at the time and her record company wanted to capture that energy onto a recording.

The album is a live recording of a concert by Garland held at Carnegie Hall in New York City, with backing orchestra conducted by Mort Lindsey. It was recorded on the night of Sunday April 23, 1961 and re-released decades later as an extended, two-disc CD.

== 2001 compact disc release ==
In 2001, Capitol released the album as a double Compact Disc set (catalog number 72435-27876-2-3). This edition has the songs in their original running order, and includes material that was not on the original LP set: Garland's monologues and comments to the audience and orchestra; the orchestra preparing for the next number; and a false start on "Come Rain or Come Shine". The CD release purports to reproduce the concert as the audience heard it, "warts and all".

== Critical reception ==
Professional ratings
Review scores
| Source | Rating |
|---|---|
| AllMusic | 4.5/5 stars |
| Pitchfork | 10/10 |
| The Rolling Stone Album Guide | 5/5 stars |

Cash Box wrote that the album "lives up to its pre-release touting", highlighting "a solid hour-and-a-half of fabulous entertainment by 'Miss Showbusiness'", and concluding that it "should be one of the big LP's of the year". Stanley Green of HiFi Stereo Review wrote that the album is "a you-are-there recording that packs a wallop by any standards", adding that "this on-the-spot recording should convince" listeners of the "mesmeric effect" of Judy Garland, and praised her as "singing at the top of her form" while emphasizing her powerful emotional connection with the audience.

In a retrospective review, AllMusic critic Lindsay Planer described the album as "one of the greatest live albums of all time, and the greatest of Garland's career", noting that "there's true electricity in each song" and praising the performances as "so loaded with emotion". Pitchfork critic Harry Tafoya described the album as "a late-career triumph", emphasizing that it was "widely known as 'the greatest night in show business history'", and that "the singer and her audience were in perfect sync with one another".

== Commercial performance ==
The double album was an enormous best seller, charting for 73 weeks on the Billboard charts, including 13 weeks at No. 1, and being certified Gold. In 2001, after the television miniseries Life with Judy Garland: Me and My Shadows showed Judy Davis recreating Garland's 1961 Carnegie Hall appearance, the album was rereleased in a slightly different form, and it appeared again on the charts, rising to number 20 for internet sales, and number 26 on Billboard's Top Pop Catalog Albums. It has never been out of print.

== Accolades ==
The album won four Grammy Awards, for Album of the Year, Best Female Vocal Performance, Best Engineered Album, and Best Album Cover. In 2003, it was one of 50 recordings chosen by the Library of Congress to be added to the National Recording Registry.

== Legacy ==
Rufus Wainwright recreated Garland's Carnegie hall performance in a 2007 tribute concert that was recorded and filmed for commercial release. The jacket that Garland wore during the iconic event was purchased by Carnegie Hall and is on permanent display there.

== Track listing ==
Side one
| No. | Title | Writer(s) | Length |
|---|---|---|---|
| 1. | "Overture": a) "The Trolley Song" b) "Over the Rainbow" c) "The Man That Got Away" | a) Ralph Blane, Hugh Martin b) Harold Arlen, Yip Harburg c) Harold Arlen, Ira Gershwin | 5:48 |
| 2. | "When You're Smiling (The Whole World Smiles With You)" | Mark Fisher, Joe Goodwin, Larry Shay | 3:29 |
| 3. | "Medley": a) "Almost Like Being in Love" b) "This Can't Be Love" | a) Alan Jay Lerner, Frederick Loewe b) Richard Rodgers, Lorenz Hart | 6:27 |
| 4. | "Do It Again" | George Gershwin, Buddy DeSylva | 6:16 |
| 5. | "You Go to My Head" | J. Fred Coots, Haven Gillespie | 2:43 |
| 6. | "Alone Together" | Howard Dietz, Arthur Schwartz | 5:38 |

Side two
| No. | Title | Writer(s) | Length |
|---|---|---|---|
| 1. | "Who Cares (As Long as You Care for Me)" | George Gershwin, Ira Gershwin | 1:46 |
| 2. | "Puttin' On the Ritz" | Irving Berlin | 2:45 |
| 3. | "How Long Has This Been Going On?" | George Gershwin, Ira Gershwin | 4:12 |
| 4. | "Just You, Just Me" | Jesse Greer, Raymond Klages | 2:16 |
| 5. | "The Man That Got Away" | Harold Arlen, Ira Gershwin | 5:03 |
| 6. | "San Francisco" | Walter Jurmann, Gus Kahn, Bronisław Kaper | 4:45 |
| 7. | "I Can't Give You Anything But Love" | Dorothy Fields, Jimmy McHugh | 6:46 |
| 8. | "That's Entertainment!" | Howard Dietz, Arthur Schwartz | 6:38 |

Side three
| No. | Title | Writer(s) | Length |
|---|---|---|---|
| 1. | "Come Rain or Come Shine" | Harold Arlen, Johnny Mercer | 7:23 |
| 2. | "You're Nearer" | Richard Rodgers, Lorenz Hart | 2:33 |
| 3. | "A Foggy Day" | George Gershwin, Ira Gershwin | 3:04 |
| 4. | "If Love Were All" | Noël Coward | 2:53 |
| 5. | "Zing! Went the Strings of My Heart" | James F. Hanley | 4:04 |
| 6. | "Stormy Weather" | Harold Arlen, Ted Koehler | 6:11 |

Side four
| No. | Title | Writer(s) | Length |
|---|---|---|---|
| 1. | "Medley": a) "You Made Me Love You" b) "For Me and My Gal" c) "The Trolley Song" | a) Joseph McCarthy, James V. Monaco, Roger Edens b) George W. Meyer, Edgar Leslie, E. Ray Goetz c) Hugh Martin, Ralph Blane | 3:56 |
| 2. | "Rock-a-Bye Your Baby with a Dixie Melody" | Sam M. Lewis, Jean Schwartz, Joe Young | 5:22 |
| 3. | "Over the Rainbow" | Harold Arlen, Yip Harburg | 5:47 |
| 4. | "Swanee" | Irving Caesar, George Gershwin | 7:31 |
| 5. | "After You've Gone" | Henry Creamer, Turner Layton | 4:20 |
| 6. | "Chicago" | Fred Fisher | 5:15 |

== Charts ==
Weekly chart performance for Judy at Carnegie Hall
| Chart (1961–2001) | Peak position |
|---|---|
| UK Albums (Official Charts) | 13 |
| US Billboard 200 | 1 |
| US Top Catalog Albums (Billboard) | 26 |

== Certifications and sales ==
Certifications and sales for Judy at Carnegie Hall
| Region | Certification | Certified units/sales |
|---|---|---|
| United States (RIAA) | Gold | 2,000,000 |
