= I Could Go On Singing =

1963 film by Ronald Neame

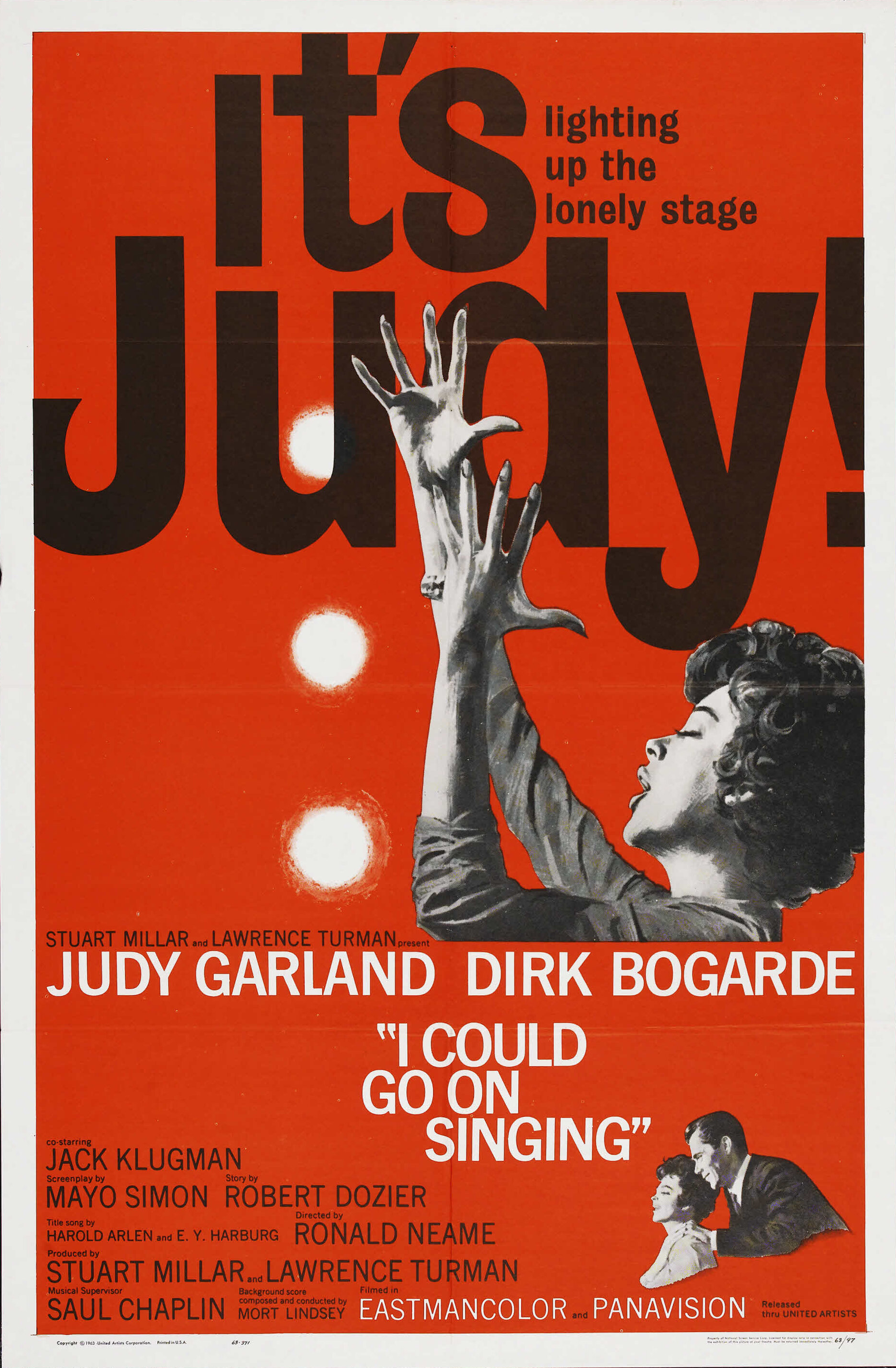
- Release poster
- Directed by: Ronald Neame
- Written by: Mayo Simon; Dirk Bogarde (uncredited)
- Story by: Robert Dozier
- Produced by: Stuart Millar; Lawrence Turman
- Starring: Judy Garland; Dirk Bogarde; Jack Klugman
- Cinematography: Arthur Ibbetson
- Edited by: John Shirley
- Music by: Mort Lindsey
- Distributed by: United Artists
- Release dates: March 7, 1963 (London); March 20, 1963 (Miami); May 15, 1963 (New York)
- Running time: 99 minutes
- Countries: United Kingdom; United States
- Language: English

I Could Go On Singing is a 1963 British-American musical drama film directed by Ronald Neame. It stars Judy Garland in her final film performance, alongside Dirk Bogarde and Jack Klugman. Originally titled The Lonely Stage, the film was renamed so that audiences would know that Garland sings in it, she had not sung in a film since A Star Is Born in 1954. Although not a huge box-office success on release, the film won Garland much praise for her performance. This was Garland's final film before her death in 1969. In his memoir, Bogarde claimed that he had substantially rewritten Garland's lines, with her consent.

== Plot ==
Jenny Bowman is a successful concert singer who regularly tours the world. During a stay in London, she visits recently widowed David Donne, a prominent surgeon. More than a decade ago, the two had an affair that led to the birth of Matt, who is raised by David alone and has been told that he was adopted. Although Jenny and David agreed that Matt would never know the truth, David takes Jenny to Matt's boarding school in Canterbury so that she may meet him just once. Jenny and Matt hit it off and the three spend the whole day together. Jenny invites the two to her concert at the London Palladium, but David is unable to make it because of work in Rome.

With David absent and under the impression that Matt is back at school, Jenny and Matt spend a few days together exploring London. Jenny's manager and assistant try to cover for Matt by calling his school, but word about his absence gets back to David in Rome, who is furious. When David returns to London, he and Jenny have a fight, during which Matt overhears that they are his birth parents. David implores Matt to remain in England and finish his schooling, while Jenny insists that Matt should accompany her on her world tour. Confused, Matt rejects Jenny's invitations and the two agree to see each other again sometime in the future.

Jenny turns to a night of drinking on the town to cope with the heartbreak and ends up twisting her ankle. At a clinic, she demands that David come to treat her. When he arrives, she claims to be quitting singing as she is "stretched too thin and everyone wants a bite," but David insists that she cannot let herself down this way and tells her that he loves her. At her concert that night, Jenny sings marvelously to the crowd. David leaves midway through her first number.

== Cast ==
- Judy Garland as Jenny Bowman
- Dirk Bogarde as David Donne
- Jack Klugman as George Kogan (Jenny Bowman's manager)
- Gregory Phillips as Matt
- Aline MacMahon as Ida, Miss Bowman's dresser
- Pauline Jameson as Miss Plimpton, Donne's nurse/receptionist
- Jeremy Burnham as Hospital surgeon
- Lorna Luft as Girl on boat (uncredited)
- Joey Luft as Boy on boat (uncredited)
- Leon Cortez as Busker
- Robert Rietty as Manager, London Palladium
- Gerald Sim as Joe, Assistant Manager, London Palladium
- Frazer Hines as a Schoolboy
- Tony Robinson as a Schoolboy

== Release ==
The film had its world premiere at the Plaza Theatre in London's West End on 6 March 1963. A soundtrack album was released by Capitol Records at the time of the original film release and re-issued in 2002 by Capitol on a CD along with a re-issue of Garland's ninth studio album, That's Entertainment!. The film was released as home media on LaserDisc in 1989, on VHS in 1992 (both released by MGM/UA Home Video), on DVD in May 2004 by MGM/UA Home Video, on DVD in 2013 by Acorn Media, on Blu-ray in 2016 by Twilight Time, on Blu-Ray in 2023 by Sandpiper Pictures and on DVD in 2023 by Final Cut Entertainment.

== Music ==
All songs performed by Judy Garland:

- "I Am the Monarch of the Sea" (Judy Garland and Boys) from H.M.S. Pinafore by Gilbert and Sullivan
- "Hello Bluebird", words and music by Cliff Friend
- "'It Never Was You" by Kurt Weill and Maxwell Anderson
- "By Myself" by Arthur Schwartz and Howard Dietz
- "I Could Go On Singing" by Harold Arlen and E. Y. Harburg
- "Please Say Ah" [song deleted from final print; the film's musical supervisor Saul Chaplin was at least one creator of the song and provides the male voice on the YouTube clip]

== Reception ==
In the New York Herald Tribune, Judith Crist wrote, "You'll see her in close-up...in beautiful, glowing Technicolor and striking staging in a vibrant, vital performance that gets to the essence of her mystique as a superb entertainer. [...] Certainly the role of a top-rank singer beset by the loneliness and emotional hungers of her personal life is not an alien one to her..."

Writing in the New York Daily News, Dorothy Masters said, "...Judy Garland is back on screen in a role that might have been custom-tailored for her particular talents. A new song, I Could Go On Singing, provides her with a little clowning, a chance to be gay, a time for wistfulness, an occasion for tears."

== Novelization ==
A paperback novelization of the screenplay (uncredited in the book's authorship) was written by celebrated mystery novelist John D. MacDonald, perhaps best known as the creator of private investigator Travis McGee. It was published in 1963 by Gold Medal Books to coincide with the film's release. There was only one US printing, although a UK publisher, Robert Hale, followed up with a hardcover in 1964. In 2013, trade and ebook editions, tacitly marking the novelization's 50th anniversary and its first-ever reprint, were released by Random House; the ebook is still available.
