= Judy in Love =

Studio album by Judy Garland
- Released: November 3, 1958
- Recorded: 1958
- Studios: Capitol Studios (Los Angeles, CA)
- Length: 32:18
- Label: Capitol
- Producer: Voyle Gilmore

Judy Garland chronology
Alone (1957)	Judy in Love (1958)	Garland at the Grove (1959)

Judy in Love is a studio album by Judy Garland released on November 3, 1958, by Capitol Records. The album was conceived as a contrast to the sad themes of her previous album, Alone, with Nelson Riddle providing arrangements that move between swing, slow ballads, and Latin-influenced rhythms, while reworking standards like "Zing! Went the Strings of My Heart" and "I Can't Give You Anything but Love". The repertoire, largely drawn from pre-1940 songs, including several by Cole Porter, is presented with a degree of emotional distance, reframing themes of infatuation as expressions of mature passion suited to Garland's stage in life. The LP was her first to be recorded in stereo.

== Critical reception ==
Professional ratings
Review scores
Source	Rating
AllMusic	4/5 stars

Cash Box described the album as "a Judy Garland effort that's a natural sales plum", praising her "positive vocals on love" delivered with "artful buoyancy and touching tenderness". William Ruhlmann of AllMusic called it "a gem", and highlighted how it recontextualizes classic love songs into expressions of "mature passion".

Playbill described the album as "a peak-period Judy singing terrific arrangements of terrific songs in terrific voice".

== Track listing ==
Judy in Love
No.	Title	Writer(s)	Length
1.	"Zing! Went the Strings of My Heart"	James F. Hanley	3:39
2.	"I Can't Give You Anything but Love, Baby"	Dorothy Fields, Jimmy McHugh	4:39
3.	"This Is It"	Dorothy Fields, Arthur Schwartz	2:18
4.	"More Than You Know"	Edward Eliscu, Billy Rose, Vincent Youmans	3:19
5.	"I Am Loved"	Cole Porter	3:14
6.	"I Hadn't Anyone Till You"	Ray Noble	3:32
7.	"I Concentrate on You"	Cole Porter	3:22
8.	"(I'm) Confessin' (That I Love You)"	Doc Daugherty, Al J. Neiburg, Ellis Reynolds	2:44
9.	"Do I Love You?"	Cole Porter	3:15
10.	"Do It Again"	Buddy DeSylva, George Gershwin	2:38
11.	"Day In, Day Out"	Rube Bloom, Johnny Mercer	3:54

== Personnel ==
- Judy Garland – vocals
- Nelson Riddle – conductor, arranger
