= Zing! Went the Strings of My Heart =

1935 popular song

Single by the Trammps
- B-side: "Penguin At The Big Apple"
- Released: 1972
- Genre: Philadelphia soul
- Length: 3:18
- Label: Buddah Records
- Songwriter: James F. Hanley

The Trammps singles chronology
"Zing! Went the Strings of My Heart" (1972)	"Sixty Minute Man" (1972)

"Zing! Went the Strings of My Heart" is a 1935 popular song written and composed by James F. Hanley. It was introduced by Hal Le Roy and Eunice Healey in the Broadway revue Thumbs Up!.

== Notable recordings ==
- The most notable recordings were made by Judy Garland, who recorded it numerous times, including in the 1938 film Listen, Darling and for Decca Records in 1939. It later became a standard number in her concerts and TV shows when she performed it as an up-tempo arrangement by Nelson Riddle from her 1958 Capitol album.
- In 1941 a Soundie short film was made of Eleanor French singing "Zing! Went the Strings of My Heart".
- The Kirby Stone Four - Baubles, Bangles, And Beads (1958)
- The Coasters released a rock and roll version on April 30, 1958 as the flip side of their No. 1 hit "Yakety Yak". This version would inspire the British band The Move to record the song in the late '60s.
- In 1962, the song was recorded by The Furys.
- In December 1960, after Frank Sinatra founded his own music label Reprise Records, he recorded his rendition of the song.
- In 1972, a recording by the Trammps reached No. 17 on the Billboard, Best Selling Soul Singles chart and No. 64 on the Hot 100. It reached No. 29 in the UK in 1974.
