= Harold Arlen =

American composer (1905–1986)

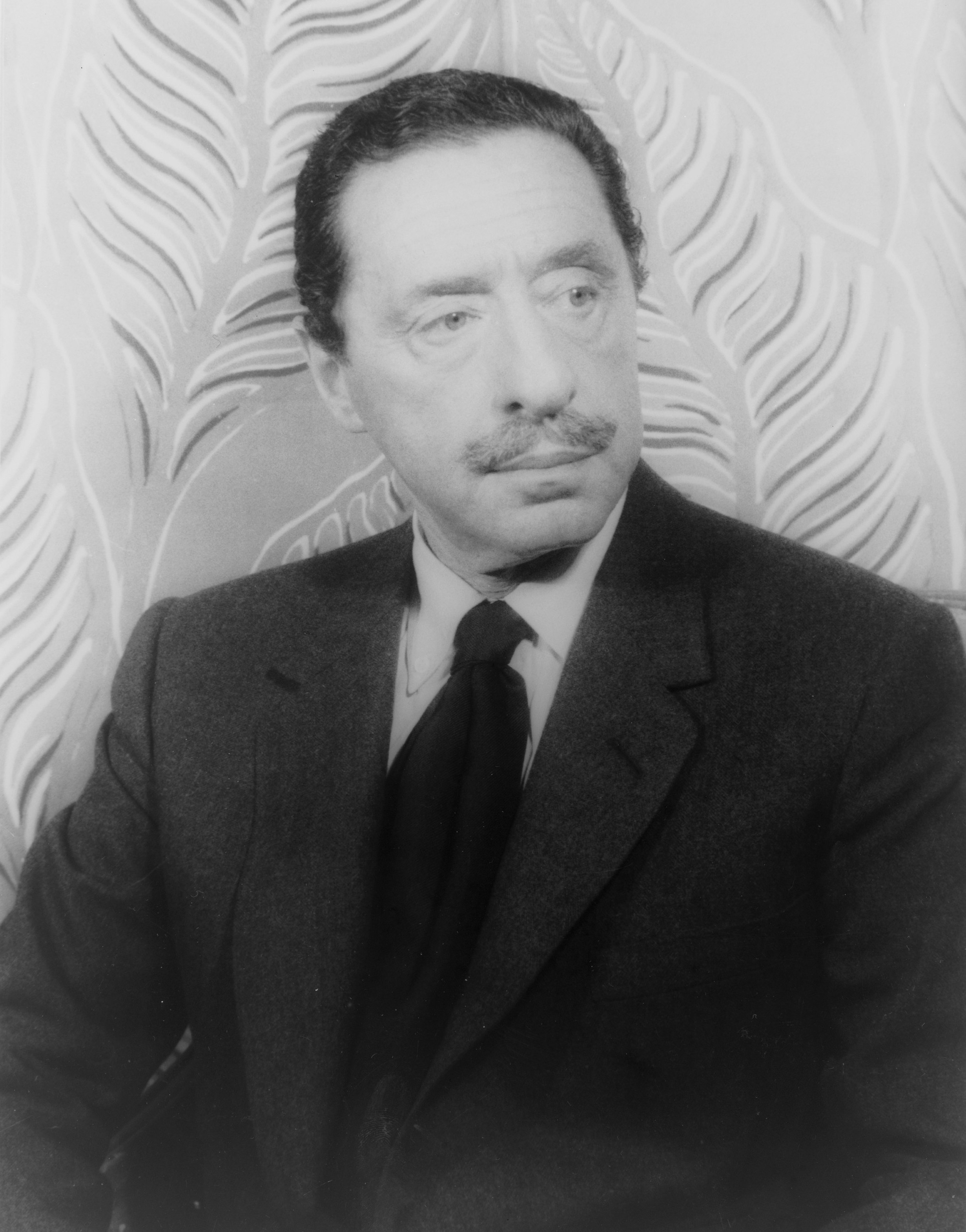
- Arlen in 1960
- Born: Hyman Arluck; February 15, 1905; Buffalo, New York, U.S.
- Died: April 23, 1986 (aged 81); New York City, U.S.
- Resting place: Ferncliff Cemetery
- Occupation: Composer
- Spouse: Anya Taranda (m. 1937; died 1970)
- Children: Adopted his brother's son in 1985

Harold Arlen (born Hyman Arluck; February 15, 1905 – April 23, 1986) was an American composer of popular music, who composed over 500 songs, a number of which have become known worldwide. In addition to composing the songs for the 1939 film The Wizard of Oz (lyrics by Yip Harburg), including "Over the Rainbow", which won him the Oscar for Best Original Song, he was nominated as composer for 8 other Oscar awards. Arlen is a contributor to the Great American Songbook. "Over the Rainbow" was voted the 20th century's No. 1 song by the RIAA and the NEA.

== Early life and education ==
Arlen was born in Buffalo, New York, the child of a Jewish cantor. His twin brother died the next day. He learned to play the piano as a youth, and formed a band, Hyman Arluck's Snappy Trio, at age 15. He left home at 16 against his parents' wishes; within two years, he was performing on the Crystal Beach lake boat "Canadiana" with his new band, The Southbound Shufflers. In 1924, he performed at the Lake Shore manor and co-wrote his first song, "My Gal, My Pal", with his friend Hyman Cheiffetz. They copyrighted it as "My Gal, Won't You Please Come Back to Me?" and attribute the lyrics to Cheiffetz and music to Harold Arluck. He achieved some local success as a pianist and singer before moving to New York City in his early twenties, where he worked as an accompanist in vaudeville and changed his name to Harold Arlen.

== Career ==
Between 1926 and about 1934, Arlen appeared occasionally as a band vocalist on records by The Buffalodians, Red Nichols, Joe Venuti, Leo Reisman, and Eddie Duchin, usually singing his own compositions. He also played piano with The Buffalodians. In 1926, he and Dick George wrote "Minor Gaff (Blues Fantasy)", which became his first published song.

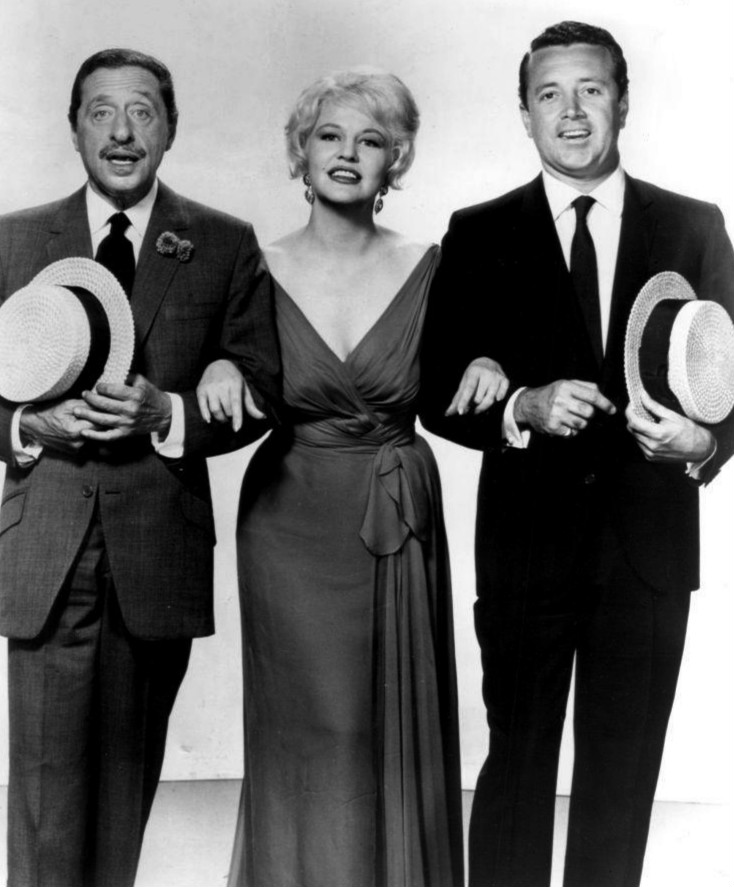
Arlen (left) performs with Peggy Lee and Vic Damone in 1961

In 1929, Arlen composed his first well-known song: "Get Happy" (with lyrics by Ted Koehler) and subsequently signed a yearlong song-writing contract with the George and Arthur Piantadosi firm. The same year, he held a singing and acting gig as Cokey Joe in the musical The Great Day. Throughout the early and mid-1930s, Arlen and Koehler wrote shows for the Cotton Club, a popular Harlem night club, as well as for Broadway musicals and Hollywood films. Arlen and Koehler's partnership resulted in a number of hit songs, including the familiar standards "Let's Fall in Love" and "Stormy Weather". For their last show at the Cotton Club Parade in 1934, he and Ted Koehler wrote "Ill Wind (You're Blowin' Me No Good)", with lyrics by Koehler and sung by Adelaide Hall Arlen continued to perform as a pianist and vocalist with some success, most notably on records with Leo Reisman's society dance orchestra.

In the mid-1930s, Arlen married, and spent increasing time in California, writing for movie musicals. It was at this time that he began working with lyricist E. Y. "Yip" Harburg. He signed with Samuel Goldwyn in 1935 to write songs for the film Strike Me Pink. In 1938, the team was hired by Metro-Goldwyn-Mayer to compose songs for The Wizard of Oz, the most famous of which is "Over the Rainbow", for which they won the Academy Award for Best Music, Original Song. They also wrote "Down with Love" (featured in the 1937 Broadway show Hooray for What!), "Lydia the Tattooed Lady", for Groucho Marx in At the Circus in 1939, and "Happiness Is a Thing Called Joe", for Ethel Waters in the 1943 movie Cabin in the Sky. Arlen was a longtime friend and one-time roommate of actor Ray Bolger, who starred in The Wizard of Oz.

In the 1940s, he teamed up with lyricist Johnny Mercer, and continued to write hit songs like "Blues in the Night", "Out of this World", "That Old Black Magic", "Ac-Cent-Tchu-Ate the Positive", "Any Place I Hang My Hat Is Home", "Come Rain or Come Shine" and "One for My Baby (and One More for the Road)". In 1949, he collaborated with Ralph Blane to write the score for My Blue Heaven. The following year, he and Mercer worked on the film The Petty Girl, out of which came the song "Fancy Free". He worked with Dorothy Fields on the 1952 film The Farmer Takes a Wife. Arlen composed two of the defining songs of Judy Garland's career: "Over the Rainbow" and "The Man That Got Away", the last written for the 1954 version of the film A Star Is Born. At her famous 1961 Carnegie Hall concert, after finishing a set of his songs, Garland acknowledged Arlen in the audience and invited him to receive an ovation.

In 1962, he wrote the score for the animated musical Gay Purr-ee, with lyrics by E.Y. Harburg. Arlen recorded his debut album as a vocalist, Harold Sings Arlen (With Friend), in 1966. Barbra Streisand accompanied him on two songs. The theme song for the ABC sitcom Paper Moon is based on the song of that title, written by Arlen and Harburg in 1932. The series was based on a 1973 Peter Bogdanovich film of the same name, which used the same song. He was inducted into the American Theater Hall of Fame in 1979.

== Personal life ==
Arlen and Anya Taranda married on January 6, 1937, over the objection of their parents, because she was Gentile and he was Jewish. Arlen's father died in 1953. In 1951, Anya was institutionalized for seven years. Coming home the same year that Celia Arluk (Harold's mother) had died, she was diagnosed with a brain tumor in 1969, which became fatal by 1970.

Arlen never remarried. He died of cancer on April 23, 1986, at his Manhattan apartment at the age of eighty-one. He was buried at Ferncliff Cemetery in Hartsdale, New York next to his wife after his funeral service at Frank E. Campbell Funeral Chapel. After Arlen's death, Irving Berlin summed up his life at a tribute, saying: "He wasn't as well known as some of us, but he was a better songwriter than most of us and he will be missed by all of us."

Shortly before his death, Arlen adopted his nephew, Samuel, the 22-year-old adult son of his brother Julius "Jerry" Arluck, so that his estate would have an heir who could extend the copyright of his songs. Known as Samuel Arlen, he is a saxophonist and music publisher; his control extends to the company that owns the rights to the Arlen catalog.

== Works for Broadway ==
- Earl Carroll's Vanities of 1930 (1930) – revue – contributing composer
- You Said It (1931) – musical – composer
- Earl Carroll's Vanities of 1932 (1932) – revue – co-composer and co-lyricist with Ted Koehler
- Americana (1932) – revue – contributing composer
- George White's Music Hall Varieties (1933) – revue – co-composer
- Life Begins at 8:40 (1934) – revue – composer
- The Show Is On (1936) – revue – contributing composer
- Hooray for What! (1937) – musical – composer
- Bloomer Girl (1944) – musical – composer
- St. Louis Woman (1946) – musical – composer
- House of Flowers (1954) – musical – composer and co-lyricist
- Mr. Imperium (1951) – movie musical – featured composer
- Jamaica (1957) – musical – composer – Tony nomination for Best Musical
- Saratoga (1959) – musical – composer

== Major songs ==
- "A Sleepin' Bee" – lyrics by Harold Arlen and Truman Capote
- "Ac-Cent-Tchu-Ate the Positive" – lyrics by Johnny Mercer
- "Any Place I Hang My Hat Is Home" – lyrics by Johnny Mercer
- "As Long as I Live" – lyrics by Ted Koehler
- "Between the Devil and the Deep Blue Sea" – lyrics by Ted Koehler
- "Blues in the Night" – lyrics by Johnny Mercer
- "Come Rain or Come Shine" – lyrics by Johnny Mercer
- "Ding-Dong! The Witch Is Dead" – lyrics by E. Y. Harburg
- "Down with Love" – lyrics by E. Y. Harburg
- "For Every Man There's a Woman" – lyrics by Leo Robin
- "Get Happy" – lyrics by Ted Koehler
- "Happiness Is a Thing Called Joe" – lyrics by E. Y. Harburg
- "Hit the Road to Dreamland" – lyrics by Johnny Mercer
- "I Could Go On Singing" – lyrics by E. Y. Harburg
- "If I Only Had a Brain" – lyrics by E. Y. Harburg
- "I Gotta Right to Sing the Blues" – lyrics by Ted Koehler
- "Ill Wind" – lyrics by Ted Koehler
- "It Was Written in the Stars" – lyrics by Leo Robin
- "I've Got the World on a String" – lyrics by Ted Koehler
- "It's Only a Paper Moon" – lyrics by E. Y. Harburg, Billy Rose
- "Last Night When We Were Young" – lyrics by E. Y. Harburg
- "Let's Fall in Love" – lyrics by Ted Koehler
- "Let's Take a Walk Around the Block" – lyrics by Ira Gershwin and E. Y. Harburg
- "Lydia the Tattooed Lady" – lyrics by E. Y. Harburg
- "My Shining Hour" – lyrics by Johnny Mercer
- "On the Swing Shift" – lyrics by Johnny Mercer
- "One for My Baby (and One More for the Road)" – lyrics by Johnny Mercer
- "Out of This World" – lyrics by Johnny Mercer
- "Over the Rainbow" – lyrics by E. Y. Harburg
- "Sing My Heart" – lyrics by Ted Koehler
- "Stormy Weather" – lyrics by Ted Koehler
- "That Old Black Magic" – lyrics by Johnny Mercer
- "The Man That Got Away" – lyrics by Ira Gershwin
- "This Time the Dream's on Me" – lyrics by Johnny Mercer
- "When the Sun Comes Out" – lyrics by Ted Koehler

== Films ==
- 2003 – Stormy Weather: The Music of Harold Arlen (directed by Larry Weinstein)

== Sources ==
- Jablonski, Edward (1961). Harold Arlen: Happy With the Blues. Doubleday. ASIN B0007DP988.
- Jablonski, Edward (1996). Harold Arlen: Rhythm, Rainbows, and Blues. University Press of New England. ISBN 978-1555532635.
- Rimler, Walter (2015). The Man That Got Away: The Life and Songs of Harold Arlen. University of Illinois Press. ISBN 978-0252039461.
