= List of recordings by Judy Garland =

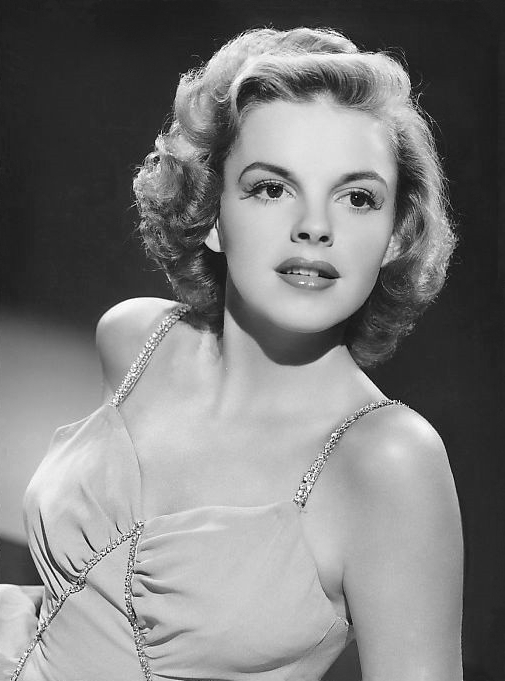
Publicity photo of Garland from 1943.

This article is a list of recordings made by Judy Garland. Throughout her career Garland recorded numerous soundtracks for her films, as well as studio recordings for Decca, Columbia and Capitol Records. In addition to these soundtrack and studio recordings, Garland would also perform numerous songs on her 1963–1964 CBS television series, The Judy Garland Show, with an array of famous guest performers. Garland also performed countless times on the radio and gave hundreds of concerts throughout her career, many of these performances were recorded and have survived in audio format.

== Soundtrack recordings (1929–1967) ==
Key
‡	Indicates a song that was omitted from the film and the recording has not survived
‡	Indicates a song that was omitted from the film, but the recording survives
‡	Indicates a song that was omitted from the film, but was reinstated for the 1983 restoration

Title	Recorded	Artist(s)	Writer(s)	Film	Ref.
"That's the Good Old Sunny South"	June 11, 1929; June 12, 1929; June 13, 1929	The Gumm Sisters	Jack Yellen; Milton Ager	The Big Revue (1929)	
"When the Butterflies Kiss the Buttercups Goodnight"	November 1929	The Gumm Sisters	Harry Pease; Charles O'Flynn; Ed G. Nelson	A Holiday in Storyland (1930)	
"Blue Butterfly"	November 1929	Frances Gumm	Johnny Tucker; Joe Schuster	A Holiday in Storyland (1930)	
"Hang Onto a Rainbow"	November 1929	Frances Gumm	Bud Green; Sammy Stept	The Wedding of Jack and Jill (1930)	
"The Land of Let's Pretend"	December 1929	The Gumm Sisters	Grant Clarke; Harry Akst	Bubbles (1930)	
"La Cucaracha"	August 12, 1935	The Garland Sisters	Traditional	La Fiesta de Santa Barbara (1935)	
"Opera vs. Jazz" ("Americana" Reprise)	June 30, 1936	Judy Garland and Deanna Durbin	Con Conrad	Every Sunday (1936)	
"Waltz with a Swing / Americana" (Medley)	June 30, 1936	Judy Garland	Roger Edens; Con Conrad	Every Sunday (1936)	
"The Texas Tornado"	August 1936	Judy Garland	Sidney D. Mitchell; Lew Pollack	Pigskin Parade (1936)	
"The Balboa"	August 1936	Judy Garland, Dixie Dunbar, Johnny Downs, Betty Grable, Jack Haley, Patsy Kelly, and the Yacht Club Boys	Sidney D. Mitchell; Lew Pollack	Pigskin Parade (1936)	
"It's Love I'm After"	August 1936	Judy Garland	Sidney D. Mitchell; Lew Pollack	Pigskin Parade (1936)	
"Hold That Bulldog" ‡	August 1936	Judy Garland	Sidney D. Mitchell; Lew Pollack	Pigskin Parade (1936)	
"Your Broadway and My Broadway" ‡	March 14, 1937	Judy Garland and the MGM Studio Chorus	Nacio Herb Brown; Arthur Freed	Broadway Melody of 1938 (1937)	
"Everybody Sing"	March 5, 1937; June 12, 1937	Judy Garland, Sophie Tucker, Barnett Parker, J.D. Jewkes, and the MGM Studio Chorus	Nacio Herb Brown; Arthur Freed	Broadway Melody of 1938 (1937)	
"Yours and Mine" ‡	April 16, 1937	Judy Garland, Eloise Rawitzer, and the St. Brendan's Boys Choir	Nacio Herb Brown; Arthur Freed	Broadway Melody of 1938 (1937)	
"(Dear Mr. Gable) You Made Me Love You"	May 7, 1937	Judy Garland	James V. Monaco; Joseph McCarthy; Roger Edens	Broadway Melody of 1938 (1937)	
"I'm Feelin' Like a Million" (Rehearsal)	August 1937	Judy Garland with Roger Edens on piano	Nacio Herb Brown; Arthur Freed	Broadway Melody of 1938 (1937)	
"Swing, Mr. Mendelssohn"	August 26, 1937	Judy Garland and the St. Brendan's Boys Choir	Bronislau Kaper; Walter Jurmann; Gus Kahn	Everybody Sing (1938)	
"Sun Showers" ‡	September 11, 1937	Judy Garland	Nacio Herb Brown; Arthur Freed	Thoroughbreds Don't Cry (1937)	
"Got a Pair of New Shoes"	September 20, 1937	Judy Garland	Nacio Herb Brown; Arthur Freed	Thoroughbreds Don't Cry (1937)	
"Got a Pair of New Shoes" (Overture Version)	October 24, 1937	Judy Garland	Nacio Herb Brown; Arthur Freed	Thoroughbreds Don't Cry (1937)	
"Got a Pair of New Shoes" (Finale Version)	October 24, 1937	Judy Garland, Mickey Rooney, and Ronald Sinclair	Nacio Herb Brown; Arthur Freed	Thoroughbreds Don't Cry (1937)	
"Down on Melody Farm"	October 4, 1937	Judy Garland	Bronislau Kaper; Walter Jurmann; Gus Kahn	Everybody Sing (1938)	
"Swing Low, Sweet Chariot"	October 24, 1937	Judy Garland	Wallace Willis	Everybody Sing (1938)	
"Silent Night"	November 6, 1937; November 7, 1937; November 8, 1937	Judy Garland	Joseph Mohr; Franz Xaver Gruber	Silent Night (1937)	
"Ever Since the World Began / Shall I Sing a Melody?"	December 13, 1937	Judy Garland and the MGM Studio Chorus	Roger Edens	Everybody Sing (1938)	
"Why? Because!"	December 21, 1937	Judy Garland and Fanny Brice	Bert Kalmar	Everybody Sing (1938)	
"It Never Rains, But What It Pours"	June 21, 1938	Judy Garland	Harry Revel; Mack Gordon	Love Finds Andy Hardy (1938)	
"Bei mir bist du schön" ‡	June 21, 1938	Judy Garland	Sholom Secunda; Jacob Jacobs; Saul Chaplin; Sammy Cahn	Love Finds Andy Hardy (1938)	
"In Between"	June 24, 1938	Judy Garland	Roger Edens	Love Finds Andy Hardy (1938)	
"Meet the Beat of My Heart"	June 24, 1938	Judy Garland	Harry Revel; Mack Gordon	Love Finds Andy Hardy (1938)	
"Ten Pins in the Sky"	July 28, 1938	Judy Garland	Milton Ager; Joseph McCarthy	Listen, Darling (1938)	
"Zing! Went the Strings of My Heart"	September 16, 1938	Judy Garland	James F. Hanley	Listen, Darling (1938)	
"Zing! Went the Strings of My Heart" (Swing Version) ‡	September 16, 1938	Judy Garland	James F. Hanley	Listen, Darling (1938)	
"If I Only Had the Nerve"	September 20, 1938	Bert Lahr, Ray Bolger, Jack Haley, and Judy Garland	Harold Arlen; E.Y. Harburg	The Wizard of Oz (1939)	
"On the Bumpy Road to Love"	September 26, 1938	Judy Garland, Mary Astor, Freddie Bartholomew, and Scotty Beckett	Al Hoffman; Al Lewis; Murray Mencher	Listen, Darling (1938)	
"On the Bumpy Road to Love" (Finale Version)	September 26, 1938	Judy Garland, Mary Astor, Freddie Bartholomew, and Scotty Beckett	Al Hoffman; Al Lewis; Murray Mencher	Listen, Darling (1938)	
"If I Only Had a Brain" (Original Version) ‡	September 30, 1938	Ray Bolger and Judy Garland	Harold Arlen; E.Y. Harburg	The Wizard of Oz (1939)	
"The Jitterbug" ‡	October 6, 1938; December 22, 1938	Judy Garland, Ray Bolger, Jack Haley, Buddy Ebsen, and Bert Lahr	Harold Arlen; E.Y. Harburg	The Wizard of Oz (1939)	
"Over the Rainbow"	October 7, 1938	Judy Garland	Harold Arlen; E.Y. Harburg	The Wizard of Oz (1939)	
"We're Off to See the Wizard" (Duo)	October 11, 1938; July 9, 1939	Judy Garland and Ray Bolger	Harold Arlen; E.Y. Harburg	The Wizard of Oz (1939)	
"We're Off to See the Wizard" (Trio)	October 11, 1938; July 9, 1939	Judy Garland and Ray Bolger	Harold Arlen; E.Y. Harburg	The Wizard of Oz (1939)	
"We're Off to See the Wizard" (Quartet)	October 11, 1938; July 9, 1939	Judy Garland and Ray Bolger	Harold Arlen; E.Y. Harburg	The Wizard of Oz (1939)	
"If I Were King of the Forest"	October 11, 1938; May 8, 1939	Bert Lahr, Judy Garland, Ray Bolger, Jack Haley, and Buddy Ebsen	Harold Arlen; E.Y. Harburg	The Wizard of Oz (1939)	
"Munchkinland Musical Sequence": 1. "Come Out, Come Out..."; 2. "It Really Was No Miracle"; 3. "We Thank You Very Sweetly"; 4. "Ding-Dong! The Witch Is Dead"; 5. "As Mayor of the Munchkin City"; 6. "As Coroner, I Must Aver"; 7. "Ding-Dong! The Witch Is Dead (Reprise)"; 8. "The Lullaby League"; 9. "The Lollipop Guild"; 10. "We Welcome You to Munchkinland"	December 14, 1938; December 15, 1938; December 16, 1938; December 19, 1938; December 22, 1938; April 13, 1939	Billie Burke, Judy Garland, Billy Bletcher, Joseph Koziel, Frank Cucksey, Pinto Colveg, J.D. Jewkes, Harry Stanton, Lorraine Bridges, Betty Rome, Carol Tevis, and the Munchkins	Harold Arlen; E.Y. Harburg	The Wizard of Oz (1939)	
"Over the Rainbow" (Reprise) ‡	October 17, 1938; May 6, 1939	Judy Garland	Harold Arlen; E.Y. Harburg	The Wizard of Oz (1939)	
"The Merry Old Land of Oz"	December 28, 1938; December 30, 1938; January 3, 1939; May 8, 1939	Frank Morgan, Judy Garland, Ray Bolger, Jack Haley, Bert Lahr, Tyler Brook, Ralph Sudam, Bobby Watson, Oliver Smith, Charles Irwin, Lois January, Elivda Rizzo, Lorraine Bridges, and the MGM Studio Chorus	Harold Arlen; E.Y. Harburg	The Wizard of Oz (1939)	
"If I Only Had a Brain"	February 28, 1939; April 11, 1939	Ray Bolger and Judy Garland	Harold Arlen; E.Y. Harburg	The Wizard of Oz (1939)	
"Opera vs. Jazz": 1. "Opera vs. Jazz, Part 1"; 2. "Opera vs. Jazz, Part 2 (You Are My Lucky Star)"; 3. "Opera vs. Jazz, Part 3 (Figaro)"; 4. "Opera vs. Jazz, Part 4 (Lucia di Lammermoor / Broadway Rhythm)"	May 15, 1939	Judy Garland, Betty Jaynes, and Mickey Rooney	Roger Edens; Nacio Herb Brown; Arthur Freed; Gaetano Donizetti	Babes in Arms 1939)	
"Good Morning"	May 15, 1939	Mickey Rooney and Judy Garland	Nacio Herb Brown; Arthur Freed	Babes in Arms 1939)	
"Where or When"	May 15, 1939	Douglas McPhail, Betty Jaynes, and Judy Garland	Richard Rodgers; Lorenz Hart	Babes in Arms 1939)	
"Babes in Arms"	May 23, 1939	Douglas McPhail, Judy Garland, Mickey Rooney, Betty Jaynes, and the MGM Studio Chorus	Richard Rodgers; Lorenz Hart; Roger Edens	Babes in Arms 1939)	
"I Cried for You (Now It's Your Turn to Cry Over Me)"	May 23, 1939	Judy Garland	Arthur Freed; Gus Arnheim; Abe Lyman	Babes in Arms 1939)	
"Minstrel Show Sequence": 1. "Minstrel Show, Part 1"; 2. "De Camptown Races / Old Folks at Home / Oh! Suzanna"; 3. "Minstrel Show, Part 2"; 4. Minstrel Show, Part 3; 5. Ida, Sweet as Apple Cider / (On) Moonlight Bay; 6. "I'm Just Wild About Harry"	June 27, 1939	Judy Garland, Mickey Rooney, Douglas McPhail, the Crinoline Choir, and the MGM Studio Chorus	Roger Edens; Stephen Collins Foster; Eddie Munson; Eddie Leonard; Percy Wenrich; Edward Madde; Eubie Blake; Noble Sissle	Babes in Arms 1939)	
"Finale": 1. "Finale, Part 1 (God's Country)"; 2. "Finale, Part 2 (My Day)"; 3. "Finale, Part 3"; 4. "Finale, Part 4 (Good Morning)"; 5. "Finale, Part 5 (God's Country)"	June 27, 1939; July 12, 1939	Mickey Rooney, Judy Garland, Douglas McPhail, Betty Jaynes, the MGM Studio Chorus, and the MGM Studio Orchestra	Roger Edens; Nacio Herb Brown; Harold Arlen; E.Y. Harburg	Babes in Arms 1939)	
"I'm Nobody's Baby"	March 14, 1940	Judy Garland	Benny Davis; Milton Ager; Lester Santly	Andy Hardy Meets Debutante (1940)	
"Buds Won't Bud" ‡	March 14, 1940	Judy Garland	Harold Arlen, E.Y. Harburg	Andy Hardy Meets Debutante (1940)	
"Nobody"	April 12, 1940	Judy Garland	Roger Edens	Strike Up the Band (1940)	
"Our Love Affair"	April 12, 1940; July 26, 1940; July 27, 1940; August 31, 1940	Mickey Rooney, Judy Garland, and the MGM Studio Orchestra	Roger Edens; Arthur Freed	Strike Up the Band (1940)	
"Nelle of New Rochelle"	April 23, 1940; May 8, 1940; July 26, 1940; July 27, 1940; August 31, 1940	Mickey Rooney, Judy Garland, June Preisser, William Tracy, Larry Nunn, Margaret Early, and the MGM Studio Chorus	arr. by Roger Edens	Strike Up the Band (1940)	
"Alone"	May 10, 1940	Judy Garland	Nacio Herb Brown; Arthur Freed	Andy Hardy Meets Debutante (1940)	
"All I Do Is Dream of You" ‡	May 10, 1940	Judy Garland	Nacio Herb Brown; Arthur Freed	Andy Hardy Meets Debutante (1940)	
"Drummer Boy"	June 8, 1940	Judy Garland, Mickey Rooney, Six Hits and a Miss, and the MGM Studio Chorus	Roger Edens	Strike Up the Band (1940)	
"Do the La Conga"	June 27, 1940	Judy Garland, Mickey Rooney, Six Hits and a Miss, and the MGM Studio Chorus	Roger Edens	Strike Up the Band (1940)	
"Finale": 1. "Finale, Part 1"; 2. "Finale, Part 2 (Strike Up the Band)"; 3. "Finale, Part 3 (Do the La Conga)"; 4. "Finale, Part 4 (Our Love Affair)"; 5. "Finale, Part 5 (Drummer Boy)"; 6. "Finale, Part 6 (Strike Up the Band)"	June 27, 1940	Judy Garland, Mickey Rooney, Six Hits and a Miss, and the MGM Studio Orchestra and Chorus	Roger Edens	Strike Up the Band (1940)	
"It's a Great Day for the Irish"	August 9, 1940	Judy Garland, Douglas McPhail, and the MGM Studio Chorus	Roger Edens	Little Nellie Kelly (1940)	
"Nellie Kelly, I Love You"	August 9, 1940	Judy Garland, Douglas McPhail, George Murphy, and the MGM Studio Chorus	George M. Cohan	Little Nellie Kelly (1940)	
"Nellie Kelly, I Love You" (Finale Reprise)	August 9, 1940	Judy Garland, Douglas McPhail, George Murphy, and the MGM Studio Chorus	George M. Cohan	Little Nellie Kelly (1940)	
"Singin' in the Rain"	September 9, 1940	Judy Garland	Nacio Herb Brown; Arthur Freed	Little Nellie Kelly (1940)	
"A Pretty Girl Milking Her Cow" (Reprise)	September 9, 1940	Judy Garland	Roger Edens	Little Nellie Kelly (1940)	
"Danny Boy" ‡	September 10, 1940	Judy Garland	F.E. Weatherly	Little Nellie Kelly (1940)	
"A Pretty Girl Milking Her Cow"	September 10, 1940	Judy Garland	Roger Edens	Little Nellie Kelly (1940)	
"Laugh? I Thought I'd Split My Sides"	November 1940	Judy Garland and Charles Winninger	Roger Edens	Ziegfeld Girl (1941)	
"I'm Always Chasing Rainbows" (Audition)	November 13, 1940	Judy Garland	Joseph McCarthy; Harry Carroll	Ziegfeld Girl (1941)	
"I'm Always Chasing Rainbows"	November 13, 1940	Judy Garland	Joseph McCarthy; Harry Carroll	Ziegfeld Girl (1941)	
"We Must Have Music" ‡	December 22, 1940	Judy Garland, Tony Martin, and Six Hits and a Miss	Nacio Herb Brown; Gus Kahn	Ziegfeld Girl (1941)	
"I'm Always Chasing Rainbows" (Finale Reprise) ‡	December 22, 1940	Judy Garland	Joseph McCarthy; Harry Carroll	Ziegfeld Girl (1941)	
"Minnie from Trinidad"	January 14, 1941; February 24, 1941	Judy Garland and the MGM Studio Chorus	Roger Edens	Ziegfeld Girl (1941)	
"Finale": 1. "Ziegfeld Girls"; 2. "You Gotta Pull Strings"; 3. "You Never Looked So Beautiful Before"; 4. "You Stepped Out of a Dream"; 5. "You Never Looked So Beautiful Before"	March 1941	Judy Garland, Dorothy Hoyle, Christine Stafford, Rose Paidar, Betty Allen, Virginia Rees, Helen Patterson, Tony Martin, and the MGM Studio Chorus	Roger Edens; Walter Donaldson; Harold Adamson; Nacio Herb Brown; Gus Kahn	Ziegfeld Girl (1941)	
"America (My Country, 'Tis of Thee)" ‡	May 19, 1941	Judy Garland	Samuel Francis Smith	Life Begins for Andy Hardy (1941)	
"Abide with Me" ‡	June 4, 1941	Judy Garland	Henry Francis Lyte; William Henry Monk	Life Begins for Andy Hardy (1941)	
"The Rosary" ‡	June 4, 1941	Judy Garland	Robert Cameron Rogers; Ethelbert Nevin	Life Begins for Andy Hardy (1941)	
"Easy to Love" ‡	June 4, 1941	Judy Garland	Cole Porter	Life Begins for Andy Hardy (1941)	
"How About You"	July 18, 1941	Judy Garland and Mickey Rooney	Burton Lane; Ralph Freed	Babes on Broadway (1941)	
"Bombshell from Brazil"	August 11, 1941; October 27, 1941	Annie Rooney, Richard Quine, Virginia Weidler, Ray McDonald, Judy Garland, Robert Bradford, and the MGM Studio Chorus	Roger Edens	Babes on Broadway (1941)	
"Hoe Down"	August 29, 1941; October 27, 1941	Judy Garland, Mickey Rooney, Six Hits and a Miss, the Five Music Maids & the MGM Studio Chorus	Roger Edens	Babes on Broadway (1941)	
"Minstrel Show Sequence": 1. "Minstrel Show, Part 1"; 2. "Blackout Over Broadway"; 3. "Minstrel Show, Part 2"; 4. "By the Light of the Silvery Moon"; 5. "Minstrel Show, Part 3"; 6. "F.D.R. Jones"; 7. "Minstrel Show, Part 4"; 8. "Swanee River"; 9. "Alabamy Bound"; 10. "Minstrel Show, Part 5 / Waiting for the Robert E. Lee"	September 2, 1941; September 23, 1941; September 24, 1941; October 24, 1941; November 17, 1941	Judy Garland, Mickey Rooney, Ray McDonald, Virginia Weidler, Richard Quine, Annie Rooney, Richard Quine, Eddie Peabody (banjo), the Uptowners, the Dick Davis Quartet, and the MGM Studio Orchestra and Chorus	Roger Edens; Burton Lane; Ralph Freed; Gus Edwards; Edward Madden; Harold J. Rome; Stephen Collins Foster; Ray Henderson; Lewis F. Muir; L. Wolf Gilbert	Babes on Broadway (1941)	
"Chin Up! Cheerio! Carry On!"	September 10, 1941	Judy Garland, Saint Luke's Episcopal Church Choristers, and the MGM Studio Chorus	Burton Lane; E.Y. Harburg	Babes on Broadway (1941)	
"Babes on Broadway"	September 24, 1941	Judy Garland, Mickey Rooney, Ray McDonald, Virginia Weidler, Richard Quine, Annie Rooney, and the MGM Studio Chorus	Burton Lane; Ralph Freed	Babes on Broadway (1941)	
"Ghost Theatre Sequence": 1. "Ghost Theatre Prelude"; 2. "Mary's a Grand Old Name"; 3. "She Is Ma Daisy"; 4. "I've Got Rings on My Fingers"; 5. "Bernhardt (La Marseillaise)"; 6. "The Yankee Doodle Boy"	October 10, 1941; October 27, 1941	Judy Garland, Mickey Rooney, and the MGM Studio Orchestra	Roger Edens; George M. Cohan; Harry Lauder; J.D. Harper; Maurice Scott; R.P. Weston; F.J. Barnes; Claude Joseph Rouget de Lisle	Babes on Broadway (1941)	
"Jimmy K. Metcalfe & Company": 1. "The Doll Shop, Part 1"; 2. "Oh, You Beautiful Doll"; 3. "The Doll Shop, Part 1" (Continued); 4. "Don't Leave Me, Daddy"; 5. "Oh, You Beautiful Doll" (Reprise); 6. "The Doll Shop, Part 2"; 7. "By the Beautiful Sea"; 8. "Darktown Strutters Ball"	March 20, 1942; June 17, 1942	Lucille Norman, George Murphy, Judy Garland, Ben Blue, and the MGM Studio Orchestra and Chorus	Roger Edens; Nat D. Ayer; Seymour Brown; Joe Verges; Harry Carroll; Harold Atteridge; Shelton Brooks	For Me and My Gal (1942)	
"For Me and My Gal"	March 20, 1942; March 21, 1942	Judy Garland and Gene Kelly	George W. Meyer; Edgar Leslie; E. Ray Goetz; Roger Edens	For Me and My Gal (1942)	
"Ballin' the Jack"	March 21, 1942	Judy Garland and Gene Kelly	Chris Smith; Jame Henry Burris	For Me and My Gal (1942)	
"After You've Gone"	March 24, 1942; June 17, 1942	Judy Garland and Gene Kelly	Henry Creamer; Turner Layton	For Me and My Gal (1942)	
"For Me and My Gal" (Finale Reprise) ‡	March 27, 1942	Judy Garland, George Murphy, Gene Kelly, and the MGM Studio Chorus	George W. Meyer; Edgar Leslie; E. Ray Goetz; Roger Edens	For Me and My Gal (1942)	
"Till We Meet Again"	March 27, 1942	Lucille Norman, Judy Garland, the Kings Men, and the MGM Studio Chorus	Richard A. Whiting; Raymond E. Egan	For Me and My Gal (1942)	
"How Ya Gonna Keep 'Em Down on the Farm"	March 27, 1942	Judy Garland and the MGM Studio Chorus	Walter Donaldson; Sam M. Lewis; Joe Young	For Me and My Gal (1942)	
"Where Do We Go from Here"	March 27, 1942	Judy Garland, the King's Men, and the MGM Studio Chorus	Percy Wenrich; Howard Johnson	For Me and My Gal (1942)	
"Y.M.C.A. Montage": 1. "Over There / It's a Long Way to Tipperary"; 2. "Y.M.C.A. Montage (Continued) / Goodbye Broadway, Hello France"; 3. "Yankee Doodle / Smiles"; 4. "Hinky Dinky Parlay Voo / Oh, Frenchy"; 5. "Y.M.C.A. Montage, (Continued) / Pack Up Your Troubles in Your Old Kit Bag and Smile, Smile, Smile"	May 26, 1942	Judy Garland, Gene Kelly, Ben Blue, and the MGM Studio Orchestra and Chorus	George M. Cohan; Harry Williams; Jack Judge; Roger Edens; Billy Baskette; C. Francis Reisner; Benny Davis; Dr. Richard Shackburg; Lee M. Roberts; J. Will Callahan; Con Conrad; Sam Ehrich; Felix Powell; George Asaf	For Me and My Gal (1942)	
"Vaudeville Montage": 1. "When You Wore a Tulip"; 2. "Don't Bite the Hand That's Feeding You" (Outtake)	May 26, 1942; June 17, 1942	Gene Kelly, Judy Garland, Abe Dinovitch, and Maude Erickson	Percy Wenrich; Jack Mahoney; James Morgan; Thomas Hoier; Richard Wagner; Arthur Pryor	For Me and My Gal (1942)	
"Three Cheers for the Yanks" ‡	May 27, 1942	Judy Garland, Six Hits and a Miss, and the MGM Studio Chorus	Hugh Martin; Ralph Blane	For Me and My Gal (1942)	
"When Johnny Comes Marching Home"	June 25, 1942	Judy Garland and the MGM Studio Chorus	Lewis Lambert; Roger Edens	For Me and My Gal (1942)	
"For Me and My Gal" (Finale Reprise)	June 25, 1942	Judy Garland, Gene Kelly, and the MGM Studio Chorus	George W. Meyer; Edgar Leslie; E. Ray Goetz	For Me and My Gal (1942)	
"Smiles" ‡	June 25, 1942	Judy Garland, Six Hits and a Miss, and the MGM Studio Chorus	Lee M. Roberts; J. Will Callahan	For Me and My Gal (1942)	
"Every Little Movement Has a Meaning of Its Own"	July 28, 1942	Judy Garland and Mary Kent	K. Hoschna; Otto Harbach	Presenting Lily Mars (1943)	
"Tom, Tom, the Piper's Son"	July 28, 1942	Judy Garland and the MGM Studio Orchestra	Burton Lane; E.Y. Harburg	Presenting Lily Mars (1943)	
"When I Look at You"	September 18, 1942	Judy Garland with Bob Crosby and His Orchestra	Walter Jurmann; Paul Francis Webster	Presenting Lily Mars (1943)	
"When I Look at You" (Comedy Version)	September 18, 1942	Judy Garland	Walter Jurmann; Paul Francis Webster	Presenting Lily Mars (1943)	
"Paging Mr. Greenback" ‡	October 16, 1942	Judy Garland	Sammy Fain; E.Y. Harburg	Presenting Lily Mars (1943)	
"The Joint Is Really Jumpin' Down at Carnegie Hall"	December 22, 1942	Judy Garland and Jose Iturbi	Roger Edens; Hugh Martin; Ralph Blane	Thousands Cheer (1943)	
"I Got Rhythm"	December 29, 1942; January 2, 1943; February 2, 1943	Judy Garland, Mickey Rooney, Six Hits and a Miss, the Music Maids, Hal Hopper, Trudy Erwin, Bobbie Canvin, Tommy Dorsey and His Orchestra & the MGM Studio Chorus	George Gershwin; Ira Gershwin	Girl Crazy (1943)	
"Bronco Busters" ‡	January 2, 1943	Mickey Rooney, Judy Garland, Nancy Walker & the MGM Studio Orchestra and Chorus	George Gershwin; Ira Gershwin	Girl Crazy (1943)	
"Where There's Music" (Finale Medley): 1. "Where There's Music"; 2. "St. Louis Blues"; 3. "It's a Long Way to Tipperary"; 4. "In the Shade of the Old Apple Tree"; 5. "Don't Sit Under the Apple Tree"; 6. "It's Three O'clock in the Morning"; 7. "Broadway Rhythm"	March 4, 1943; March 5, 1943	Judy Garland, Judy Carol, Charles Walters, Tommy Dorsey and His Orchestra, and the MGM Studio Chorus	Roger Edens; W.C. Handy; John Judge; H.H. Williams; Edward Van Alstyne; Steven Stept; Lew Brown; Charlie Tobias; Julian Robledo; Dorothy Terris; Nacio Herb Brown; Arthur Freed	Presenting Lily Mars (1943)	
"But Not for Me"	March 29, 1943	Judy Garland	George Gershwin; Ira Gershwin	Girl Crazy (1943)	
"Bidin' My Time"	April 14, 1943	Judy Garland, the King's Men, and the MGM Studio Orchestra	George Gershwin; Ira Gershwin	Girl Crazy (1943)	
"Embraceable You"	April 15, 1943	Judy Garland, Henry Kruze, P. Hanna, G. Mershon, H. Stanton, E. Newton, and the MGM Studio Chorus, with Tommy Dorsey and His Orchestra	George Gershwin; Ira Gershwin	Girl Crazy (1943)	
"Embraceable You" (End Title)	April 15, 1943	Mickey Rooney, Judy Garland, and the MGM Studio Chorus	George Gershwin; Ira Gershwin	Girl Crazy (1943)	
"Could You Use Me?"	April 28, 1943	Mickey Rooney and Judy Garland	George Gershwin; Ira Gershwin	Girl Crazy (1943)	
"Walking in the Garden"	June 9, 1943	The MGM Studio Orchestra, with humming by Judy Garland and whistling by Roger Edens	George Gershwin; David Raksin	Girl Crazy (1943)	
"Boys and Girls Like You and Me" ‡	November 3, 1943	Judy Garland	Richard Rogers; Oscar Hammerstein II	Meet Me in St. Louis (1944)	
"Meet Me in St. Louis, Louis"	December 1, 1943	Joan Carroll, Harry Davenport, Judy Garland, and the MGM Studio Chorus	Kerry Mills; Andrew B. Sterling	Meet Me in St. Louis (1944)	
"The Trolley Song"	December 2, 1943	Judy Garland and the MGM Studio Chorus	Hugh Martin; Ralph Blane	Meet Me in St. Louis (1944)	
"Meet Me in St. Louis, Louis" (Duet Version)	December 3, 1943	Judy Garland and Lucille Bremer	Kerry Mills; Andrew B. Sterling	Meet Me in St. Louis (1944)	
"Skip to My Lou"	December 3, 1943	Judy Garland, Lucille Bremer, and Ensemble	Traditional; Hugh Martin; Ralph Blane	Meet Me in St. Louis (1944)	
"The Boy Next Door"	December 4, 1943	Judy Garland	Hugh Martin; Ralph Blane	Meet Me in St. Louis (1944)	
"Have Yourself a Merry Little Christmas"	December 4, 1943	Judy Garland	Hugh Martin; Ralph Blane	Meet Me in St. Louis (1944)	
"Under the Bamboo Tree"	December 17, 1943	Judy Garland and Margaret O'Brien	Bob Cole	Meet Me in St. Louis (1944)	
"Over the Bannister"	May 26, 1944	Judy Garland and Tom Drake	Conrad Salinger; Roger Edens	Meet Me in St. Louis (1944)	
"The Interview"	July 17, 1944	Judy Garland and the MGM Studio Chorus	Roger Edens; Kay Thompson	Ziegfeld Follies (1945)	
"It's a Great Big World"	January 5, 1945; June 30, 1945	Judy Garland, Virginia O'Brien, and Marion Doenges	Harry Warren; Johnny Mercer	The Harvey Girls (1946)	
"On the Atchison, Topeka and the Santa Fe"	January 5, 1945; January 6, 1945; January 8, 1945; April 18, 1945; June 30, 1945	Judy Garland, Cyd Charisse, Virginia O'Brien, Marjorie Main, Ray Bolger, Benny Carter, The Seckler Group, The Williams Brothers, Alice Ludes, Dorothy McCarthy, Lee Botch, Jud Conlon, Ralph Blane, Loulie Jean Norman, Dorothy Jackson, Judy Matson, Mary Moder, Ruth Clark, Jimmie Garland, Dorothy Wilkerson, Vivian Edwards, Joe Karnes, Kenneth Rundquist, Claude Martin, Arnet Amos, Elva Kellogg, and the MGM Studio Chorus	Harry Warren; Johnny Mercer; Kay Thompson; Ralph Blane	The Harvey Girls (1946)	
"Training Montage (The Train Must Be Fed)"	January 13, 1945; June 30, 1945	Edward Earle, Selena Royle, Marjorie Main, Joe Karnes, Elva Kellogg, Judy Garland, Virginia O'Brien, Cyd Charisse, and the MGM Studio Chorus	Roger Edens; Conrad Salinger; Harry Warren	The Harvey Girls (1946)	
"In the Valley (Where the Evening Sun Goes Down)"	February 16, 1945	Judy Garland	Harry Warren; Johnny Mercer	The Harvey Girls (1946)	
"My Intuition" ‡	February 16, 1945; June 30, 1945	Judy Garland and John Hodiak	Harry Warren; Johnny Mercer	The Harvey Girls (1946)	
"In the Valley (Where the Evening Sun Goes Down)" (Reprise) ‡	February 17, 1945	Kenny Baker, Judy Garland, and the MGM Studio Chorus	Harry Warren; Johnny Mercer	The Harvey Girls (1946)	
"March of the Doagies" ‡	February 17, 1945	Judy Garland, Joe Karnes, Frank Laine, Don Ellis, Eugene Dorian, Ralph Blane, Don Williams & the MGM Studio Chorus	Harry Warren; Johnny Mercer	The Harvey Girls (1946)	
"March of the Doagies" (Reprise) ‡	February 17, 1945	Judy Garland and the MGM Studio Chorus	Harry Warren; Johnny Mercer	The Harvey Girls (1946)	
"Hayride ‡	February 19, 1945	Ray Bolger, Judy Garland, and the MGM Studio Chorus	Harry Warren; Johnny Mercer	The Harvey Girls (1946)	
"Swing Your Partner Round and Round"	February 19, 1945	Judy Garland, Marjorie Main, and the MGM Studio Chorus	Harry Warren; Johnny Mercer	The Harvey Girls (1946)	
"In the Valley (Where the Evening Sun Goes Down)" (Vocal / Piano Demo)	April 23, 1945	Judy Garland and Kay Thompson, with Roger Edens on piano	Harry Warren; Johnny Mercer; Alfred H. Miles; Royal Lovell; Charles Zimmerman	The Harvey Girls (1946)	
"Look for the Silver Lining"	October 2, 1945	Judy Garland	Jerome Kern; Buddy DeSylva	Till the Clouds Roll By (1946)	
"Who?"	October 9, 1945	Judy Garland and the MGM Studio Chorus	Jerome Kern; Oscar Hammerstein II; Otto Harbach	Till the Clouds Roll By (1946)	
"D' Ya Love Me" ‡	October 15, 1945	Judy Garland	Jerome Kern; Oscar Hammerstein II; Otto Harbach	Till the Clouds Roll By (1946)	
"Love of My Life" ‡	December 27, 1946	Judy Garland and the MGM Studio Chorus	Cole Porter	The Pirate (1948)	
"Mack the Black" (1st Version) ‡	December 28, 1946	Judy Garland and the MGM Studio Chorus	Cole Porter	The Pirate (1948)	
"Mack the Black" (2nd Version) ‡	February 12, 1947	Judy Garland and the MGM Studio Chorus	Cole Porter	The Pirate (1948)	
"Voodoo" ‡	April 10, 1947	Judy Garland	Cole Porter	The Pirate (1948)	
"You Can Do No Wrong"	May 3, 1947	Judy Garland	Cole Porter	The Pirate (1948)	
"Love of My Life" (Reprise)	May 3, 1947	Judy Garland	Cole Porter	The Pirate (1948)	
"Be a Clown" (Finale)	July 14, 1947	Judy Garland and Gene Kelly	Cole Porter	The Pirate (1948)	
"I Want to Go Back to Michigan (Down on the Farm)"	November 12, 1947; February 19, 1948	Judy Garland	Irving Berlin	Easter Parade (1948)	
"Mr. Monotony" ‡	November 12, 1947	Judy Garland	Irving Berlin	Easter Parade (1948)	
"A Couple of Swells"	November 13, 1947	Judy Garland and Fred Astaire	Irving Berlin	Easter Parade (1948)	
"Vaudeville Montage": 1. "I Love a Piano"; 2. "Snookey Ookums"; 3. "The Ragtime Violin"; 4. "When the Midnight Choo-Choo Leaves for Alabam'"	November 17, 1947; February 18, 1948	Judy Garland and Fred Astaire	Irving Berlin	Easter Parade (1948)	
"A Fella with an Umbrella"	January 7, 1948; January 17, 1948; March 10, 1948	Judy Garland and Peter Lawford	Irving Berlin	Easter Parade (1948)	
"It Only Happens When I Dance with You" (Reprise)	January 7, 1948	Judy Garland	Irving Berlin	Easter Parade (1948)	
"Better Luck Next Time"	January 7, 1948; January 17, 1948	Judy Garland and Clinton Sundberg	Irving Berlin	Easter Parade (1948)	
"Easter Parade" (Finale)	January 26, 1948	Judy Garland and Fred Astaire	Irving Berlin	Easter Parade (1948)	
"Mack the Black"	December 15, 1947	Judy Garland and the MGM Studio Chorus	Cole Porter	The Pirate (1948)	
"I Wish I Were in Love Again"	May 28, 1948	Judy Garland and Mickey Rooney	Richard Rodgers; Lorenz Hart	Words and Music (1948)	
"Johnny One Note"	September 30, 1948	Judy Garland	Richard Rodgers; Lorenz Hart	Words and Music (1948)	
"Last Night When We Were Young" ‡	November 16, 1948	Judy Garland	Harold Arlen; E.Y.Harburg	In the Good Old Summertime (1949)	
"Put Your Arms Around Me, Honey"	November 16, 1948	Judy Garland and Van Johnson	Alber Von Tilzer; Junie McRee	In the Good Old Summertime (1949)	
"Merry Christmas"	November 16, 1948	Judy Garland	Fred Spielman; Janice Torre	In the Good Old Summertime (1949)	
"Meet Me Tonight in Dreamland"	November 16, 1948	Judy Garland	Beth Slater-Whitson; Leo Friedman	In the Good Old Summertime (1949)	
"I Don't Care"	November 17, 1948	Judy Garland	Harry Sutton; Jean Lennox	In the Good Old Summertime (1949)	
"Play That Barbershop Chord"	November 17, 1948	Judy Garland and the King's Men	Lewis Muir; William Tracy; Ballard MacDonald	In the Good Old Summertime (1949)	
"In the Good Old Summertime" (Finale Reprise) ‡	November 17, 1948	Judy Garland, Van Johnson, the King's Men, and the MGM Studio Orchestra	George Evans; Ren Shields	In the Good Old Summertime (1949)	
"You Can't Get a Man with a Gun" ‡	March 25, 1949	Judy Garland	Irving Berlin	Annie Get Your Gun (unfinished)	
"Doin' What Comes Natur'lly" ‡	March 25, 1949	Judy Garland	Irving Berlin	Annie Get Your Gun (unfinished)	
"They Say It's Wonderful" ‡	March 28, 1949	Judy Garland and Howard Keel	Irving Berlin	Annie Get Your Gun (unfinished)	
"They Say It's Wonderful" (Reprise) ‡	March 28, 1949	Judy Garland	Irving Berlin	Annie Get Your Gun (unfinished)	
"The Girl That I Marry" (Reprise) ‡	March 28, 1949	Judy Garland	Irving Berlin	Annie Get Your Gun (unfinished)	
"Let's Go East Again" ‡	March 30, 1949	Judy Garland and Male Chorus	Irving Berlin	Annie Get Your Gun (unfinished)	
"There's No Business Like Show Business" ‡	March 31, 1949	Judy Garland, Howard Keel, Frank Morgan, Keenan Wynn, Bill Seclar, and Mac McLain	Irving Berlin	Annie Get Your Gun (unfinished)	
"There's No Business Like Show Business" (Reprise) ‡	March 31, 1949	Judy Garland	Irving Berlin	Annie Get Your Gun (unfinished)	
"I've Got the Sun in the Morning" ‡	April 1, 1949	Judy Garland	Irving Berlin	Annie Get Your Gun (unfinished)	
"Anything You Can Do" ‡	April 1, 1949	Judy Garland and Howard Keel	Irving Berlin	Annie Get Your Gun (unfinished)	
"I'm an Indian, Too" ‡	April 25, 1949	Judy Garland and Male Chorus	Irving Berlin	Annie Get Your Gun (unfinished)	
"(Howdy, Neighbor) Happy Harvest"	October 13, 1949; February 2, 1950	Judy Garland and the MGM Studio Chorus	Harry Warren; Mack Gordon	Summer Stock (1950)	
"If You Feel Like Singing, Sing"	October 13, 1949	Judy Garland	Harry Warren; Mack Gordon	Summer Stock (1950)	
"Friendly Star"	October 27, 1949	Judy Garland and the MGM Studio Orchestra	Harry Warren; Mack Gordon	Summer Stock (1950)	
"All for You"	February 2, 1950	Judy Garland, Gene Kelly, and the MGM Studio Chorus	Saul Chaplin	Summer Stock (1950)	
"(Howdy, Neighbor) Happy Harvest" (Finale Reprise)	February 2, 1950	Judy Garland, Gene Kelly, Phil Silvers, and the MGM Studio Chorus	Harry Warren; Mack Gordon	Summer Stock (1950)	
"You, Wonderful You"	February 3, 1950	Judy Garland and Gene Kelly	Harry Warren; Saul Chaplin; Jack Brooks	Summer Stock (1950)	
"You, Wonderful You" (Reprise)	February 13, 1950	Judy Garland and Gene Kelly	Harry Warren; Saul Chaplin; Jack Brooks	Summer Stock (1950)	
"Get Happy"	March 15, 1950	Judy Garland and the MGM Studio Chorus	Harold Arlen; Ted Koehler	Summer Stock (1950)	
"Here's What I'm Here For"	August 21, 1953	Judy Garland and Chorus	Ira Gershwin; Harold Arlen	A Star Is Born (1954)	
"Gotta Have Me Go with You"	August 22, 1953	Judy Garland, Don McKabe, and Jack Harmon	Ira Gershwin; Harold Arlen	A Star Is Born (1954)	
"The Man That Got Away"	September 4, 1953	Judy Garland	Ira Gershwin; Harold Arlen	A Star Is Born (1954)	
"It's a New World" ‡	November 23, 1953	Judy Garland	Ira Gershwin; Harold Arlen	A Star Is Born (1954)	
"Someone at Last"	November 23, 1953	Judy Garland, James Mason, and Chorus	Ira Gershwin; Harold Arlen	A Star Is Born (1954)	
"It's a New World" (Reprise)	December 5, 1953	Judy Garland	Ira Gershwin; Harold Arlen	A Star Is Born (1954)	
"Lose That Long Face" ‡	March 1, 1954	Judy Garland	Ira Gershwin; Harold Arlen	A Star Is Born (1954)	
"Lose That Long Face" (Complete Version) ‡	March 1, 1954	Judy Garland with Monette Moore	Ira Gershwin; Harold Arlen	A Star Is Born (1954)	
"The Trinidad Coconut Oil Shampoo Commercial"	March 1954	Judy Garland	Unknown	A Star Is Born (1954)	
"Born in a Trunk" (Medley): 1. "Swanee"; 2. "Born in a Trunk"; 3. "I'll Get By"; 4. "You Took Advantage of Me"; 5. "The Black Bottom"; 6. "Peanut Vendor"; 7. "My Melancholy Baby"; 8. "Swanee" (Reprise); 9. "Born in a Trunk"	May 28, 1954; June 14, 1954; June 15, 1954; June 16, 1954; June 18, 1954; July 15, 1954	Judy Garland and Chorus	Ira Gershwin; I. Caesar; L. Gershe; R. Turk; F. Ahlert; Lorenz Hart; Richard Rodgers; R. Henderson; L. Brown; B.G. DeSylva; M. Simons; M. Sunshine; L.W. Gilbert; G.A. Norton; E. Burnett	A Star Is Born (1954)	
"When My Sugar Walks Down the Street" ‡	June 16, 1954	Judy Garland and Jack Baker	G. Austin; J. McHugh; I. Mills	A Star Is Born (1954)	
"The Far Away Part of Town"	April 1960	Judy Garland	Dory Langdon Previn; André Previn	Pepe (1960)	
"Gay Purr-ee Overture"	November 1961	Judy Garland and Chorus	Harold Arlen; E.Y.Harburg	Gay Purr-ee (1962)	
"Little Drops of Rain"	November 1961	Judy Garland	Harold Arlen; E.Y.Harburg	Gay Purr-ee (1962)	
"Take My Hand, Paree"	November 1961	Judy Garland	Harold Arlen; E.Y.Harburg	Gay Purr-ee (1962)	
"Paris Is a Lonely Town"	November 1961	Judy Garland	Harold Arlen; E.Y.Harburg	Gay Purr-ee (1962)	
"Red Roses, Blue Violets"	November 1961	Judy Garland	Harold Arlen; E.Y.Harburg	Gay Purr-ee (1962)	
"Mewsette Finale"	November 1961	Judy Garland, Robert Goulet, and Chorus	Harold Arlen; E.Y.Harburg	Gay Purr-ee (1962)	
"Hello Bluebird"	May 9, 1962	Judy Garland	Cliff Friend	I Could Go on Singing (1963)	
"By Myself"	May 9, 1962	Judy Garland	Howard Dietz; Arthur Schwartz	I Could Go on Singing (1963)	
"It Never Was You" ‡	May 9, 1962	Judy Garland	Maxwell Anderson; Kurt Weill	I Could Go on Singing (1963)	
"I Am the Monarch of the Sea" (Recorded live on set)	May 1962	Judy Garland and Boys	W.S. Gilbert; Arthur Sullivan	I Could Go on Singing (1963)	
"It Never Was You" (Recorded live on set)	May 1962	Judy Garland	Maxwell Anderson; Kurt Weill	I Could Go on Singing (1963)	
"I Could Go on Singing"	July 9, 1962	Judy Garland	Harold Arlen; E.Y. Harburg	I Could Go on Singing (1963)	
"Please Say 'Ah'!" ‡	July 9, 1962	Judy Garland and Saul Chaplin		I Could Go on Singing (1963)	
"I'll Plant My Own Tree" ‡	March 27, 1967	Judy Garland	Dory Previn; André Previn	Valley of the Dolls (1967)	

== Decca recordings (1935–1947) ==
Title	Recorded	Artist(s)	Writer(s)	Original release	Year	Ref
"Moonglow"	March 29, 1935	The Garland Sisters with Ethel Gumm at the piano	Will Hudson; Irving Mills; Eddie DeLange	Lost recording	—N/a	
"Bill"	March 29, 1935	Judy Garland with Ethel Gumm at the piano	Jerome Kern; P.G. Wodehouse	Lost Tracks 1929–1959	2010	
Medley: a) "On the Good Ship Lollipop" b) "The Object of My Affection" c) "Dinah"	March 29, 1935	Judy Garland with Ethel Gumm at the piano	Richard A. Whiting; Sidney Clare; Pinky Tomlin; Harry Akst; Sam M. Lewis; Joe Young	Lost Tracks 1929–1959	2010	
"No Other One"	November 27, 1935	Judy Garland	Unknown	Lost recording	—N/a	
"All's Well"	November 27, 1935	Judy Garland	Unknown	Lost recording	—N/a	
"Stompin' at the Savoy"	June 12, 1936	Judy Garland with Bob Crosby and His Orchestra	Edgar Sampson	Single A-side	1936	
"Swing, Mr. Charlie"	June 12, 1936	Judy Garland with Bob Crosby and His Orchestra	Harry Brooks; J. Russel Robinson; Irving Taylor	"Stompin' at the Savoy" B-side	1936	
"Everybody Sing"	August 30, 1937	Judy Garland with Harry Sosnik and His Orchestra	Nacio Herb Brown; Arthur Freed	Single A-side	1937	
"Everybody Sing" (Alternate)	August 30, 1937	Judy Garland with Harry Sosnik and His Orchestra	Nacio Herb Brown; Arthur Freed	Smilin' Through: The Singles Collection, 1936—1947	2011	
"All God's Chillun Got Rhythm"	August 30, 1937	Judy Garland with Harry Sosnik and His Orchestra	Walter Jurmann; Gus Kahn; Bronisław Kaper	"Everybody Sing" B-side	1937	
"All God's Chillun Got Rhythm" (Alternate)	August 30, 1937	Judy Garland with Harry Sosnik and His Orchestra	Walter Jurmann; Gus Kahn; Bronisław Kaper	Smilin' Through: The Singles Collection, 1936—1947	2011	
"(Dear Mr. Gable) You Made Me Love You"	September 24, 1937	Judy Garland with Harry Sosnik and His Orchestra	James V. Monaco; Joseph McCarthy; Roger Edens	Single A-side	1937	
"(Dear Mr. Gable) You Made Me Love You" (Alternate)	September 24, 1937	Judy Garland with Harry Sosnik and His Orchestra	James V. Monaco; Joseph McCarthy; Roger Edens	Smilin' Through: The Singles Collection, 1936—1947	2011	
"You Can't Have Ev'rything"	September 24, 1937	Judy Garland with Harry Sosnik and His Orchestra	Mack Gordon; Harry Revel	"(Dear Mr. Gable) You Made Me Love You" B-side	1937	
"Sleep, My Baby, Sleep"	April 25, 1938	Judy Garland with Harry Sosnik and His Orchestra	Eddie Pola; Franz Vienna	"Cry, Baby, Cry" B-side	1938	
"Cry, Baby, Cry"	April 25, 1938	Judy Garland with Harry Sosnik and His Orchestra	Jimmy Eaton; Terry Shand; Remus Harris; Irving Melsher	Single A-side	1938	
"Cry, Baby, Cry" (Alternate)	April 25, 1938	Judy Garland with Harry Sosnik and His Orchestra	Jimmy Eaton; Terry Shand; Remus Harris; Irving Melsher	Smilin' Through: The Singles Collection, 1936—1947	2011	
"Ten Pins in the Sky"	August 21, 1938	Judy Garland with Harry Sosnik and His Orchestra	Joseph McCarthy; Milton Ager	"It Never Rains, But What It Pours"	1938	
"It Never Rains, But What It Pours"	August 21, 1938	Judy Garland with Harry Sosnik and His Orchestra	Mack Gordon; Harry Revel	Single A-side	1938	
"Over the Rainbow"	July 28, 1939	Judy Garland with Victor Young and His Orchestra	Harold Arlen; E.Y. Harburg	Single A-side	1939	
"The Jitterbug"	July 28, 1939	Judy Garland, Harold Arlen, Bud Lyon, and Garney Bell with Victor Young and His Orchestra	Harold Arlen; E.Y. Harburg	"Over the Rainbow" B-side	1939	
"In Between"	July 28, 1939	Judy Garland with Victor Young and His Orchestra	Roger Edens	Single A-side	1940	
"Sweet Sixteen"	July 28, 1939	Judy Garland with Victor Young and His Orchestra	Roger Edens	"In Between" B-side	1940	
"Zing! Went the Strings of My Heart"	July 29, 1939	Judy Garland with Victor Young and His Orchestra	James F. Hanley	Single A-side	1940	
"I'm Just Wild About Harry"	July 29, 1939	Judy Garland with Victor Young and His Orchestra	Noble Sissle; Eubie Blake	"Zing Went the Strings of My Heart" U.K. B-side	1940	
"Fascinating Rhythm"	July 29, 1939	Judy Garland with Victor Young and His Orchestra	George Gershwin; Ira Gershwin	"Zing Went the Strings of My Heart" U.K. B-side	1943	
"Oceans Apart"	October 16, 1939	Judy Garland with Victor Young and His Orchestra	Mickey Rooney; Sidney Miller	Single A-side	1940	
"Embraceable You"	October 16, 1939	Judy Garland with Victor Young and His Orchestra	George Gershwin; Ira Gershwin	Single A-side	1940	
"Swanee"	October 16, 1939	Judy Garland with Victor Young and His Orchestra	George Gershwin; Irving Caesar	"Embraceable You" B-side	1940	
"Figaro"	October 16, 1939	Judy Garland with Victor Young and His Orchestra	Roger Edens	"Oceans Apart" B-side	1940	
"Figaro" (Alternate)	October 16, 1939	Judy Garland with Victor Young and His Orchestra	Roger Edens	Smilin' Through: The Singles Collection, 1936—1947	2011	
"(Can This Be) The End of the Rainbow"	April 10, 1940	Judy Garland with Orchestra directed by Bobby Sherwood	Sammy Cahn; Saul Chaplin	Single A-side	1940	
"I'm Nobody's Baby"	April 10, 1940	Judy Garland with Orchestra directed by Bobby Sherwood	Benny Davis; Milton Ager; Lester Santly	"Bud's Won't Bud" B-side	1940	
"Buds Won't Bud"	April 10, 1940	Judy Garland with Orchestra directed by Bobby Sherwood	Harold Arlen; E.Y. Harburg	Single A-side	1940	
"Wearing of the Green"	April 10, 1940	Judy Garland with Orchestra directed by Bobby Sherwood	Traditional	"Friendship" B-side	1940	
"Friendship"	April 15, 1940	Judy Garland and Johnny Mercer with Victor Young and His Orchestra	Cole Porter	Single A-side	1940	
"Friendship" (Alternate)	April 15, 1940	Judy Garland and Johnny Mercer with Victor Young and His Orchestra	Cole Porter	Smilin' Through: The Singles Collection, 1936—1947	2011	
"I'm Always Chasing Rainbows"	December 18, 1940	Judy Garland with Orchestra directed by David Rose	Harry Carroll; Joseph McCarthy	"Our Love Affair" B-side	1941	
"I'm Always Chasing Rainbows" (Alternate)	December 18, 1940	Judy Garland with Orchestra directed by David Rose	Harry Carroll; Joseph McCarthy	Smilin' Through: The Singles Collection, 1936—1947	2011	
"Our Love Affair"	December 18, 1940	Judy Garland with Orchestra directed by David Rose	Roger Edens; Arthur Freed	Single A-side	1941	
"A Pretty Girl Milking Her Cow"	December 18, 1940	Judy Garland with Orchestra directed by David Rose	Traditional arr. by Roger Edens	"It's a Great Day for the Irish" B-side	1941	
"It's a Great Day for the Irish"	December 18, 1940	Judy Garland with Orchestra directed by David Rose	Roger Edens	Single A-side	1941	
"The Birthday of a King"	July 20, 1941	Judy Garland with Orchestra directed by David Rose	William Harold Neidlinger	Single A-side	1941	
"The Star of the East"	July 20, 1941	Judy Garland with Orchestra directed by David Rose	Amanda Kennedy; George Cooper	"The Birthday of a King" B-side	1941	
"How About You?"	October 24, 1941	Judy Garland with Orchestra directed by David Rose	Burton Lane; Ralph Freed	Single A-side	1941	
"Blues in the Night"	October 24, 1941	Judy Garland with Orchestra directed by David Rose	Harold Arlen; Johnny Mercer	Single A-side	1941	
"Blues in the Night" (Alternate)	October 24, 1941	Judy Garland with Orchestra directed by David Rose	Harold Arlen; Johnny Mercer	Smilin' Through: The Singles Collection, 1936—1947	2011	
"F.D.R. Jones"	October 24, 1941	Judy Garland with Orchestra directed by David Rose	Harold Rome	"How About You" B-side	1941	
"The Last Call for Love"	April 3, 1942	Judy Garland with Orchestra directed by David Rose	Burton Lane; E.Y. Harburg; Margaret Cummings	"Poor You" B-side	1942	
"The Last Call for Love" (Alternate)	April 3, 1942	Judy Garland with Orchestra directed by David Rose	Burton Lane; E.Y. Harburg; Margaret Cummings	Smilin' Through: The Singles Collection, 1936—1947	2011	
"Poor You"	April 3, 1942	Judy Garland with Orchestra directed by David Rose	Burton Lane; E.Y. Harburg	Single A-side	1942	
"Poor You" (Alternate)	April 3, 1942	Judy Garland with Orchestra directed by David Rose	Burton Lane; E.Y. Harburg	Smilin' Through: The Singles Collection, 1936—1947	2011	
"On the Sunny Side of the Street"	April 3, 1942	Judy Garland with Orchestra directed by David Rose	Jimmy McHugh; Dorothy Fields	"I Never Knew (I Could Love Anybody Like I'm Loving You)" B-side	1943	
"Poor Little Rich Girl"	April 3, 1942	Judy Garland with Orchestra directed by David Rose	Noël Coward	"That Old Black Magic" B-side	1943	
"For Me and My Gal"	July 26, 1942	Judy Garland and Gene Kelly with Orchestra directed by David Rose	George W. Meyer; Edgar Leslie; E. Ray Goetz	Single A-side	1943	
"When You Wore a Tulip (And I Wore a Big Red Rose)"	July 26, 1942	Judy Garland and Gene Kelly with Orchestra directed by David Rose	Percy Wenrich; Jack Mahoney	"For Me and My Gal" B-side	1943	
"That Old Black Magic"	July 26, 1942	Judy Garland with Orchestra directed by David Rose	Harold Arlen; Johnny Mercer	Single A-side	1943	
"I Never Knew (I Could Love Anybody Like I'm Loving You)"	July 26, 1942	Judy Garland with Orchestra directed by David Rose	Tom Pitts; Raymond Egan; Roy Marsh; Paul Whiteman	Single A-side	1943	
"But Not for Me"	November 2, 1943	Judy Garland with Georgie Stoll and His Orchestra	George Gershwin; Ira Gershwin	Single A-side	1944	
"I Got Rhythm"	November 2, 1943	Judy Garland with Georgie Stoll and His Orchestra	George Gershwin; Ira Gershwin	"Bidin' My Time" B-side	1944	
"I Got Rhythm" (Alternate)	November 2, 1943	Judy Garland with Georgie Stoll and His Orchestra	George Gershwin; Ira Gershwin	Smilin' Through: The Singles Collection, 1936—1947	2011	
"Embraceable You"	November 2, 1943	Judy Garland with Georgie Stoll and His Orchestra	George Gershwin; Ira Gershwin	Single A-side	1944	
"Embraceable You" (Alternate)	November 2, 1943	Judy Garland with Georgie Stoll and His Orchestra	George Gershwin; Ira Gershwin	Smilin' Through: The Singles Collection, 1936—1947	2011	
"Could You Use Me"	November 2, 1943	Judy Garland and Mickey Rooney with Georgie Stoll and His Orchestra	George Gershwin; Ira Gershwin	"Embraceable You" B-side	1944	
"Bidin' My Time"	November 2, 1943	Judy Garland featuring the Leo Diamond Harmonica Quintet with Georgie Stoll and His Orchestra	George Gershwin; Ira Gershwin	Single A-side	1944	
"No Love, No Nothin'"	December 22, 1943	Judy Garland with Georgie Stoll and His Orchestra	Harry Warren; Leo Robin	Single A-side	1944	
"A Journey to a Star"	December 22, 1943	Judy Garland with Georgie Stoll and His Orchestra	Harry Warren; Leo Robin	"No Love, No Nothin'" B-side	1944	
"The Boy Next Door"	April 20, 1944	Judy Garland with Georgie Stoll and His Orchestra	Hugh Martin; Ralph Blane	"Have Yourself a Merry Little Christmas" B-side	1944	
"Boys and Girls Like You and Me"	April 20, 1944	Judy Garland with Georgie Stoll and His Orchestra	Richard Rodgers; Oscar Hammerstein II	"The Trolley Song'" B-side	1944	
"Have Yourself a Merry Little Christmas"	April 20, 1944	Judy Garland with Georgie Stoll and His Orchestra	Hugh Martin; Ralph Blane	Single A-side	1944	
"Have Yourself a Merry Little Christmas" (Alternate)	April 20, 1944	Judy Garland with Georgie Stoll and His Orchestra	Hugh Martin; Ralph Blane	Smilin' Through: The Singles Collection, 1936—1947	2011	
"The Trolley Song"	April 21, 1944	Judy Garland with Georgie Stoll and His Orchestra	Hugh Martin; Ralph Blane	Single A-side	2011	
"Skip to My Lou"	April 21, 1944	Judy Garland with Georgie Stoll and His Orchestra	Hugh Martin; Ralph Blane	"Meet Me in St. Louis" B-side	1944	
"Meet Me in St. Louis, Louis"	April 21, 1944	Judy Garland with Georgie Stoll and His Orchestra	Kerry Mills; Andrew B. Sterling	Single A-side	1944	
"You've Got Me Where You Want Me"	July 31, 1944	Judy Garland and Bing Crosby with Orchestra directed by Joseph Lilley	Harry Warren; Johnny Mercer	"Yah-Ta-Ta, Yah-Ta-Ta (Talk, Talk, Talk)" B-side	1945	
"Mine"	July 31, 1944	Judy Garland and Bing Crosby with Orchestra directed by Joseph Lilley	George Gershwin; Ira Gershwin	"Connecticut" B-side	1947	
"Mine" (Alternate)	July 31, 1944	Judy Garland and Bing Crosby with Orchestra directed by Joseph Lilley	George Gershwin; Ira Gershwin	—N/a	—N/a	
"This Heart of Mine"	January 26, 1945	Judy Garland with Victor Young and His Orchestra	Harry Warren; Arthur Freed	Single A-side	1945	
"This Heart of Mine" (Alternate)	January 26, 1945	Judy Garland with Victor Young and His Orchestra	Harry Warren; Arthur Freed	Smilin' Through: The Singles Collection, 1936—1947	2011	
"Love"	January 26, 1945	Judy Garland with Victor Young and His Orchestra	Hugh Martin; Ralph Blane	"This Heart of Mine" B-side	1945	
"Connecticut"	March 9, 1945	Judy Garland and Bing Crosby with Orchestra directed by Joseph Lilley	Hugh Martin; Ralph Blane	Single A-side	1947	
"Connecticut" (Alternate)	March 9, 1945	Judy Garland and Bing Crosby with Orchestra directed by Joseph Lilley	Hugh Martin; Ralph Blane	Smilin' Through: The Singles Collection, 1936—1947	2011	
"Yah-Ta-Ta, Yah-Ta-Ta (Talk, Talk, Talk)"	March 9, 1945	Judy Garland and Bing Crosby with Orchestra directed by Joseph Lilley	Jimmy Van Heusen; Johnny Burke	Single A-side	1945	
"Yah-Ta-Ta, Yah-Ta-Ta (Talk, Talk, Talk)" (Alternate 1)	March 9, 1945	Judy Garland and Bing Crosby with Orchestra directed by Joseph Lilley	Jimmy Van Heusen; Johnny Burke	Smilin' Through: The Singles Collection, 1936—1947	2011	
"Yah-Ta-Ta, Yah-Ta-Ta (Talk, Talk, Talk)" (Alternate 2)	March 9, 1945	Judy Garland and Bing Crosby with Orchestra directed by Joseph Lilley	Jimmy Van Heusen; Johnny Burke	—N/a	—N/a	
"March of the Doagies"	May 14, 1945	Judy Garland and Kenny Baker with the Kay Thompson Chorus and Orchestra directed by Lennie Hayton	Harry Warren; Johnny Mercer	Smilin' Through: The Singles Collection, 1936—1947	2011	
"Swing Your Partner Round and Round"	May 14, 1945	Judy Garland and Kenny Baker with the Kay Thompson Chorus and Orchestra directed by Lennie Hayton	Harry Warren; Johnny Mercer	"Wait and See" B-side	1945	
"On the Atchison, Topeka and the Santa Fe" (Alternate)	May 15, 1945	Judy Garland with the Kay Thompson Chorus and Orchestra directed by Lennie Hayton	Harry Warren; Johnny Mercer; Kay Thompson; Ralph Blane	Smilin' Through: The Singles Collection, 1936—1947	2011	
"On the Atchison, Topeka and the Santa Fe"	July 7, 1945	Judy Garland and the Merry Macs with Orchestra directed by Lyn Murray	Harry Warren; Johnny Mercer	Single A-side	1945	
"If I Had You"	July 7, 1945	Judy Garland and the Merry Macs with Orchestra directed by Lyn Murray	Jimmy Campbell; Reg Connelly; Ted Shapiro	"On the Atchison, Topeka and the Santa Fe" B-side	1945	
"If I Had You" (Alternate)	July 7, 1945	Judy Garland and the Merry Macs with Orchestra directed by Lyn Murray	Jimmy Campbell; Reg Connelly; Ted Shapiro	Smilin' Through: The Singles Collection, 1936—1947	2011	
"You'll Never Walk Alone"	July 10, 1945	Judy Garland with Orchestra directed by Lyn Murray	Richard Rodgers; Oscar Hammerstein II	"Smilin' Through" B-side	1946	
"Smilin' Through"	July 10, 1945	Judy Garland with Orchestra directed by Lyn Murray	Arthur A. Penn	Single A-side	1946	
"It's a Great Big World"	September 7, 1945	Judy Garland, Virginia O'Brien, and Betty Russell with Chorus and Orchestra directed by Lennie Hayton	Harry Warren; Johnny Mercer	Single A-side	1945	
"In the Valley (Where the Evening Sun Goes Down)"	September 7, 1945	Judy Garland with Chorus and Orchestra directed by Lennie Hayton	Harry Warren; Johnny Mercer	"On the Atchison, Topeka and the Santa Fe" B-side	1945	
"On the Atchison, Topeka and the Santa Fe"	September 10, 1945	Judy Garland with Chorus and Orchestra directed by Lennie Hayton	Harry Warren; Johnny Mercer	Single A-side	1945	
"Aren't You Kind of Glad We Did?"	September 11, 1946	Judy Garland and Dick Haymes with Gordon Jenkins and His Orchestra	George Gershwin; Ira Gershwin	"For You, for Me, Forevermore" B-side	1946	
"For You, for Me, Forevermore"	September 11, 1946	Judy Garland and Dick Haymes with Gordon Jenkins and His Orchestra	George Gershwin; Ira Gershwin	Single A-side	1946	
"Changing My Tune"	September 11, 1946	Judy Garland and Dick Haymes with Gordon Jenkins and His Orchestra	George Gershwin; Ira Gershwin	Single A-side	1946	
"Don't Tell Me That Story"	October 1, 1946	Judy Garland with Gordon Jenkins and His Orchestra	Joseph Lilley	"There Is No Breeze (To Cool the Flame of Love)" B-side	1946	
"Don't Tell Me That Story" (Alternate)	October 1, 1946	Judy Garland with Gordon Jenkins and His Orchestra	Joseph Lilley	Smilin' Through: The Singles Collection, 1936—1947	2011	
"There Is No Breeze (To Cool the Flame of Love)"	October 1, 1946	Judy Garland with Gordon Jenkins and His Orchestra	Alex Alstone; Dorothy Dick	Single A-side	1946	
"Nothing But You"	November 15, 1947	Judy Garland with two-piano accompaniment by Eadie Griffith and Rack Godwin	Richard Rodgers; Lorenz Hart	"I Wish I Were in Love Again" B-side	1947	
"I Wish I Were in Love Again"	November 15, 1947	Judy Garland with two-piano accompaniment by Eadie Griffith and Rack Godwin	Richard Rodgers; Lorenz Hart	Single A-side	1947	
"I Wish I Were in Love Again" (Alternate)	November 15, 1947	Judy Garland with two-piano accompaniment by Eadie Griffith and Rack Godwin	Richard Rodgers; Lorenz Hart	Smilin' Through: The Singles Collection, 1936—1947	2011	
"Falling in Love with Love"	November 15, 1947	Judy Garland with two-piano accompaniment by Eadie Griffith and Rack Godwin	Richard Rodgers; Lorenz Hart	Smilin' Through: The Singles Collection, 1936—1947	2011	

== Columbia recordings (1953) ==
Title	Recorded	Artist(s)	Writer(s)	Original release	Year	Ref
"Send My Baby Back to Me"	April 3, 1953	Judy Garland with Paul Weston and His Orchestra	Bob Hilliard; Milton Delugg	Single A-side	1953	
"Heartbroken"	April 3, 1953	Judy Garland with Paul Weston and His Orchestra	Phil Springer; Fred Ebb	'"Go Home, Joe" B-side	1953	
"Without a Memory"	April 3, 1953	Judy Garland with Paul Weston and His Orchestra	Jessie Mae Robinson	"Send My Baby Back to Me" B-side	1953	
"Go Home, Joe"	April 3, 1953	Judy Garland with Paul Weston and His Orchestra	Irving Gordon	Single A-side	1953	

== Capitol recordings (1955–1964) ==
Date recorded	Title	Writer(s)	Release	Ref
1955-08-25	"Rock-a-Bye Your Baby with a Dixie Melody"	Jean Schwartz, Sam M. Lewis, Joe Young	Miss Show Business (1955)	
1955-08-25	"A Pretty Girl Milking Her Cow"	Traditional, Thomas Moore, Roger Edens	Miss Show Business (1955)	
1955-08-25	"After You've Gone"	Henry Creamer, Turner Layton	Miss Show Business (1955)	
1955-08-25	"Over the Rainbow"	Harold Arlen, E.Y. Harburg	Miss Show Business (1955)	
1955-08-25	Medley: a) "This Is the Time of the Evening" b) "While We're Young"	a) Leonar Gershe, Morty Palitz b) William Engvick, Alec Wilder	Miss Show Business (1955)	
1955-08-25	Judy's Olio Medley: a) "You Made Me Love You" b) "For Me and My Gal" c) "The Boy Next Door" d) "The Trolley Song"	a) James V. Monaco, Joseph McCarthy b) George W. Meyer, Edgar Leslie, E. Ray Goetz c) Hugh Martin, Ralph Blane d) Hugh Martin, Ralph Blane	Miss Show Business (1955)	
1955-08-25	Judy at the Palace Medley: a) "You Haven't Lived Until You've Played the Palace" b) "Shine On, Harvest Moon" c) "My Man" d) "Some of These Days" e) "I Don't Care"	a) Charles Gaynor b) Nora Bayes, Jack Norworth c) Albert Willemetz, Jacques Charles, Channing Pollock, Maurice Yvain d) Shelton Brooks e) Jean Lenox, Harry O. Sutton	Miss Show Business (1955)	
1955-08-29	"Carolina in the Morning"	Walter Donaldson, Gus Kahn	Miss Show Business (1955)	
1955-08-30	"Danny Boy"	Frederic Weatherly	Miss Show Business (1955)	
1955-08-30	"On the Atchison, Topeka and the Santa Fe"	Harry Warren, Johnny Mercer	This recording has not survived.	
1955-09-01	"Happiness Is a Thing Called Joe"	Harold Arlen, E. Y. Harburg	Miss Show Business (1955)	
1956-03-19	"Dirty Hands, Dirty Face"	James V. Monaco, Al Jolson, Clarke, Leslie	Judy (1956)	
1956-03-19	"April Showers"	Louis Silvers, Buddy DeSylva	Judy (1956)	
1956-03-19	"I Feel a Song Coming On"	Dorothy Fields, Jimmy McHugh, George Oppenheimer	Judy (1956)	
1956-03-19	"Maybe I'll Come Back"	Charles L. Cooke, Howard C. Jeffrey	Judy (1956)	
1956-03-26	"I'm Old Fashioned"	Jerome Kern, Johnny Mercer	Judy (1956)	
1956-03-26	"Just Imagine"	Ray Henderson, Lew Brown, Buddy DeSylva	Judy (1956)	
1956-03-26	"Memories of You"	Eubie Blake, Andy Razaf	Judy (1956)	
1956-03-27	"Lucky Day"	Ray Henderson, Lew Brown, Buddy DeSylva	Judy (1956)	
1956-03-31	"Come Rain or Come Shine"	Harold Arlen, Johnny Mercer	Judy (1956)	
1956-03-31	"Life Is Just a Bowl of Cherries"	Ray Henderson, Lew Brown	Judy (1956)	
1956-03-31	"Last Night When We Were Young"	Harold Arlen, E.Y. Harburg	Judy (1956)	
1956-03-31	"Any Place I Hang My Hat Is Home"	Harold Arlen, Johnny Mercer	Judy (1956)	
1957-02-06	"Little Girl Blue"	Richard Rodgers, Lorenz Hart	Alone (1957)	
1957-02-06	"I Get the Blues When It Rains"	Bruce Klauber, Harry Stoddard	Alone (1957)	
1957-02-06	"How About Me?"	Irving Berlin	Alone (1957)	
1957-02-06	"Me and My Shadow"	Dave Dreyer, Al Jolson, Billy Rose	Alone (1957)	
1957-02-22	"Mean to Me"	Fred E. Ahlert, Roy Turk	Alone (1957)	
1957-02-22	"By Myself"	Howard Dietz, Arthur Schwartz	Alone (1957)	
1957-02-22	"Blue Prelude"	Joe Bishop, Gordon Jenkins	Alone (1957)	
1957-03-06	"Then You've Never Been Blue"	Ted Fio Rito, Sam M. Lewis, Frances Langford, Joe Young	Alone (1957)	
1957-03-06	"I Gotta Right to Sing the Blues"	Harold Arlen, Ted Koehler	Alone (1957)	
1957-03-06	"Happy New Year"	Gordon Jenkins	Alone (1957)	
1957-03-06	"Among My Souvenirs"	Edgar Leslie, Horatio Nicholls	Alone (1957)	
1957-03-06	"Just a Memory"	Ray Henderson, Lew Brown, Buddy DeSylva	Alone (1957)	
1957-10-11	"It's So Lovely to Be Back in London"	Roger Edens	Special single release (1957)	
1958-05-19	"Day In, Day Out"	Rube Bloom, Johnny Mercer	Judy in Love (1958)	
1958-05-19	"This Is It"	Dorothy Fields, Arthur Schwartz	Judy in Love (1958)	
1958-05-19	"Zing! Went the Strings of My Heart"	James F. Hanley	Judy in Love (1958)	
1958-05-26	"I Hadn't Anyone Till You"	Ray Noble	Judy in Love (1958)	
1958-05-26	"More Than You Know"	Edward Eliscu, Billy Rose, Vincent Youmans	Judy in Love (1958)	
1958-05-26	"I'm Confessin' (That I Love You)"	Doc Daugherty, Al J. Neiburg, Ellis Reynolds	Judy in Love (1958)	
1958-05-26	"I Can't Give You Anything But Love"	Dorothy Fields, Jimmy McHugh	Judy in Love (1958)	
1958-06-17	"Do It Again"	Buddy DeSylva, George Gershwin	Judy in Love (1958)	
1958-06-17	"Do I Love You?"	Cole Porter	Judy in Love (1958)	
1958-06-17	"I Am Loved"	Cole Porter	Judy in Love (1958)	
1958-06-17	"I Concentrate on You"	Cole Porter	Judy in Love (1958)	
1959-01-15	"Beautiful Trouble"	Gordon Jenkins	The Letter (1959)	
1959-01-15	"Love in the Village"	Gordon Jenkins	The Letter (1959)	
1959-01-15	"The Worst Kind of Man"	Gordon Jenkins	The Letter (1959)	
1959-01-15	"That's All There Is, There Isn't Any More"	Gordon Jenkins	The Letter (1959)	
1959-01-15	"Love in Central Park"	Gordon Jenkins	The Letter (1959)	
1959-01-15	"The Red Balloon"	Gordon Jenkins	The Letter (1959)	
1959-01-15	"The Fight"	Gordon Jenkins	The Letter (1959)	
1959-01-15	"At the Stroke of Midnight"	Gordon Jenkins	The Letter (1959)	
1959-01-15	"Come Back"	Gordon Jenkins	The Letter (1959)	
1960-06-08	"If I Love Again"	Jack Murray, Ben Oakland	That's Entertainment! (1960)	
1960-06-08	"How Long Has This Been Going On?"	George Gershwin, Ira Gershwin	That's Entertainment! (1960)	
1960-06-08	"It Never Was You"	Maxwell Anderson, Kurt Weill	That's Entertainment! (1960)	
1960-06-08	"Yes"	Dory Previn, André Previn	That's Entertainment! (1960)	
1960-06-09	"Who Cares? (As Long as You Care for Me)"	George Gershwin, Ira Gershwin	That's Entertainment! (1960)	
1960-06-09	"Puttin' on the Ritz"	Irving Berlin	That's Entertainment! (1960)	
1960-06-09	"Down with Love"	Harold Arlen, E.Y. Harburg	That's Entertainment! (1960)	
1960-06-09	"Just You, Just Me"	Jesse Greer, Raymond Klages	That's Entertainment! (1960)	
1960-06-17	"That's Entertainment!"	Howard Dietz, Arthur Schwartz	That's Entertainment! (1960)	
1960-06-17	"Old Devil Moon"	E.Y. Harburg, Burton Lane	That's Entertainment! (1960)	
1960-06-17	"I've Confessed to the Breeze (I Love You)"	Otto Harbach, Vincent Youmans	That's Entertainment! (1960)	
1960-06-17	"Alone Together"	Howard Dietz, Arthur Schwartz	That's Entertainment! (1960)	
1960-08-02	"Chicago"	Fred Fisher	Judy in London (1972)	
1960-08-02	"Do It Again"	George Gershwin, Buddy DeSylva	Judy in London (1972)	
1960-08-02	"Lucky Day"	Ray Henderson, Lew Brown, Buddy DeSylva	Judy in London (1972)	
1960-08-02	"Stormy Weather"	Harold Arlen, Ted Koehler	Judy in London (1972)	
1960-08-03	"I Happen to Like New York"	Cole Porter	Judy in London (1972)	
1960-08-03	"Swanee"	George Gershwin, Irving Caesar	Judy in London (1972)	
1960-08-03	"You'll Never Walk Alone"	Richard Rodgers, Oscar Hammerstein II	Judy in London (1972)	
1960-08-03	"Why Was I Born?"	Jerome Kern, Oscar Hammerstein II	Judy in London (1972)	
1960-08-04	"The Man That Got Away"	Harold Arlen, Ira Gershwin	Judy in London (1972)	
1960-08-04	"Come Rain or Come Shine"	Harold Arlen, Johnny Mercer	Judy in London (1972)	
1960-08-04	"San Francisco"	Bronislaw Kaper, Walter Jurmann, Gus Kahn	Judy in London (1972)	
1960-08-04	"Over the Rainbow"	Harold Arlen, E.Y. Harburg	Judy in London (1972)	
1960-08-05	Judy's Olio Medley: a) "You Made Me Love You" b) "For Me and My Gal" c) "The Trolley Song"	a) James V. Monaco, Joseph McCarthy b) George W. Meyer, Edgar Leslie, E. Ray Goetz c) Hugh Martin, Ralph Blane	Judy in London (1972)	
1960-08-05	"You Go to My Head"	J. Fred Coots, Haven Gillespie	Judy in London (1972)	
1960-08-05	"Happiness Is a Thing Called Joe"	Harold Arlen, E.Y. Harburg	Judy in London (1972)	
1960-08-05	"Rock-a-Bye Your Baby with a Dixie Melody"	Jean Schwartz, Sam M. Lewis, Joe Young	Judy in London (1972)	
1960-08-08	Judy at the Palace Medley: a) "You Haven't Lived Until You've Played the Palace" b) "Shine On, Harvest Moon" c) "My Man" d) "Some of These Days" e) "I Don't Care"	a) Charles Gaynor b) Nora Bayes, Jack Norworth c) Albert Willemetz, Jacques Charles, Channing Pollock, Maurice Yvain d) Shelton Brooks e) Jean Lenox, Harry O. Sutton	Judy in London (1972)	
1960-08-08	"I Can't Give You Anything But Love"	Dorothy Fields, Jimmy McHugh	Judy in London (1972)	
1960-08-08	"After You've Gone"	Henry Creamer, Turner Layton	Judy in London (1972)	
1960-08-08	"It's a Great Day for the Irish"	Roger Edens	Judy in London (1972)	
1961-10-13	"Comes Once in a Lifetime"	Jule Styne, Betty Comden, Adolph Green	Single A-side (1961)	
1961-10-13	"Sweet Danger"	Robert Wright, George Forrest	"Comes Once in a Lifetime" B-side (1961)	
1964-08-06	"The Land of Promises"	Lionel Bart	Lionel Bart's "Maggie May" (1964)	
1964-08-06	"It's Yourself"	Lionel Bart	Lionel Bart's "Maggie May" (1964)	
1964-08-12	"There's Only One Union"	Lionel Bart	Lionel Bart's "Maggie May" (1964)	
1964-08-12	"Maggie, Maggie May"	Lionel Bart	Lionel Bart's "Maggie May" (1964)	

== The Judy Garland Show recordings (1963–1964) ==
Date recorded	Title	Writer(s)	Episode (air date)	Guest performers / Notes	Ref.
06/24/1963	"Sunny Side Up"	Buddy DeSylva, Lew Brown, Ray Henderson	Show #1 (Outtake)	Deleted before airing.	
06/24/1963	"When the Sun Comes Out"	Harold Arlen, Ted Koehler	Show #1 (12/08/1963)		
06/24/1963	"I Believe in You"	Frank Loesser	Show #1 (Outtake)	Jerry Van Dyke / Deleted before airing.	
06/24/1963	"You're So Right for Me"	Jay Livingston, Ray Evans	Show #1 (12/08/1963)	Mickey Rooney	
06/24/1963	"You're So Right for Me (Reprise)"	Jay Livingston, Ray Evans	Show #1 (12/08/1963)	Mickey Rooney	
06/24/1963	"Too Late Now"	Alan Jay Lerner, Burton Lane	Show #1 (12/08/1963)		
06/24/1963	"Who Cares? (As Long as You Care for Me)"	George Gershwin, Ira Gershwin	Show #1 (12/08/1963)		
06/24/1963	"Ol' Man River"	Jerome Kern, Oscar Hammerstein II	Show #1 (12/08/1963)		
06/24/1963	"Maybe I'll Come Back"	Charles L. Cooke, Howard C. Jeffrey	Show #1 (12/08/1963)	"President Coolidge is a cousin of mine."	
07/07/1963	Medley: a) "I Hear Music" b) "The Sweetest Sounds" c) "Strike Up the Band"	a) Burton Lane, Frank Loesser b) Richard Rodgers c) George Gershwin, Ira Gershwin	Show #2 (11/10/1963)	Count Basie and His Orchestra	
07/07/1963	"Memories of You"	Andy Razaf, Eubie Blake	Show #2 (11/10/1963)	Count Basie and His Orchestra	
07/07/1963	Count Basie Medley: a) "One O'Clock Jump" b) "I Can't Stop Loving You" c) "I've Got My Love to Keep Me Warm" d) "Don't Dream of Anybody But Me" e) "April in Paris"	a) Count Basie b) Don Gibson c) Irving Berlin d) Bart Howard, Neal Hefti e) Vernon Duke, E.Y. Harburg	Show #2 (11/10/1963)	Mel Tormé & Count Basie and His Orchestra	
07/07/1963	"A Cottage for Sale"	Willard Robison, Larry Conley	Show #2 (11/10/1963)		
07/07/1963	"Hey, Look Me Over"	Carolyn Leigh, Cy Coleman	Show #2 (11/10/1963)		
07/07/1963	"Maybe I'll Come Back"	Charles L. Cooke, Howard C. Jeffrey	Show #2 (11/10/1963)	"Mary Miles Minter is a cousin of mine."	
07/16/1963	"Liza (All the Clouds'll Roll Away)"	George Gershwin, Ira Gershwin, Gus Kahn	Show #3 (11/17/1963)		
07/16/1963	"Come Rain or Come Shine"	Harold Arlen, Johnny Mercer	Show #3 (11/17/1963)		
07/16/1963	"Together (Wherever We Go)"	Jule Styne, Stephen Sondheim	Show #3 (11/17/1963)	Liza Minnelli	
07/16/1963	Judy Garland and Liza Minnelli Medley: a) "We Could Make Such Beautiful Music Together" b) "The Best Is Yet to Come" c) "Bye, Bye Baby" d) "Bob White (Whatcha Gonna Swing Tonight)"	a) Robert Sour, Henry Manners b) Carolyn Leigh, Cy Coleman c) Leo Robin, Jule Stone d) Johnny Mercer, Bernie Hanighen	Show #3 (11/17/1963)	Liza Minnelli	
07/16/1963	"As Long as He Needs Me"	Lionel Bart	Show #3 (11/17/1963)		
07/16/1963	Medley: a) "Let Me Entertain You" b) "Two Lost Souls"	a) Jule Styne, Stephen Sondheim b) Richard Adler, Jerry Ross	Show #3 (11/17/1963)	Liza Minnelli	
07/16/1963	"Maybe I'll Come Back"	Charles L. Cooke, Howard C. Jeffrey	Show #3 (11/17/1963)	Liza Minnelli / "Liza Minnelli is a cousin of mine."	
07/23/1963	"Day In, Day Out"	Rube Bloom, Johnny Mercer	Show #4 (10/13/1963)	Lena Horne	
07/23/1963	"A Foggy Day (In London Town)"	George Gershwin, Ira Gershwin	Show #4 (10/13/1963)		
07/23/1963	Judy Sings Lena Sings Judy Medley: a) "Honeysuckle Rose" b) "Meet Me in St. Louis, Louis" c) "'Deed I Do" d) "Zing! Went the Strings of My Heart" e) "It's All Right with Me" f) "The Trolley Song" g) "Love"	a) Fats Waller, Andy Razaf b) Kerry Mills, Andrew B. Sterling c) Fred Rose, Walter Hirsch d) James F. Hanley e) Cole Porter f) Hugh Martin, Ralph Blane g) Hugh Martin, Ralph Blane	Show #4 (10/13/1963)	Lena Horne	
07/23/1963	"Mad Dogs and Englishmen"	Noël Coward	Show #4 (10/13/1963)	Lena Horne & Terry-Thomas	
07/23/1963	"The Man That Got Away"	Harold Arlen, Ira Gershwin	Show #4 (10/13/1963)		
07/23/1963	"Maybe I'll Come Back"	Charles L. Cooke, Howard C. Jeffrey	Show #4 (10/13/1963)	"Bela Lugosi is a cousin of mine."	
07/30/1963	"Yes, Indeed!"	Sy Oliver	Show #5 (12/15/1963)	Tony Bennett & Dick Shawn	
07/30/1963	Judy Garland & Tony Bennett Medley: a) "Night Train" b) "Lullaby of Broadway" c) "Carolina in the Morning" d) "Kansas City" e) When the Midnight Choo-Choo Leaves for Alabam'" f) "I Left My Heart in San Francisco"	a) Oscar Washington, Lewis P. Simpkins, Jimmy Forrest b) Harry Warren, Al Dubin c) Gus Kahn, Walter Donaldson d) Jerry Leiber, Mike Stoller e) Irving Berlin f) George Cory, Douglass Cross	Show #5 (12/15/1963)	Tony Bennett	
07/30/1963	"My Buddy"	Gus Kahn, Walter Donaldson	Show #5 (12/15/1963)	Dick Shawn	
07/30/1963	"Stormy Weather"	Harold Arlen, Ted Koehler	Show #5 (12/15/1963)		
07/30/1963	"Maybe I'll Come Back"	Charles L. Cooke, Howard C. Jeffrey	Show #5 (12/15/1963)	"Baby Face Nelson is a cousin of mine."	
07/30/1963	"If Love Were All"	Noël Coward	Show #5 (12/15/1963)		
09/13/1963	"Life Is Just a Bowl of Cherries"	Lew Brown, Ray Henderson	Show #6 (10/27/1963)		
09/13/1963	"Happiness Is a Thing Called Joe"	E.Y. Harburg, Harold Arlen	Show #6 (10/27/1963)		
09/13/1963	"Be My Guest"	Mel Tormé	Show #6 (10/27/1963)	Steve Lawrence	
09/13/1963	"The Doodlin' Song"	Carolyn Leigh, Cy Coleman	Show #6 (10/27/1963)	June Allyson	
09/13/1963	"Just Imagine"	B.G. DeSylva, Lew Brown, Ray Henderson,	Show #6 (10/27/1963)	June Allyson	
09/13/1963	MGM Medley: a) "Buckle Down, Winsocki" b) "(I'm in Love with You) Honey" c) "Cleopatra" d) "Thou Swell" e) "Look for the Silver Lining" f) "Till the Clouds Roll By" g) "Look for the Silver Lining"	a) Hugh Martin, Ralph Blane b) c) Joseph Kern, P.G. Wodehouse, Guy Bolton d) Richard Rodgers, Lorenz Hart e) Joseph Kern, B.G. DeSylva f) Joseph Kern, P.G. Wodehouse, Guy Bolton g) Joseph Kern, B.G. DeSylva	Show #6 (10/27/1963)	June Allyson & Steve Lawrence	
09/13/1963	"San Francisco"	Gus Kahn, Bronislau Kaper, Walter Jurmann	Show #6 (10/27/1963)		
09/13/1963	"Maybe I'll Come Back"	Charles L. Cooke, Howard C. Jeffrey	Show #6 (10/27/1963)	"William Paley is a cousin of mine."	
09/20/1963	"Call Me Irresponsible"	Bronislaw Kaper, Walter Jurmann, Gus Kahn	Show #7 (09/29/1963)		
09/20/1963	"Sunny Side Up"	Buddy DeSylva, Lew Brown, Ray Henderson	Show #7 (09/29/1963)	Donald O'Connor & Jerry Van Dyke	
09/20/1963	"Be My Guest"	Mel Tormé	Show #7 (09/29/1963)	Donald O'Connor	
09/20/1963	Songs We're Famous For Medley: a) "Inka Dinka Duo" b) "if You Knew Susie Like I Knew Susie" c) "My Mammy" d) "Indian Love Call" e) "Rose Marie" f) "Will You Remember (Sweetheart) g) "Stout Hearted Man" h) "Italian Street Song" i) "Indian Love Call"		Show #7 (09/29/1963)	Donald O'Connor	
09/20/1963	Fly Me to the Moon	Bart Howard	Show #7 (09/29/1963)		
09/20/1963	"The World Is Your Balloon"	E. Y. Harburg, Sammy Fain	Show #7 (09/29/1963)	Donald O'Connor & Jerry Van Dyke	
09/20/1963	Vaudeville Medley: a) "In Those Good Old Days of Vaudeville" b) "Nagasaki" c) "Yacka Hula Hickey Dula" d) "You Can Always Find a Little Sunshine at the Y.M.C.A." e) "At the Moving-Picture Ball" f) "The Old Soft Shoe"		Show #7 (09/29/1963)	Donald O'Connor	
09/20/1963	"Chicago"	Fred Fisher	Show #7 (09/29/1963)		
09/20/1963	"Maybe I'll Come Back"	Charles L. Cooke, Howard C. Jeffrey	Show #7 (09/29/1963)		
09/27/1963	"Alexander's Ragtime Band"		Show #8 (10/20/1963)		
09/27/1963	"Be My Guest"	Mel Tormé	Show #8 (10/20/1963)	George Maharis & Jack Carter	
09/27/1963	"I Wish You Love"		Show #8 (10/20/1963)		
09/27/1963	"Side by Side"		Show #8 (10/20/1963)	George Maharis	
09/27/1963	"Take Me Out to the Ball Game"		Show #8 (10/20/1963)	Leo Durocher	
09/27/1963	Country Medley:		Show #8 (10/20/1963)	George Maharis, Jack Carter, Jerry Van Dyke & the Dillards	
09/27/1963	"Swanee"		Show #8 (10/20/1963)		
09/27/1963	"Maybe I'll Come Back"		Show #8 (10/20/1963)		
10/11/1963	"I Feel a Song Coming On"	Dorothy Fields, Jimmy McHugh, George Oppenheimer	Show #1 (12/08/1963)	New opening number for Show #1, recorded to replace deleted Garland performance, "Sunny Side Up".	
11/29/1963	MGM Musical Comedy Medley: a) "Where or When?" b) "How About You?" c) "But Not for Me" d) "Fascinating Rhythm" e) "God's Country" f) "Could You Use Me?" g) "Our Love Affair" h) "How About You?"	a) Richard Rodgers, Lorenz Hart b) Burton Lane, Ralph Freed c) George Gershwin, Ira Gershwin d) George Gershwin, Ira Gershwin e) Harold Arlen, E.Y. Harburg f) George Gershwin, Ira Gershwin g) Roger Edens, Arthur Freed h) Richard Rodgers, Lorenz Hart	Show #1 (12/08/1963)	Mickey Rooney / Recorded to replace deleted Garland and Van Dyke performance, "I Believe in You", and deleted comedy sketch.	

== Radio recordings (1935–1961) ==
For a list of theatrical radio performances, see: Radio appearances

Date recorded	Title	Radio show	CD release / Notes	Ref
1935-10-26	"Broadway Rhythm"	The Shell Chateau Hour	Lost Tracks 1929–1959 (2010)	
1935-11-16	"Zing! Went the Strings of My Heart"	The Shell Chateau Hour	Lost Tracks 1929–1959 (2010)	
1936-08-06	"After You've Gone"	The Shell Chateau Hour	—N/a	
1936-08-06	"On Revival Day"	The Shell Chateau Hour	The Best of Lost Tracks 1929–1959 (2015)	
1937-01-05	"Hold That Bulldog"	Jack Oakie's College	Lost Tracks 2: 1936–1967 (2019)	
1937-01-05	"Pennies from Heaven"	Jack Oakie's College	Lost Tracks 2: 1936–1967 (2019)	
1937-04-20	"Johnny One Note"	Jack Oakie's College	Lost Tracks 2: 1936–1967 (2019)	
1937-05-04	"They Can't Take That Away from Me"	Jack Oakie's College	Lost Tracks 2: 1936–1967 (2019)	
1937-06-01	"Dinah"	Jack Oakie's College	Lost Tracks 2: 1936–1967 (2019)	
1937-09-28	"Smiles"	Jack Oakie's College	Lost Tracks 2: 1936–1967 (2019)	
1937-10-24	"(Dear Mr. Gable) You Made Me Love You"	30 Minutes in Hollywood	—N/a	
1938-04-14	"College Swing"	Good News of 1938	Lost Tracks 1929–1959 (2010)	
1938-04-14	"Crying for the Carolines"	Good News of 1938	Lost Tracks 1929–1959 (2010)	
1938-04-21	"My Heart Is Taking Lessons"	Good News of 1938	—N/a	
1938-04-21	"There's a Gold Mine in the Sky"	Good News of 1938	Lost recording	
1938-05-05	"God's Country"	Good News of 1938	Lost Tracks 1929–1959 (2010)	
1938-05-05	"Serenade"	Good News of 1938	Lost Tracks 1929–1959 (2010)	
1938-05-05	"How Deep Is the Ocean?"	Good News of 1938	Lost Tracks 1929–1959 (2010)	
1938-09-08	"Could You Pass in Love"	Maxwell House Good News of 1939	—N/a	
1938-12-14	"My Old Kentucky Home"	America Calling	Lost Tracks 1929–1959 (2010)	
1939-00-00	"Dardenella"	The Pepsodent Show with Bob Hope	Lost Tracks 1929–1959 (2010)	
1939-00-00	"Oh Johnny, Oh Johnny, Oh!"	The Pepsodent Show with Bob Hope	Lost Tracks 1929–1959 (2010)	
1939-00-00	"Ma (He's Making Eyes at Me)"	The Pepsodent Show with Bob Hope	Lost Tracks 1929–1959 (2010)	
1939-01-08	"Thanks for the Memory"	The Hollywood Screen Guild Theater	—N/a	
1939-01-08	"Shall I Sing a Melody?"	The Hollywood Screen Guild Theater	Lost Tracks 1929–1959 (2010)	
1939-03-07	"It Had to Be You"	'The Pepsodent Show with Bob Hope	—N/a	
1939-03-07	"F.D.R. Jones"	'The Pepsodent Show with Bob Hope	Lost Tracks 1929–1959 (2010)	
1939-04-06	"Sweet Sixteen"	Tune Up Time	Lost Tracks 1929–1959 (2010)	
1939-06-28	"Over the Rainbow"	Maxwell House Coffee Time	—N/a	
1939-09-24	"Good Morning" (with Mickey Rooney)	The Screen Guild Theater ("Babes in Arms")	Classic Duets (2017)	
1939-11-07	"Goody Good-Bye"	The Pepsodent Show with Bob Hope	The Best of Lost Tracks 1929–1959 (2015)	
1939-12-16	"Comes Love"	Arrowhead Springs Hotel Opening	The Best of Lost Tracks 1929–1959 (2015)	
1939-12-19	"Silent Night"	The Pepsodent Show with Bob Hope	The Best of Lost Tracks 1929–1959 (2015)	
1939-12-26	"Ding Dong! The Witch Is Dead"	The Pepsodent Show with Bob Hope	The Best of Lost Tracks 1929–1959 (2015)	
1940-00-00	"Alice Blue Gown"	The Pepsodent Show with Bob Hope	The Best of Lost Tracks 1929–1959 (2015)	
1940-00-00	"Too Romantic"	The Pepsodent Show with Bob Hope	The Best of Lost Tracks 1929–1959 (2015)	
1940-01-23	"It's a Hap, Hap, Happy Day"	The Pepsodent Show with Bob Hope	The Best of Lost Tracks 1929–1959 (2015)	
1940-02-13	"All the Things You Are"	The Pepsodent Show with Bob Hope	The Best of Lost Tracks 1929–1959 (2015)	
1940-05-07	"My Wonderful One, Let's Dance"	The Pepsodent Show with Bob Hope	The Best of Lost Tracks 1929–1959 (2015)	
1940-10-28	"Drummer Boy"	Lux Radio Theatre ("Strike Up the Band")	The Best of Lost Tracks 1929–1959 (2015)	
1940-10-28	"I Ain't Got Nobody"	Lux Radio Theatre ("Strike Up the Band")	The Best of Lost Tracks 1929–1959 (2015)	
1941-01-01	"Aude Lang Syne"	Bundles for Britain	The Best of Lost Tracks 1929–1959 (2015)	
1940-01-01	"I Hear a Rhapsody"	Bundles for Britain	The Best of Lost Tracks 1929–1959 (2015)	
1940-01-26	"Love's New Sweet Song"	Silver Theater ("Love's New Sweet Song")	—N/a	
1941-02-27	"(America) My County 'Tis of Thee"	13th Academy Awards	Lost Tracks 1929–1959 (2010)	
1941-02-27	"Chin Up! Cheerio! Carry On!"	Young America Wants to Help	Lost Tracks 1929–1959 (2010)	
1941-07-02	"Strike Up the Band"	The Treasury Hour ("Millions for Defense")	Lost Tracks 1929–1959 (2010)	
1941-09-07	"Daddy"	The Chase and Sanborn Hour	—N/a	
1941-09-07	"These Are the Things I Love"	The Chase and Sanborn Hour	—N/a	
1941-10-12	"Jim"	Silver Theatre ("Eternally Yours")	—N/a	
1941-11-17	"How About You?" (with Mickey Rooney)	Lux Radio Theatre ("Merton of the Movies")	Lost Tracks 1929–1959 (2010)	
1941-11-17	"The Peanut Vendor" (with Mickey Rooney)	Lux Radio Theatre ("Merton of the Movies")	Lost Tracks 1929–1959 (2010)	
1941-12-07	"Zing! Went the Strings of My Heart"	The Chase and Sanborn Hour	—N/a	
1941-12-23	"Abe Lincoln Had Just One Country"	The Treasury Hour ("Millions for Defense")	Lost Tracks 1929–1959 (2010)	
1942-06-18	"Minnie from Trinidad"	Command Performance #18	Lost Tracks 1929–1959 (2010)	
1942-06-21	"I Never Knew"	The Chase and Sanborn Hour	—N/a	
1942-07-28	"Over the Rainbow"	Command Performance #24	Lost Tracks 1929–1959 (2010)	
1942-10-09	"It's a Great Day for the Irish"	Command Performance #35	Lost Tracks 1929–1959 (2010)	
1942-10-09	"On the Sunny Side of the Street"	Command Performance #35	Lost Tracks 1929–1959 (2010)	
1942-10-12	"I'll Remember April"	Lux Radio Theatre ("Morning Glory")	Lost Tracks 1929–1959 (2010)	
1943-01-09	"The Joint Is Really Jumpin' Down at Carnegie Hall"	Mail Call #19	—N/a	
1943-01-09	"I Never Knew"	Mail Call #19	—N/a	
1943-03-21	"Zing! Went the Strings of My Heart"	Command Performance #58	Lost Tracks 1929–1959 (2010)	
1943-03-22	"How Ya Gonna Keep 'Em Down on the Farm?"	The Screen Guild Theater ("For Me and My Gal")	Lost Tracks 1929–1959 (2010)	
1943-03-22	"After You've Gone"	The Screen Guild Theater ("For Me and My Gal")	—N/a	
1943-04-03	"I Never Knew"	Command Performance #61	Lost Tracks 1929–1959 (2010)	
1943-04-03	"Over the Rainbow"	Command Performance #61	—N/a	
1943-05-00	"Don't Get Around Much Anymore" (with Johnny Mercer)	Personal Album #76	—N/a	
1943-05-00	"I Lost My Sugar in Salt Lake City" (with Johnny Mercer)	Personal Album #76	—N/a	
1943-05-00	"Taking a Chance on Love" (with Johnny Mercer)	Personal Album #76	—N/a	
1943-07-04	"This Is the Army, Mr. Jones"	The Pause That Refreshes on the Air	Lost Tracks 1929–1959 (2010)	
1943-07-04	"That Old Black Magic"	The Pause That Refreshes on the Air	—N/a	
1943-07-04	"Over the Rainbow"	The Pause That Refreshes on the Air	—N/a	
1943-08-28	"Embraceable You / The Man I Love" (with Bing Crosby and Jimmy Durante)	Command Performance #81	—N/a	
1943-08-28	"People Will Say We're in Love" (with Bing Crosby)	Command Performance #81	Lost Tracks 1929–1959 (2010)	
1943-08-28	"Comedy Song Medley" (with Bing Crosby)	Command Performance #81	—N/a	
1943-10-30	"Zing! Went the Strongs of My Heart"	Command Performance #91	—N/a	
1944-00-00	"Autolite Commercial" (with Dick Haymes)	Unknown	—N/a	
1944-00-00	"The Boy Next Door"	Armed Forces Radio & Television Service	Lost Tracks 1929–1959 (2010)	
1944-01-05	"Speak Low"	Mail Call #72	Lost Tracks 1929–1959 (2010)	
1944-03-05	"The Man I Love"	Command Performance #106	—N/a	
1944-03-05	"Embraceable You"	Command Performance #106	—N/a	
1944-05-17	"Can Do, Will Do (The Song of the Seabees)"	Mail Call #91	Lost Tracks 1929–1959 (2010)	
1944-05-17	"The Trolley Song"	Mail Call #91	Lost Tracks 1929–1959 (2010)	
1944-05-24	"Embraceable You" (with Frank Sinatra)	The Frank Sinatra Show	Lost Tracks 1929–1959 (2010)	
1944-06-03	"Dixieland Band"	Command Performance #122	Lost Tracks 1929–1959 (2010)	
1944-06-03	"Something to Remember You By" (with Bing Crosby)	Command Performance #122	Lost Tracks, 1929–1959 (2010)	
1944-06-04	"The Way You Look Tonight"	The Bakers of America Salute to the Armed Forces	—N/a	
1944-06-04	"Long Ago (And Far Away)"	The Bakers of America Salute to the Armed Forces	—N/a	
1944-06-04	"The Trolley Song"	The Bakers of America Salute to the Armed Forces	—N/a	
1944-07-11	"Somebody Loves Me"	Everything for the Boys	—N/a	
1944-07-11	"There's a Tavern in the Town"	Everything for the Boys	—N/a	
1944-07-15	"Long Ago (And Far Away)"	Command Performance #129	Lost Tracks 1929–1959 (2010)	
1944-08-19	"I May Be Wrong (But I Think You're Wonderful)"	Command Performance #134	Lost Tracks 1929–1959 (2010)	
1944-10-08	"Over the Checkbook"	Hollywood Democratic Committee Dinner	—N/a	
1944-10-08	"Someone to Watch Over Me"	Hollywood Democratic Committee Dinner	—N/a	
1944-10-08	"The Trolley Song"	Hollywood Democratic Committee Dinner	—N/a	
1944-11-06	"Gotta Get Out and Vote"	Democratic National Committee	—N/a	
1944-12-17	"The Trolley Song"	Philco Radio Hall of Fame	—N/a	
1944-12-17	"Have Yourself a Merry Little Christmas"	Philco Radio Hall of Fame	—N/a	
1944-12-24	"The Trolley Song"	Command Performance All-Star Christmas Show	—N/a	
1944-12-24	"O Come All Ye Faithful"	Command Performance All-Star Christmas Show	—N/a	
1944-12-24	"Silent Night" (with Dinah Shore, Ginny Simms, Virginia O'Brien, Dorothy Lamour and Frances Langford)	Command Performance All-Star Christmas Show	—N/a	
1944-12-26	"The Trolley Song"	Everything for the Boys	—N/a	
1945-01-30	"Love"	March of Dimes	—N/a	
1945-01-30	"I Wonder Who's Kissing Her Now"	March of Dimes	—N/a	
1945-02-15	"Dick Tracy in B-Flat" (with Bing Crosby, Frank Sinatra, Bob Hope and Jimmy Durante)	Command Performance #162	—N/a	
1945-10-05	"Gotta Be This or That"	The Danny Kaye Show	Lost Tracks 1929–1959 (2010)	
1945-10-05	"How Deep Is the Ocean"	The Danny Kaye Show	—N/a	
1945-10-05	"My Romance"	The Danny Kaye Show	Lost Tracks 1929–1959 (2010)	
1945-12-09	"Look for the Silver Lining"	Jerome Kern Memorial Special	—N/a	
1945-12-09	"They Didn't Believe Me"	Jerome Kern Memorial Special	—N/a	
1945-12-25	"It Came Upon a Midnight Clear"	Command Performance All-Star Christmas Show	Lost Tracks 1929–1959 (2010)	

== Live recordings (1941–1969) ==
February 24, 1952 - Palace Theatre, New York, NY
1. Chorus Intro
2. Call the Press
3. Medley:
  a) You Haven't Lived Until You've Played the Palace
  b) Shine On, Harvest Moon
  c) My Man
  d) Some of These Days
  e) I Don't Care
4. Rock-a-Bye Your Baby with a Dixie Melody
5. Medley:
  a) You Made Me Love You
  b) For Me and My Gal
  c) The Boy Next Door
  d) The Trolley Song
6. Chorus Interlude
7. Get Happy
8. A Couple of Swells
9. Love
10. A Pretty Girl Milking Her Cow
11. Liza (All the Clouds'll Roll Away)
12. After You've Gone
13. Over the Rainbow
14. Auld Lang Syne

Available on Wiley Entertainment, Ltd./BCD/MSL Partners 1998 release Judy Duets.

August 5, 1958 - Coconut Grove, Ambassador Hotel, Los Angeles, CA
1. Overture
2. When You're Smiling (The Whole World Smiles with You)
3. Day In, Day Out
4. I Can't Give You Anything But Love
5. Zing! Went the Strings of My Heart
6. Purple People Eater
7. Medley:
  a) You Made Me Love You
  b) For Me and My Gal
  c) The Trolley Song
8. Do It Again
9. When the Sun Comes Out
10. Rock-A-Bye Your Baby with a Dixie Melody
11. Over the Rainbow
12. After You've Gone
13. A Pretty Girl Milking Her Cow
14. Swanee

Originally released in 1958 by Capitol Records as Garland at the Grove.

October 28, 1960 - Olympia Theatre, Paris, France
1. Overture
2. Zing! Went the Strings of My Heart
3. Medley:
  a) You Made Me Love You
  b) For Me and My Gal
  c) The Trolley Song
4. I Can't Give You Anything But Love
5. Come Rain or Come Shine
6. San Francisco
7. The Man That Got Away
8. When You're Smiling (The Whole World Smiles With You)
9. Stormy Weather
10. You Go to My Head
11. That's Entertainment!
12. Medley:
  a) I Love Paris
  b) April in Paris
13. Rock-a-Bye Your Baby with a Dixie Melody
14. After You've Gone
15. Over the Rainbow
16. Swanee

Available on Europe 1/RTE Records 1994 release Judy Garland à Paris.

December 10, 1960 - Tuschinski Theatre, Amsterdam, Holland
1. Overture
2. When You're Smiling (The Whole World Smiles With You)
3. Medley:
  a) Almost Like Being in Love
  b) This Can't Be Love
4. Do It Again
5. You Go to My Head
6. Alone Together
7. Who Cares (As Long as You Care for Me)
8. Puttin' On the Ritz
9. How Long Has This Been Going On?
10. Just You, Just Me
11. The Man That Got Away
12. San Francisco
13. That's Entertainment!
14. I Can't Give You Anything But Love
15. Come Rain or Come Shine
16. You're Nearer
17. If Love Were All
18. A Foggy Day
19. Zing! Went the Strings of My Heart
20. Stormy Weather
21. Medley:
  a) You Made Me Love You
  b) For Me and My Gal
  c) The Trolley Song
22. Rock-a-Bye Your Baby with a Dixie Melody
23. Over the Rainbow
24. Swanee
25. It's a Great Day for the Irish
26. After You've Gone
27. Chicago
28. San Francisco

Available on First Hand Records 2012 release The Amsterdam Concert - December 1960

April 23, 1961 - Carnegie Hall, New York, NY
1. Overture
2. When You're Smiling (The Whole World Smiles With You)
3. Medley:
  a) Almost Like Being in Love
  b) This Can't Be Love
4. Do It Again
5. You Go to My Head
6. Alone Together
7. Who Cares (As Long as You Care for Me)
8. Puttin' On the Ritz
9. How Long Has This Been Going On?
10. Just You, Just Me
11. The Man That Got Away
12. San Francisco
13. That's Entertainment!
14. I Can't Give You Anything But Love
15. Come Rain or Come Shine
16. You're Nearer
17. A Foggy Day
18. If Love Were All
19. Zing! Went the Strings of My Heart
20. Stormy Weather
21. Medley:
  a) You Made Me Love You
  b) For Me and My Gal
  c) The Trolley Song
22. Rock-a-Bye Your Baby with a Dixie Melody
23. Over the Rainbow
24. Swanee
25. After You've Gone
26. Chicago

Originally released by Capitol Records in 1961 as Judy at Carnegie Hall.

April 25, 1962 - Manhattan Center, New York, NY

The night of this recording Garland had a bad case of laryngitis and finished only 9 of the 13 scheduled songs. Later that night, after the audience left, she completed "Why Can't I?" and attempted "Do What You Do", but halted it after singing just the verse.

1. Sail Away
2. Something's Coming
3. Just In Time
4. Get Me to the Church on Time
5. Never Will I Marry
6. Joey, Joey, Joey
7. Hey, Look Me Over
8. Some People
9. The Party's Over
10. Why Can't I?
11. Do What You Do (Partial recording)

Originally released by Capitol Records in 1989 as Judy Garland Live!.

November 8 & November 15, 1964 - London Palladium, London, England

with Liza Minnelli.

1. Overture
2. Once in a Lifetime (Judy Garland)
3. Maggie, Maggie May (Judy Garland)
4. As Long as He Needs Me (Judy Garland)
5. Just in Time (Judy Garland)
6. It's Yourself (Judy Garland)
7. The Travelin' Life (Liza Minnelli)
8. Pass That Peace Pipe (Liza Minnelli)
9. The Gypsy in My Soul (Liza Minnelli)
10. How Could You Believe Me? (Liza Minnelli)
11. Maybe This Time (Liza Minnelli)
12. Hello, Dolly! (Judy Garland & Liza Minnelli)
13. Hello, Dolly! (Reprise) (Judy Garland & Liza Minnelli)
14. Together (Wherever We Go) (Judy Garland & Liza Minnelli)
15. Smile (Judy Garland)
16. Never Will I Marry (Judy Garland)
17. The Man That Got Away (Judy Garland)
18. Medley: (Judy Garland & Liza Minnelli)
  a) We Could Make Such Beautiful Music Together
  b) The Best Is Yet to Come
19. Bob White (Whatcha Gonna Swing Tonight) (Judy Garland & Liza Minnelli)
20. Don't Rain on My Parade (Judy Garland)
21. Medley: (Liza Minnelli)
  a) Take Me Along
  b) If I Could Be with You
  c) Tea for Two
  d) Who?
  e) They Can't Take That Away from Me
  f) By Myself
  g) Take Me Along (Reprise)
  h) My Mammy
22. Medley: (Judy Garland & Liza Minnelli)
  a) Hooray for Love
  b) After You've Gone
  c) By Myself
  d) 'S Wonderful
  e) How About You?
  f) Lover, Come Back to Me
  g) You and the Night and the Music
  h) It All Depends on You
23. Make Someone Happy (Judy Garland)
24. Joey, Joey, Joey (Judy Garland)
25. The Music That Makes Me Dance (Judy Garland)
26. I'm All I've Got (Liza Minnelli)
27. It's Just a Matter of Time (Liza Minnelli)
28. If I Were in Your Shoes (Liza Minnelli)
29. What Now, My Love? (Judy Garland)
30. Johnny One Note (Judy Garland)
31. Medley: (Judy Garland & Liza Minnelli)
  a) Get Happy
  b) Happy Days Are Here Again
32. Medley: (Judy Garland & Liza Minnelli)
  a) When the Saints Go Marching In
  b) Brotherhood of Man
33. He's Got the Whole World in His Hands (Judy Garland & Liza Minnelli)
34. Battle Hymn of the Republic (Judy Garland & Liza Minnelli)
35. Rock-a-Bye Your Baby with a Dixie Melody (Judy Garland)
36. Who's Sorry Now? (Liza Minnelli)
37. Swanee (Judy Garland & Liza Minnelli)
38. Chicago (Judy Garland & Liza Minnelli)
39. Over the Rainbow (Judy Garland)
40. San Francisco (Judy Garland & Liza Minnelli)

Originally released by Capitol Records in 1965 as "Live" at the London Palladium.

July 20, 1968 - Philadelphia, PA

with Count Basie and His Orchestra

1. Medley:
  a) I Hear Music
  b) The Sweetest Sounds
  c) Strike Up the Band

Available on JSP Records 2011 release Swan Songs, First Flights.

July 20, 1968 - JFK Stadium, Philadelphia, PA
1. Overture
2. For Once in My Life
3. Medley:
  a) Almost Like Being in Love
  b) This Can't Be Love
4. Never Will I Marry
5. How Insensitive
6. Zing! Went the Strings of My Heart
7. What Now, My Love?
8. The Man I Love
9. Make Someone Happy
10. Do I Love You?
11. By Myself
12. That's Entertainment!
13. The Man That Got Away
14. Rock-a-Bye Your Baby with a Dixie Melody
15. For Once in My Life (Reprise)
16. Over the Rainbow

Available on JSP Records 2011 release Swan Songs, First Flights.

October 1968 - Rehearsal

with John Meyer on piano.

1. I Loved Him, But He Didn't Love Me
2. For Once in My Life

Available on JSP Records 2011 release Swan Songs, First Flights.

November 17, 1968 - Lincoln Center, New York, NY

Tribute to Harold Arlen, Vincent Youmans, and Noël Coward

1. The Man That Got Away
2. It's a New World
3. Get Happy
4. Over the Rainbow

Available on JSP Records 2016 release Judy Garland Sings Harold Arlen.

December 30, 1968—February 1, 1969 - Talk of the Town, London, England
1. Overture
2. I Belong to London
3. Get Happy
4. The Man That Got Away
5. I'd Like to Hate Myself in the Morning
6. Just in Time
7. Just in Time (Reprise)
8. Medley:
  a) You Made Me Love You
  b) For Me and My Gal
  c) The Trolley Song
9. For Once in My Life
10. San Francisco
11. Over the Rainbow
12. Chicago

Additional recordings from Garland's December 30, 1968—February 1, 1969, engagement at Talk of the Town, London, England:

- I Belong to London
- The Man That Got Away
- I'd Like to Hate Myself in the Morning
- Medley:
  a) You Made Me Love You
  b) For Me and My Gal
  c) The Trolley Song

Available on JSP Records 2011 release Swan Songs, First Flights.

March 25, 1969 - Falkoner Centret, Copenhagen, Denmark
1. Overture
2. Get Happy
3. Just in Time
4. The Man That Got Away
5. I'd Like to Hate Myself in the Morning
6. For Once in My Life
7. Rock-a-Bye Your Baby with a Dixie Melody
8. Chicago
9. Till the Clouds Roll By (with Johnnie Ray)*
10. Am I Blue? (with Johnny Ray)*
11. San Francisco
12. Over the Rainbow

Available on JSP Records 2011 release Swan Songs, First Flights. Songs marked with an asterisk (*) are not included on this release because they were discovered, remastered and released for the first time via the Judy Room's YouTube channel in 2017.

== See also ==
- Judy Garland discography
