= Good News of 1938 =

American old-time radio program

- Other names: Good News of 1939; Good News of 1940; Maxwell House Coffee Time; Hollywood Good News
- Genre: Variety
- Country of origin: United States
- Language: English
- Syndicates: NBC
- Hosted by: James Stewart; Robert Taylor; Robert Young; Dick Powell
- Original release: November 4, 1937 – July 25, 1940
- Sponsored by: Maxwell House coffee

Good News of 1938 was an American radio program. It was broadcast on NBC from November 4, 1937, until July 25, 1940. As the years changed, so did the title, becoming Good News of 1939 and Good News of 1940. In its last few months on the air, it was known as Maxwell House Coffee Time. Some sources also refer to the program as Hollywood Good News. The program was notable for marking "the first time that a national network joined hands with a major film studio to create a show for sale to a commercial sponsor."

== Format ==
Much like Lux Radio Theatre, which preceded it on radio, Good News of 1938 featured adaptations of films accompanied by interviews with film personalities. Unlike its predecessor, however, Good News was tied to one film company, Metro-Goldwyn-Mayer, which controlled both the financial and programming elements of the show. Also unlike Lux, Good News presented adaptations of upcoming films rather than those that had already been seen in theaters. The program's first episode featured scenes from The Firefly (1937), with Allan Jones and Jeanette MacDonald reprising their roles from the film.

Besides adaptations of films, the show offered "Backstage at the Movies", a feature in which listeners heard MGM executives discussing plans for future films. Good News was presented before a live audience in a 1,500-seat theater. Often more fans waited outside, hoping to get in.

The sponsor, Maxwell House coffee, paid $25,000 per week, and MGM took care of the rest.

== Personnel ==
James Stewart was the program's initial host. Robert Taylor succeeded him in the first half of 1938, and Robert Young followed him the fall of 1938. Beginning in the fall of 1939, a variety of MGM people filled in as hosts, and Dick Powell was the show's final host in 1940. Frank Morgan appeared regularly in a comedy role, as did Fanny Brice and Hanley Stafford in their roles of Baby Snooks and her father. An MGM chorus directed by Max Terr provided music along with soloists, including Betty Jaynes, Connee Boswell, and Judy Garland.

On May 19, 1938, Joan Crawford opened a new portion of the show titled “MGM Theater of the Air”, performing a dramatic interlude called “Dark World”.

Brice initially appeared on the show's fourth episode on November 25, 1937. Herbert G. Goldman wrote in his book, Fanny Brice: The Original Funny Girl, "Baby Snooks put Good News on the hit list and started Fanny on the radio career she would continue for the rest of her short life." After Good News ended, Morgan and Brice continued to perform on Maxwell House Coffee Time, a 30-minute program in which each had a 15-minute segment.

Ted Pearson and Warren Hull were the program's announcers. Ed Gardner was the director, and Meredith Willson was the musical director. Producers included Bill Bacher.

== Critical reaction ==
A writer for the Detroit Free Press found flaws in Good News of 1938. Edgar A Guest, Jr., writing in the newspaper's February 20, 1938, issue, commented that the program "could be much more entertaining if more care were taken with the production work." He cited noise from the audience that was audible at inappropriate times and "at least half a dozen mistakes" in one episode when stars noticeably missed cues or mangled lines in the script.
