= The Danny Kaye Show (radio program) =

American old-time radio comedy-variety program

- Genre: Comedy-variety
- Country of origin: United States
- Language: English
- Syndicates: CBS
- TV adaptations: The Danny Kaye Show
- Starring: Danny Kaye
- Announcer: Ken Niles; Dick Joy
- Written by: Sylvia Fine; Abe Burrows; Goodman Ace
- Directed by: Dick Mack
- Produced by: Goodman Ace
- Original release: January 6, 1945 – May 31, 1946
- Sponsored by: Pabst Blue Ribbon beer

The Danny Kaye Show is an American old-time radio comedy-variety program starring Danny Kaye. Broadcast on the CBS radio network, it ran from January 6, 1945 to May 31, 1946.

== Format ==
The Danny Kaye Show featured singing, instrumental music, and various kinds of comedy sketches. In Nobody's Fool, Martin Gottfried wrote about the program: "Everything about it was to be top drawer, beginning with Kaye's then record salary of $16,000 a week (compared to the $100 apiece he had been paid for three minor CBS radio shows in 1940)."

== Personnel ==
In addition to Kaye, the cast included Eve Arden and Lionel Stander as regulars, with the supporting cast including and Frank Nelson (playing sponsor Mr. Pabst in the premiere), Kenny Delmar, Everett Sloane, Joan Edwards, and Butterfly McQueen. Announcers were Ken Niles and Dick Joy. Music was under the direction of Harry James, Lyn Murray, David Terry, and Harry Sosnik. Dick Mack was the director. The producer was Goodman Ace, described by Gottfried in Nobody's Fool as "radio's premier comedy writer, who had so estimable a reputation that even though the program would be broadcast from Los Angeles, he was able to insist on running it from New York."

A behind-the-scenes influence was Kaye's wife, Sylvia Fine, a producer, composer, and lyricist in her own right. Gottfried wrote, "She demanded and won the right to approve the show's writers." She also wrote for the program, along with Ace and Abe Burrows.

== See also ==
- The Danny Kaye Show television program
