= Theme from San Francisco =

Song

"Theme from San Francisco," also known as "San Francisco," is a song from the 1936 American film San Francisco. It was written by Bronislaw Kaper and Walter Jurmann, with lyrics by Gus Kahn. It is sung by Jeanette MacDonald six times in the film, and becomes an anthem for the survivors of the 1906 earthquake.

The lyrics of the chorus begin as follows:
"San Francisco, open your Golden Gate
You'll let no stranger wait outside your door
San Francisco, here is your wanderin' one
Saying I'll wander no more. "

The song is now a popular sentimental sing-along at public events such as the city's annual earthquake commemoration, as well as being played on the organ at the historic (1922) Castro Theatre prior to the showing of films. It is one of two official city songs, along with "I Left My Heart in San Francisco."

Judy Garland included the song in her concert repertoire, with a new introduction that starts, "I never will forget Jeanette MacDonald; just to think of her it gives my heart a pang. I never will forget, how that brave Jeanette, just stood there in the ruins and sang. A-a-a-and sang..." She opened a late 1950s concert at the Cow Palace with her version. It was so well and tumultuously received that she sang it again as an encore. In her later career, her interpretation grew darker. She parodies Jeanette's happy performance gradually becoming more serious, climaxing at, "but the only bridge that's a real gone bridge is the bridge across the bay," often sung with desperation near the point of collapse.

The song was also sung by the cast of Beach Blanket Babylon at Candlestick Park prior to Game 3 of the 1989 World Series on October 27, 1989, ten days following the Loma Prieta earthquake.

The song was played after every score by the San Francisco 49ers at Candlestick Park and continues on into their current games at Levi's Stadium.

== Other versions ==
Vikki Carr covered "San Francisco" on her 1963 debut LP, Color Her Great.
