= A Pretty Girl Milking Her Cow =

18th-century Irish song

A Pretty Girl Milking Her Cow (Cailin Deas Crúite na mBó in the Irish language) is a traditional 18th-century Irish ballad. The English version is attributed to Thomas Moore (1779–1852). Originally sung in Irish Gaelic, the song was popular through the early 20th century.

== History ==
The song was sung by Jack Jones the teenage son of Anne Jones the publican of the Glenrowan Inn (Victoria, Australia) while it was under siege by the Kelly Gang. The siege was broken by the Victorian Police on the morning of Monday June 28, 1880. Jack Jones died of injuries sustained during the police assault on the hotel.

Percy Grainger recorded an English language version on wax cylinder from Joseph Leaning of Lincolnshire in 1906, which has been digitised and can be heard online. In 1907, the Austrian ethnologist Rudolf Trebitsch used the same technology to record an Irish language version in County Kerry. Some time in the early 1900s, the famous uilleann piper Patsy Touhey was recorded playing a version, which is available on the Irish Traditional Music Archive.

== Popular versions ==
It enjoyed a revival when an updated swing version sung by Irish-American singer/actress Judy Garland was featured in the 1940 film Little Nellie Kelly. The updated version is true to the original musical air, and incorporated original lyrics by MGM Musical Director Roger Edens, and featured Garland singing the song to George Murphy using some of the original Gaelic lyrics in the first chorus, which was true to the traditional air, before moving into an up-tempo swing version typical of the era.

The song was released as the B-side of the more popular Garland song It's A Great Day for the Irish by Decca Records in 1940. It became a popular song for Irish-Americans during St Patrick's Day celebrations. It remained a popular number for Garland throughout her career, and most notably she sang it live in its original Irish language version in July 1951 at her Theatre Royal concerts in Dublin, Ireland. A Dublin review stated: "Remember the song she sang in "Nellie Kelly" – "The Pretty Girl Milking Her Cow." Judy is providing herself with the Irish version – "Cailin Deas Cruidte na mBo" while in Ireland". Later in 1951, she included the song in her first record-breaking appearance at New York's Palace Theatre, although this time reverting to the new version that combined both English- and Irish-language lyrics. The song is also featured on Garland at the Grove on Capitol Records, recorded live in 1958 at the Coconut Grove in Hollywood. Singers and groups including Bing Crosby, Ruby Murray, Eileen Barton, Carmel Quinn, Clannad, The Fureys, Blackthorn Ceilidh Band, Runa and The Chieftains, Altan among others, have recorded the song in either form or a combination of both. Duck Baker recorded a fingerstyle guitar arrangement.

The folksinger and actor Suzuki Tsunekichi (Japanese: 鈴木常吉) used "A Pretty Girl Milking a Cow" as the basis for his song "Omoide" (Japanese: 思ひで), or "Memories," pairing the traditional melody with new lyrics that evoke nostalgia, sorrow, and the transience of life. "Omoide" appears on Suzuki's 2006 album "Zeigo" (Japanese: ぜいご), and an excerpt from it was used as the opening theme for the TBS/Netflix television drama Shinya Shokudō (Japanese: 深夜食堂; known in English as "Midnight Diner").

== Lyrics ==
Tá bliain nó níos mó agam ag éisteacht
Le cogar doilíosach mo mheoin,
Ó casadh liom grá geal mo chléibhe
Tráthnóna breá gréine san fhómhar.
Bhí an bhó bhainne chumhra ag géimneach
Is na h-éanlaith go meidhreach ag ceol,
Is ar bhruach an tsrutháin ar leathaobh dhom
Bhí cailín deas crúite na mbó.

Tá a súile mar lonradh na gréine,
Ag scaipeadh trí spéartha gan cheo,
's is deirge a grua ná na caora
Ar lasadh measc craobha na gcnó,
Tá a béilín níos milse ná sméara,
's is gile ná leamhnacht a snó,
Níl ógbhean níos deise san saol seo
Ná cailín deas crúite na mbó.

Dá bhfaighinnse Ardtiarnas na hÉireann
Éadaí síoda is sróil
Dá bhfaighinnse an bhanríon is airde
Dá bhfuil ar an dtalamh so beo
Dá bhfaighinnse céad loingis mar spré dhom
Pioláidi, caisleáin is ór
B'fhearr liom bheith fán ar na sléibhte
Lem' chailín deas crúite na mbó

Muna bhfuil sé i ndán dom bheith in éineacht
Leis an spéirbhean ró-dhílis úd fós
Is daoirseach, dobrónach mo shaolsa
Gan suaimhneas, gan éifeacht, gan treo
Ní bheidh sólás im' chroí ná im' intinn
Ná suaimhneas orm oíche ná ló
Nó bhfeice mé taobh liom óna muintir
Mo cailín deas crúite na mbó

== English version ==
There are various versions of this song. The following English version is not a translation of the Irish given above, but rather a different set of lyrics set to the same tune.

It was on a fine summers morning,
The birds sweetly tuned on each bough,
And as I walked out for my pleasure,
I saw a pretty girl milking her cow;
Her voice so enchanting, melodious,
Left me quite unable to go,
My heart it was loaded with sorrow,
For cailín deas crúite na mbó.

Then to her I made my advances;
"Good morrow, most beautiful maid,
Your beauty my heart so entrances!--"
"Pray sir, do not banter," she said;
"I'm not such a rare precious jewel,
That I should enamour you so,
I am but a poor little milk girl,"
Says cailín deas crúite na mbó.

"The Indies afford no such jewels,
So precious and transparently fair,
Oh ! do not to my flame add fuel,
But consent for to love me my dear,
Take pity and grant my desire,
And leave me no longer in woe,
Oh ! love me or else I'll expire,
Sweet cailín deas crúite na mbó.

"Or had I the wealth of great Damer,
Or all on the African shore,
Or had I great Devonshire treasure,
Or had I ten thousand times more,
Or had I the lamp of Alladin,
Or had I his genie also,
I'd rather live poor on a mountain,
With cailín deas crúite na mbó."

"I'll beg you'll withdraw and don't tease me
I cannot consent unto thee,
I like to live single and airy,
Till more of the world I do see,
New cares they would me embarrass
Besides, sir, my fortune is low,
Until I get rich I'll not marry,"
Says cailín deas crúite na mbó.

"An old maid is like an old almanack,
Quite useless when once out of date,
If her ware is not sold in the morning,
At noon it must fall to low rate,
The fragrance of May is soon over,
The rose loses its beauty you know,
All bloom is consumed in October,
Sweet cailín deas crúite na mbó.

"A young maid is like a ship sailing,
There's no knowing how long she may steer,
For with every blast she's in danger,
Oh consent love and banish all care,
For riches I care not a farthing,
Your affection I want and no more,
In comfort I'd wish to enjoy you,
My cailín deas crúite na mbó."
