= Little Nellie Kelly =

1940 film by Norman Taurog

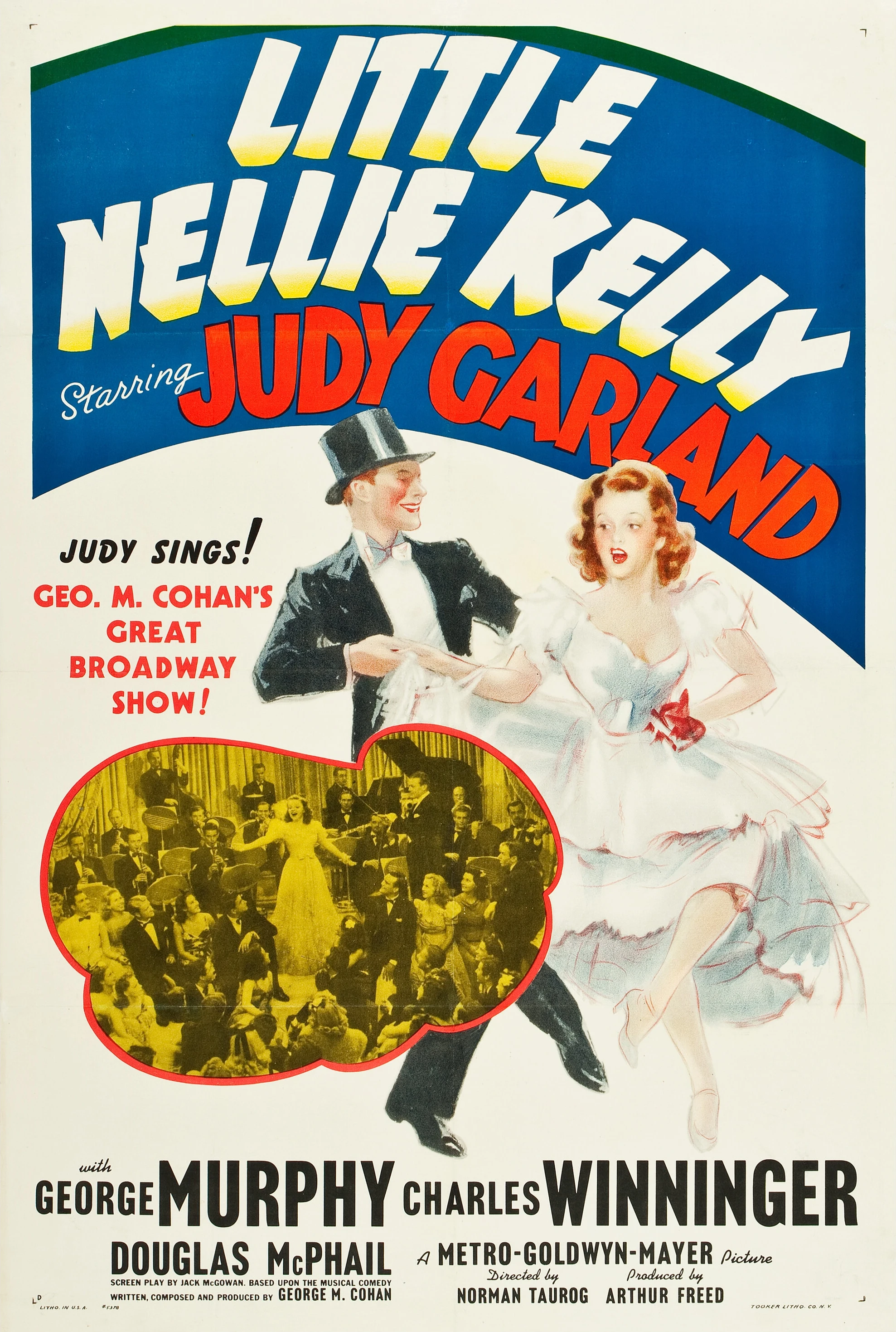
- Theatrical release poster
- Directed by: Norman Taurog
- Screenplay by: Jack McGowan
- Based on: Little Nellie Kelly; 1922 musical by George M. Cohan
- Produced by: Arthur Freed
- Starring: Judy Garland; George Murphy
- Cinematography: Ray June
- Edited by: Fredrick Y. Smith
- Music by: Roger Edens; William Axt
- Production company: Metro-Goldwyn-Mayer
- Distributed by: Loew's, Inc.
- Release date: November 22, 1940
- Running time: 98 minutes
- Country: United States
- Language: English
- Budget: $718,000
- Box office: $2,046,000

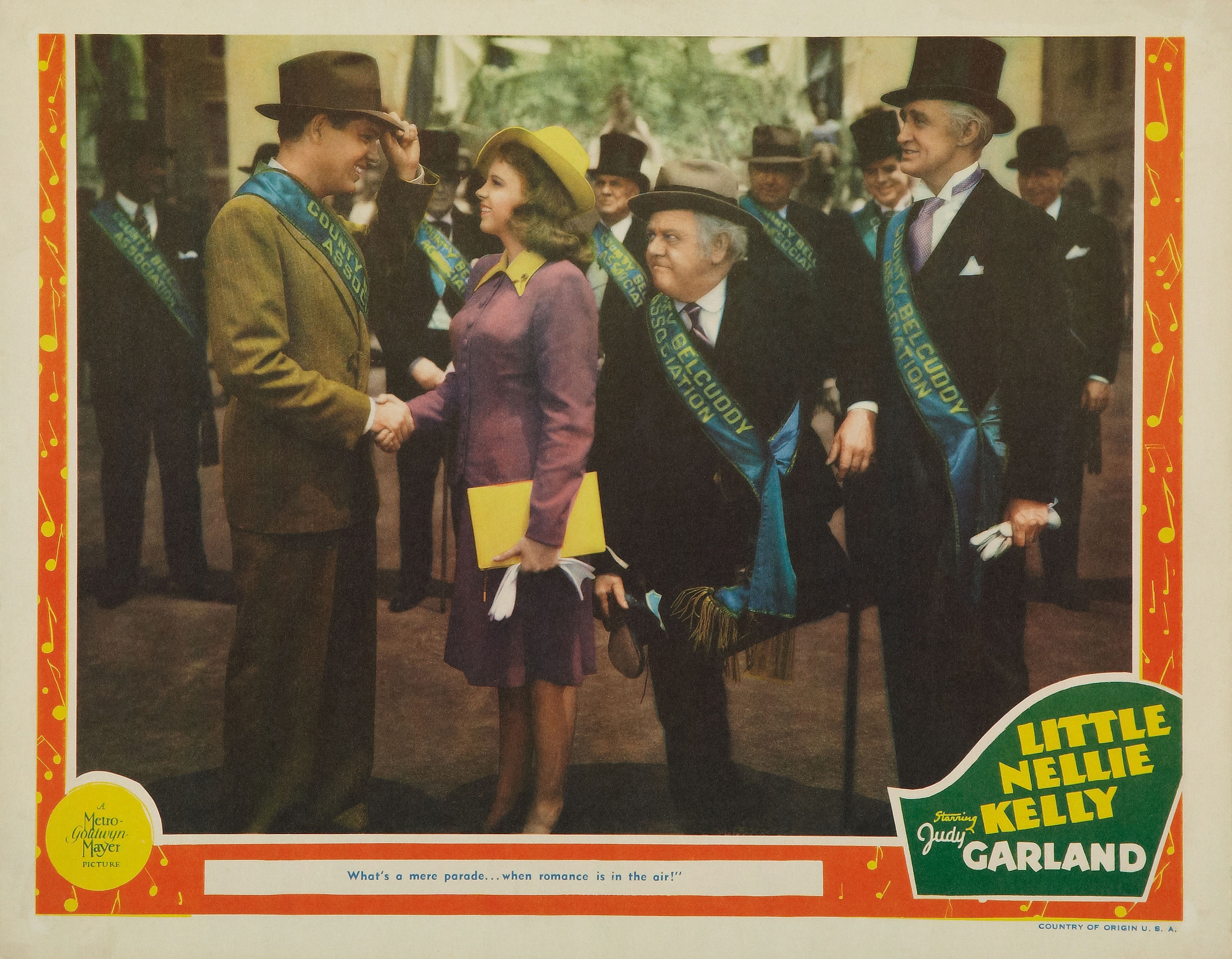
Lobby card

Little Nellie Kelly is a 1940 American musical-comedy film based on the stage musical of the same title by George M. Cohan which was a hit on Broadway in 1922 and 1923. The film was written by Jack McGowan and directed by Norman Taurog. Its cast included Judy Garland, George Murphy, Charles Winninger and Douglas McPhail.

The film is notable for containing Judy Garland's only on-screen death scene, but she re-appears in the film as the daughter of the character who died.

== Plot ==
In Ireland, Jerry Kelly marries his sweetheart Nellie Noonan over the objections of her ne'er-do-well father Michael Noonan, who swears never to speak to Jerry again, even though he reluctantly accompanies the newlyweds to the U.S., where Jerry becomes a policeman and all three become citizens. Michael continues to hold his grudge against Jerry even when Nellie dies shortly after giving birth to her daughter, also named Nellie.

Years later, Jerry is now a captain on the police force, and Nellie has grown up as the spitting image of her mother. Michael dotes on his granddaughter but is embarrassed when she sings in public at the police department parade (It's a Great Day for the Irish). He uses a supposed weak heart, for which he takes a tot of whiskey from a medicine bottle, to get his way with Nellie and to avoid work. When Nellie becomes enamored with Dennis Fogarty, the son of Michael's old friend Timothy Fogarty, the conflict in the home intensifies. Jerry is happy for her, but Michael objects to the romance, and when Nellie, encouraged by her father, finally stands up to him, he leaves home.

Eventually, the three generations are reconciled, and Nellie and Dennis remain a couple.

== Cast ==
- Judy Garland as Nellie Noonan Kelly and as Little Nellie Kelly
- George Murphy as Jerry Kelly
- Charles Winninger as Michael "Mike" Noonan
- Douglas McPhail as Dennis Fogarty
- Arthur Shields as Timothy Fogarty
- Rita Page as Mrs. Mary Fogarty
- Forrester Harvey as Moriarity
- James Burke as Police Sergeant McGowan
- George Watts as Mr. Keevan, NYC Bar Owner

== Songs ==
Judy Garland sings a swing version of "Singin' in the Rain" more than 10 years before Gene Kelly famously sang it in his film Singin' in the Rain (1952) as well as sings several newer songs, including the traditional "A Pretty Girl Milking Her Cow" sung partly in Irish-Gaelic. There are also two production numbers, one set at the New York City Policeman's Ball and the other written by Roger Edens. In the latter, Garland sings "It's A Great Day for the Irish" while marching in New York City's St. Patrick's Day Parade. This song became one of Garland's bigger hits.

Songs cut from the film include "Rings on Your Fingers and Bells on Your Toes" (used in Garland's later film Babes on Broadway, 1941), "Danny Boy" and "How Can You Buy Killarney".

== Production ==
After the success of The Wizard of Oz (1939), the film was a "test" by MGM to evaluate both Garland's audience appeal and her physical image. It was rumored at the time that George M Cohan sold the rights expressly as a vehicle for Garland. The film gave 18-year-old Garland the opportunity to grow up as she is in the first half of the picture set in Ireland, in which she plays Nellie Noonan, the mother of Little Nellie Kelly. Although called "a bit of Blarney", overall the film was well-received. Critics noted Garland "gets prettier with each picture".

== Reception ==
According to MGM records, the film earned $968,000 in the U.S. and Canada and $1,078,000 in other markets, resulting in a profit of $680,000.

Bosley Crowther reviews the film for The New York Times on Christmas Day, December 25, 1940, finding it “only passing fair, and hardly the sort of picture to send folks dancing with Christmas cheer in the streets…. the story is pieced together out of all the comic and sentimental Irish-American cliches that have been knocking around for years. …Along the way, there is… a sprinkle of pretty singing of several songs by Judy Garland. And that's about all. But this is Christmas morning, so let's be tolerant. Let's even be joyful. Let's say that "Little Nellie Kelly" is a pleasant picture for the family trade, and then let's give three cheers for good old gentle St. Mick.”

== Home media ==
The film was released on DVD on March 15, 2011.

== See also ==
- List of films set in Ireland
