= It's a Great Day for the Irish =

Song performed by Judy Garland

"It's a Great Day for the Irish" is an Irish-American song that was written in 1940 by Roger Edens, one of the many musical directors at the Metro-Goldwyn-Mayer studios under the leadership of Arthur Freed for inclusion in the film version of the George M. Cohan 1922 Broadway show Little Nellie Kelly, directed by Norman Taurog. The rights of the show were sold to MGM by Cohan as a starring vehicle for Judy Garland. The song was partly written to capitalize on Garland's identification with her Irish roots (Garland was a quarter Irish through her maternal grandmother Eva Fitzpatrick).

The new song was to be used in a recreation of New York's famed annual Saint Patrick's Day Parade marching up Fifth Avenue. It was to be a major production number requiring the New York Street set on the backlot to be enlarged, involving the main characters of the film and showcasing Garland's enormously strong voice and engaging performance style as she sang and danced up the avenue with her father, played by George Murphy, her stereotypical grandfather (played by Charles Winninger) and her boyfriend (Douglas McPhail). The movie was well received, but is now most remembered for the rousing song it introduced into Irish-American culture and as Garland's only death scene on film.

== Recordings ==
The song was originally recorded by Garland on Decca Records in 1940 as a single with another song from the film, "A Pretty Girl Milking Her Cow", on the B-side. The song was a very successful hit for her and the original Decca version has remained in the catalogue since the 1940s. It was recorded several more times throughout her career with the last time being at the "London Sessions" under the musical direction of Norrie Paramor for Capitol Records in 1960. She often sang it live, particularly in concerts in Ireland and the UK where audiences clapped, sang along and danced in the aisles. During her famed Amsterdam concert, the audience stomped their feet and demanded the song to which Garland giggled and replied "Well, okay - it's very loud".

One particular review of a show wrote, "She shook the walls with her raucous rendition". The lively song included a special verse of difficult tongue-twisting rhyming Irish surnames and places, that seemed to thunder from Garland's throat effortlessly. The song was popular on jukeboxes in Irish Pubs and was recorded by numerous other Irish and Irish-American artists, including Bing Crosby, Ruby Murray, Daniel O'Donnell, Frank Parker, Carmel Quinn, and The Clancy Brothers among others. Italian-American singer Connie Francis also recorded the song.

== Cultural anthem ==
The song went on to become a worldwide Saint Patrick's Day anthem and its familiar strains are heard on the occasion around the world annually. The lively upbeat song is a favourite played by military and school marching bands everywhere and is now a standard sound for the "Great Day" as popular as "The Wearing of the Green" and has been firmly embedded in Irish-American culture.

== Lyrics ==
Oh, I woke me up this morning and I heard a joyful song
From the throats of happy Irishmen, a hundred thousand strong
Sure it was the Hibernian Brigade
Lining up for to start the big parade
So I fetched me Sunday bonnet and the flag I love so well
And I bought meself a shamrock just to wear in me lapel
Don't you know that today's March seventeen?
It's the day for the wearing of the green...........

It's a great day for the Irish, it's a great day for fair
The side-walks of New York are thick with Blarney
For shure you'd think New York was Old Killarney

Begosh and begorragh, every Irish son and daughter
Every good old Irish name and their relation
They come from Tipperary, Donegal and County Kerry,

They are all here to join the celebration..........
There's Connolly and Donnelly, Ryan, O'Brien,
McLoughlin and Lynch, Pat Flannigan, McFadden, McPhearson and Finch
Hogan and Logan, Fitzpatrick, O'Bannigan, Danny O'Doole and Seamus O'Tool!

(note the Garland version includes a fast paced additional litany of names at this point)

Following are the litany of names:

Now, there's Terrence O'Toole and his cousin, Phil Doherty, Patrick O'Bogle and Mullin McGrew, Mike Maley, Tim Dayley, and Barney O'Flagherty, Daniel Doolan and Shamus Carewe.

Conleys and Donleys and Padraic O'Bannigan, Ryans, O'Briens, McLaughlins, and Lynch, McGloans and McFaddens and Mister Pat Flannagan, Hogans and Glogans, McPhersons and Finch.

Clearys and Learys, Barney O'Hea, Phalens and Whalens, Patrick O'Shea.

Cowans, McGowans, and Carricks and Garricks, Mahoneys, Maloneys, O'Donnels, O'Connels Are here to join the jubilee!

It's a great day for the Shamrock, for the flags in full array
We're feeling so inspirish, shure because for all the Irish
It's a great, great day.....

It's a great day for the Irish, it's a great day for fair
Begosh, there's not a cop to stop a raiding
Begorrah all the cops are out parading
It's a great day for the Shamrock, for the flags in full array
And as we go a-swinging, every Irish heart is singing
It's a great, great day........
