= Judy Garland discography =

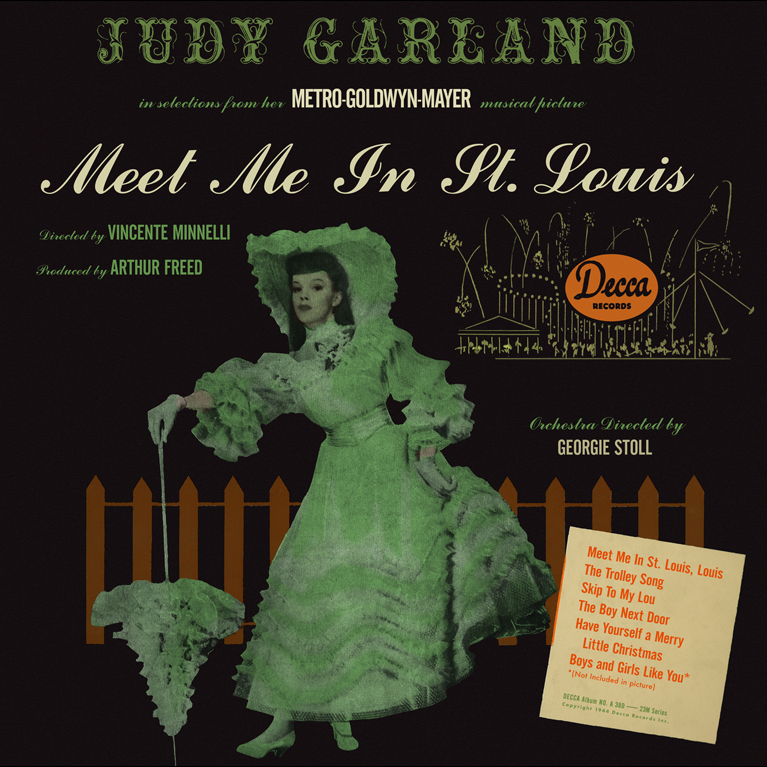
- Garland on an album cover in 1944
- Studio albums: 11
- Soundtrack albums: 11
- Live albums: 7
- Compilation albums: 31
- Singles: 67

Judy Garland signed her first recording contract at age 13 with Decca Records in late 1935. Garland began recording albums for Capitol Records in the 1950s. Her greatest success, Judy at Carnegie Hall (1961), was listed for 73 weeks on the Billboard 200 chart (including 13 weeks at number one), was certified Gold, and took home five Grammy Awards (including Album of the Year and Best Female Vocal Performance).

== Albums ==
=== Studio albums ===
Title	Album details	Peak chart positions
Title	Album details	US
The Wizard of Oz (with Victor Young and his orchestra)	Released: 1939; Label: Decca; Formats: 78 Album	—
Girl Crazy	Released: April 6, 1944; Label: Decca; Formats: 78 Album	—
Meet Me in St. Louis	Released: November 2, 1944; Label: Decca; Formats: 78 Album	2
The Harvey Girls	Released: November 1, 1945; Label: Decca; Formats: 78 Album	—
Miss Show Business	Released: September 26, 1955; Label: Capitol; Formats: LP	5
Judy	Released: October 10, 1956; Label: Capitol; Formats: LP	17
Alone	Released: May 6, 1957; Label: Capitol; Formats: LP	17
Judy in Love	Released: November 3, 1958; Label: Capitol; Formats: LP	—
The Letter	Released: May 4, 1959; Label: Capitol; Formats: LP	—
That's Entertainment!	Released: October 31, 1960; Label: Capitol; Formats: LP	—
The Garland Touch	Released: August 6, 1962; Label: Capitol; Formats: LP	33

Notes

- The Decca albums are studio recordings of songs featured in titled films, not soundtrack recordings.

=== Live albums ===
Title	Album details	Peak chart positions		Certifications
Title	Album details	US	UK	Certifications
Garland at the Grove	Released: February 2, 1959; Label: Capitol; Formats: LP	—	—	
Judy at Carnegie Hall	Released: July 10, 1961; Label: Capitol; Formats: LP	1	13	RIAA: Gold
Just for Openers	Released: April 6, 1964; Label: Capitol; Formats: LP	—	—	
"Live" at the London Palladium (with Liza Minnelli)	Released: July 25, 1965; Label: Capitol; Formats: LP	41	—	
Judy Garland at Home at the Palace: Opening Night	Released: August 15, 1967; Label: ABC; Formats: LP	174	—	
Judy Garland Live!	Released: June 20, 1989; Label: Capitol; Formats: CD	—	—	
The Amsterdam Concert	Released: November 12, 2012; Label: First Hand Records; Formats: CD	—	—	

=== Soundtrack albums ===
Title	Album details	Peak chart positions	Certifications
Title	Album details	US	Certifications
Till the Clouds Roll By	Released: 1947; Label: MGM; Formats: LP	—	
The Pirate	Released: 1948; Label: MGM; Formats: LP	—	
Words and Music	Released: 1948; Label: MGM; Formats: LP	—	
Easter Parade	Released: 1949; Label: MGM; Formats: LP	—	
In the Good Old Summertime	Released: 1949; Label: MGM; Formats: LP	—	
Summer Stock	Released: 1950; Label: MGM; Formats: LP	—	
A Star Is Born	Released: 1954; Label: Capitol; Formats: LP	5	
The Wizard of Oz	Released: 1956; Label: MGM; Formats: LP	—	RIAA: Gold (Note: 1995 CD re-release.)
Pepe	Released: 1960; Label: Colpix; Formats: LP	—	
Gay Purr-ee	Released: August 1962; Label: Warner Bros.; Formats: LP	—	
I Could Go On Singing	Released: 1963; Label: Capitol; Formats: LP	45	

=== Compilation albums ===
Title	Album details	Peak chart positions	
Title	Album details	US	UK
Judy Garland Souvenir Album	Released: 1940; Label: Decca; Formats: 3×10" 78 r.p.m.	—	
Judy Garland Second Souvenir Album	Released: 1943; Label: Decca; Formats: 4×10" 78 r.p.m.	—	
Judy Garland Sings With...	Released: 1948; Label: Decca; Formats: 78 album	—	—
Judy Garland Souvenir Album a.k.a. Judy Garland Third Souvenir Album	Released: 1949; Label: Decca; Formats: LP (?) 4×10" 78 r.p.m.	—	—
Judy at the Palace	Released: 1951; Label: Decca; Formats: 10" LP	—	—
Judy Garland Sings	Released: 1951; Label: MGM; Formats: LP	—	—
If You Feel Like Singing, Sing	Released: 1954; Label: MGM; Formats: LP	—	—
Born to Sing	Released: 1955; Label: MGM; Formats: LP	—	—
Greatest Performances	Released: 1955; Label: Decca; Formats: LP	—	—
The Magic of Judy Garland	Released: 1961; Label: Brunswick (Decca); Formats: LP	—	—
The Judy Garland Story, Vol. 1	Released: 1961; Label: MGM; Formats: LP	—	—
The Judy Garland Story, Vol. 2	Released: 1962; Label: MGM; Formats: LP	—	—
The Best of Judy Garland	Released: 1963; Label: Decca; Formats: LP	—	—
The Very Best of Judy Garland	Released: 1964; Label: MGM; Formats: LP	—	—
Judy Garland	Released: 1965; Label: Metro (MGM); Formats: LP	—	—
Judy Garland in Song	Released: 1966; Label: Metro (MGM); Formats: LP	—	—
Forever Judy	Released: 1969; Label: MGM; Formats: LP	—	—
Judy Garland's Greatest Hits	Released: 1969; Label: Decca; Formats: LP	161	—

=== Posthumous compilation albums ===
Most recent posthumous compilation album

- Golden Archive Series – Judy Garland (1970)
- Collector's Items 1936–1945 (1970)
- Her Greatest Hits (1970)
- I Could Go On Singing Forever (1970)
- The Immortal Judy Garland (1970)
- The Hollywood Years (1970)
- Judy in London (1972)
- The Best of Judy Garland (1973)
- Judy Garland – MCA Great Entertainers Series (1976)
- The Young Judy Garland (1982)
- Over the Rainbow (1982)
- From the Decca Vaults (1984)
- Golden Greats – Judy Garland (1985)
- America's Treasure (1986)
- The Best of Judy Garland from MGM Classic Films (1987)
- The Best of Judy Garland (1989)
- The Best of The Capitol Years (1989)
- The Best of the Decca Years, Volume 1 – Hits! (1990)
- Golden Memories of Judy Garland (1990)
- The Great MGM Stars: Judy Garland (1991)
- The One and Only (1991)
- The Last Years 1965–1969: It's All for You (1992)
- The Best of the Decca Years, Volume 2 – Changing My Tune (1992)
- Judy Garland – Child of Hollywood (1993)
- The Ladies of the 20th Century: Judy Garland (1993)
- Legends: Judy Garland (1994)
- The Complete Decca Masters (plus) (1994)
- The Best of Judy Garland (1995)
- Great Ladies of Song: Spotlight on Judy Garland (1995)
- 25th Anniversary Retrospective (1995)
- Christmas Through the Years (1995)
- The Judy Garland Christmas Album (1995)
- You Made Me Love You (1996)
- Collectors' Gems from the MGM Films (1996)
- Judy (1998)
- Duets (1998)
- Judy Garland: Biography – A [Musical] Musical Anthology (1998)
- Judy Garland in Hollywood: Her Greatest Movie Hits (1998)
- The One and Only Judy Garland (1999)
- 20th Century Masters – The Millennium Collection: The Best of Judy Garland (1999)
- Legends of the 20th Century – Original Recordings (1999)
- Over the Rainbow: The Very Best of Judy Garland (2001)
- The Show That Got Away (2002)
- Classic Judy Garland – The Capitol Years: 1955–1965 (2002)
- EMI Comedy: Judy Garland (2004)
- That Old Feeling: Classic Ballads from the Judy Garland Show (2005)
- Judy Garland and Friends: Duets (2005)
- Great Day! Rare Recordings from the Judy Garland Show (2006)
- The Essential Judy Garland (2006)
- Greatest Hits Live (2007)
- The Very Best of Judy Garland (2007)
- Lost Tracks 1929–1959 (2010)
- Swan Songs, First Flights (2014)
- Judy Garland: Recordings from the M-G-M Films (Motion Picture Soundtrack Anthology) (2022)
- Judy at 100: 26 Classics in Stereo! (2022)
- Judy Garland: A Celebration (2024)
- Judy Garland: The Alternate 'Judy' Album (2024)

=== Singles ===
Year	A-side	B-side	Catalog No.	Album
1936	"Stompin' at the Savoy"	"Swing, Mr. Charlie"	Decca 848	Non-album single
1937	"Everybody Sing"	"All God's Chillun Got Rhythm"	Decca 1432	Non-album single
1937	"(Dear Mr. Gable) You Made Me Love You"	"You Can't Have Everything"	Decca 1463	The Judy Garland Souvenir Album
1938	"Cry, Baby, Cry"	"Sleep, My Baby, Sleep"	Decca 1796	Non-album single
1938	"It Never Rains But What It Pours"	"Ten Pins in the Sky"	Decca 2017	Non-album single
1939	"Over the Rainbow"	"The Jitterbug"	Decca 2672	The Wizard of Oz
1940	"In Between"	"Sweet Sixteen"	Decca 15045	The Judy Garland Souvenir Album
1940	"Zing! Went the Strings of My Heart"	"I'm Just Wild About Harry"	Brunswick 02969 (U.K.)	Non-album single
1940	"Oceans Apart"	"Figaro"	Decca 2873	The Judy Garland Souvenir Album
1940	"Embraceable You"	"Swanee"	Decca 2881	George Gershwin Songs, Vol. 2
1940	"Buds Won't Bud"	"I'm Nobody's Baby"	Decca 3174	Non-album single
1940	"Friendship" (with Johnny Mercer)	"Wearing of the Green"	Decca 3165	Non-album single
1941	"Our Love Affair"	"I'm Always Chasing Rainbows"	Decca 3593	Non-album single
1941	"It's a Great Day for the Irish"	"A Pretty Girl Milking Her Cow"	Decca 3604	Non-album single
1941	"The Birthday of a King"	"The Star of the East"	Decca 4050	Christmas Candle
1941	"How About You?"	"F.D.R. Jones"	Decca 4072	Non-album single
1941	"Blues in the Night"	"(Can This Be) The End of the Rainbow"	Decca 4081	Non-album single
1942	"Poor You"	"The Last Call for Love"	Decca 18320	Non-album single
1942	"For Me and My Gal" (with Gene Kelly)	When You Wore a Tulip (And I Wore a Big Red Rose) (with Gene Kelly)	Decca 18480	Second Souvenir Album
1942	"I Never Knew (I Could Love Anybody Like I'm Loving You)"	"On the Sunny Side of the Street"	Decca 18524	Second Souvenir Album
1943	"That Old Black Magic"	"Poor Little Rich Girl"	Decca 18540	Second Souvenir Album
1943	"Zing! Went the Strings of My Heart"	"Fascinating Rhythm"	Decca 18543	Second Souvenir Album
1944	"No Love, No Nothin'"	"A Journey to a Star"	Decca 18584	Non-album single
1944	"Embraceable You"	"Could You Use Me?" (with Mickey Rooney)	Decca 23308	Girl Crazy
1944	"But Not for Me"	"Treat Me Rough" (Mickey Rooney solo)	Decca 23309	Girl Crazy
1944	"Bidin' My Time" (featuring the Leo Diamond Harmonica Quintet)	"I Got Rhythm"	Decca 23310	Girl Crazy
1944	"Meet Me in St. Louis, Louis"	"Skip to My Lou"	Decca 23360	Meet Me in St. Louis
1944	"The Trolley Song"	"Boys and Girls Like You and Me"	Decca 23361	Meet Me in St. Louis
1944	"Have Yourself a Merry Little Christmas"	"The Boy Next Door"	Decca 23362	Meet Me in St. Louis
1945	"This Heart of Mine"	"Love"	Decca 18660	The Third Judy Garland Souvenir Album
1945	"Yah-Ta-Ta, Yah-Ta-Ta (Talk, Talk Talk)" (with Bing Crosby)	"You Got Me Where You Want Me" (with Bing Crosby)	Decca 23410	Bing Crosby Sings With...
1945	"On the Atchison, Topeka and the Santa Fe" (with the Merry Macs)	"If I Had You" (with the Merry Macs)	Decca 23436	Judy Garland Sings With...
1945	"On the Atchison, Topeka and the Santa Fe"	"In the Valley (Where the Evenin' Sun Goes Down)"	Decca 23458	The Harvey Girls
1945	"Wait and See" (Kenny Baker solo)	"Swing Your Partner Round and Round"	Decca 23459	The Harvey Girls
1945	"It's a Great Big World" (with Virginia O'Brien and Betty Russell)	"The Wild, Wild West" (Virginia O'Brien solo)	Decca 23460	The Harvey Girls
1946	"For You, For Me, Forevermore" (with Dick Haymes)	"Aren't You Kind of Glad We Did?" (with Dick Haymes)	Decca 23687	Judy Garland Sings With...
1946	"Changing My Tune"	"Love"	Decca 23688	Non-album single
1946	"There Is No Breeze (To Cool the Flame of Love)"	"Don't Tell Me That Story"	Decca 23756	Judy Garland Sings With...
1947	"Connecticut" (with Bing Crosby)	"Mine" (with Bing Crosby)	Decca 23804	Bing Crosby Sings With...
1947	"Look for the Silver Lining"	"Life Upon the Wicked Stage" (Virginia O'Brien solo)	MGM 30002	Till the Clouds Roll By
1947	"Can't Help Lovin' Dat Man" (Lena Horne solo)	"Who?"	MGM 30003	Till the Clouds Roll By
1948	"Pirate Ballet" (The M-G-M Studio Orchestra solo)	"Be a Clown" (with Gene Kelly)	MGM 30097	The Pirate
1948	"Love of My Life"	"You Can Do No Wrong"	MGM 30098	The Pirate
1948	"Niña" (Gene Kelly solo)	"Mack the Black"	MGM 30099	The Pirate
1948	"Johnny One Note"	"I Wish I Were in Love Again" (with Mickey Rooney)	MGM 30099	Words and Music
1948	"Easter Parade" (with Fred Astaire)	"A Fella with an Umbrella" (with Peter Lawford)	MGM 30185	Easter Parade
1948	"A Couple of Swells" (with Fred Astaire)	Medley: a) "I Love a Piano" b) "Snooky Ookums" c) "When the Midnight Train Leaves for Alabam'" (with Fred Astaire)	MGM 30186	Easter Parade
1948	"Better Luck Next Time"	Medley: a) "It Only Happens When I Dance with You" (Fred Astaire solo)	MGM 30187	Easter Parade
1948	"I Wish I Were in Love Again"	"Nothing But You"	Decca 24469	Non-album single
1949	"Merry Christmas"	"Look for the Silver Lining"	MGM 30212	Non-album single
1949	"Put Your Arms Around Me Honey"	"Meet Me Tonight in Dreamland"	MGM 50025	In the Good Old Summertime
1949	"Play That Barbershop Chord" (with the King's Men)	"I Don't Care"	MGM 50026	In the Good Old Summertime
1950	"(Howdy, Neighbor) Happy Harvest"	"If You Feel Like Singing, Sing"	MGM 30251	Summer Stock
1950	"Friendly Star"	"Get Happy"	MGM 30254	Summer Stock
1953	"Send My Baby Back to Me"	"Without a Memory"	Columbia 40010	Non-album single
1953	"Go Home, Joe"	"Heartbroken"	Columbia 40023	Non-album single
1954	"The Man That Got Away"	"Here's What I'm Here For"	Columbia 40270	A Star Is Born
1957	"Its Lovely to Be Back in London"	—N/a	Capitol F 17691-SP (U.K.)	Non-album single
1959	"After You've Gone"	"When You're Smiling"	Capitol PRO 908/909	Garland at the Grove
1959	"The Red Balloon"	"The Worst Kind of Man"	Capitol PRO 1158/1159	The Letter
1959	"Beautiful Trouble"	"That's All There Is (There Isn't Anymore)"	Capitol PRO 1160/1161	The Letter
1961	"Rock-a-Bye Your Baby with a Dixie Melody"	"Zing! Went the Strings of My Heart"	Capitol 4624	Judy at Carnegie Hall
1961	"Comes Once in a Lifetime"	"Sweet Danger"	Capitol 4656	The Garland Touch
1962	"Little Drops of Rain"	"Paris Is a Lonely Town"	Warner Bros. 5310	Gay Purr-ee
1963	"I Could Go on Singing"	"Hello Bluebird"	Capitol 4938	I Could Go on Singing
1965	"Hello, Liza! Hello, Mama! (Hello, Dolly!)" (with Liza Minnelli)	"He's Got the Whole World in His Hands" (with Liza Minnelli)	Capitol 5497	"Live" at the London Palladium
1967	"What Now My Love"	"I Feel a Song Coming On"	ABC 45-10973	Judy Garland at Home at the Palace: Opening Night

=== Charted singles ===
Year	Title	Peak chart positions		Album
Year	Title	US	UK	Album
1939	"Over the Rainbow"	5	–	The Wizard of Oz
1940	"I'm Nobody's Baby"	3	–	Non-album single
1942	"For Me and My Gal" (with Gene Kelly)	3	–	For Me and My Gal
1942	"When You Wore a Tulip (And I Wore a Big Red Rose)" (with Gene Kelly)	19	–	For Me and My Gal
1943	"Zing! Went the Strings of My Heart"	22	–	Non-album single
1944	"Journey to a Star"	22	–	Non-album single
1944	"The Trolley Song"	4	–	Meet Me in St. Louis
1944	"Meet Me In St. Louis"	22	–	Meet Me in St. Louis
1944	"Have Yourself a Merry Little Christmas"	27	–	Meet Me in St. Louis
1945	"Yah-Ta-Ta, Yah-Ta-Ta (Talk, Talk, Talk)" (with Bing Crosby)	5	–	Bing Crosby Sings With...
1945	"This Heart of Mine"	22	–	Non-album single
1945	"On the Atchison, Topeka and the Santa Fe" (with the Merry Macs)	9	–	Judy Garland Sings With...
1946	"Swing Your Partner Round and Round"	24	–	The Harvey Girls
1946	"You'll Never Walk Alone"	21	–	Non-album single
1947	"For You, For Me, Forevermore" (with the Dick Haymes)	19	–	Non-album single
1953	"Without a Memory"	29	–	Non-album single
1955	"The Man That Got Away"	22	18	A Star Is Born

== Songs introduced by Garland ==
- "Blue Butterfly", A Holiday in Storyland (1929) (Note: Ray Miller and His Orchestra recorded this song on November 11, 1929. Without Garland's precise recording date, it is open to question who recorded this song first.)
- "Hang on to a Rainbow", The Wedding of Jack and Jill (1929) (Note: In Showgirl in Hollywood, filmed in late 1929, and released on April 20, 1930, Alice White performed this song, but her voice was dubbed by Belle Mann. Without Garland's precise recording date, it is open to question who recorded this song first.)
- "Stompin' at the Savoy", Decca Single 848 A (1936)
- "Waltz with a Swing", Every Sunday (1936)
- The Balboa", Pigskin Parade (1936)
- The Texas Tornado", Pigskin Parade (1936)
- "It's Love I'm After", Pigskin Parade (1936)
- "Everybody Sing", Broadway Melody of 1938 (1937)
- "Your Broadway and My Broadway", Broadway Melody of 1938 (1937)
- "Yours and Mine", Broadway Melody of 1938 (1937)
- "Got a Pair of New Shoes", Thoroughbreds Don't Cry (1937)
- "Swing, Mr. Mendelssohn", Everybody Sing (1938)
- "Down on the Farm", Everybody Sing (1938)
- "Ever Since the World Began/Shall I Sing a Melody", Everybody Sing (1938)
- "Why? Because!", Everybody Sing (1938)
- "It Never Rains But What It Pours", Love Finds Andy Hardy (1938)
- "In Between", Love Finds Andy Hardy (1938)
- "Meet the Beat of My Heart", Love Finds Andy Hardy (1938)
- "Ten Pins in the Sky", Listen, Darling (1938)
- "On the Bumpy Road to Love", Listen Darling (1938)
- "Over the Rainbow", The Wizard of Oz (1939)
- "The Jitterbug", The Wizard of Oz (1939)
- "Good Morning", Babes in Arms (1939)
- "Figaro", Babes in Arms (1939)
- "Sweet Sixteen", Decca 15045 B (1940)
- "Oceans Apart", Decca 2873 A (1940)
- (Can This Be) The End of the Rainbow", Decca 3231 A (1940)
- "Our Love Affair", Strike Up the Band (1940)
- "Do the La Conga", Strike Up the Band (1940)
- "Nobody", Strike Up the Band (1940)
- "Drummer Boy", Strike Up the Band (1940)
- "A Pretty Girl Milking Her Cow", Little Nellie Kelly (1940)
- "It's a Great Day for the Irish", Little Nellie Kelly (1940)
- "Laugh? I Thought I'd Split My Sides", Ziegfeld Girl (1941)
- "Minnie from Trinidad", Ziegfeld Girl (1941)
- "How About You?", Babes on Broadway (1941)
- "Hoe Down", Babes on Broadway (1941)
- "Chin Up! Cheerio! Carry On!", Babes on Broadway (1941)
- "Babes on Broadway", Babes on Broadway (1941)
- "Three Cheers for the Yanks", For Me and My Gal (1942)
- "The Joint Is Really Jumpin' Down at Carnegie Hall", Thousands Cheer (1943)
- "Tom, Tom the Piper's Son", Presenting Lily Mars (1943)
- "When I Look at You", Presenting Lily Mars (1943)
- "Paging Mr. Greenback", Presenting Lily Mars (1943)
- "We Must Have Music", We Must Have Music (1943)
- "The Boy Next Door", Meet Me in St. Louis (1944)
- "The Trolley Song", Meet Me in St. Louis (1944)
- "Boys and Girls Like You and Me", Meet Me in St. Louis (1944)
- "Have Yourself a Merry Little Christmas", Meet Me in St. Louis (1944)
- "A Great Lady Has an Interview", Ziegfeld Follies of 1946 (1945)
- "You've Got Me Where You Want Me", Decca 23410 B (1945)
- "In the Valley (Where the Evening Sun Goes Down)", The Harvey Girls (1946)
- "On the Atchison, Topeka and the Santa Fe", The Harvey Girls (1946) (Note: Bing Crosby and Johnny Mercer were first to record 78 rpm singles of the song before The Harvey Girls soundtrack was recorded by Garland., who was first to perform it on screen.)
- "It's a Great Big World", The Harvey Girls (1946)
- "My Intuition", The Harvey Girls (1946)
- "March of the Doagies", The Harvey Girls (1946)
- "Hayride", The Harvey Girls (1946)
- "It's a Great Big World", The Harvey Girls (1946)
- "There Is No Breeze (To Cool the Flame of Love)", Decca 23756 B (1946)
- "Don't Tell Me That Story", Decca 23756 B (1946)
- "Connecticut", Decca 23804 A (1947)
- "Mack the Black", The Pirate (1948)
- "Love of My Life", The Pirate (1948)
- "You Can Do No Wrong", The Pirate (1948)
- "Be a Clown", The Pirate (1948)
- "Voodoo", The Pirate (1948)
- "A Fella with an Umbrella", Easter Parade (1948)
- "It Only Happens When I Dance with You", Easter Parade (1948)
- "Mr. Monotony", Easter Parade (1948)
- "A Couple of Swells", Easter Parade (1948)
- "Better Luck Next Time", Easter Parade (1948)
- "Merry Christmas", In the Good Old Summertime (1949)
- "Let's Go West Again", Annie Get Your Gun (1950)
- "If You Feel Like Singing, Sing", Summer Stock (1950)
- "(Howdy, Neighbor) Happy Harvest", Summer Stock (1950)
- "You, Wonderful You", Summer Stock (1950)
- "Friendly Star", Summer Stock (1950)
- "All for You", Summer Stock (1950)
- "Send My Baby Back to Me", Columbia 40010 (1953)
- "Without a Memory", Columbia 40010 (1953)
- "Heartbroken", Columbia 40023 (1953) (Note: The flip side, "Go Home, Joe", recorded by Garland on April 3, 1953, was first recorded by Billy Williams circa October 1952 and released in 1954.)
- "Gotta Have Me Go with You", A Star Is Born (1954)
- "The Man That Got Away", A Star Is Born (1954)
- "Here's What I'm Here For", A Star Is Born (1954)
- "It's a New World", A Star Is Born (1954)
- "Someone at Last", A Star Is Born (1954)
- "Lose That Long Face", A Star Is Born (1954)
- "Maybe I'll Come Back", Judy (Capitol T-734) (1957)
- "It's Lovely to Be Back in London", EMI CL 14791 (1957)
- "The Far Away Part of Town", Pepe (1960)
- "Sweet Danger", Capitol 4656 (1961) (Note: Alfred Drake introduced the song in the Broadway musical Kean, and recorded on November 12, 1961, but Garland was first to record it. The flip side, "Comes Once in a Lifetime" was recorded by Garland on October 13, 1961, however it was first recorded by The McGuire Sisters on October 6, 1961.)
- "Little Drops of Rain", Gay Purr-ee (1962)
- "Take My Hand, Paree", Gay Purr-ee (1962)
- "Paris Is a Lonely Town", Gay Purr-ee (1962)
- "Roses Red, Violets Blue", Gay Purr-ee (1962)
- "Lorna", The Judy Garland Show (1964)

== See also ==
- List of recordings by Judy Garland
