= Judy Garland in Hollywood: Her Greatest Movie Hits =

Compilation album by Judy Garland
- Released: 27 October 1998
- Recorded: 1933–1963
- Labels: Rhino,TCM

Judy Garland chronology
Collectors' Gems from the MGM Films (1996)	Judy Garland in Hollywood: Her Greatest Movie Hits (1998)	Judy (1998)

Judy Garland in Hollywood: Her Greatest Movie Hits, subtitled "Original Soundtrack Performances: 1936-1963", is a compilation album by American singer and actress Judy Garland, released in 1998 by Rhino Movie Music and Turner Classic Movies Music. The 23-track album features recordings from Garland's film career, spanning her early work in Hollywood through her later Metro-Goldwyn-Mayer (MGM) productions.

The compilation received generally favorable reviews, with critics praising Garland's vocal performances and the sound quality of the recordings, while others noting some technical and informational flaws.

== Album details and release ==
In 1998, Judy Garland in Hollywood: Her Greatest Movie Hits was announced for release by Rhino Records on October 27. A contemporary report noted that the 23-track compilation featured liner notes by Grammy-nominated writer Will Friedwald. The release was mentioned among several projects commemorating the 60th anniversary of The Wizard of Oz and the 30th anniversary of Garland's death.

== Critical reception ==
Professional ratings
Review scores
Source	Rating
AllMusic	5/5 stars

AllMusic praised the anthology as a collection of Garland's "most noteworthy performances" that serves "almost as well as a standard greatest-hits collection", noting that it features the original soundtrack recordings, "the real deal, not re-creations". The Village Voice praised Garland's vocal performance, highlighting her rendition of Harold Rome's "F. D. R. Jones" as a particularly striking example of what critic Michael Feingold described as "innocence joyously cubed". Playbill considered it a "fabulous compilation" that includes "stellar original film soundtrack performances".

The ARSC Journal praised the compilation as "most welcome" and described many of the MGM recordings as sounding "better than ever", particularly "I'm Nobody's Baby", commended for "the opulence of its sound". However, the review criticized the "jarring" mono-to-stereo transition in "Gotta Have Me Go with You" and noted errors in the liner notes' recording dates. In Judy Garland: The Day-by-Day Chronicle of a Legend, Scott Schechter praised the compilation for its "excellent sound for the most part" and bringing together Garland's "biggest movie hits" on one CD.

== Track listing ==
Judy Garland in Hollywood: Her Greatest Movie Hits
No.	Title	Writer(s)	From the film	Length
1.	"The Texas Tornado"	Sidney D. Mitchell, Lew Pollack	Pigskin Parade (1936)	1:32
2.	"Dear Mr. Gable/You Made Me Love You (I Didn't Want to Do It)"	Roger Edens, Joe McCarthy, James V. Monaco	Broadway Melody of 1938 (1937)	3:58
3.	"Over the Rainbow"	E. Y. Harburg, Harold Arlen	The Wizard of Oz (1939)	2:46
4.	"I'm Nobody's Baby"	Joseph McCarthy, Milton Ager	Andy Hardy Meets Debutante (1940)	3:34
5.	"F.D.R. Jones"	Harold J. Rome, Roger Edens	Babes on Broadway (1941)	2:49
6.	"For Me and My Gal"	Edgar Leslie, George W. Meyer	For Me and My Gal (1942)	4:22
7.	"The Trolley Song"	Ralph Blane, Hugh Martin	Meet Me in St. Louis (1944)	4:04
8.	"The Boy Next Door"	Ralph Blane, Hugh Martin	Meet Me in St. Louis (1944)	3:30
9.	"On the Atchison, Topeka and the Santa Fe (Excerpt)"	Johnny Mercer, Harry Warren, Kay Thompson, Ralph Blane	The Harvey Girls (1946)	3:29
10.	"Look for the Silver Lining"	Buddy DeSylva, Jerome Kern	Till the Clouds Roll By (1946)	3:16
11.	"Mack the Black"	Cole Porter	The Pirate (1948)	3:47
12.	"Easter Parade"	Irving Berlin	Easter Parade (1948)	2:43
13.	"Johnny One Note"	Lorenz Hart, Richard Rodgers	Words and Music (1948)	2:15
14.	"Last Night When We Were Young (Outtake)"	E. Y. Harburg, Harold Arlen	In the Good Old Summertime (1949)	2:55
15.	"Happy Harvest"	Mack Gordon, Harry Warren	Summer Stock (1950)	2:55
16.	"Friendly Star"	Mack Gordon, Harry Warren	Summer Stock (1950)	3:09
17.	"Get Happy"	Ted Koehler, Harold Arlen	Summer Stock (1950)	2:49
18.	"Gotta Have Me Go with You"	Ira Gershwin, Harold Arlen	A Star Is Born (1954)	3:19
19.	"The Man that Got Away"	Ira Gershwin, Harold Arlen	A Star Is Born (1954)	4:25
20.	"Little Drops of Rain"	E. Y. Harburg, Harold Arlen	Gay Purr-ee (1962)	3:28
21.	"Hello Bluebird"	Cliff Friend	I Could Go On Singing (1963)	4:06
22.	"By Myself"	Howard Dietz, Arthur Schwartz	I Could Go On Singing (1963)	4:29
23.	"I Could Go On Singing"	E. Y. Harburg, Harold Arlen	I Could Go On Singing (1963)

== Personnel ==
Credits adapted from Judy Garland in Hollywood: Her Greatest Movie Hits CD.

- Produced by George Feltenstein
- Project Supervisor: Julie D'Angelo
- Art direction by Hugh Brown and Tornado Design
- Design by Darrin Kagele
- Creative services direction by Lori Carfora
- Liner notes by Will Friedwald
- Engineering by Doug Schwartz, Audio Mechanics, Los Angeles, CA
- Cover paper sculpture by Jacques Kapralik
- Photographs courtesy of Turner Entertainment, Co., George Feltenstein, MGM Clip+Still, and Warner Bros.
- Editorial supervision: Vanessa Atkins
- Licensing: Michael Nieves
- Project assistance: Alexander Alvy
