= The Complete Decca Masters (plus) =

Compilation album by Judy Garland
- Released: 1994
- Recorded: 1936–1947
- Labels: Decca; MCA

Judy Garland chronology
The One and Only (1991)	The Complete Decca Masters (plus) (1994)	25th Anniversary Retrospective (1995)

The Complete Decca Masters (plus) is a 4-CD box set released by in 1994 by Decca and MCA Records, containing 90 tracks spanning Judy Garland' record career with Decca from 1936 to 1947. The compilation includes all 79 master takes released by the singer alongside select alternate versions and a comprehensive 52-page companion booklet.

In 2011, JSP Records released another CD collection titled Smilin’ Through: The Singles Collection 1936-1947, adding nine tracks (alternate versions) for a total of 99 tracks.

== Album details ==
The album is a four-CD compilation containing Judy Garland's recordings for Decca Records between 1936 and 1947. The 90-track collection brings together recordings from different stages of her early career, beginning with her performances as a child singer and continuing through the years of her MGM film stardom. It includes original recordings of several songs later associated with Garland, including "Over the Rainbow", "The Trolley Song" and "Swanee". Among the selections are songs from The Wizard of Oz, Meet Me in St. Louis and The Harvey Girls. It also includes recordings of material written by Harold Arlen, alongside songs by other contemporary songwriters. Several performances feature Garland accompanied by cabaret pianists Eadie Griffith and Rack Godwin, while the set also includes duets with Bing Crosby, recorded during the later years of the collection's period.

The anthology, remastered for the four-CD edition, presents Garland's original Decca recordings rather than the later versions she made for Capitol Records during the 1950s and 1960s. Some of the songs had been rearranged from their film versions for commercial release, while others were recorded independently of her screen performances.

== Critical reception ==
Professional ratings
Review scores
Source	Rating
AllMusic	4.5/5 stars
The Encyclopedia of Popular Music	4/5 stars
The Province	5/5 stars
USA Today	3.5/4 stars

Billboard described the four-CD set as "an invaluable, entertaining testament to an all-around talent", praising the 90 Judy Garland sessions for showcasing a voice that evolved "from talented youngster to hip swinger and sophisticated balladeer", while highlighting both her major film themes and her ability to "go beyond Hollywood vehicles". USA Today praised the compilation for tracing "a broad stylistic arc" in Judy Garland's career, describing the earlier Garland as "more balanced" and capable of singing "torch songs, jazz and humorous novelty numbers", while calling her earliest recordings "a particular delight" and praising her "irresistible adolescent soulfulness".

Stereo Review called it a "revelation", noting that the 90-song collection contains "enough moments here when she can still knock more than your socks off", while praising Garland's ability to "sound great even when saddled with pedestrian arrangements and material" and highlighting her "wryly delicious duets" with Bing Crosby. The New York Times praised the box set for documenting the singer's recordings from 1935 to 1947, noting that "the voice and attitude suggest an eager, exuberant teen-ager overflowing with talent, more swinging than wistful", and highlighting the relatively small amount of "Tin Pan Alley dross" recorded during this period. Renee Doruyter of The Province recommended it as an example of "non-holiday CDs that would make dandy gifts". People considered it as "a feast" for Garland fans, describing her voice as combining "youthful exuberance and exhilaration and unforced toughness", with "easy and natural" phrasing and "pure radiance", while highlighting "The Jitterbug" and the original soundtrack recordings from The Harvey Girls and Meet Me in St. Louis.

== Accolades ==
The box set was nominated for Best Historical Album at the 37th Annual Grammy Awards in 1995. The nomination placed Garland alongside renowned artists such as Andrés Segovia (A Centenary Celebration), Louis Armstrong (Portrait of the Artist as a Young Man, 1923–1934), Tommy Dorsey & Frank Sinatra (The Song Is You), and the winner Ella Fitzgerald (The Complete Ella Fitzgerald Song Books on Verve).

Awards and nominations for The Complete Decca Masters (plus)
Year	Award	Category	Result	Ref.
1995	37th Annual Grammy Awards	Best Historical Album	Nominated	

== Commercial performance ==
According to Scott Schechter's book Judy Garland: The Day-by-Day Chronicle of a Legend, the box set sold "incredible well" with reported sales between 15,000-20,000 copies.

== Track listing ==
=== The Complete Decca Masters (plus) ===
Disc One [1936–1940]
No.	Title	Writer(s)	Length
1.	"Stompin' at the Savoy"	Benny Goodman; Chick Webb; Edgar Sampson; Andy Razaf	2:22
2.	"Swing Mister Charlie"	J. Russell Robinson; Harry Taylor; Harry Brooks	3:01
3.	"Everybody Sing"	Nacio Herb Brown; Arthur Freed	2:51
4.	"All God's Chillun Got Rhythm"	Gus Kahn; Walter Jurmann; Bronisław Kaper	3:04
5.	"Dear Mr. Gable: You Made Me Love You"	Joe McCarthy; James V. Monaco	3:09
6.	"You Can't Have Ev'rything"	Harold Revel; Mack Gordon	2:27
7.	"Cry, Baby, Cry"	Jimmy Eaton; Sammy Cahn; Saul Chaplin	2:31
8.	"Sleep My Baby Sleep"	Edward Pola; Franz Vienna	3:07
9.	"It Never Rains, But What It Pours"	Harry Revel; Mack Gordon	2:32
10.	"Ten Pins in the Sky"	McCarthy; Milton Ager	3:05
11.	"Over the Rainbow"	Harold Arlen; E.Y. Harburg	2:47
12.	"The Jitterbug"	Arlen; Harburg	2:43
13.	"In Between"	Roger Edens	4:03
14.	"Sweet Sixteen"	Jack Barnett	4:18
15.	"Zing! Went the Strings of My Heart"	James F. Hanley	2:56
16.	"Fascinating Rhythm"	George Gershwin; Ira Gershwin	2:51
17.	"I'm Just Wild About Harry"	Eubie Blake; Noble Sissle	1:58
18.	"Oceans Apart"	Mickey Rooney; Sidney Miller	3:05
19.	"Figaro"	Roger Edens	2:14
20.	"Embraceable You"	George Gershwin; Ira Gershwin	2:48
21.	"Swanee"	Gershwin; Irving Caesar	2:11
22.	"Buds Won't Bud"	Harold Arlen; E.Y. Harburg	3:05
23.	"I'm Nobody's Baby"	Milton Ager; Benny Davis; Lester Santly	2:53

Disc Two [1940–1945]
No.	Title	Writer(s)	Length
1.	"(Can This Be) The End of the Rainbow"	Sammy Cahn; Saul Chaplin	3:01
2.	"Wearing of the Green"	Traditional	2:41
3.	"Friendship"	Cole Porter	2:31
4.	"Our Love Affair"	Roger Edens; Arthur Freed	2:55
5.	"I'm Always Chasing Rainbows"	Harry Carroll; Joseph McCarthy	2:59
6.	"It's a Great Day for the Irish"	Roger Edens	2:25
7.	"A Pretty Girl Milking Her Cow"	Traditional; arr. Roger Edens	2:35
8.	"The Birthday of a King"	W. H. Neidlinger	3:08
9.	"The Star of the East"	Amanda Kennedy; George Cooper	3:06
10.	"How About You?"	Burton Lane; Ralph Freed	2:58
11.	"F.D.R. Jones"	Harold Rome	2:29
12.	"Blues in the Night (My Mama Done Tol' Me)"	Harold Arlen; Johnny Mercer	3:03
13.	"Poor You"	E.Y. Harburg; Burton Lane	2:36
14.	"The Last Call for Love"	Burton Lane; E.Y. Harburg; Margery Cummings	3:05
15.	"On the Sunny Side of the Street"	Jimmy McHugh; Dorothy Fields	2:31
16.	"Poor Little Rich Girl"	Noël Coward	3:03
17.	"That Old Black Magic"	Harold Arlen; Johnny Mercer	2:42
18.	"I Never Knew (I Could Love Anybody Like I'm Loving You)"	Tom Pitts; Raymond B. Egan; Roy K. Marsh; Paul Whiteman	2:21
19.	"No Love, No Nothin'"	Harry Warren; Leo Robin	3:05
20.	"A Journey to a Star"	Harry Warren; Leo Robin	2:42
21.	"This Heart of Mine"	Harry Warren; Arthur Freed	3:12
22.	"Love"	Hugh Martin; Ralph Blane	3:23

Disc Three [1942–1945]
No.	Title	Writer(s)	Length
1.	"For Me and My Gal" (duet with Gene Kelly)	George W. Meyer; Edgar Leslie; E. Ray Goetz	2:29
2.	"When You Wore a Tulip (And I Wore a Big Red Rose)" (duet with Gene Kelly)	Percy Wenrich; Jack Mahoney	2:35
3.	"Embraceable You"	George Gershwin; Ira Gershwin	3:11
4.	"Could You Use Me?" (duet with Mickey Rooney)	George Gershwin; Ira Gershwin	3:01
5.	"But Not for Me"	George Gershwin; Ira Gershwin	3:07
6.	"Bidin' My Time"	George Gershwin; Ira Gershwin	3:05
7.	"I Got Rhythm"	George Gershwin; Ira Gershwin	2:49
8.	"Meet Me in St. Louis"	Andrew B. Sterling; Kerry Mills	2:13
9.	"The Boy Next Door"	Hugh Martin; Ralph Blane	3:03
10.	"Skip to My Lou"	Traditional	2:58
11.	"Boys and Girls Like You"	Roger Edens; Oscar Hammerstein II	3:08
12.	"The Trolley Song"	Hugh Martin; Ralph Blane	2:52
13.	"Have Yourself a Merry Little Christmas"	Hugh Martin; Ralph Blane	2:42
14.	"In the Valley"	Hugh Martin; Ralph Blane	2:50
15.	"On the Atchison, Topeka and the Santa Fe"	Harry Warren; Johnny Mercer	5:51
16.	"It's a Great Big World"	Harry Warren; Johnny Mercer	3:41
17.	"Swing Your Partner Round and Round"	Harry Warren; Johnny Mercer	2:56
18.	"March of the Doagies"	Harry Warren; Johnny Mercer	2:55
19.	"You've Got Me Where You Want Me" (duet with Bing Crosby)	Harry Warren; Johnny Mercer	2:50
20.	"Mine" (duet with Bing Crosby)	George Gershwin; Ira Gershwin	2:45
21.	"Connecticut" (duet with Bing Crosby)	Hugh Martin; Ralph Blane	3:10
22.	"Yah-Ta-Ta, Yah-Ta-Ta (Talk, Talk, Talk)" (duet with Bing Crosby)	Johnny Burke; Jimmy Van Heusen	3:08

CD 4: 1945-1947
No.	Title	Writer(s)	Length
1.	"On the Atchison, Topeka and the Santa Fe"	Harry Warren; Johnny Mercer	3:07
2.	"If I Had You"	Jimmy Campbell; Reg Connelly; Ted Shapiro	3:19
3.	"Smilin' Through"	Arthur A. Penn	3:07
4.	"You'll Never Walk Alone"	Richard Rodgers; Oscar Hammerstein II	3:17
5.	"For You, for Me, for Evermore"	George Gershwin; Ira Gershwin	3:12
6.	"Aren't You Kind of Glad We Did?"	George Gershwin; Ira Gershwin	3:02
7.	"Changing My Tune"	George Gershwin; Ira Gershwin	3:02
8.	"There Is No Breeze (To Cool the Flame of Love)"	Alex Alstone; Dorothy Dick	3:11
9.	"Don't Tell Me That Story"	Joseph J. Lilley	2:57
10.	"I Wish I Were in Love Again"	Lorenz Hart; Richard Rodgers	2:45
11.	"Nothing But You"	Lorenz Hart; Richard Rodgers	2:50
12.	"Falling in Love with Love"	Lorenz Hart; Richard Rodgers	2:44
13.	"I Got Rhythm"	George Gershwin; Ira Gershwin	2:53
14.	"Embraceable You"	George Gershwin; Ira Gershwin	3:10
15.	"Blues in the Night (My Mama Done Tol' Me)"	Harold Arlen; Johnny Mercer	3:06
16.	"I'm Always Chasing Rainbows"	Harry Carroll; Joseph McCarthy	3:00
17.	"Connecticut"	Hugh Martin; Ralph Blane	3:11
18.	"If I Had You"	Jimmy Campbell; Reg Connelly; Ted Shapiro	3:19
19.	"Don't Tell Me That Story"	Joseph J. Lilley	2:41
20.	"This Heart of Mine"	Harry Warren; Arthur Freed	3:17
21.	"Yah-Ta-Ta, Yah-Ta-Ta (Talk, Talk, Talk)"	Johnny Burke; Jimmy Van Heusen	3:11
22.	"Have Yourself a Merry Little Christmas"	Hugh Martin; Ralph Blane	2:47
23.	"I Wish I Were in Love Again"	Lorenz Hart; Richard Rodgers	2:52

== Personnel ==
Credits adapted from The Complete Decca Masters (plus) box set.

- Produced by Ron O'Brien
- Executive Producer: Andy McKaie
- Producer (riginal Recordings): Dave Kapp, Jack Kapp, Joe Perry
- Remastered by Paul Elmore, Robert Stoughton
- Transferred by (Digital Transfer) Steven Lasker
- Art Direction: Vartan
- Design: DZN/N Ung
- Photo Coordination: Geary Chansley
- Liner notes by Ron O'Brien
