= Easter Parade (soundtrack) =

Soundtrack album
- Released: 1948 or early 1949
- Genre: Show tunes
- Label: MGM

Judy Garland chronology
Words and Music (1948)	Easter Parade (1949)	Judy Garland Third Souvenir Album (1949)

Fred Astaire chronology
Blue Skies (1946)	Easter Parade (1949)	Three Little Words (1950)

Professional ratings
Review scores
Source	Rating
Billboard	72/100
AllMusic	(1995 reissue)

The original soundtrack to the film Easter Parade was released by MGM Records as a set of four 10-inch 78-rpm phonograph records and as a 10-inch 33-rpm long-play. The soundtrack featured songs performed by Judy Garland, Fred Astaire, Peter Lawford, Ann Miller and played by the Johnny Green Orchestra.

Billboard reviewed the album in its issue from 12 March 1949, giving it 72 points out of 100 (which indicated a "good" rating) and writing: "No subtle delineations here — no subtle singers, either — but forthright lyric bawling in the approved musical comedy tradition. The score is fair ranging from great old ones like 'Easter Parade' and 'Choo Choo" to the passable recent plug additions like 'It Only Happens' and 'Steppin' Out.'" The review concluded with: "Album doesn't figure to be a world-beater, but should have a fair sale to movie fans, Berlin followers and admirers of Fred Astaire and the other non-singing singers represented here."

== Track listing ==
10-inch long-play record (MGM Records E-502)

Side 1
No.	Title	Artist(s)	Length
1.	"Easter Parade"	Judy Garland and Fred Astaire
2.	"A Couple of Swells"	Judy Garland and Fred Astaire
3.	"Better Luck Next Time"	Judy Garland
4.	"Steppin' Out with My Baby"	Fred Astaire

Side 2
No.	Title	Artist(s)	Length
1.	"A Fella with an Umbrella"	Judy Garland and Peter Lawford
2.	"I Love a Piano" – "Snooky Ookums" – "When the Midnight Choo Choo Leaves for Alabam'"	Judy Garland and Fred Astaire
3.	"It Only Happens When I Dance with You"	Fred Astaire
4.	"Shakin' the Blues Away"	Ann Miller
