= For the Dear Old Flag, I Die =

Song
- Language: English
- Genre: American Civil War song
- Composer(s): Stephen Foster
- Lyricist(s): George Cooper

For The Dear Old Flag, I Die is an American Civil War song. It was originally a poem written by George Cooper. The music by Stephen Foster was later added in. The song interprets the last words of a drummer boy who was fatally wounded at the Battle of Gettysburg.

Verse 1
For the dear old Flag I die,
Said the wounded drummer boy;
Mother, press your lips to mine;
O, they bring me peace and joy!
'Tis the last time on earth
I shall ever see your face
Mother take me to your heart,
Let me die in your embrace.

(Chorus)
For the dear old Flag I die,
Mother, dry your weeping eye;
For the honor of our land
And the dear old Flag I die,

Verse 2
Do not mourn, my mother, dear,
Every pang will soon be o'er;
For I hear the angel band
Calling from their starry shore;
Now I see their banners wave
In the light of perfect day,
though 'tis hard to part with you,
Yet I would not wish to stay.

(Chorus)
For the dear old Flag I die,
Mother, dry your weeping eye;
For the honor of our land
And the dear old Flag I die.

Verse 3
Farewell mother, Death's cold hand
Weighs upon my spirit now,
And I feel his blighting breath
Fan my pallid cheek and brow.
Closer! closer! to your heart,
Let me feel that you are by,
While my sight is growing dim,
For the dear old Flag I die.

(Chorus)
For the dear old Flag I die,
Mother, dry your weeping eye;
For the honor of our land
And the dear old Flag I die.

== Fiction ==
In the 2015 video game Hotline Miami 2: Wrong Number, a shortened version of the poem is included in the end credits of the game when the game is completed on Hard Mode.
