= Judy Garland Souvenir Album (1949) =

Compilation album by Judy Garland
- Released: 1949
- Recorded: 1939–1945
- Label: Decca

Judy Garland chronology
Easter Parade (1949)	Judy Garland Third Souvenir Album (1949)	Summer Stock (1950)

Professional ratings
Review scores
Source	Rating
AllMusic	3/5 stars
Billboard	65/100

Judy Garland Souvenir Album (also known as Judy Garland Third Souvenir Album) is the third compilation album by Judy Garland, released in 1949 by Decca Records.

According to the retrospective AllMusic review, Decca issued this album wanting to take advantage of the new LP format. Since by that time Garland's contract with the record label was moot, the album was made by taking the Judy Garland Second Souvenir Album from 1943, excluding two tracks – "For Me and My Gal" and "When You Wore a Tulip" – and instead adding two newer tracks – the two sides of the singer's 1945 single "This Heart of Mine" / "Love" – at the end.

Billboard gave the album a score of 65 out of 100, indicating a satisfactory reception. According to the magazine the album features a collection of eight songs, some of which were previously released as singles. However, the review notes a lack of enthusiasm and energy in Garland's vocal delivery, with certain phrases lacking drive and expressiveness.

== Track listing ==
The album was originally issued in 1949, in at least two formats: as a 33-r.p.m. long-playing record and as a set of four 10-inch 78-r.p.m. records (cat. no. A-671).

No.	Title	Length
1.	"Zing! Went the Strings of My Heart"	2:54
2.	"Fascinating Rhythm"	2:51
3.	"Never Knew (I Could Love Anybody like I'm Loving You)"	2:19
4.	"On the Sunny Side of the Street"	2:36
5.	"That Old Black Magic"	2:37
6.	"Poor Little Rich Girl"	3:05
7.	"This Heart of Mine"	3:13
8.	"Love"	3:22
