= I Love a Piano =

1920 song

"I Love a Piano" is a popular song with words and music by Irving Berlin. It was copyrighted on December 9, 1920, and introduced in the Broadway musical revue Stop! Look! Listen! when it was performed by Harry Fox and the ensemble. The song received a tremendous boost in the show because the set consisted of an enormous keyboard running completely across the stage. In front of this were six pianos with six pianists playing the tune. Irving Berlin always regarded the song as one of his best efforts. In June 2026, CBS News included Judy Garland's rendition of the song in its list of the 250 essential American songs of the past 250 years.

== Notable recordings ==
- It was recorded for Victor Records (catalog No. 17945) by Billy Murray on January 5, 1916 and this enjoyed great success.
- The top British recording was by Ethel Levey on the His Master's Voice label on 13 April 1916.
- Joe Bushkin for his album I Love a Piano (1950).
- Benny Fields & Blossom Seeley - included in the album Two-a-Day at the Palace (1957)
- Tony Bennett - for MTV Unplugged (1994)

== Popular culture ==
- "I Love a Piano" was one of the songs featured in the film Easter Parade, as sung by Judy Garland.
- Andy Williams and Kermit the Frog - on The Muppet Show, Episode 4x22, as part of their duet medley (1980)
