= Duets (Judy Garland album) =

Compilation album by Judy Garland
- Released: 1998
- Recorded: 1963–1964 (Duets); February 24, 1952 (Judy at the Palace)
- Label: BCD USA

Judy Garland chronology
Judy (1998)	Duets (1998)	Classic Judy Garland – The Capitol Years: 1955–1965 (2002)

Duets (subtitled The Platinum Judy Garland in Commemoration of Her 75th Birthday on the cover and Duets: The Platinum Celebration of Judy Garland on the spine) is a compilation album by American singer Judy Garland, released in 1998. The two-CD set combines 15 duets from The Judy Garland Show (1963–1964), featuring Garland alongside performers including Barbra Streisand, Count Basie, Bobby Darin, Ethel Merman, Tony Bennett and Liza Minnelli, with a recording of her February 24, 1952, concert at the Palace Theatre in New York City. The television performances had been missing for decades before the recordings were rediscovered in 1993, while the concert recording was made by Garland's then-husband, Sid Luft, during the final night of her engagement at the theatre.

The album received favorable reviews, with critics praising Garland's performances, the sound quality of the recordings and the collaborations featured on the television disc. The Palace Theatre concert was also commended, particularly its renditions of "Liza" and "Over the Rainbow".

== Background and album details ==
The two-CD Duets combines 15 duets from The Judy Garland Show (1963–1964) with the 1952 Palace Theatre concert. The video recordings and accompanying audio from the television series had been missing for several decades before they were discovered in 1993. Sid Luft (Garland' ex-husband) received a telephone call from a young man named Billy, who offered to return the tapes and kinescopes of The Judy Garland Show in exchange for $250,000. The young man had discovered the material in the basement of his grandmother's house in northern New Jersey after her death. His stepfather subsequently turned the recordings over to Luft, who paid the young man $10,000. The collection brings together 15 duets from the television series, featuring Garland with performers including Barbra Streisand, Mickey Rooney, Count Basie, Bobby Darin, Jack Jones, Ethel Merman, Vic Damone, Peggy Lee, Mel Tormé, Tony Bennett and Liza Minnelli, as well as a performance with Frank Sinatra and Dean Martin as a trio.

The Judy at the Palace concert was recorded on February 24, 1952, during the closing night of Judy Garland's comeback engagement at the Palace Theatre in New York City. The recording was made by Luft, who used a tape deck given to them by Bing Crosby. Luft connected the deck to Garland's main microphone and ran a wire to the machine in her dressing-room bathroom, unaware that the recording would eventually become a historical document of the performance. He nearly forgot about the tape until 1992, when an earthquake in Los Angeles knocked his old electronic equipment out of a cabinet. After having the machinery repaired, he played the tapes and discovered that the recording had retained surprisingly high sound quality.

In March 1999, attorney Richard Perlman stated that the rights to Duets belonged to BCD USA Inc./Intermusic SA, not Sid Luft, who had helped promote the release. Cakewalk Production Inc. and Classic World Inc. claimed to have purchased the U.S. rights from Luft for $1.65 million in 1997, but Perlman disputed the payment. A 1998 settlement ordered Cakewalk to pay Luft $900,000 in exchange for the U.S. copyrights.

== Critical reception ==
Professional ratings
Review scores
Source	Rating
AllMusic	4/5 stars
The Encyclopedia of Popular Music	(Get Happy)

JT Griffith of AllMusic wrote that the Duets CD would "stun" listeners, that Garland "shows no sign of vulnerability or weakness" in her duets with prominent performers, and that the songs "all shine". About the live CD, he praised the performances of "Over the Rainbow" and "Liza", describing both as "homeruns". Overall, Griffith described the sound quality as "fabulous" and called both discs "very important material" that had been preserved and made available to the public.

The Advocate praised the collection's "singular collaborations", highlighting the duet between Garland and Barbra Streisand as "a seismic blast". Reviewing Judy at the Palace, the magazine described Garland as capable of holding "soul-stirring notes for days" and called her "the greatest musical star of them all", noting the "sweet intimacy" of her interaction with the audience. Playbill described Garland's engagement at the Palace Theatre as "legendary", writing that it "momentarily revive[d] the glory days of vaudeville". The review praised her performances of the "Palace Medley" and the MGM "Olio" medley, describing "Liza" as "ravishing" and "Over the Rainbow" as potentially "Judy's best ever".

== Track listing ==
Duets – Disc 1
No.	Title	Writer(s)	Featuring	Length
1.	"I Hear Music / The Sweetest Sounds / Strike Up the Band"	Burton Lane; Frank Loesser; Richard Rodgers; George Gershwin; Ira Gershwin	Count Basie	3:30
2.	"You're So Right for Me"	Ray Evans; Jay Livingston	Mickey Rooney	3:14
3.	"Get Happy / Happy Days Are Here Again"	Milton Ager; Harold Arlen; Ted Koehler; Jack Yellen	Barbra Streisand	3:22
4.	"'Hooray for Love' Medley" (Hooray for Love / After You've Gone / By Myself / 'S Wonderful / How About You? / Lover, Come Back to Me / You and the Night and the Music / It All Depends on You)	Arlen; Leo Robin; Turner Layton; Henry Creamer; Arthur Schwartz; Howard Dietz; G. Gershwin; I. Gershwin; Burton Lane; Ralph Freed; Sigmund Romberg; Oscar Hammerstein II; Arthur Schwartz; Howard Dietz; Ray Henderson; Buddy G. DeSylva; Lew Brown	Barbra Streisand	4:42
5.	"'Goin' Home' Medley" (Sentimental Journey / Going Home Train / Blues in the Night / Goin' Home / Chattanooga Choo Choo / On the Atchison, Topeka and the Santa Fe / River Stay 'Way from My Door / Some of These Days / Bye Bye Blackbird / Toot, Toot, Tootsie, Goodbye / Beyond the Blue Horizon / I Know That You Know] / I've Been Working on the Railroad / The Lonesome Road)	Les Brown; Ben Homer; Harold Rome; Harold Arlen; Johnny Mercer; William Arms Fisher; Mack Gordon; Harry Warren; Harry Warren; Johnny Mercer; Harry M. Woods; Mort Dixon; Shelton Brooks; Ray Henderson; Mort Dixon; Gus Kahn; Ernie Erdman; Danny Russo; Leo Robin; Richard A. Whiting; W. Franke Harling; Vincent Youmans; Anne Caldwell; Traditional; Nathaniel Shilkret; Gene Austin	Bobby Darin	9:22
6.	"The Trolley Song"	Ralph Blane; Hugh Martin	Mel Tormé	2:14
7.	"'Nelson Eddy–Jeanette MacDonald' Medley" (San Francisco / Will You Remember (Sweetheart) / Rosalie / I'll See You Again / Lover, Come Back to Me / The Donkey Serenade)	Bronislaw Kaper; Walter Jurmann; Gus Kahn; Sigmund Romberg; Rida Johnson Young; Cole Porter; Noël Coward; Sigmund Romberg; Oscar Hammerstein II; Bob Wright; Chet Forrest; Herbert Stothart; Rudolf Friml	Jack Jones	8:02
8.	"'Friendship' Medley" (Friendship / Let's Be Buddies / You're the Top / You're Just in Love / It's De-Lovely / Together (Wherever We Go))	Cole Porter; Jule Styne; Stephen Sondheim	Ethel Merman	4:47
9.	"You're Nobody till Somebody Loves You / Let There Be Love"	James Cavanaugh; Russ Morgan; Larry Stock; Lionel Rand; Ian Grant	Frank Sinatra; Dean Martin	2:21
10.	"'I Left My Heart in San Francisco' Medley" (I Left My Heart in San Francisco)	George Cory; Douglass Cross	Tony Bennett	2:59
11.	"Day In, Day Out"	Rube Bloom; Johnny Mercer	Lena Horne	3:48
12.	"'I Like Men' Medley" (I Like Men / You Make Me Feel So Young / Tess's Torch Song (I Had a Man) / Fever / [It's So Nice to Have a Man Around the House / I'm Just Wild About Harry / Charley, My Boy / Oh, Johnny / Big Bad Bill (Is Sweet William Now) / Bill Bailey, Won't You Please Come Home)	Peggy Lee; Jack Marshall; Josef Myrow; Mack Gordon; Harold Arlen; Ted Koehler; Eddie Cooley; Otis Blackwell; Harold Spina; Jack Elliot; Noble Sissle; Eubie Blake; Ted Fio Rito; Gus Kahn; Abe Olman; Ed Rose; Milton Ager; Jack Yellen; Hughie Cannon	Peggy Lee	4:53
13.	"'West Side Story' Medley" (Maria / Something's Coming / Maria / Somewhere / Tonight)	Leonard Bernstein; Stephen Sondheim	Vic Damone	7:12
14.	"We Could Make Such Beautiful Music Together / The Best Is Yet to Come"	Henry Katzman; Robert Sour; Cy Coleman; Carolyn Leigh	Liza Minnelli	4:30
15.	"Together Wherever We Go"	Jule Styne; Stephen Sondheim	Liza Minnelli	1:20

Judy at the Palace – Disc 2
No.	Title	Writer(s)	Length
1.	"Chorus Intro"	Roger Edens	1:56
2.	"Call the Press"	Roger Edens	3:25
3.	"Judy at the Palace Medley" (Shine on Harvest Moon / Some of These Days / My Man / I Don't Care)	Nora Bayes; Jack Norworth; Shelton Brooks; Jean Lenox; Harry O. Sutton	7:33
4.	"Rock-a-Bye Your Baby with a Dixie Melody"	Sam M. Lewis; Jean Schwartz; Joe Young	5:13
5.	"Judy's Olio" (You Made Me Love You (I Didn't Want to Do It) / For Me and My Gal / The Boy Next Door / The Trolley Song)	James V. Monaco; Joseph McCarthy; George W. Meyer; Edgar Leslie; E. Ray Goetz; Hugh Martin; Ralph Blane	6:46
6.	"Chorus"		1:36
7.	"Get Happy"	Harold Arlen; Ted Koehler	2:50
8.	"Chorus"		2:11
9.	"A Couple of Swells"	Irving Berlin	6:20
10.	"Love (Encore)"		2:49
11.	"A Pretty Girl Milking Her Cow (Encore)"	Roger Edens	3:48
12.	"Liza (Encore)"	George Gershwin; Ira Gershwin; Gus Kahn	4:14
13.	"Auld Lang Syne (Audience) (Encore)"	Robert Burns; Traditional	0:57
14.	"After You've Gone (Encore)"	Henry Creamer; Turner Layton	3:24
15.	"Over the Rainbow (Encore)"	Harold Arlen; E. Y. Harburg	5:22

== Personnel ==
Credits adapted from Duets CD.

- Produced by Doug Schwartz
- Licensed by BCD USA from Wiley Entertainment, Ltd.
- Design: Edward Fuentes and Jennifer Rzepka
- Photo by Richard Avedon
