= Star of the East (song) =

Christmas carol

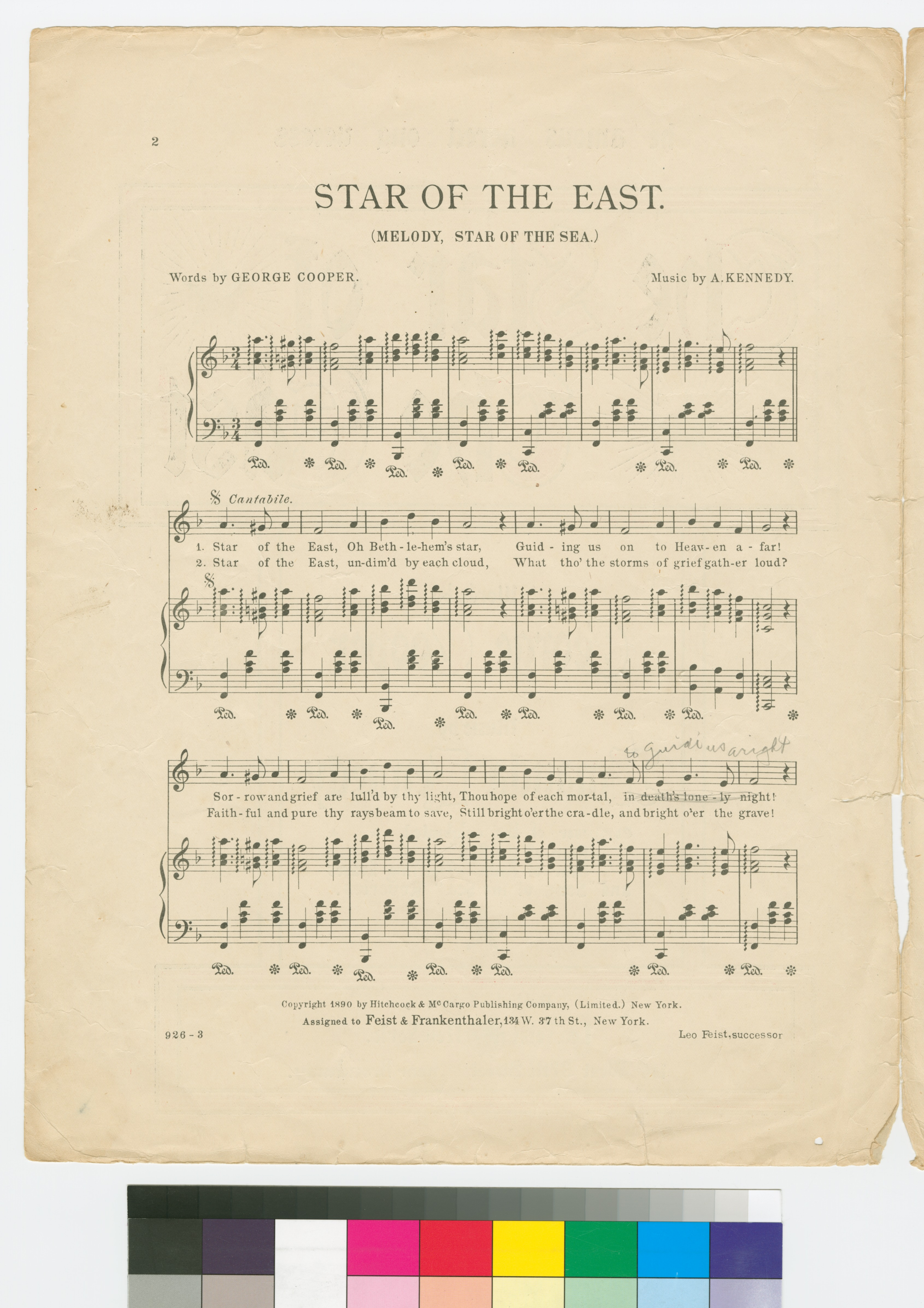
- NYPL Hades-446549-1658174

Song
- Published: 1890
- Genre: Christmas carol
- Composer: Amanda Kennedy
- Lyricist: George Cooper

Audio sample
- A 1920 recording by Gladys Rice and Stellar Quartette: file; help

"Star of the East", originally named "Stern über Bethlehem" is a popular Christmas carol written in the 1800s.

The words were written by New York lyricist George Cooper in 1890. The music was arranged by composer Amanda Kennedy in 1883, for a song called "Star of the Sea". It is not to be confused with several similarly named carols, including an American folk carol named "Star in the East" and an English carol titled "Star of the East" or "Brightest and Best".

Judy Garland recorded the song in 1941.

== Lyrics ==
Star of the East, Oh Bethlehem's star,
Guiding us on to Heaven afar!
Sorrow and grief and lull'd by thy light,
Thou hope of each mortal, in death's lonely night!

Fearless and tranquil, we look up to Thee!
Knowing thou beam'st thro' eternity!
Help us to follow where Thou still dost guide,
Pilgrims of earth so wide.

Star of the East, thou hope of the soul,
While round us here the dark billows roll,
Lead us from sin to glory afar,
Thou star of the East, thou sweet Bethlehem's star.

Star of the East, un-dim'd by each cloud,
What tho' the storms of grief gather loud?
Faithful and pure thy rays beam to save,
Still bright o'er the cradle, and bright o'er the grave!

Smiles of a Saviour are mirror'd in Thee!
Glimpses of Heav'n in thy light we see!
Guide us still onward to that blessed shore,
After earth's toil is o'er!

Star of the East, thou hope of the soul,
While round us here the dark billows roll,
Lead us from sin to glory afar,
Thou star of the East, thou sweet Bethlehem's star.

Oh star that leads to God above!
Whose rays are peace and joy and love!
Watch o'er us still till life hath ceased,
Beam on, bright star, sweet Bethlehem star!

== See also ==
- List of Christmas carols
