= It Only Happens When I Dance with You =

Single by Fred Astaire

from the album Easter Parade
- B-side: "Better Luck Next Time" by Judy Garland
- Released: 1949 {UK}
- Label: MGM
- Songwriter: Irving Berlin

Music video
- "It Only Happens When I Dance with You" on YouTube

"It Only Happens When I Dance with You"

Single by Frank Sinatra
- B-side: "A Fella with an Umbrella"
- Released: 1948
- Label: Columbia

"It Only Happens When I Dance with You" is a song written by Irving Berlin and introduced by Fred Astaire in the 1948 MGM musical film Easter Parade.

== Background ==
In the film Easter Parade, first Fred Astaire sings the song to Ann Miller, and later Judy Garland sings it to Fred Astaire.

As Philip Furia and Laurie Patterson note in their book The Poets of Tin Pan Alley, during the Astaire and Miller scene spectators are meant to realize that "the couple's magic can never be recaptured".

The book Tap Dancing America describes Miller as dancing "with a dreamlike grace", despite the fact that she was too tall for Astaire at 5-foot-7 and had to wear her "ballet slippers".

== Releases ==
As recorded by Fred Astaire, the song was released as a single in the UK, with "Better Luck Next Time" by Judy Garland on the flip side (cat. no. MGM.174).

Moreover, Frank Sinatra recorded the song for Columbia. It was released as a single coupled with another song from the same film, "A Fella with an Umbrella" (cat. no. 38192).
