= Great Day! Rare Recordings from the Judy Garland Show =

Great Day! Rare Recordings From The Judy Garland Show

Compilation album by Judy Garland
- Released: June 6, 2006

Great Day! Rare Recordings From The Judy Garland Show is a music CD by Judy Garland which was released on June 6, 2006. The compilation features 18 solo performances recorded for The Judy Garland Show, which aired from 1963 to 1964. Released by Savoy Jazz, it includes recordings of songs Garland had never or rarely performed during her career, including "Time After Time", "It's a Good Day" and "America the Beautiful", with compositions by Irving Berlin, Cole Porter, George Gershwin and Harold Arlen, most of the arrangements feature big-band swing and strings.

== Critical reception ==
Professional ratings
Review scores
Source	Rating
AllMusic	3/5 stars

John Bush of AllMusic wrote that, although Garland could carry a television audience with her performances, "there simply isn't enough excellent material to make an audio-only program interesting", adding that "most of the material here won't appeal to the generalist vocal fan". He also described "It's a Good Day" as "an excellent choice".

== Track listing ==
1. This Could Be the Start of Something
2. I Love You
3. Swing Low, Sweet Chariot / The Whole World In His Hands
4. Poor Butterfly
5. Steppin' Out with My Baby
6. When the Sun Comes Out
7. Make Someone Happy
8. Time After Time
9. A Lot of Livin' to Do
10. Don't Ever Leave Me
11. Lorna
12. It's a Good Day
13. World War I Medley
14. America the Beautiful
15. Seventy-Six Trombones
16. Suppertime
17. I'm on My Way
18. Great Day
