= Judy Garland Souvenir Album =

Compilation album by Judy Garland
- Released: 1940
- Label: Decca

Judy Garland chronology
The Wizard of Oz (1939)	Judy Garland Souvenir Album (1940)	Judy Garland Second Souvenir Album (1943)

Judy Garland Souvenir Album is the debut compilation album by Judy Garland. It was released in 1940, by Decca Records. The album includes six tracks, featuring two from her 1937 single "(Dear Mr. Gable) You Made Me Love You"/"You Can't Have Everything" and others recorded between 1937 and 1939.

Metro-Goldwyn-Mayer writer Roger Edens crafted four of the tracks for Garland, who was 17 years old at the time of the album's release, showcasing her transition from childhood with songs like "In Between" and "Sweet Sixteen."

== Critical reception ==
Professional ratings
Review scores
Source	Rating
AllMusic	3/5 stars
Billboard	65/100

A contemporary review from Billboard was critical of the album, stating that this assemblage of previously released singles "isn't a garland for special enthusiasm". The review noted that Garland's vocal flaws, often overlooked in her film performances, were noticeable on the recording, citing "bare, indifferent phrasing, lack of drive and a tendency to flat" as evident issues. However, the publication conceded that a "devoted core" of her film fans would still purchase the record, and that radio stations might find use for standards like "On the Sunny Side of the Street".

According to William Ruhlmann from AllMusic, the swing tune "Figaro" notably highlights Garland's ability to move beyond youthful performances, demonstrating the impressive range of her vocal talents.

== Track listing ==
The album was originally issued in 1940 as a set consisting of two 10-inch and one 12-inch 78-r.p.m. records (cat. no. 76).

Side 1
No.	Title	Length
1.	"Figaro"	2:20

Side 2
No.	Title	Length
1.	"Oceans Apart"	3:06

Side 3
No.	Title	Length
1.	"Dear Mr. Gable: You Made Me Love You"	3:08

Side 4
No.	Title	Length
1.	"You Can't Have Ev'rything"	2:29

Side 5
No.	Title	Length
1.	"In-Between"	4:02

Side 6
No.	Title	Length
1.	"Sweet Sixteen"	4:16
