= Judy (compilation album) =

Box set by Judy Garland
- Released: 1998
- Recorded: 1929–1969
- Label: 32 Records

Judy Garland chronology
Judy Garland in Hollywood: Her Greatest Movie Hits (1998)	Judy (1998)	Duets (1998)

Judy is a compilation album by American singer and actress Judy Garland, released in 1998 by 32 Records. The four-CD box set was produced by Joel Dorn and his son Adam Dorn, with assistance from Judy Garland fan Scott Schecter, and features 66 tracks spanning Garland's recording career from 1929 to 1969. It includes rare recordings, radio broadcasts, concert performances and material from The Judy Garland Show (1963–1964).

The release also includes a half-hour video of Garland's performances and a 100-page illustrated booklet featuring essays about her life and career. Critics praised the collection's breadth and its previously unheard recordings, although some faulted its selection of material, emphasis on the television series and high price.

== Background and album details ==
The four-CD box set Judy was produced by Joel Dorn, founder of the reissue and compilation label 32 Records, with his son Adam Dorn as co-producer. The project began after the label acquired recordings from The Judy Garland Show, following reports that the television programs' tapes were becoming available. Dorn said he had long wondered why no comprehensive overview of Garland's career had been released, and described the project as a significant responsibility, stating that "the responsibility that comes with looking at the life" of an artist such as Garland was "gigantic" because "you're dealing with somebody's life's work".

The four-CD box set Judy, was produced with assistance from Judy Garland fan Scott Schecter, and spans Garland's recording career from a 1929 recording to a 1969 London performance of "Over the Rainbow". It compiles recordings from various sources, including radio broadcasts, approximately 20 tracks licensed from other labels, and audio material from The Judy Garland Show (1963–1964). The first two CDs contain rarities, while the third and fourth feature performances from the television series, including appearances by Bobby Darin, Liza Minnelli, Tony Bennett, Barbra Streisand, Count Basie, Peggy Lee and Ray Bolger. The set also includes a half-hour VHS tape of video performances and a 100-page illustrated booklet containing five essays about Garland.

== Critical reception ==
Professional ratings
Review scores
Source	Rating
AllMusic	4.5/5 stars
The Baltimore Sun	3/5 stars
The News-Sentinel	B+ (Novice); A (Collector); A- (Overall)

Billboard praised Judy for going "deeper" than previous retrospectives in representing the "breadth" of Garland's "multifaceted career", calling the collection "a wonderful tribute to an American legend". AllMusic praised the box set for its "intriguing rarities" and broader scope than previous Judy Garland collections but unnecessarily long and its price "rather high for the contents". The review also criticized its disproportionate focus on The Judy Garland Show, describing the collection as "a kind of audio-visual scrapbook" and "an overgrown compilation" of the series. The News-Sentinel considered it "Definitely the classiest looking box of the season".

Playbill praised the box set as "a fine introduction for younger people just discovering her" and highlighted Garland's ability to share a song with her listeners rather than merely perform it, writing that "that's abundantly on display here". The New York Times critic Stephen Holden praised Judy for capturing the "breadth" of Garland's recording career, highlighting highlighted her performances of "The Man That Got Away" and "Through the Years", and describing the collection as "powerful stuff" that showed how she "more than lived up to her nickname" of "Miss Show Business". The Washington Post described the collection as "fascinating".

The ARSC Journal described Judy as a "well-intentioned monument" to Garland's artistry but argued that producers Joel and Adam Dorn had "gone astray by the intensity of their enthusiasm". The review praised the The Judy Garland Show recordings as "vibrant" and "far superior to previous television reissues", but criticized the earlier material selection as "slim pickings" and the compilation as "imbalanced". It also faulted the omission of portions of performances, the VHS transfer's reduced picture quality, and the set's high price, concluding that the release offered "a bastard mix of incomplete anthologizing, television excerpts, and low-grade VHS". The Baltimore Sun considered that the compilation "gives a remarkably well-rounded accounting of Garland's strengths and successes", while described the packaging as "[s]tylish but fussy, with a slightly too complicated slipcase".

The Sun Sentinel described Judy as a "fitting tribute" to Garland's career and said the collection "fulfills its mission wonderfully". It singled out "You'll Never Walk Alone" as "a triumphant moment" and described "A Cottage for Sale" as "priceless". Although the reviewer noted that "many of the omissions" could be questioned, the review praised the closing "Over the Rainbow" as a performance of "almost unbearable poignancy". Michael Feingold of The Village Voice described Judy as "an obsessive product" that offered "the revelations such thoroughness always provides". He praised the previously unheard recordings for their "newly frank emotionality", but criticized the accompanying booklet's "hilariously lamebrained" essay by Camille Paglia.

== Track listing ==
Judy – Disc 1
No.	Title	Writer(s)	Featuring	Length
1.	"The History of My Life Is in My Songs"	Roger Edens		0:42
2.	"Blue Butterfly"	Harold C. Berg; M. K. Jerome		0:49
3.	"Hang Onto a Rainbow"	Bud Green; Sam H. Stept		1:04
4.	"When the Butterflies Kiss the Buttercups Goodbye"	Harold C. Berg; M. K. Jerome	Vocals: The Gumm Sisters	1:14
5.	"The Land of Let's Pretend"	Harry B. Smith; Jerome Kern	Vocals: The Gumm Sisters	0:23
6.	"Introduction by Wallace Beery"		MC: Wallace Beery	0:48
7.	"Zing! Went the Strings of My Heart"	James F. Hanley		3:31
8.	"Stompin' at the Savoy"	Andy Razaf; Benny Goodman; Chick Webb; Edgar Sampson		2:22
9.	"Everybody Sing"	Arthur Freed; Nacio Herb Brown		2:51
10.	"(Dear Mr. Gable) You Made Me Love You"	Joseph McCarthy; James V. Monaco		3:09
11.	"I'm Feelin' Like a Million"	Arthur Freed; Nacio Herb Brown	Piano: Roger Edens	2:50
12.	"Over the Rainbow"	E. Y. Harburg; Harold Arlen	With: Yip Harburg; Harold Arlen	2:51
13.	"Over the Rainbow"	E. Y. Harburg; Harold Arlen		2:14
14.	"All the Things You Are"	Jerome Kern; Oscar Hammerstein II		3:00
15.	"I'm Nobody's Baby"	Benny Davis; Lester Santly; Milton Ager		2:53
16.	"For Me and My Gal"	E. Ray Goetz; Edgar Leslie; George W. Meyer	With: Gene Kelly	2:29
17.	"The Trolley Song"	Hugh Martin; Ralph Blane		2:49
18.	"Liza"	Ira Gershwin; Gus Kahn; George Gershwin		3:34
19.	"I've Got You Under My Skin"	Cole Porter		3:10
20.	"Over the Rainbow"	E. Y. Harburg; Harold Arlen	With: Al Jolson; Oscar Levant	0:48

Judy – Disc 2
No.	Title	Writer(s)	Featuring	Length
1.	"Get Happy"	Harold Arlen; Ted Koehler		2:46
2.	"The Man That Got Away"	Harold Arlen; Ira Gershwin		4:20
3.	"Swanee"	George Gershwin; Irving Caesar; Kirby Shaw	Arranged by: Kirby Shaw	1:35
4.	"Danny Boy"	Fred E. Weatherly		2:24
5.	"Come Rain or Come Shine"	Johnny Mercer; Harold Arlen	Arranged and conducted by: Nelson Riddle	3:40
6.	"How About Me"	Irving Berlin	Arranged by: Gordon Jenkins	3:37
7.	"Me and My Shadow"	Al Jolson; Billy Rose; Dave Dreyer	Arranged by: Gordon Jenkins	3:37
8.	"Zing! Went the Strings of My Heart"	James F. Hanley	Arranged by: Nelson Riddle	3:45
9.	"Who Cares (As Long as You Care for Me)"	George Gershwin; Ira Gershwin		1:27
10.	"You'll Never Walk Alone"	Richard Rodgers; Oscar Hammerstein II		4:01
11.	"Happiness Is a Thing Called Joe"	E. Y. Harburg; Harold Arlen		4:43
12.	"I Can't Give You Anything but Love (Baby)"	Dorothy Fields; Jimmy McHugh		6:33
13.	"Rock-a-Bye Your Baby (with a Dixie Melody)"	Jean Schwartz; Joe Young; Sam Lewis		3:01
14.	"Smile"	Charlie Chaplin; Geoffrey Parsons; John Turner		4:18

Judy – Disc 3
No.	Title	Writer(s)	Featuring	Length
1.	"Just in Time"	Betty Comden; Adolph Green; Jule Styne		3:17
2.	"What'll I Do"	Irving Berlin		1:42
3.	"The Lonesome Road"	Gene Austin; Nathaniel Shilkret	With: Bobby Darin	2:14
4.	"Here's That Rainy Day"	Johnny Burke; Jimmy Van Heusen		4:33
5.	"I Feel a Song Comin' On"	Gus Kahn; Jimmy McHugh; Dorothy Fields		2:06
6.	"Liza"	Ira Gershwin; George Gershwin; Gus Kahn		0:47
7.	"Together (Wherever We Go)"	Jule Styne; Stephen Sondheim	With: Liza Minnelli	1:09
8.	"Shenandoah"			3:44
9.	"On the Atchison, Topeka and the Santa Fe"	Harry Warren; Johnny Mercer		2:50
10.	"A Cottage for Sale"	Larry Conley; Willard Robison		3:10
11.	"I Left My Heart in San Francisco"	Douglass Cross; George Cory	With: Tony Bennett	1:09
12.	"San Francisco"	Bronisław Kaper; Gus Kahn; Walter Jurmann		3:38
13.	"Once in a Lifetime"	Anthony Newley; Leslie Bricusse		2:03
14.	"I'm Always Chasing Rainbows"	Harry Carroll; Joseph McCarthy	Arranged by: Kirby Shaw	3:02
15.	"Get Happy/Happy Days Are Here Again"	Harold Arlen; Ted Koehler; Jack Yellen; Milton Ager	With: Barbra Streisand	2:28
16.	"Lost in the Stars"	Kurt Weill; Maxwell Anderson		6:16

Judy – Disc 4
No.	Title	Writer(s)	Featuring	Length
1.	"The Last Dance"	Carl Sigman; Percy Faith		4:18
2.	"Swanee"	George Gershwin; Irving Caesar; Kirby Shaw	Arranged by: Kirby Shaw	2:02
3.	"That Old Feeling"	Lew Brown; Sammy Fain		2:37
4.	"Battle Hymn of the Republic"	Julia Ward Howe; William Steffe		4:13
5.	"I've Got My Love to Keep Me Warm"	Irving Berlin	With: Count Basie and His Orchestra	1:33
6.	"Judy at the Palace Medley: Unless You've Played the Palace; Shine On, Harvest Moon; Some of These Days; My Man; I Don't Care"	Nora Bayes; Jack Norworth; Shelton Brooks; Albert Willemetz; Jacques Charles; Maurice Yvain; Channing Pollock; Jean Lennox; Harry O. Sutton		6:59
7.	"All Alone"	Irving Berlin		1:45
8.	"By Myself"	Howard Dietz; Arthur Schwartz		4:25
9.	"Ol' Man River"	Oscar Hammerstein II; Jerome Kern		3:11
10.	"A Foggy Day (In London Town)"	Ira Gershwin; George Gershwin		2:36
11.	"Medley: Big Bad Bill (Is Sweet William Now); Bill Bailey, Won't You Please Come Home"	Jack Yellen; Milton Ager; Hughie Cannon; Doc Severinsen	With: Peggy Lee	1:08
12.	"Too Late Now"	Alan Jay Lerner; Burton Lane		2:48
13.	"Through the Years"	Edward Heyman; Vincent Youmans		3:25
14.	"If I Only Had a Brain"	E. Y. Harburg; Harold Arlen	With: Ray Bolger	1:29
15.	"We're Off to See the Wizard"	E. Y. Harburg; Harold Arlen	With: Ray Bolger	0:45
16.	"Over the Rainbow"	E. Y. Harburg; Harold Arlen		5:11

Judy – VHS
No.	Title	Writer(s)	Featuring	Length
1.	"Intro"			0:16
2.	"Swanee"	George Gershwin; Irving Caesar; Kirby Shaw	Arranged by: Kirby Shaw	1:50
3.	"Commercial"			1:01
4.	"Medley: It's Almost Like Being in Love; This Can't Be Love"	Alan Jay Lerner; Frederick Loewe; Lorenz Hart; Richard Rodgers		3:12
5.	"What'll I Do?"	Irving Berlin; Kirby Shaw	Arranged by: Kirby Shaw	2:35
6.	"Intro"			0:12
7.	"Battle Hymn of the Republic"	Julia Ward Howe; William Steffe; Sylvia Fine		2:13
8.	"Come Rain or Come Shine"	Johnny Mercer; Harold Arlen		3:30
9.	"Together"	Jule Styne; Stephen Sondheim	With: Liza Minnelli	1:08
10.	"Commercial"			1:01
11.	"When Your Lover Has Gone"	Einar Aaron Swan		3:18
12.	"Intro"			0:58
13.	"Lost in the Stars"	Kurt Weill; Maxwell Anderson		3:47
14.	"As Long as He Needs Me"	Lionel Bart		4:20

== Personnel ==
Credits adapted from Judy CD.

- Produced by Joel Dorn and Adam Dorn for The 3 Ears
- Co-Producer: Scott Schechter
- Design/Illustration: Page Simon
- Mastered by Gene Paul at DB Plus Digital Services, NYC
- Sonic Solutions by Scott Paul and Mark Fellows at DB Plus Digital Services, NYC
- Cover Illustration: Nancy Dwyer, Page Simon, Oliver Wasow
- Cover Illustration based on photographs by Milton H. Greene
- Production Coordinators: Michael Weiner and Becky Wisdom
- Judy Garland Images on pages 2, 6, 8, 18, 27, 37, 56, 81, 95, and 96 © 1998 The Archives of Milton H. Greene, LLC. All rights reserved.
- Editorial Assistance: Suzanne Cleary, John Kruth, Page Simon
