= Easter Parade (song) =

Song

from the album Easter Parade
- Language: English
- Written: Irving Berlin
- Released: 1933

"Easter Parade" is a popular song, written by Irving Berlin and published in 1933. Berlin originally wrote the melody in 1917, under the title "Smile and Show Your Dimple", as a "cheer up" song for a girl whose man has gone off to fight in World War I. A recording of "Smile and Show Your Dimple" by Sam Ash enjoyed modest success in 1918.

Berlin resurrected the tune, with modifications, and gave it the now-familiar Easter lyrics for the 1933 Broadway musical revue As Thousands Cheer, in which musical numbers were strung together on the thematic thread of newspaper headlines; it was first sung by Marilyn Miller and Clifton Webb. Like many of Berlin's songs, it later appeared in films. It was performed by Don Ameche in the 1938 film Alexander's Ragtime Band, which was loosely based on Irving Berlin's life. In 1942, it was featured in the musical film Holiday Inn, in which it was performed by Bing Crosby. In 1948, it was performed by Judy Garland and Fred Astaire in the musical film Easter Parade. The musical was constructed around the song, but with unconventional-for-the-time gender dynamics: Garland's character, after sending Astaire flowers and a new hat, sings the male role with gender-flipped lyrics ("fella" for "lady" and so forth). The song was also featured in the Rankin/Bass special The First Easter Rabbit in 1976.

Artists who had a hit record with the song include Leo Reisman & Clifton Webb (1933), Bing Crosby (recorded June 1, 1942), Harry James (1942), Guy Lombardo and His Royal Canadians (1947), and Liberace (1954).
