= George Cooper (poet) =

American poet

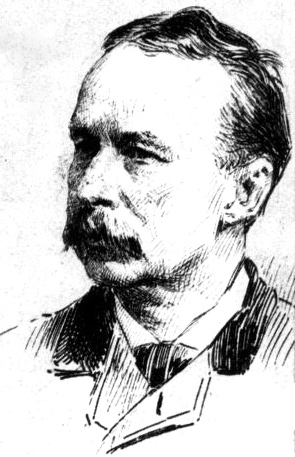

George Cooper (May 14, 1840, New York City – September 26, 1927, New York City) was an American poet remembered chiefly for his song lyrics, many set to music by Stephen Foster, such as "There Are Plenty of Fish in the Sea" and "For the Dear Old Flag I Die!"

Cooper fought as a private in the Twenty-Second New York Infantry during the Civil War and studied for the bar at Chester A. Arthur's office but quit law to focus on writing poetry and music. He was a friend of Tony Pastor and wrote songs for Lillian Russell, as well as serving as an honorary member of the American Society of Authors and Composers. He wrote over 200 songs, among them "Sweet Genevieve", "Beautiful Isle of the Sea", and "Mother, Kiss Me in My Dreams", and poems including "The Wind and the Leaves", "October's Party", and "Only One Mother". "Sweet Genevieve", published in 1869 to music by Henry L. Tucker, became popular in the early 20th century and appeared in films 27 times from 1930 to 1958.

Cooper translated the lyrics of German, Russian, Italian, Spanish, and French musical works into singable English.

He also contributed to many magazines, such as "The Independent", "Atlantic Monthly", "Harper's Magazine", and "Putnam's Monthly".

He died age 89 at his home in the Bronx.

== Works ==
- "For the Dear Old Flag, I Die"
- "Only One Mother"
- "The Wind and the Leaves"
- "An Autumn Greeting"
- "Star of the East" (1890)
- Words for the 1869 song Sweet Genevieve, to music by Henry L. Tucker
- "October’s Party"
