= Words and Music (soundtrack) =

Soundtrack album
- Released: 1948
- Label: MGM

Judy Garland chronology
The Pirate (1948)	Words and Music (1948)	Easter Parade (1949)

The original soundtrack to the 1948 film Words and Music was released by MGM Records earlier in the same year in three formats: as a set of four 10-inch 78-rpm records, as a set of four 7-inch 45-rpm EPs and as a 10-inch long-play. The album contained material taken right out of the soundtrack of the film and has the original vocal done in the picture performed by Mickey Rooney, June Allyson, Lena Horne, Judy Garland, Betty Garrett, and Ann Sothern.

== Critical reception ==
Professional ratings
Review scores
Source	Rating
AllMusic	(1991 reissue)
DownBeat	(Tedious)

DownBeat noted that although the album features "the Rodgers and Hart score" from MGM's Technicolor musical and a "galaxy" of stars, the soundtrack transcriptions "usually fall short of recording studio perfection"; while praising the songs as "top grade", especially "When Hotel" and "Swell", the critic found that the MGM stars were "usually better actors than singers" and that "the whole effect is too much like that which makes you fall asleep in a movie", singling out Lena Horne's performances as "the best sides".

In its review of MGM's series of reissues, Cash Box included Words and Music among the soundtracks paired on the new 12-inch LPs. The publication highlighted the affordable nature of the releases and their inclusion of classic musical films, and noted that the MGM catalog's new packaging could help boost sales.

== Track listing ==
10-inch long-play record (MGM Records E-505)

Side 1
No.	Title	Artist(s)	Length
1.	"Manhattan"	Mickey Rooney
2.	"Johnny One Note"	Judy Garland
3.	"There's a Small Hotel"	Betty Garrett
4.	"The Lady Is a Tramp"	Lena Horne

Side 2
No.	Title	Artist(s)	Length
1.	"Where's That Rainbow"	Ann Sothern
2.	"I Wish I Were in Love Again"	Judy Garland and Mickey Rooney
3.	"Where or When"	Lena Horne
4.	"Thou Swell"	June Allyson
