= Collectors' Gems from the MGM Films =

Compilation album by Judy Garland
- Released: 1996
- Recorded: 1936–1949
- Labels: EMI, TCM Turner Classic Movies Music

Judy Garland chronology
25th Anniversary Retrospective (1995)	Collectors' Gems from the MGM Films (1996)	Judy Garland in Hollywood: Her Greatest Movie Hits (1998)

Collectors' Gems from the MGM Films is a four-CD box set by American singer and actress Judy Garland, released in 1996 by EMI and TCM Turner Classic Movies Music. The collection compiles recordings made during Garland's years at Metro-Goldwyn-Mayer (MGM) between 1936 and 1949, including soundtrack performances, alternate takes, outtakes, and previously unreleased material from films such as Broadway Melody of 1938, Love Finds Andy Hardy, Ziegfeld Girl, Little Nellie Kelly, and The Pirate. It also includes eight prerecordings from Annie Get Your Gun (1950), recorded before Garland's departure from the production.

The collection received generally favorable reviews from critics, who praised Garland's vocal performances, the selection of less familiar material, and the quality of the recordings. Several reviewers highlighted the set's documentation of Garland's artistic development from her early MGM years, while others singled out performances such as "Zing! Went the Strings of My Heart" and "They Say It's Wonderful", as well as the sound quality and accompanying liner notes.

== Album details ==
Collector's Gems from MGM Films draws on Judy Garland's recordings for Metro-Goldwyn-Mayer (MGM) between 1936 and 1949, covering material from films including Broadway Melody of 1938, Love Finds Andy Hardy, Ziegfeld Girl, Little Nellie Kelly, and The Pirate. Rather than focusing on Garland's best-known MGM recordings, such as "Over the Rainbow", "The Trolley Song", and "Get Happy", the compilation concentrates on less familiar material, including alternate takes, outtakes, soundtrack recordings, and previously unreleased performances. The set also includes eight prerecordings from the 1949 production of Annie Get Your Gun, which were recorded before Garland withdrew from the film and was replaced by Betty Hutton.

The collection also features material from Garland's early MGM years, including recordings associated with her screen debut in the short film Everybody Sing (1938), as well as performances such as "Danny Boy", "Zing! Went the Strings of My Heart", and "Your Broadway and My Broadway". Several of the recordings showcase Garland's early swing-oriented vocal style, while others document her work with MGM musical director and arranger Roger Edens, who served as her musical mentor at the studio. Some of the 1940s recordings were produced using MGM's early multi-angle recording process and are presented in stereo, while the collection's annotations provide information about Garland's career, the individual films, and the circumstances surrounding particular songs.

== Critical reception ==
Professional ratings
Review scores
Source	Rating
AllMusic	3/5 stars
The Encyclopedia of Popular Music	3/5 stars

Stereo Review rated the album "Wonderful" for performance and "Amazing" for recording, praising the set for documenting "the development of a legend", and noting that the compilers wisely limited the "often overdone" special-material numbers and the "ill-informed pseudo-jazz opuses" in which Garland merely repeated the word "swing"; the review also observed that the Hollywood soundtrack prerecordings could "far surpass" her commercial recordings of the same material, with songs that sounded "comparatively lifeless" on her Decca releases becoming "amazingly vibrant" here. St. Louis Post-Dispatch praised the collection as "priceless", singling out the Annie Get Your Gun material, particularly Garland's "terrific" duet with Howard Keel on "Anything You Can Do" and her "heart-breaking" rendition of "They Say It's Wonderful"; the newspapper also highlighted her performance of "There's No Business Like Show Business", calling it the "big, big sound" of a star who "would not survive her own talent".

The Village Voice praised Garland's vocal artistry, noting that even at seven she already possessed "the full-toned middle register", "assured phrasing", and "crystalline diction", while by 13 she had perfected a "buttery technical ease"; the newspapper highlighted the "warm insouciance" and "energetic purity" of her early recordings, the "emotional directness" with which she approached songs, and the later recordings' "newly frank emotionality", concluding that despite the unevenness of the post-MGM material, Garland remained "a trouper to the last". AllMusic praised the collection as a "long overdue extension" of Garland's recorded legacy, highlighting the "mesmerizing" effect of her performances and noting that, when combined with her love of swing music, Roger Edens's influence produced results that were "impressive on a universal level"; the review also praised the "astonishingly good" audio quality of most tracks and the thorough annotation. Gramophone praised the compilation as "a scholarly celebration of the youthful phase of a fine talent", emphasizing Garland's "astonishing maturity" as a young performer and her versatility across jazz, swing, ballads, and novelty songs; it also highlighted the "generally excellent sound quality", the "immensely moving" "Zing! Went the Strings of My Heart", and the "heartbreaking" rendition of "They Say It’s Wonderful".

== Track listing ==
=== Collectors' Gems from the MGM Films ===
Disc 1
No.	Title	Original Film	Length
1.	"Waltz With A Swing / Americana"	Every Sunday	2:27
2.	"Opera Vs. Jazz"	Every Sunday	1:36
3.	"Everybody Sing"	Broadway Melody Of 1938	4:48
4.	"Yours And Mine"	Broadway Melody Of 1938	2:22
5.	"Your Broadway And My Broadway"	Broadway Melody Of 1938	3:34
6.	"Got A New Pair Of Shoes"	Thoroughbreds Don't Cry	2:29
7.	"Sun Showers"	Thoroughbreds Don't Cry	2:27
8.	"Down On Melody Farm"	Everybody Sing	4:40
9.	"Why, Because!"	Everybody Sing	2:15
10.	"Ever Since The World Began / Shall I Sing A Melody?"	Everybody Sing	4:27
11.	"In Between"	Love Finds Andy Hardy	4:31
12.	"It Never Rains, But What It Pours"	Love Finds Andy Hardy	2:24
13.	"Bei Mir Bist Du Schoen"	Love Finds Andy Hardy	2:49
14.	"Meet The Beat Of My Heart"	Love Finds Andy Hardy	2:55
15.	"Zing! Went The Strings Of My Heart"	Listen, Darling	2:52
16.	"On The Bumpy Road To Love"	Listen, Darling	2:08
17.	"Ten Pins In The Sky"	Listen, Darling	3:36
18.	"I'm Nobody's Baby"	Andy Hardy Meets Debutante	3:32
19.	"All I Do Is Dream Of You"	Andy Hardy Meets Debutante	1:37
20.	"Alone"	Andy Hardy Meets Debutante	2:43
21.	"It's A Great Day For The Irish"	Little Nelly Kelly	2:37
22.	"Danny Boy"	Little Nelly Kelly	2:37
23.	"A Pretty Girl Milking Her Cow"	Little Nelly Kelly	2:52
24.	"Singin' In The Rain"	Little Nelly Kelly	3:00
25.	"Easy To Love"	Life Begins For Andy Hardy	3:25

Disc 2
No.	Title	Original Film	Length
1.	"We Must Have Music"	Ziegfeld Girl	2:15
2.	"I'm Always Chasing Rainbows"	Ziegfeld Girl	2:08
3.	"Minnie From Trinidad"	Ziegfeld Girl	5:21
4.	"Every Little Movement Has A Meaning Of Its Own"	Presenting Lily Mars	2:10
5.	"Tom, Tom, The Piper's Son"	Presenting Lily Mars	2:40
6.	"When I Look At You"	Presenting Lily Mars	1:32
7.	"Paging Mr. Greenback"	Presenting Lily Mars	4:51
8.	"Where There's Music / St. Louis Blues / It's A Long Way To Tipperary / In The Shade Of The Old Apple Tree / Don't Sit Under The Apple Tree / It's Three O'Clock In The Morning / Broadway Rhythm"	Where There's Music	10:16
9.	"The Joint Is Really Jumpin' Down At Carnegie Hall"	Thousands Cheer	3:40
10.	"D' Ya Love Me"	Till The Clouds Roll By	2:33
11.	"Mack The Black"	The Pirate	6:01
12.	"Love Of My Life"	The Pirate	4:41
13.	"Voodoo"	The Pirate	6:09
14.	"You Can't Get A Man With A Gun"	Annie Get Your Gun	4:23
15.	"There's No Business Like Show Business"	Annie Get Your Gun	2:19
16.	"They Say It's Wonderful"	Annie Get Your Gun	3:22
17.	"The Girl That I Marry"	Annie Get Your Gun	2:07
18.	"I've Got The Sun In The Morning"	Annie Get Your Gun	2:08
19.	"Let's Go West, Again"	Annie Get Your Gun	3:25
20.	"Anything You Can Do"	Annie Get Your Gun	2:38
21.	"There's No Business Like Show Business"	Annie Get Your Gun	1:02

== Personnel ==
Credits adapted from Collectors' Gems From The MGM Films box set.

- Produced by George Feltenstein and Bradley Flanagan
- Project Supervisor Julie D'Angelo
- Art Direction by Coco Shinomiya and Tornado Design
- Design by Darrin Kagele
- Liner Notes by John Fricke
- Additional Liner Notes by George Feltenstein
- Engineered & Mastered by Doug Schwartz, Audio Mechanics, Los Angeles, CA
- Additional Mixing by Allan Finch and Ted Hall
- Photographs Courtesy of Turner Entertainment Co., George Feltenstein, John Fricke, and The USC Cinema and Television Archives
- Production Assistance: Jayne Blume, Tom Eckmier, Norma "Big Red" Edwards, and Julee Stover
