= 25th Anniversary Retrospective =

Compilation album by Judy Garland
- Released: 1995
- Recorded: 1938–1964
- Label: Capitol

Judy Garland chronology
The Complete Decca Masters (plus) (1994)	25th Anniversary Retrospective (1995)	Collectors' Gems from the MGM Films (1996)

25th Anniversary Retrospective is a compilation album by American singer and actress Judy Garland released in 1995 by Capitol Records, in memory of the artist's death in 1969. The album includes 25 tracks from Garland's Capitol albums, as well as several songs from M-G-M Records soundtracks .

== Critical reception ==
Professional ratings
Review scores
Source	Rating
AllMusic	4.5/5 stars

Hi-Fi News & Record Review called the album "categorically, the best single disc Garland collection yet", praising its selection of "twenty-five classics" and its "superb" 48-page booklet. The review also noted the inclusion of "Over the Rainbow", "Easter Parade", and the duet with Liza Minnelli.

== Accolades ==
The album was nominated for Best Album Notes at the 38th Annual Grammy Awards in 1996. The nomination placed Garland alongside renowned artists such as Ella Fitzgerald (Ella: The Legendary Decca Recordings), Carmen McRae (I'll Be Seeing You: A Tribute to Carmen McRae), Louis Armstrong (Let's Do It: Best of the Verve Years) and the winner The Complete Stax/Volt Soul Singles, Vol. 3: 1972–1975 by various artists.

Awards and nominations for 25th Anniversary Retrospective
Year	Award	Category	Result	Ref.
1996	38th Grammy Awards	Album Notes	Nominated	

== Track listing ==
25th Anniversary Retrospective track listing
No.	Title	Writer(s)	Length
1.	"Over the Rainbow"	Yip Harburg; Harold Arlen	2:41
2.	"Be a Clown" (with Gene Kelly)	Cole Porter	2:36
3.	"Easter Parade" (with Fred Astaire)	Irving Berlin	2:40
4.	"I Wish I Were in Love Again" (with Mickey Rooney)	Richard Rodgers; Lorenz Hart	2:26
5.	"Merry Christmas"	Fred Spielman; Janice Torre	2:45
6.	"Get Happy"	Harold Arlen; Ted Koehler	2:48
7.	"Medley: "You Made Me Love You (I Didn't Want to Do It)" / "For Me and My Gal" / "The Boy Next Door" / "The Trolley Song""	James V. Monaco; Joseph McCarthy / E. Ray Goetz; Edgar Leslie; George W. Meyer / Hugh Martin; Ralph Blane	6:17
8.	"Rock-a-Bye Your Baby with a Dixie Melody"	Jean Schwartz; Joe Young; Sam Lewis	2:39
9.	"Just Imagine"	Buddy DeSylva; Lew Brown; Ray Henderson	2:54
10.	"I Feel a Song Comin' On"	George Oppenheimer; Jimmy McHugh; Dorothy Fields	2:08
11.	"How About Me?"	Irving Berlin	3:39
12.	"Do It Again"	Buddy DeSylva; George Gershwin	2:44
13.	"I Am Loved"	Cole Porter	3:16
14.	"Purple People Eater"	Sheb Wooley	3:37
15.	"It Never Was You" (piano accompaniment by Milt Raskin)	Kurt Weill; Maxwell Anderson	3:22
16.	"It's a Great Day for the Irish"	Roger Edens	2:18
17.	"The Man That Got Away"	Harold Arlen; Ira Gershwin	4:07
18.	"San Francisco"	Bronisław Kaper; Gus Kahn; Walter Jurmann	3:39
19.	"Swanee"	George Gershwin; Irving Caesar	2:03
20.	"Never Will I Marry"	Frank Loesser	2:10
21.	"By Myself"	Arthur Schwartz; Howard Dietz	4:28
22.	"Jamboree Jones"	Johnny Mercer	2:30
23.	"Hello, Dolly!" (with Liza Minnelli)	Jerry Herman	3:21
24.	"What Now, My Love?"	Carl Sigman; Gilbert Bécaud	3:50
25.	"Chicago"	Fred Fisher	3:45

== Personnel ==
Credits adapted from 25th Anniversary Retrospective CDt.

- Project director: Wayne Watkins
- Produced and compiled by John Fricke
- Liner notes by John Fricke
- Art Director: Tommy Steele
- Design: DZN
- Photo Research: Brad Benedict, Capitol Photo Archives
- Project coordinated by Kim Niemi
- Digitally remastered by Bob Norberg at the Capitol Recording Studios, Hollywood, CA
