= Till the Clouds Roll By (soundtrack) =

Soundtrack album
- Released: 1947
- Label: MGM

Judy Garland chronology
The Harvey Girls (1945)	Till the Clouds Roll By (1947)	The Pirate (1948)

Till the Clouds Roll By is the soundtrack album to the 1946 eponymous film. It was released in 1947 by MGM Records in the same year as a set of four 10-inch 78-rpm phonograph records. This marked MGM Records' first venture into the soundtrack album market. The album features performances by notable artists such as Kathryn Grayson, Tony Martin, Judy Garland, Virginia O'Brien, Lena Horne, and June Allyson. The soundtrack includes songs composed by Jerome Kern, including "Ol' Man River," "Can't Help Lovin' Dat Man," and "Look for the Silver Lining."

== Background and production ==
The soundtrack was produced by Lennie Hayton, who also conducted the MGM Studio Orchestra and Chorus for the film. The album was released in 1947 by MGM Records, originally as four 78-rpm records featuring various artists and songs from the film and cover artwork by Lennie Hayton. It was MGM Records' first soundtrack album. Due to the limitations of the 78-rpm format, the songs were abridged versions of those heard in the film.

The album was re-released by MGM Records over the years, and Judy Garland's two numbers represented here would be included in most of the compilations of songs from her films. There is an LP version. but no official authorized version has yet been released on CD. (Although several unauthorized versions have appeared on the market.) Rhino Entertainment currently owns the rights to issue an authorized CD of the soundtrack under license from Turner Entertainment; in the past, MCA Records and Sony Music Entertainment held such rights.

== Reception and impact ==
Professional ratings
Review scores
Source	Rating
AllMusic	3.5/5 stars
AllMusic	(reissue)

Upon its release, the soundtrack received positive reviews for its performances and the quality of the recordings. The film itself was noted for its lavish musical numbers, though some critics felt the story was lackluster. The film was one of the early movies to have a soundtrack album released concurrently with it arriving in theaters.

AllMusic published two reviews., William Ruhlmann wrote that the album "was really just a souvenir of the film, and a somewhat altered one at that", noting that with "only eight sides running a total of less than 24 minutes, the album couldn't hope to compete" with the movie's musical scope, although MGM "must be credited with releasing the album at all". Reviewing the reissue edition, Bruce Eder described it as "an all-star tribute to Jerome Kern, without the climactic Frank Sinatra 'Ol' Man River' but filled with worthwhile performances".

== Track listing ==
No.	Title	Artist(s)	Length
1.	"Till the Clouds Roll By"	MGM Studio Chorus
2.	"Make Believe"	Kathryn Grayson, Tony Martin
3.	"Who Cares if My Boat Goes Upstream"	Tony Martin
4.	"Look for the Silver Lining"	Judy Garland
5.	"Life upon the Wicked Stage"	Virginia O'Brien
6.	"Can't Help Lovin' Dat Man"	Lena Horne
7.	"Who?"	Judy Garland, MGM Studio Chorus
8.	"Leave It to Jane" / "Cleopatterer"	June Allyson, MGM Studio Chorus
9.	"Ol' Man River"	Caleb Peterson, MGM Studio Chorus

== Charts ==
Year-end charts

Chart (1947)	Peak position
US Billboard – The Year's Top Selling Popular Albums over Retail Counters	20
