= The Pirate (soundtrack) =

Soundtrack album by Judy Garland and Gene Kelly
- Released: 1948
- Label: MGM

Judy Garland chronology
Till the Clouds Roll By (1947)	The Pirate (1948)	Words and Music (1948)

Professional ratings
Review scores
Source	Rating
Billboard	70/100
AllMusic	(1990 reissue)

The original soundtrack to the 1948 film The Pirate was released by MGM Records earlier in the same year as a set of three 10-inch 78-rpm phonograph records The album contained songs performed by Judy Garland and Gene Kelly.

Billboard reviewed the album in its issue from 10 April 1948, giving it 70 points out of 100 (which indicated a "good" rating) and writing: "On this album's favor: [...] new songs by Cole Porter, name value of Kelly and Garland; capable ork direction and fine reproduction. But ... the ballads have a disappointing absence of retentive melody, and the novelty-rhythm numbers bear faint resemblance to the gifted Porter touch. Film stars handle chores okay but score is not scintillating, and there's the let-down."

== Track listing ==
10-inch long-play record (MGM Records E-21)

Side 1
No.	Title	Artist(s)	Length
1.	"Pirate Ballet" (based on "Mack the Black")
2.	"Be a Clown"	Judy Garland and Gene Kelly
3.	"Love of My Life"	Judy Garland

Side 2
No.	Title	Artist(s)	Length
1.	"You Can Do No Wrong"	Judy Garland
2.	"Nina"	Gene Kelly
3.	"Mack the Black"	Judy Garland

=== Track listing for the extended CD version ===
In 2002, Rhino Handmade/Turner Classic Movies Music released the complete Oscar-nominated score on compact disc, remastered and restored with rare outtakes and rehearsal demos.

1. "Main Title (Mack the Black)"
2. "Niña"
3. "Mack the Black"
4. "Love of My Life" (Outtake)
5. "Pirate Ballet"
6. "You Can Do No Wrong"
7. "Be a Clown"
8. "Love of My Life" (Reprise)
9. "Be a Clown" (Finale)
10. "Mack the Black" (Unused Version)
11. "Papayas / Seraphin's March" (Partial Demo)
12. "Voodoo (Outtake)"
13. "Manuela (Demo)"
14. "Voodoo (Demo)"
15. "Niña (Demo)"
16. "You Can Do No Wrong" (Demo)
17. "Be a Clown" (Demo)
18. Judy Garland Interview with Dick Simmons
19. Gene Kelly Interview with Dick Simmons
