= A Couple of Swells =

Song by Judy Garland and Fred Astaire

- Cover of the sheet music for "A Couple of Swells" from 1947

Song by Judy Garland and Fred Astaire

from the album Easter Parade
- Language: English
- Written: Irving Berlin

"A Couple of Swells" is an American comedy duet song performed by Judy Garland and Fred Astaire in the film Easter Parade (1948). It was written by Irving Berlin. Berlin originally wrote the song "Let's Take an Old-Fashioned Walk" for the scene, but the film's producer, Arthur Freed, persuaded Berlin to change this for a song that would highlight Garland's comedic talent. Berlin wrote the song in about an hour drawing on his experience as a Tin Pan Alley popular songwriter.

== Description ==
The film is set in 1912 in the New York Broadway Vaudeville business in which hobo acts depicting down and outs were popular with audiences. Astaire and Garland appear as tramps in worn out clothing cast off by the very rich. A swell is slang for a wealthy, elegant person. The song and dance explore the fantasy that they really are wealthy and have been invited for tea with the extremely wealthy Vanderbilt family. They have the invitation but no means of getting to the appointment.

The song lyrics suggest ways they might travel up the avenue, (most likely Fifth Avenue, on which the Vanderbilts had 10 mansions), to the club where the Vanderbilts are waiting. These are: to drive a car, skate on ice, ride on a bicycle, sail a yacht, drive a carriage, ride on a trolley car, and swim. Each is rejected with a reason and the only way left to the two tramps is to walk up the avenue.

The song verses close with the refrain:

So we'll walk up the avenue
Yes we'll walk up the avenue
And to walk up the avenue's what we like

Verses in the song also satirize aspects of the lifestyle of the rich; 'sports' who play tennis all summer, Wall Street bankers who are too drunk to find the key to the safe, and wealthy playboys who are adored and chased by photographic models.
