= Summer Stock (soundtrack) =

Soundtrack album
- Released: 1950
- Genre: Show tunes
- Label: MGM

Judy Garland chronology
Judy Garland Third Souvenir Album (1949)	Summer Stock (1950)	A Star Is Born (1954)

Professional ratings
Review scores
Source	Rating
Billboard	86/100
AllMusic	(10-inch LP)
AllMusic	(reissue)

The original soundtrack to the film Summer Stock was released by MGM Records as a set of four 10-inch 78-rpm phonograph records and as a 10-inch 33-rpm long-play. The soundtrack featured songs performed by Judy Garland, Gene Kelly, Phil Silvers and Gloria DeHaven.

Billboard reviewed the album in its issue from 30 September 1950, giving it 86 points out of 100 (which indicated an "excellent" rating) and writing: "The new MGM flick shows early symptoms of a hit; this sound track album figures to do equally as well. Judy Garland and Gene Kelly sell their numbers with their usual show-wise sense of timing and projection. Phil Silvers joins Kelly on a pair of duets, 'Dig' and 'Heavenly', displaying his affable, friendly comic style. Gloria Haven gets a side in 'Mem'ry Island', a ballad. Best of the score's new tunes are the ballads, 'You' and 'Star', in that order."

== Track listing ==
10-inch long-play record (MGM Records E-519)

Side 1
No.	Title	Artist(s)	Length
1.	"(Howdy Neighbor) Happy Harvest"	Judy Garland
2.	"You Wonderful You"	Gene Kelly
3.	"Friendly Star"	Judy Garland
4.	"Heavenly Music"	Gene Kelly and Phil Silvers

Side 2
No.	Title	Artist(s)	Length
1.	"If You Feel like Singing, Sing"	Judy Garland
2.	"Mem'ry Island"	Gloria DeHaven and Pete Roberts
3.	"Get Happy"	Judy Garland
4.	"Dig-Dig-Dig Dig for Your Dinner"	Gene Kelly – Assisted by Phil Silvers
