= A Star Is Born (1954 soundtrack) =

Soundtrack album by Judy Garland
- Released: 1954
- Label: Columbia

Judy Garland chronology
Summer Stock (1950)	A Star Is Born (1954)	Miss Show Business (1955)

The original soundtrack to the 1954 film A Star Is Born was released by Columbia Records in late 1954 in four formats: as a set of five 10-inch 78-rpm shellac records, a set of three EPs, as a 10-inch 33-rpm long-play, and as a 12-inch long-play. The latter was Columbia's first "de luxe" LP priced at 6.95 dollars. The soundtrack conducted by Ray Heindorf featured mainly Arlen–Gershwin songs performed by Judy Garland.

== Critical reception ==
Professional ratings
Review scores
Source	Rating
AllMusic	(10-inch LP)
AllMusic	(reissue)

AllMusic described the soundtrack as "a classic" and noted that "The Man That Got Away" became "a standard and a signature song for Garland". In a later review, they noted that the 1988 reissue "comes closer to what the actual film soundtrack sounded like" and, unlike previous releases, "is in true stereo". Playbill praised Garland's performance, calling her as "totally brilliant" and stating that its songs "truly ought not to be missed". The publication singled out "Lose That Long Face", "It's a New World" and the 15-minute "Born in a Trunk" medley, which it called "endlessly entertaining".

== Commercial performance ==
The album reached the top 10 of Billboard's both "Best Selling Popular Albums" and "EPs" charts.

== Track listing ==
12-inch long-play record (Columbia Records BL-1201)

Side 1
No.	Title	Length
1.	"Gotta Have Me Go with You"
2.	"The Man That Got Away"
3.	"Born in a Trunk" (a) "I'll Get By" (b) "You Took Advantage of Me" (c) "Black Bottom" (d) The Peanut Vendor (e) "My Melancholy Baby" (f) "Swanee"

Side 2
No.	Title	Length
1.	"Here's What I'm Here For"
2.	"It's a New World"
3.	"Someone at Last"
4.	"Lose That Long Face"
