= Judy Garland Second Souvenir Album =

Compilation album by Judy Garland
- Released: 1943
- Label: Decca

Judy Garland chronology
Judy Garland Souvenir Album (1940)	Judy Garland Second Souvenir Album (1943)	Girl Crazy (1944)

Professional ratings
Review scores
Source	Rating
AllMusic	4/5 stars

Judy Garland Second Souvenir Album is the second compilation album by Judy Garland. It was released in 1943, by Decca Records. The album was made to celebrate Garland's first starring role in a film, For Me and My Gal, and the success of the title song which she performs with co-star Gene Kelly. Most of the songs are revivals of old standards.

David Rose, Garland's husband, conducted the orchestra on all tracks except "Zing! Went the Strings of My Heart" and "Fascinating Rhythm" which were recorded on July 29, 1939, during a recording session in Hollywood, California. Victor Young conducted two of the tracks, with modified swing arrangements that enhanced the lively performances.

== Track listing ==
The album was originally issued in 1940 as a set of four 10-inch 78-r.p.m. records (cat. no. A-349).

Side 1
No.	Title	Length
1.	"That Old Black Magic"

Side 2
No.	Title	Length
1.	"Poor Little Rich Girl"

Side 3
No.	Title	Length
1.	"I Never Knew (I Could Love Anybody like I'm Loving You)"

Side 4
No.	Title	Length
1.	"On the Sunny Side of the Street"

Side 5
No.	Title	Length
1.	"For Me and My Gal"

Side 6
No.	Title	Length
1.	"When You Wore a Tulip And I Wore a Big, Red Rose"

Side 7
No.	Title	Length
1.	"Zing! Went the Strings of My Heart"

Side 8
No.	Title	Length
1.	"Fascinating Rhythm"
