= Easter Parade (film) =

1948 film by Charles Walters

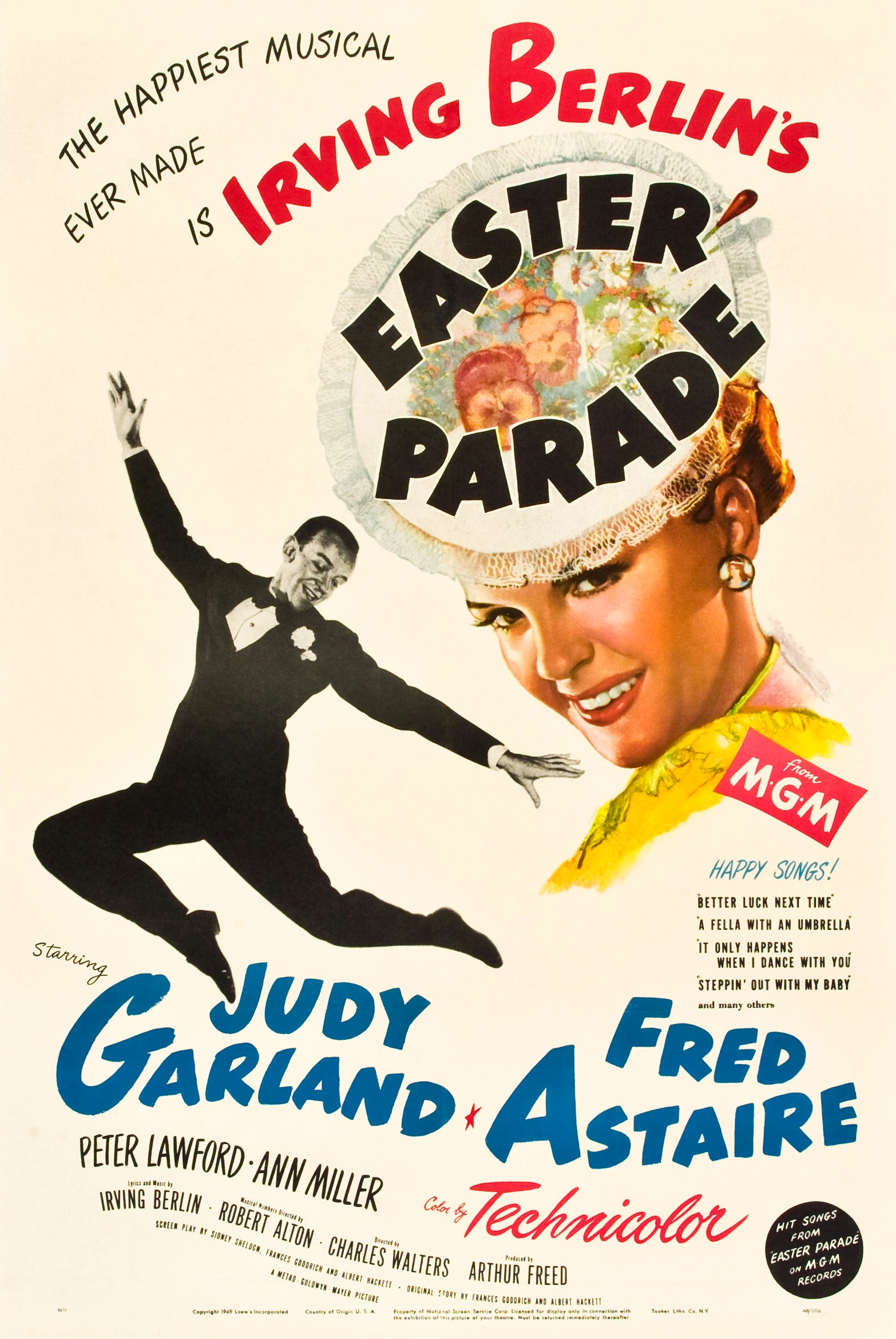
- Theatrical release poster
- Directed by: Charles Walters
- Screenplay by: Sidney Sheldon; Frances Goodrich; Albert Hackett
- Story by: Frances Goodrich; Albert Hackett
- Produced by: Arthur Freed
- Starring: Judy Garland; Fred Astaire; Peter Lawford; Ann Miller
- Cinematography: Harry Stradling
- Edited by: Albert Akst
- Music by: Johnny Green and Roger Edens (score); Irving Berlin (songs)
- Production company: Metro-Goldwyn-Mayer
- Distributed by: Loew's Inc.
- Release date: June 30, 1948
- Running time: 108 minutes
- Country: United States
- Language: English
- Budget: $2.66 million
- Box office: $6.8 million

Easter Parade is a 1948 American Technicolor romantic musical film directed by Charles Walters, written by Sidney Sheldon, Frances Goodrich, and Albert Hackett from a story by Goodrich and Hackett, and starring Judy Garland, Fred Astaire, Peter Lawford, and Ann Miller. The film contains some of Astaire's and Garland's best-known songs, including "Easter Parade", "Steppin' Out with My Baby", and "A Couple of Swells", all by Irving Berlin.

Gene Kelly was originally cast opposite Garland, but broke his ankle. The part was then offered to Astaire, who had retired two years earlier. Very eager to work again, Astaire consulted Kelly about the offer, and Kelly supported his decision to take the role. Garland and Astaire were a successful team, and Astaire was restored to his status as a top MGM star.

A critical and commercial success, Easter Parade was the highest-grossing musical film of 1948, and the second-highest grossing MGM musical of the 1940s, after Meet Me in St. Louis.

== Plot ==
In 1912, Broadway star Don Hewes buys Easter presents for his sweetheart and dancing partner, Nadine Hale ("Happy Easter"), getting a boy to part with a plush rabbit by playing all the drums in the toy store ("Drum Crazy"). He takes the gifts to Nadine, who has been offered the opportunity to star in a show—solo. He tries to persuade her to stay with him ("It Only Happens When I Dance with You"), but she has signed a contract. Don's best friend, Johnny, arrives. Nadine is clearly attracted to Johnny, but he resists her out of respect for Don.

Don drowns his sorrows at the bar at Pastini's restaurant, bragging to Johnny and the bartender, Mike, that he can replace Nadine with any girl from the floor show. He randomly chooses Hannah Brown. The next day at rehearsal, he learns that she suffers from left–right confusion. Determined to turn Hannah into a star, Don buys her a new wardrobe and gives her the exotic stage name "Juanita". She makes several mistakes at their first performance ("Beautiful Faces Need Beautiful Clothes"), and the show is a fiasco.

Johnny unsuccessfully tries to reunite Don with Nadine, who confronts Don about trying to turn Hannah into a copy of her. Later, Johnny meets Hannah by chance and walks her to rehearsal during a rainstorm ("A Fella with an Umbrella"). Realizing he has been taking the wrong approach with Hannah, Don prepares routines better suited to her. Now known as "Hannah & Hewes", they become a great success ("I Love a Piano", "Snookie-Ookums", "The Ragtime Violin", and "When That Midnight Choo-Choo Leaves for Alabam'").

Auditioning for the Ziegfeld Follies, Don and Hannah meet the show's star—Nadine. Realizing that Nadine is Don's former partner, Hannah demands to know whether he loved her. At Hannah's hotel room, Don reveals that he turned down the Ziegfeld offer, believing that Hannah is too good to be in the same show as Nadine. They are about to kiss when Johnny arrives to take Hannah to dinner. He confesses that he fell in love with her during the rainstorm, but Hannah admits that she is hopelessly in love with Don.

After watching Nadine's show ("Shakin' the Blues Away"), Don tells Hannah that he has signed them to star in their own show and invites her out on the town to celebrate. She arrives at his apartment to find that he has arranged a private dinner. When Don begins to discuss their act, Hannah accuses him of treating their rendezvous like a dance rehearsal. She tries to leave, but he kisses her. She plays the piano and sings "It Only Happens When I Dance with You". "Why didn't you tell me I was in love with you?" he asks, and they embrace.

Their show features Don and a large chorus ("Steppin' Out with My Baby") before he and Hannah play tramps ("A Couple of Swells"). Afterward, Don takes Hannah to celebrate at the roof garden, where Nadine is performing in the Ziegfeld Follies. After dancing to "The Girl on the Magazine Cover", Nadine insists that Don perform one of their old numbers with her: "It Only Happens When I Dance with You (Reprise)". Don reluctantly agrees, and Hannah leaves.

At Pastini's, where she and Don first met, Hannah pours out her troubles to Mike ("Better Luck Next Time"). She finds Don waiting outside her hotel room, accusing him of using her to make Nadine jealous. Don promises to wait all night for her to forgive him, but the house detective ejects him. The next morning, Johnny visits Hannah and claims that Don is already auditioning a new partner, compelling her to admit that she loves Don. Johnny remarks that if he loved someone, he would find a way to show them.

Flowers, a chocolate egg, and a live bunny inside a top hat are anonymously delivered to Don's apartment. Shortly afterward, Hannah arrives and reminds him of their date ("Easter Parade"). Don puts a diamond ring on her left hand as they walk in the Easter parade along Fifth Avenue.

== Cast ==
- Judy Garland as Hannah Brown
- Fred Astaire as Don Hewes. Gene Kelly was originally cast as Don, but he broke his ankle just before production. Astaire had announced his retirement from film two years before, but was coaxed back by Kelly to replace him. Astaire "retired" several more times over the next decade, but made a number of classic musicals in between retirements.
- Peter Lawford as Jonathan Harrow III. Eventual fellow Rat Pack member Frank Sinatra was at one point considered for this role.
- Ann Miller as Nadine Hale. This film marked her major MGM debut. She had previously been under contract to RKO in the 1930s and then to Columbia Pictures in the early to mid-1940s, replacing Cyd Charisse, who withdrew from the production due to torn ligaments in her knee.
- Jules Munshin as François, the maître d'hôtel
- Clinton Sundberg as Mike, the bartender
- Richard Beavers as the singer of "The Girl on the Magazine Cover"
- Jeni Le Gon as Essie, Nadine's maid (uncredited)
- Jimmy Bates as the boy in the toy shop (uncredited)
- Norman Barker as the trombonist in the duet with Garland (uncredited)
- Jimmie Dodd, who went on to lead The Mickey Mouse Club, as the cab driver after Hannah leaves the Ziegfeld audition (uncredited)

== Musical numbers ==
All songs by Irving Berlin. Performance credits below indicate both singing and dancing unless otherwise noted.

1. "Happy Easter" (Fred Astaire)
2. "Drum Crazy" (Astaire)
3. "It Only Happens When I Dance with You" (Astaire singing, dancing with Ann Miller)
4. "I Want to Go Back to Michigan" (Judy Garland)
5. "Beautiful Faces Need Beautiful Clothes" (Astaire and Garland dancing)
6. "A Fella with an Umbrella" (Peter Lawford, Garland)
7. Vaudeville Montage: "I Love a Piano" (Garland singing, dancing with Astaire), "Snookey Ookums" (Astaire, Garland), "The Ragtime Violin" (Astaire singing, dancing with Garland), and "When the Midnight Choo-Choo Leaves for Alabam'" (Garland, Astaire)
8. "Shakin' the Blues Away" (Miller)
9. "It Only Happens When I Dance with You (reprise)" (Garland singing)
10. "Steppin' Out with My Baby" (Astaire, chorus, and featured dancers Patricia Jackson, Bobbie Priest, Dee Turnell)
11. "A Couple of Swells" (Astaire, Garland)
12. "The Girl on the Magazine Cover" (Richard Beavers singing, Miller dancing)
13. "It Only Happens When I Dance with You (instrumental)" (Astaire and Miller dancing)
14. "Better Luck Next Time" (Garland singing)
15. "Easter Parade" (Garland, Astaire)
16. "Everybody's Doin' It Now" (Instrumental)

One musical number, a seductive performance of "Mr. Monotony" by Garland wearing a tuxedo jacket, black fedora, and black nylons (a style of dress that became something of a trademark of hers in later years after she wore the same outfit in Summer Stock), was cut from the film as too risqué for a film set in 1912. Audiences finally got to see it when an edited version was included in the 1994 compilation film That's Entertainment! III. It was first seen as part of the extras on the VHS and Laser Disc special edition versions the next year. When the film was released to DVD, several minutes of outtakes, raw footage, and alternative takes of this performance were included in addition to the footage previously released.

As with White Christmas six years later, it is impossible to remix the musical numbers from this film into stereo or surround sound, because the original audio track recordings burned in a fire, leaving only a monaural composite track containing dialogue, music and effects, and an isolated music-only track intended for international release.

== Release ==
=== Original theatrical run ===
Easter Parade premiered in New York City on July 8, 1948. It was a commercial success, earning over $6.8 million at the box office. Critics praised the performances, particularly Garland's and Astaire's, as well as the choreography and Berlin's songs. The film won the Academy Award for Best Original Music Score and remains a hallmark of MGM's musical productions during Hollywood's Golden Age.

=== Television ===
Easter Parade first aired on American television in the mid-1950s, as part of MGM's strategy to capitalize on its extensive film library through television broadcasts. Its family-friendly appeal and iconic musical numbers, such as "A Couple of Swells" and "Easter Parade," made it a perennial favorite during holiday programming. The film has been regularly aired on networks like Turner Classic Movies particularly during the Easter season, ensuring its continued popularity among audiences.

Turner Classic Movies traditionally airs this movie during Easter Sunday and was always the first movie to air during the primetime hours.

=== Home media ===
Easter Parade was initially released on CED Videodisc in 1981. It was released on VHS in 1986 and reissued on VHS in 1989 and 1992–1993 by MGM/UA Home Video, followed by multiple DVD releases, including a special edition in 2005 that featured behind-the-scenes documentaries and interviews. In 2013, Warner Bros. released Easter Parade on Blu-ray, presenting a remastered version with improved video and audio quality. The Blu-ray release included additional features, such as audio commentary by film historians and surviving members of the production team. The film is also available for on streaming platforms such as Amazon Prime Video and Apple TV.

== Reception ==
Easter Parade earned $4,144,000 in the United States and Canada and $1,659,000 overseas.

The film received mostly positive reviews. On the review aggregator website Rotten Tomatoes, the film holds an approval rating of 91% based on 22 reviews.

=== Accolades ===
Award	Category	Recipient	Result
Academy Awards	Best Original Score	Johnny Green and Roger Edens	Won
Writers Guild of America Awards	Best Written American Musical	Sidney Sheldon, Frances Goodrich and Albert Hackett	Won

== See also ==
- List of Easter films
