= List of Judy Garland biographies =

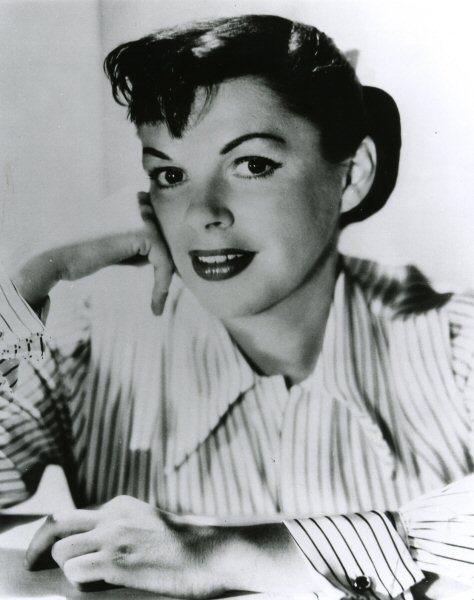
Judy Garland in 1954

Judy Garland has been the subject of many biographies. Since her death in 1969, she has been the subject of over two dozen books. The first of these was The films and Career of Judy Garland by Morella and Epstein, published by Citadel Press. It was the only book published before her death. The second was Brad Steiger's Judy Garland, published shortly after her death, which includes information on Garland's astrological chart, analysis of her handwriting, numerology and biorhythms. Most of the books are entirely about Garland, but some, including Patricia Fox-Sheinwold's Too Young to Die, Some Are Born Great by Adela Rogers St. Johns and Jane Ellen Wayne's The Golden Girls of MGM, merely feature a chapter about her. Two volumes, Rainbow's End: The Judy Garland Show by Coyne Steven Sanders and Mel Tormé's The Other Side of the Rainbow: On the Dawn Patrol With Judy Garland, focus on Garland's television series, The Judy Garland Show. Garland's last husband, Mickey Deans, co-authored an early biography in 1972 and Garland's daughter Lorna Luft wrote a family memoir in 1988.

Garland has been profiled on-screen several times. The earliest known film biography was a 1961 installment of the syndicated television series Hollywood Hist-o-rama, which covered her career through the filming of A Star is Born. Garland was the subject of episodes of the British series Omnibus, 60 Minutes, Biography and the E! True Hollywood Story. Her life story was fictionalized in Rainbow in 1978 and in 2001 in Life with Judy Garland: Me and My Shadows, based on daughter Luft's memoir.

On stage, Garland is a character in The Boy from Oz, a 1998 musical based on the life of former son-in-law Peter Allen, and the 2006 play The Property Known as Garland, based on tape recordings made prior to her last concert appearance.

== Print ==
Author	Title	Publication date	Publisher	ISBN	Notes
John Briggs	Judy Garland: Little Woman, Big Talent	2014	Atombank Books	978-0-9905160-2-6	The first children's book about Judy Garland
Scott Brogan	Judy Garland: The Voice of MGM	2025	Lyons Press (Globe Pequot)	978-1-4930-8654-2	Brogan is longtime webmaster of thejudyroom.com and judygarlandnews.com
Gerald Clarke	Get Happy: The Life of Judy Garland	2000	Random House	978-0-375-50378-8	Harvey Weinstein optioned Get Happy with plans to produce a stage show and film based on it, starring Anne Hathaway. No such production has materialized.
Emily R. Coleman	The Complete Judy Garland: The Ultimate Guide To Her Career in Films, Records, Concerts, Radio, and Television, 1935-1969	1990	Harper & Row	978-0-06-016333-4	
David Dahl and Barry Kehoe	Young Judy	1975	Mason/Charter	978-0-246-10917-0	
Mickey Deans and Ann Pinchot	Weep No More, My Lady	1972	G. K. Hall	978-0-515-02989-5	Co-authored by Garland's last husband.
Al DiOrio, Jr.	Little Girl Lost: The Life and Hard Times of Judy Garland	1973	Arlington House	978-0-340-20747-5	
Paul Donnelley	Judy Garland	2007	Haus	978-1-904950-81-3	
Anne Edwards	Judy Garland	1975	Simon and Schuster	978-0-671-21845-4	
Christopher Finch	Rainbow: The Stormy Life of Judy Garland	1975	Ballantine	978-0-345-25173-2	
Patricia Fox-Sheinwold	Too Young to Die	1979; 1982	Bell Publishing Company	978-0-517-39137-2	Includes a chapter on Garland
Gerold Frank	Judy	1975	Harper & Row	978-0-06-011337-7	
John Fricke	Judy Garland: World's Greatest Entertainer	1992	Henry Holt & Co.	978-1-56731-204-1	
John Fricke	Judy Garland: A Portrait in Art & Anecdote	2003	Bullfinch	978-0-8212-2836-4	Includes a foreword by Lorna Luft
James Juneau	Judy Garland: A Pyramid Illustrated History of the Movies	1974	Pyramid Communications	978-0-515-03482-0	
Lorna Luft	Me and My Shadows: A Family Memoir	1988	Simon & Schuster	978-0-283-06320-6	Written by Garland's daughter. Served as the basis of an Emmy award-winning television film.
David Melton	Judy: A Remembrance	1972	Stanyan Books	978-0-7091-5257-6	
John Meyer	Heartbreaker: A Memoir of Judy Garland	1983; 2006	Doubleday; Citadel Press	978-0-8065-2754-3 (Citadel)	Story of the two months John Meyer spent with Judy Garland
Joe Morella and Edward Z. Epstein	Judy: The Complete Films and Career of Judy Garland	1969	Citadel Press	978-0-8065-1017-0	
Rita E. Piro	Judy Garland, The Golden Years	2001	Great Feats Press	978-0-9706261-7-2	The only biography to include a detailed family tree and history provided by Garland's maternal family.
Rita E. Piro	Judy Garland: In Celebration	2003	Great Feats Press	978-0-9706261-3-4	
James Adam Richliano	Angels We Have Heard: The Christmas Song Stories	2002	Star Of Bethlehem Books	978-0-9718810-0-6	Includes a chapter on Garland's involvement in the making of the song Have Yourself A Merry Little Christmas
Coyne Steven Sanders	Rainbow's End: The Judy Garland Show	1990	William Morrow & Co.	978-0-8217-3708-8	Focuses on Garland's television series, The Judy Garland Show
Scott Schechter	Judy Garland: The Day-by-Day Chronicle of a Legend	2002	Cooper Square Press / Rowman-Littlefield	978-0-8154-1205-2	
David Shipman	Judy Garland: The Secret Life of an American Legend	1993	Little Brown and Company	978-0-7868-8026-3	
Lorna Smith	Judy, With Love: The Story of Miss Show Business	1975	Robert Hale and Co.	978-0-7091-5257-6	
James Spada, with Karen Swenson	Judy and Liza	1983	Doubleday & Company, Inc.	978-0-385-18202-7	
Adela Rogers St. Johns	Some Are Born Great	1974	Doubleday & Company, Inc.	978-0-385-08769-8	Includes a chapter on Garland
Michelle Russell	From Tennessee to Oz - The Amazing Saga of Judy Garland's Family History, Part 1 & 2	2009 & 2011	Catsong Publishing	978-0-9800642-2-3	The story of Judy Garland's paternal ancestry in Tennessee, beginning in 1793.
Brad Steiger	Judy Garland	1969	Ace Books	OCLC 2577482 The first biography published after Garland's death	
Mel Tormé	The Other Side of the Rainbow: On the Dawn Patrol With Judy Garland	1971	W. H. Allen	978-0-88365-181-0	"Tell-all" book written about Tormé's time as musical director of The Judy Garland Show
Ethlie Ann Vare, ed.	Rainbow: A Star-Studded Tribute to Judy Garland	1998	Boulevard Books	978-1-57297-334-3	Collection of previously published material about Garland. Foreword by Michael Musto.
Thomas J. Watson and Bill Chapman	Judy: Portrait of an American Legend	1986	McGraw-Hill Book Company	978-0-07-068487-4	
Jane Ellen Wayne	The Golden Girls of MGM	2003	Carroll and Graf	978-0-7867-1303-5	Includes a chapter on Garland

== Film and video ==
Year	Title	Series	Network	Notes
1961	Judy Garland	Hollywood; Hist-o-rama	Syndicated	Syndicated television short covering Garland's career through A Star is Born, glossing over any mention of Garland's problems.
1972	Judy: Impressions of Garland	Omnibus	BBC	
1975	Judy/The Ultra Secret	60 Minutes	CBS	The Garland segment was one of two in the episode. "The Ultra Secret" was a segment about World War II code-breaking.
1978	Judy Garland	The Hollywood Greats	BBC	
1978	Rainbow	—N/a	NBC	Biopic focusing on Garland's early years. Andrea McArdle played Garland.
1985	Judy Garland: The Concert Years	Great Performances	PBS	Nominated for an Emmy award for "Outstanding Informational Special".
1997	Judy Garland: Beyond the Rainbow	Biography	A&E	Expanded two-hour episode.
2001	Life with Judy Garland: Me and My Shadows	—N/a	ABC	Two-part biopic based on the Luft memoir. Garland as a child was played by Tammy Blanchard and Judy Davis played Garland as an adult. The mini-series was nominated for 13 Emmys, and won five, including awards to both Blanchard and Davis.
2001	Last Days of Judy Garland	E! True Hollywood Story	E!	
2004	Judy Garland: By Myself	American Masters	PBS	Won two Emmy awards for Outstanding Picture Editing for Nonfiction Programming and Outstanding Writing for Nonfiction Programming; nominated for three more.
2019	Judy	—N/a	—N/a	Theatrical film directed by Rupert Goold starring Renée Zellweger as Garland, who earned the Academy Award for Best Actress.

== Stage ==
Year	Title	Author	Starring	Notes
1998	The Boy from Oz	Nick Enright (book); Peter Allen (music and lyrics)	Chrissy Amphlett (1998 Australian production); Isabel Keating (2003 Broadway production)	Musical based on the life of Peter Allen in which Garland is a character. Amphlett reprised her role for the 2006 Australian arena tour.
2005	End of the Rainbow	Peter Quilter	Caroline O'Connor (original Australian run); Tracie Bennett (2010 London and 2012 Broadway productions)	Covers the period leading up to Garland's 1968 concert tour of England.
2006	The Property Known as Garland	Billy Van Zandt	Adrienne Barbeau	Based on tape recordings made by Garland on the night of her final concert appearance, in Copenhagen in 1969.
2010	The Judy Monologues	Darren Stewart-Jones	Various	Based on tape recordings made by Garland in the mid-1960s for her never-written autobiography.

== See also ==
- List of Judy Garland awards and honors
- List of Judy Garland performances
- Judy Garland discography
