= Louis B. Mayer =

Canadian-American film producer (1884–1957)

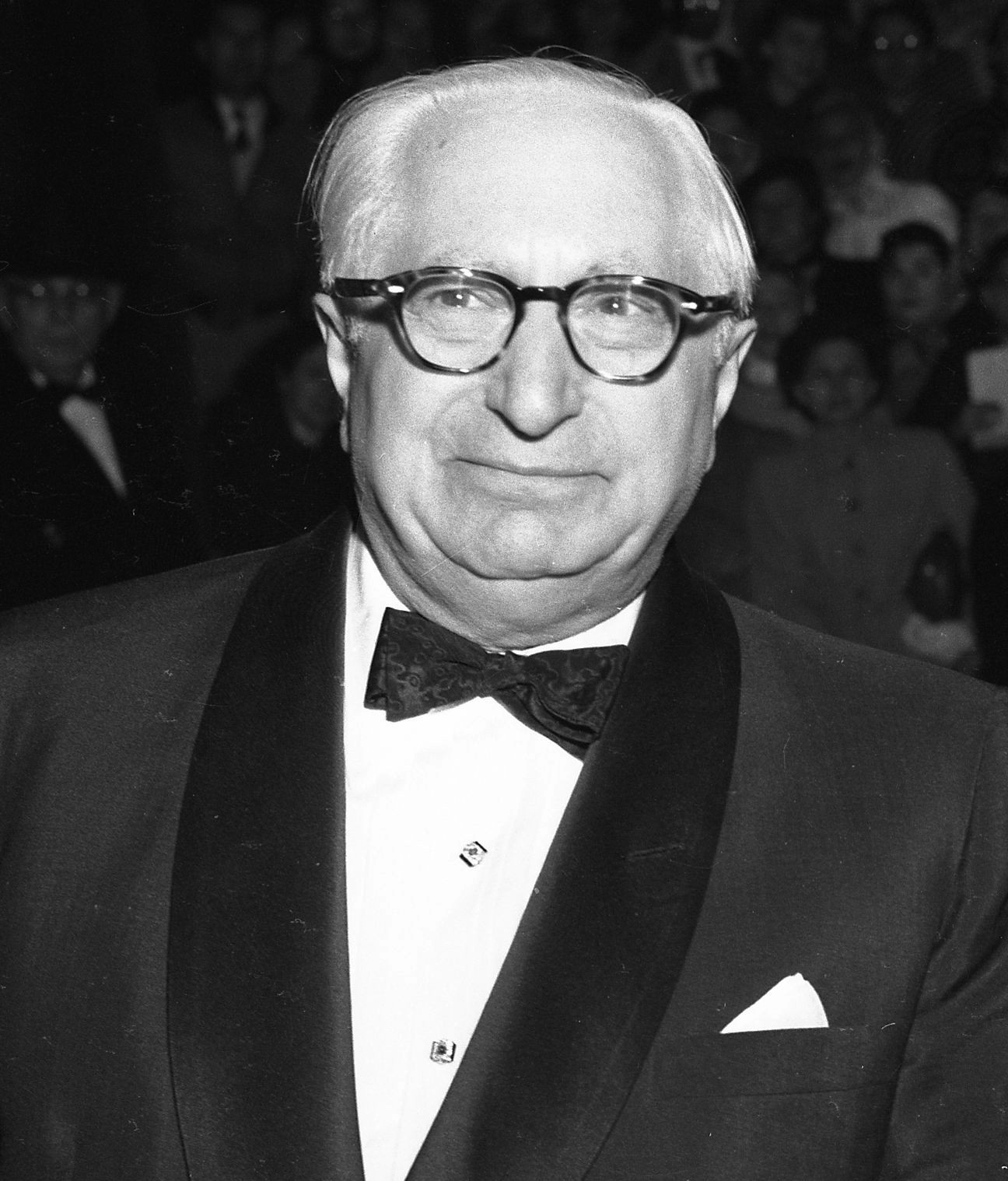
- Mayer in 1953

Chair of the California Republican Party
- In office 1932–1933
- Preceded by: Marshal Hale
- Succeeded by: Earl Warren

Personal details
- Born: Lazar Meir; July 12, 1884 Minsk or Dymer, Russian Empire
- Died: October 29, 1957 (aged 73) Los Angeles, California, U.S.
- Resting place: Home of Peace Cemetery, Los Angeles County
- Party: Republican
- Spouses: Margaret Shenberg (m. 1904; div. 1947); Lorena Layson (m. 1948)
- Children: 2, including Irene Mayer Selznick
- Occupation: Film producer; Studio executive
- Nicknames: Louis Burt Mayer; Ezemiel Mayer; Louis Burton Mayer; Lazar Mayer; Lazar Meir

Louis Burt Mayer (/ˈmeɪ.ər/; born Lazar Meir; July 12, 1884 – October 29, 1957) was a Canadian-American film producer and co-founder of Metro-Goldwyn-Mayer studios (MGM) in 1924. Under Mayer's management, MGM became the film industry's most prestigious movie studio, accumulating the largest concentration of leading writers, directors, and stars in Hollywood.

Mayer was born in either Minsk or Dymer, then both part of the Russian Empire and grew up poor in Saint John, New Brunswick, Canada. He quit school at 12 to support his family and later moved to Boston and purchased and renovated a small vaudeville theatre in Haverhill, Massachusetts. He renovated and expanded several other theatres in the Boston area catering to audiences of higher social classes. After expanding and moving to Los Angeles, he teamed with film producer Irving Thalberg and they developed hundreds of films. Mayer handled the business of running the studio, such as setting budgets and approving new productions, while Thalberg, still in his twenties, supervised all MGM productions.

Mayer claimed to believe in "wholesome entertainment" and went to great lengths to discover new actors and develop them into major stars. During his long reign at MGM, Mayer acquired many critics and supporters. Some stars did not appreciate his attempts to control their private lives, while others saw him as a concerned father figure. He was controversial for his treatment of the actors under his management, such as in the case of Judy Garland, whom he forced to go on diets, take drugs, and work punishing schedules.

Mayer was forced to resign as MGM's vice president in 1951, when the studio's parent company, Loew's, Inc., wanted to improve declining profits. A staunch conservative, Mayer at one time was the chairman of the California Republican Party. In 1927, he was one of the founders of AMPAS, famous for its annual Academy Awards.

== Early life ==
Mayer preferred to say that he was born in Minsk. Bosley Crowther, in an early biography, gave his birthplace as "a little town near Minsk". Other sources cite such places as Demre and Dmra, "a village between Minsk and Vilnius". Charles Higham and Scott Eyman state that Mayer was born in Dymer near Kiev; this accords with what Mayer himself stated in his naturalization filing in 1912, where he gave his birthplace as Dumier, Russia.

According to his personal details in the U.S. immigration documents, the date was July 4, 1885. (Note: Mayer maintained that he was born in Minsk on July 4, 1885. July 12, 1884 was the date of birth that was given in the 1901 Canadian Census. According to Scott Eyman, the reasons may have been: Mayer's father gave different dates for his birthplace at different times, so Mayer was not comfortable specifying a date; It was part of Mayer's sense of showmanship and being born on July 4 seemed to stand for patriotism and had a certain ring to it; "He needed to believe in a myth of self-creation which, in his case, was not far off the mark"; When Mayer was young, his family constantly moved around in the general area of Minsk, Vilnius and Kyiv; As Jews, they felt insecure and therefore were reluctant to be specific.) In addition he gave his birth year as 1882 in his marriage certificate while the April 1910 census states his age as 26 (b.1883). His parents were Jacob and Sarah (née Meltzer) Meir (both Jewish) and he had two sisters — Yetta, born ca. 1878 and Ida, born ca. 1883. Mayer first moved with his family to Long Island, where they lived from 1887 to 1892 and where his two brothers were born—Rubin, in April 1888 and Jeremiah, in April 1891. Then, they moved to Saint John, New Brunswick, where Mayer attended school.

His father started a scrap metal business, J. Mayer & Son. An immigrant unskilled in any trade, he struggled to earn a living. Young Louis quit school at age twelve to work with his father and help support his family. He roamed the streets with a cart that said "Junk Dealer" and collected any scrap metal he came across. When the owner of a tin business, John Wilson, saw him with his cart, he began giving him copper trimmings which were of no use and Mayer considered Wilson to be his first partner and his best friend. Wilson remembered that he was impressed with the boy's good manners and bright personality. Whenever Mayer visited Saint John in later years, he placed flowers on Wilson's grave, just as he did on his mother's.

I had been to his hometown. I knew from whence he sprang. He taught himself grammar. He taught himself manners. If anybody on earth ever created himself, Louis B. Mayer did.

— actress Ann Rutherford

"It was a crappy childhood", said Mayer's nephew Gerald. His family was poor and Mayer's father spoke little English and had no valuable skills. It thus became young Mayer's ambition and drive that supported the family. With his family speaking mostly Yiddish at home, his goal of self-education when he quit school was made more difficult.

In his spare time, he hung around the York Theatre, sometimes paying to watch the live vaudeville shows. He became enamored of the entertainment business. Then in 1904 the 20-year-old Mayer left Saint John for Boston, where he continued for a time in the scrap metal business, got married and took a variety of odd jobs to support his new family when his junk business lagged.

== Early career ==
Mayer renovated the Gem Theater, a rundown, 600 seat burlesque house in Haverhill, Massachusetts, which he reopened on November 28, 1907, as the Orpheum, his first movie theater. To overcome an unfavorable reputation that the building had, Mayer opened with a religious film at his new Orpheum, From the Manger to the Cross, in 1912. Within a few years, he owned all five of Haverhill's theaters, and, with Nathan H. Gordon, created the Gordon-Mayer partnership that controlled the largest theater chain in New England. During his years in Haverhill, Mayer lived at 16 Middlesex St. in the city's Bradford section, closer to city center at Temple Street and at 2 1/2 Merrimac St. Mayer also lived in a house he built at 27 Hamilton Ave.

In 1914, the partners organized their own film distribution agency in Boston. Mayer paid D.W. Griffith $25,000 for the exclusive rights to show The Birth of a Nation (1915) in New England. Mayer made the bid on a film that one of his scouts had seen, but he had not, although he was well aware of the plot surrounding the Ku Klux Klan; his decision netted him over $100,000. Using earnings from the popularity of The Birth of a Nation, Mayer partnered with Richard A. Rowland in 1916 to create Metro Pictures Corporation, a talent booking agency, in New York City.

Two years later, Mayer moved to Los Angeles and formed his own production company, Louis B. Mayer Pictures Corporation. The first production was 1918's Virtuous Wives. A partnership was set up with B. P. Schulberg to make the Mayer-Schulberg Studio

In late 1922, Mayer was introduced to Irving Thalberg, then working for Universal Pictures. Mayer was searching for someone to help him manage his small, but dynamic and fast-growing studio. At that first meeting, Thalberg made an immediate positive impression on Mayer, writes biographer Roland Flamini. Later that evening, after Thalberg had left, Mayer told the studio's attorney, Edwin Loeb, to let Thalberg know that if he wanted to work for Mayer, he would be treated like a son.

Although their personalities were in many ways opposite, Mayer being more outspoken and nearly twice the younger man's age, Thalberg was hired as vice president in charge of production at Louis B. Mayer Productions. Years later, Mayer's daughter, Irene Mayer Selznick, found it hard to believe that anyone "so boyish could be so important". According to Flamini, Thalberg was hired because, although Mayer was an astute businessman, he lacked Thalberg's strong ability to combine making films of quality with gaining commercial success.

== Heading new Metro-Goldwyn-Mayer (MGM) studios ==
Mayer's big breakthrough was in April 1924 when his company subsequently merged with two others to become Metro-Goldwyn-Mayer (MGM). The 24-year-old Thalberg was made part-owner and accorded the same position as vice president in charge of production.

Marcus Loew, owner of the Loew's chain, merged Metro Pictures, Samuel Goldwyn's Goldwyn Pictures Corporation, and Mayer Pictures into Metro-Goldwyn. Loew had bought Metro and Goldwyn some months before, but could not find anyone to oversee his new holdings on the West Coast. Mayer, with his proven success as a producer, was an obvious choice. He was named head of studio operations and a Loew's vice president, based in Los Angeles, reporting to Loew's longtime right-hand man Nicholas Schenck. He would hold this post for the next 27 years. Before the year was out, Mayer added his name to the studio with Loew's blessing, renaming it Metro-Goldwyn-Mayer. Three years after the merger, MGM became the most successful studio in Hollywood.

Loew died in 1927, and Schenck became president of Loew's. Mayer and Schenck hated each other intensely; Mayer reportedly referred to his boss, whose name was pronounced "Skenk", as "Mr. Skunk" in private. Two years later, Schenck agreed to sell Loew's – and MGM – to William Fox, which angered Mayer. But despite his important role in MGM, Mayer was not a shareholder, and had no standing to challenge the sale. So he instead used his Washington connections to persuade the Justice Department to delay the merger on antitrust grounds. During the summer of 1929, Fox was severely injured in an auto accident. By the time he recovered, the stock market crash had wiped out his fortune, destroying any chance of the deal going through even if the Justice Department had lifted its objections. Nonetheless, Schenck believed Mayer had cost him a fortune and never forgave him, causing an already frigid relationship to become even worse.

=== Working with Irving Thalberg ===
Mayer and Thalberg were a brilliant team that worked well together. They relied on each other, and neither operated unilaterally. Mayer took charge of the business part of running the studio, such as setting budgets and approving new productions. Thalberg, eventually called the "boy wonder", took charge of all MGM productions. Director Joseph M. Newman said that their skills complemented each other well, with Thalberg having a great story mind, and Mayer having superior business acumen.

Mayer and Thalberg shared a guiding philosophy, to make the best motion pictures they could at any cost, even if it meant reshooting the entire picture. For them it was more important than showing a consistent profit with their films. They strove to see MGM become a high-quality studio. That goal began with their early silent films.

Although they initially got along well, their relationship frayed over philosophical differences. Thalberg preferred literary works over the crowd-pleasers Mayer wanted. He ousted Thalberg as production chief in 1932, while Thalberg was recovering from a heart attack, and replaced him with producer David O. Selznick.

But MGM received a serious blow when Thalberg died on September 14, 1936, at age 37. His death came as a shock to Mayer and everyone at MGM and the other studios. Mayer issued statements to the press, calling Thalberg "the finest friend a man could ever have ... the guiding inspiration behind the artistic progress on the screen." His funeral was a major news event in Los Angeles. All the studios observed five minutes of silence, while MGM closed its studio for the entire day.

Mayer dedicated MGM's front office building and christened it the Thalberg Building. He had the Academy of Motion Picture Arts and Sciences establish the Irving G. Thalberg Memorial Award, given to producers to recognize their exceptional careers, now considered one of the most prestigious awards in the Hollywood film industry.

=== Continued success after Thalberg's death ===
After Thalberg died, many in Hollywood expected Mayer to "stumble and fall". Director Joseph M. Newman saw the studio start to change for the worse. Some actors were affected, such as Luise Rainer, winner of Hollywood's first back-to-back Oscars, who felt that the death of Thalberg marked the death of her career: "Had it not been that he died, I think I may have stayed much longer in films." Joan Crawford was also concerned, feeling that with Thalberg gone, the concept of the quality "big" picture "pretty much went out the window".

However, MGM under Mayer's leadership continued to produce successful movies. Mayer made himself head of production as well as studio chief. For the next ten years, MGM grew and thrived. 1939 was an especially "golden" year: besides distributing Gone with the Wind, MGM released The Wizard of Oz, Babes in Arms, At the Circus, and The Women. Garbo laughed in Ninotchka; Goodbye, Mr. Chips won an Oscar (it was nominated for seven); and Hedy Lamarr, another of Mayer's personal discoveries, made her film debut.

Mayer became the first person in American history to earn a million-dollar salary. For nine years from 1937, when he earned $1,300,000 (equivalent to $29,114,583 today) Mayer was the highest-paid man in the United States.

== Managing MGM ==
=== Management style ===
In his overall management skills, Mayer was considered a great executive, someone who could have run General Motors equally as well as a large studio like MGM, said producer Joseph L. Mankiewicz. He worked at the studio all the time, and decisively, without any fixed schedule, but disliked paperwork. Some said Mayer had a lot in common with newspaper magnate William Randolph Hearst. Hearst had financed multiple MGM pictures, while MGM benefited by having film reviews included nationwide in the Hearst newspapers.

Hearst, 20 years Mayer's senior, affectionately referred to Mayer as "son" and they became good friends. Mayer took Hearst's suggestion to build himself an office bungalow on the MGM lot, something Hearst said was appropriate for a studio head: "Everybody of distinction from all over the world comes to Los Angeles and everybody who comes wants to see your studio and they all want to meet you and do meet you, so put on a few airs son, and provide the atmosphere." Director Clarence Brown pointed out that overall, Mayer's skill was similar to Hearst's in that they both learned by doing. What Mayer couldn't do on his own, he hired the best talent he could find to do for him. "Like Hearst and Henry Ford," said Brown, "he was an executive genius".

Mayer's temper was widely known, but most people knew that his sudden bursts of anger faded quickly. With those working underneath him, he was usually patient and preferred to leave department heads alone, and would fire executives if they failed to produce successful films over a long period.

=== Growth of the studio ===
At its peak in the 1940s, MGM employed six thousand people, had three entrances, and covered 185 acres in Culver City, California, outside of Los Angeles. It had forty cameras and sixty sound machines, used on its six separate lots, and connected with its own rail line. About 2,700 people ate in the commissary every day. Power was supplied by an in-house electrical plant which could light a town of 25,000. In addition, MGM maintained a police force of fifty officers—larger than that of Culver City itself. "Anywhere from sixteen to eighteen pictures were being shot at one time", remembers actress Ann Rutherford. "They were either shooting or preparing to shoot on every sound stage."

=== Creating a "star system" ===
Mayer helped create what is termed the "star system". At one point he explained the process he went through in creating a star:

The idea of a star being born is bush-wah. A star is made, created; carefully and cold-bloodedly built up from nothing, from nobody. All I ever looked for was a face. If someone looked good to me, I'd have him tested. If a person looked good on film, if he photographed well, we could do the rest. ... We hired geniuses at make-up, hair dressing, surgeons to slice away a bulge here and there, rubbers to rub away the blubber, clothes designers, lighting experts, coaches for everything—fencing, dancing, walking, talking, sitting and spitting.

=== Hiring actors and staff ===
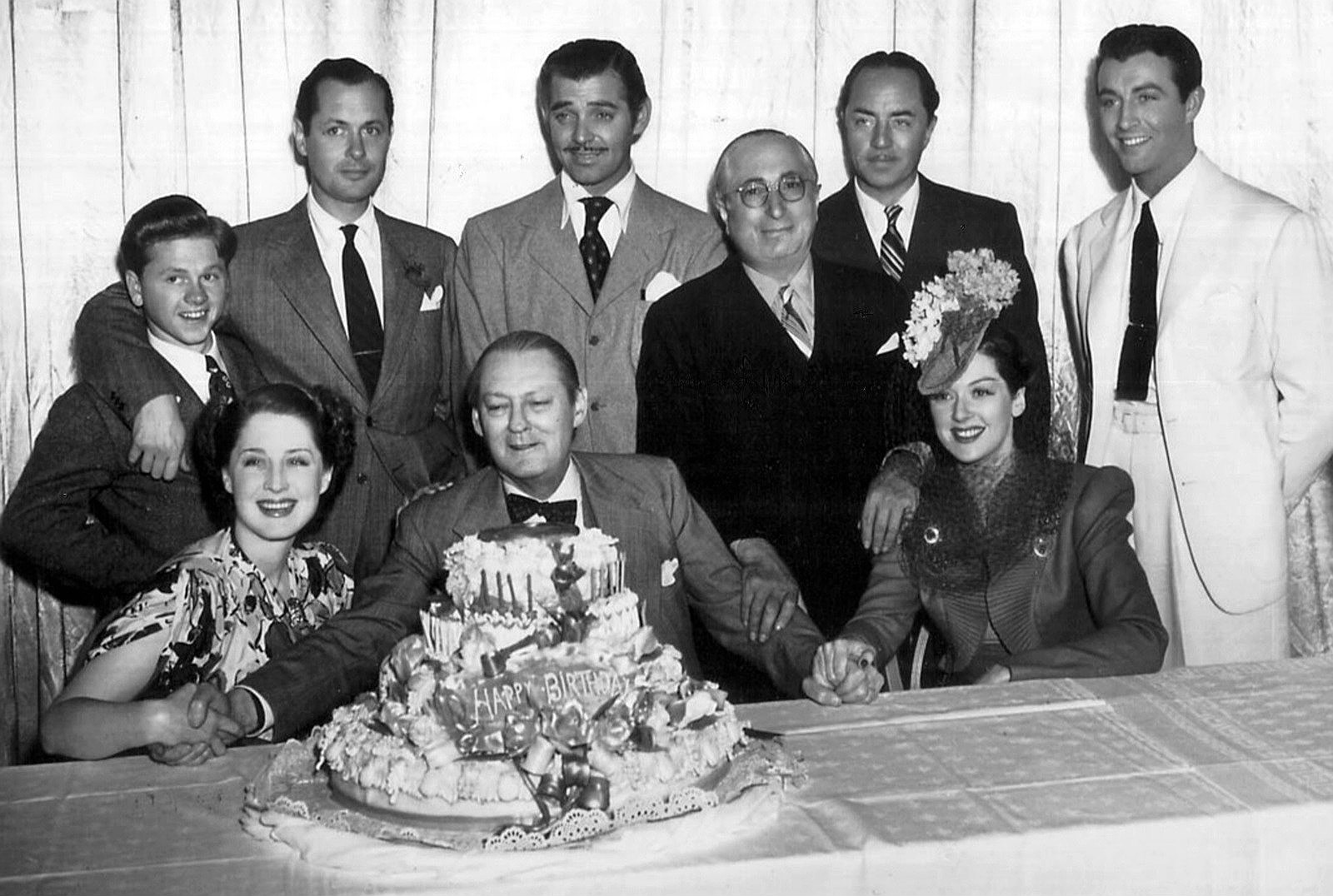
Lionel Barrymore's 61st birthday in 1939, standing: Mickey Rooney, Robert Montgomery, Clark Gable, Louis B. Mayer, William Powell, Robert Taylor, seated: Norma Shearer, Lionel Barrymore, and Rosalind Russell

During MGM's growth period, Mayer traveled often, and among his personal discoveries were Greta Garbo [note: other Wikipedia entries suggest Greta Garbo was 'discovered' by Thalberg, as well as a second third party, and her own history suggests that she was first connected to California via yet another producer while filming in Germany; please help to improve what is presently an unserious section/entry (see, e.g., the previous section, which includes audacious claims unburdened by evidence)], Hedy Lamarr, Norma Shearer and Greer Garson. He also signed up dancing team Marge and Gower Champion and discovered Mario Lanza, then a young tenor from Philadelphia, who Mayer hoped to turn into a "singing Clark Gable".

When hiring new actors, he typically wanted them to agree to stay with the studio for either three or seven years, during which time they would become one of the MGM "family". The studio usually succeeded in hiring those it wanted since they offered the highest salaries. With executives, Mayer took more time before taking them, wanting to know them first on a personal level. He respected intelligence and talent overall, said manager Joe Cohn: "One time he said to me, 'Never be afraid of hiring a fellow smarter than you are. You'll only learn from them.'"

Mayer took pride in his ability to hire good people, and once hired, he left them alone to do their job without interference. That policy held true whether the person was a producer, a department head or simply a janitor. As a result, while other studios went through continuous upheavals or reorganizations, Mayer's hands-off policy kept MGM stable and sound, where employees felt their jobs were secure."

When meeting a new employee, he always told them to come to him personally for help with any problems. Some, like Barbara Stanwyck, considered this attitude to be "pompous," however, since he used his position to meddle in people's lives. Others, such as actor Edward G. Robinson, after his first meeting with Mayer, said "I found him to be a man of truth ... Behind his gutta-percha face and roly-poly figure, it was evident there was a man of steel—but well-mannered steel." British director Victor Saville remembered him as being "the best listener. He wanted to know. He was the devil's advocate. He would prod you and question you and suck you dry of any knowledge."

=== Working with studio people ===
L.B. wasn't crude at all. Super-intelligent people might have found him common or crass. He may have been an immigrant with a good suit of clothes, but never forget that this was a man working hard to be an American.

— actress Esther Williams

His attitude and conversational style were both professional and animated, sometimes "theatrical", observed June Caldwell, secretary to Eddie Mannix, Mayer's assistant. "Bombastic and colorful, but I never heard him use nasty language ... he had a great loyalty to everybody, and everybody respected him. And he would listen ... You could work with him." His manners were considered "impeccable".

With MGM's film output as high as one film each week, he never panicked over a bad picture. If somebody suggested canceling a movie and cutting the studio's losses, when a film had consistent production problems, Mayer would typically refuse. He relied on his instinct and intuition, said actress Esther Williams. Although he did not read full scripts, if he was given the framework of a story, he could assemble the pieces needed to see if it could be a successful film.

Occasionally, when producers, directors, writers or actors were deadlocked over how to handle a problem in a film, he would mediate. On Rosalie, for instance, when Nelson Eddy refused to sing a song he thought was too melodramatic, its songwriter, Cole Porter, went to Mayer and played it for him. Mayer was moved to tears by the song, and told Eddy to sing it. "Imagine making Louis B. Mayer cry," Porter later told friends.

=== Response to technical innovations ===
With regard to any technical issues with productions, Mayer left the details and solutions to MGM's engineers. He, though, like other top film executives and Hollywood stars in the 1920s and early 1930s, was often too quick to dismiss news of inventions and major innovations on the horizon that might profoundly change the movie industry or possibly challenge in the future the growing dominance of films in the realm of American entertainment. Beyond the well-entrenched aspect of sound by 1932, other technologies being discussed at that time in newspapers and on studio lots included color features, widescreen formatting, and even early television. In August 1932, after an "exclusive" interview with Mayer in New York, The Film Daily reported the movie mogul's assertions that such potential developments would never impact motion pictures in substantial, meaningful ways:

Peering into the industry's future, Louis B. Mayer ... sees no great production development or invention which will again revolutionize the business, as in the instance of sound. Television, color, and wide film he dismissed as promising no important influence on motion pictures. Television, according to the M-G-M chieftain, is impractical from the standpoint of any association with motion pictures. In taking this attitude he stressed the rapidity at which images must be transmitted in television and pointed out that satisfactory results cannot be obtained with this requirement. Except in some short subjects, such as educationals, travelogues, and novelties, color has no place on the screen, Mayer asserted. It has the effect of detracting interest from the story being told. In addition the cost must be considered. Examining the possibility of the wide screen, Mayer said that it eliminates the intimacy allowed by the standard-sized screen. It might be effectively used in mob scenes, he observed, but pointed out the impracticability of switching back and forth between projectors capable of projecting both sizes of pictures.

=== Being a father figure ===
With many of his actors, Mayer was like an overprotective father. In some cases, especially with child actors, he could become closely involved in managing their everyday lives, telling them where to shop, where to dine, or what doctor to visit. He liked giving suggestions about how they could take better care of themselves. He sometimes arranged marriages, and coping with occupational hazards such as alcoholism, suicide, and eccentric sexual habits were as much a part of his job as negotiating contracts with stars and directors. When he learned that June Allyson was dating David Rose, for instance, he told her to stop seeing him: "If you care about your reputation, you cannot be seen with a married man."

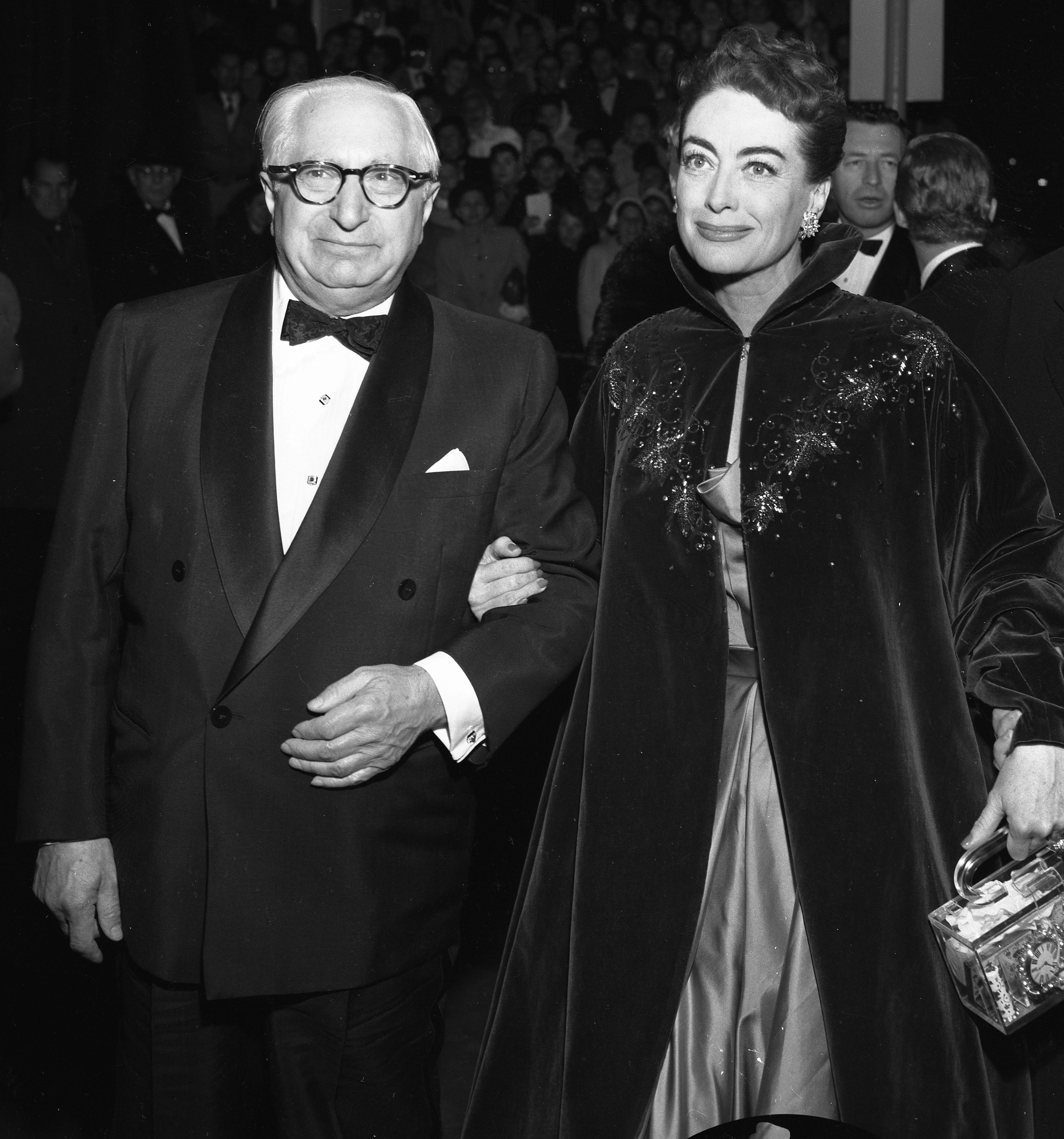
Mayer with Joan Crawford at the premiere of Torch Song, 1953. "To me," she once stated, "L.B. Mayer was my father, my father confessor, the best friend I ever had."

Stories about his sobbing or rages have often been repeated in books, but few employees ever saw that part of him. "Mr. Mayer was to me like a father", said Ricardo Montalbán. "He really thought of the people under contract as his boys and girls." Mayer's paternalism could extend to productions; for example, he revised the Dr. Kildare stories in order to keep an ailing Lionel Barrymore, who required the use of a wheelchair due to arthritis, on the job.

Some, such as young starlet Elizabeth Taylor, disliked Mayer overseeing their lives; Taylor called him a "monster", while Mickey Rooney, another young actor who co-starred with Taylor when she was 12, formed the opposite impression: "He was the daddy of everybody and vitally interested in everybody. They always talk badly about Mayer, but he was really a wonderful guy ... he listened and you listened." Rooney spoke from experience, as he himself had some confrontations with Mayer, observed film historian Jane Ellen Wayne:

Mayer naturally tried to keep all his child actors in line, like any father figure. After one such episode, Mickey Rooney replied, "I won't do it. You're asking the impossible." Mayer then grabbed young Rooney by his lapels and said, "Listen to me! I don't care what you do in private. Just don't do it in public. In public, behave. Your fans expect it. You're Andy Hardy! You're the United States! You're the Stars and Stripes. Behave yourself! You're a symbol!" Mickey nodded. "I'll be good, Mr. Mayer. I promise you that." Mayer let go of his lapels. "All right", he said.

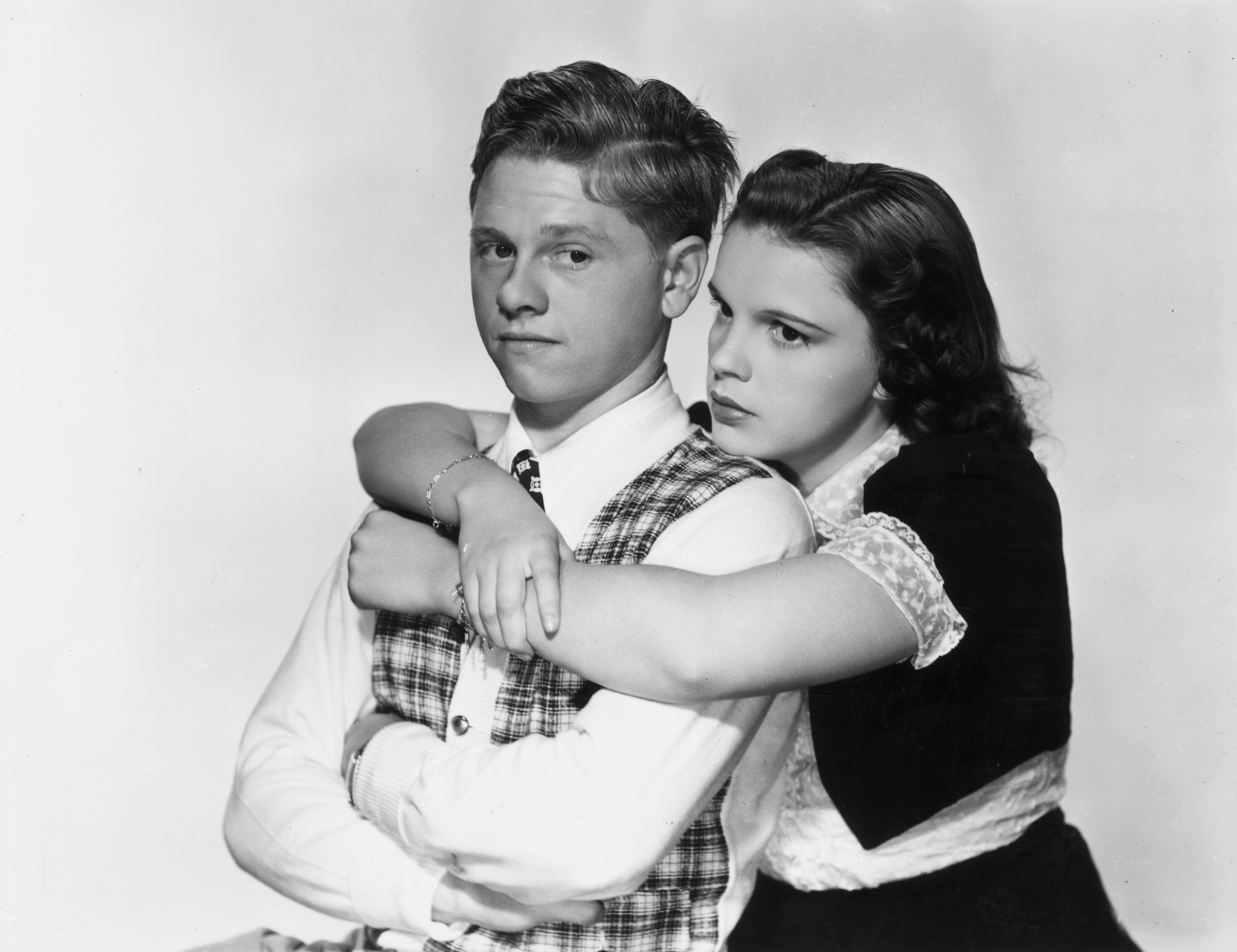
Mickey Rooney and Judy Garland in Love Finds Andy Hardy, 1938

One of Rooney's repeat costars in Andy Hardy and other films was Judy Garland, with whom he made nine films. Garland stated in her unfinished autobiography that Mayer molested her. In the late 1940s, she began having personal problems, which affected her acting, and Mayer tried his best to protect her star reputation while keeping her overworked and making money for MGM. She suffered from addictions to prescription drugs, severe eating disorders and domestic strains, as well as a multitude of issues with her mental health. This was largely the result of Metro-Goldwyn-Mayer, her mother, and the era's ignorance of diet and drugs. When her absences caused the production of Summer Stock to go far over budget, producer Joe Pasternak suggested that Mayer cut his losses and cancel the picture. Mayer refused, telling him, "Judy Garland has made this studio a fortune in the good days, and the least we can do is to give her one more chance. If you stop production now, it'll finish her", in what some consider to be his last attempt at holding on to her fame for the benefit of the studio. She completed the film, but during her next picture, Annie Get Your Gun, the studio finally ran out of patience. Costar Howard Keel recalls that "she began to fall apart". After the studio fired her, she attempted suicide.

=== Developing child stars ===
Mayer wanted the studio to nurture child stars for MGM's family-oriented productions. The studio provided all the essential services, such as formal education and medical care. They were given acting or dancing tutors. Mayer loved children, wrote biographer Kitty Kelley: "They provided the magic that brought millions of people stampeding into theaters every week ... They were the good, clean, wholesome elements of the folksy entertainment that was MGM's specialty."

Jackie Coogan, then 11, marked the studio's debut using child stars with his role in The Rag Man in 1925. During Hollywood's golden age, MGM had more child actors than any other studio, including Jackie Cooper, Mickey Rooney, Judy Garland, Freddie Bartholomew, Margaret O'Brien, Elizabeth Taylor, and Roddy McDowall.

== Themes, musicals and formula ==
While MGM's films during the 1920s and 1930s were often known for containing adult themes and strong female stars, such as Greta Garbo, after Thalberg's early death in 1936, Mayer promoted a change in emphasis to more male leads, family themes, and child stars. And unusual for a movie mogul, he took moral positions in his movies, especially when it came to portraying family values—as in the Andy Hardy series. One of Mayer's proudest moments came when Mickey Rooney, who starred as Andy Hardy, was given a special award by the Academy in 1942 for "furthering the American way of life."

I am going to make pictures you can take your mother and your children to see. I am not going to make pictures for the sake of awards or for the critics. I want to make pictures for Americans and for all people to enjoy. When I send my pictures abroad, I want them to show America in the right light—and not that we are a nation chiefly of drunks, gangsters and prostitutes.

— Louis B. Mayer

Mayer tried to express an idealized vision of men, women, and families in the real world they lived in. He also believed in beauty, glamour, and the "star system". In MGM films, "marriage was sacrosanct and mothers were objects of veneration". Author Peter Hay states that Mayer "cherished the Puritan values of family and hard work." When he hired writers, he made those objectives clear at the outset, once telling screenwriter Frances Marion that he never wanted his own daughters or his wife to be embarrassed when watching an MGM movie. "I worship good women, honorable men, and saintly mothers", he told her. Mayer was serious about that, once coming from behind his desk and knocking director Erich von Stroheim to the floor when he said that all women were whores.

Mayer knew that formula in his themes and stories usually works. He felt that the general public, especially Americans, like to see stars, spectacle, and optimism on screen, and if possible, with a little sentiment attached. They don't like to be challenged or instructed, but comforted and entertained.

Therefore, having messages was less important to Mayer than giving his audience pure entertainment and escapism. In his screen dramas, he wanted them to be melodramatic, whereas in comedies, he often laced them with strong doses of sentimentality. "He loved swaggering, charismatic hams like Lionel Barrymore and Marie Dressler", wrote Eyman.

Musicals were high on his list of preferred genres. Anxious to make more of them, on a hunch, he asked songwriter Arthur Freed to be associate producer for The Wizard of Oz. As Mayer hoped, Freed's unit at MGM produced many films considered among the best musicals ever made: For Me and My Gal, Girl Crazy, Meet Me in St. Louis, The Harvey Girls, The Pirate, Easter Parade, The Barkleys of Broadway, On the Town, An American in Paris, Singin' in the Rain, The Band Wagon, and Gigi. Mayer's greatest contributions to posterity are said to be his musicals. Both An American in Paris and Gigi won the Academy Award for Best Picture.

== World War II issues ==
Unlike Charlie Chaplin, who produced The Great Dictator, the other, much larger Hollywood studios lacked the freedom to make anti-Nazi films. Mayer understood that the Germans could ban or boycott Hollywood films throughout much of Europe, with serious economic implications, since 30 to 40 percent of Hollywood's income came from European audiences. Nevertheless, MGM produced Three Comrades in 1938, despite movie censor Joseph Breen warning Mayer that the film was "a serious indictment of the German nation and people and is certain to be violently resented by the present government in that country."

After the Second World War began in Europe in September 1939, Mayer authorized the production of two anti-Nazi films, The Mortal Storm and Escape. At the same time, Warner Brothers produced Confessions of a Nazi Spy. The German government informed the studios that "those films would be remembered by Germany when — not if — they won the war", writes Eyman. Warners had to post guards to protect the family of actor Edward G. Robinson, and the Germans threatened Mayer with a boycott of all MGM films.

From September 1939 until January 1940, all films that could be considered anti-Nazi were banned by the Hays Office. The U.S. ambassador to England, Joseph Kennedy, told the studios to stop making pro-British and anti-German films. Kennedy felt that "British defeat was imminent and there was no point in America holding out alone: 'With England licked, the party's over,' said Kennedy."

Defying those pleadings, MGM produced Mrs. Miniver, a simple story about a family in rural England trying to get by during the early years of the war. Eddie Mannix agreed that "someone should salute England. And even if we lose $100,000, that'll be okay."

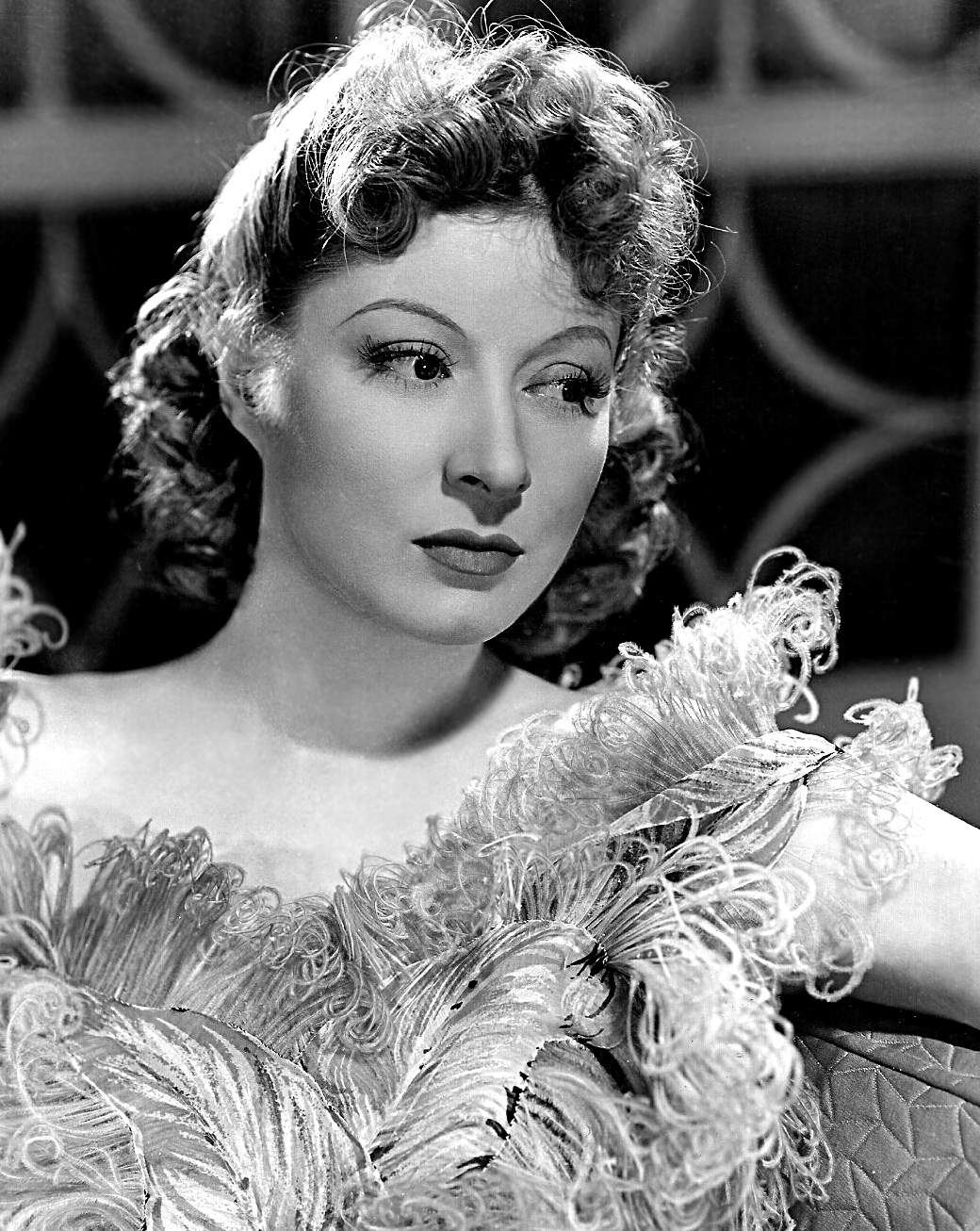
Greer Garson, 1940s

Mayer wanted British actress Greer Garson, his personal discovery, to star, but she refused to play a matronly role. Mayer implored her "to have the same faith in me" that he had in her. He read from the script, having her visualize the image she would present to the world, "a woman who survives and endures. She was London. No, more than that, she was ... England!" Garson accepted the role, winning the Academy Award for Best Actress. Mrs. Miniver won six Academy Awards and became the top box office hit of 1942.

President Franklin D. Roosevelt and British Prime Minister Winston Churchill both loved the film, said historian Emily Yellin, and Roosevelt wanted prints rushed to theaters nationwide. The Voice of America radio network broadcast the minister's speech from the film, magazines reprinted it, and it was copied onto leaflets and dropped over German-occupied countries. Churchill sent Mayer a telegram claiming that "Mrs. Miniver is propaganda worth 100 battleships." Bosley Crowther (1960 biographer of Mayer, below), wrote in his New York Times review that Mrs. Miniver was the finest film yet made about the war, "and a most exalting tribute to the British."

The following year, 1943, saw the release of another Oscar-winning film, this one aimed at supporting the home front, titled The Human Comedy. It was Mayer's personal favorite and the favorite of its director, Clarence Brown. Mayer assisted the U.S. government by producing a number of short films related to the war, and helped produce pro-American films such as Joe Smith, American, in 1942.

== Declining years at MGM ==
The post-war years saw a gradual decline in profits for MGM and the other studios. The number of high-grossing films in 1947 dwindled to six, compared to twenty-two a year earlier. MGM had to let go many of its top producers and other executives. Mayer was pressured to tighten expenses by the studio's parent company, although Mayer's reputation as a "big-picture man" would make that difficult. They began looking for someone, another Thalberg, to redo the studio system.

In the interim, Mayer kept making "big pictures". When RKO turned down financing of Frank Capra's State of the Union in 1948 because of its expensive budget, Mayer took on the project. He filled the cast with MGM stars including Katharine Hepburn, Spencer Tracy, Van Johnson, Adolphe Menjou and Angela Lansbury, but the film only broke even. Nicholas Schenck called Mayer and insisted that he "cut, cut", recalls director George Sidney. Mayer replied, "A studio isn't salami, Nick." "L.B. would ask only one question: 'Can you make it better?' It was all he cared about", said Sidney.

As pressure built to find a new Thalberg-style manager to handle production, Dore Schary was brought in from RKO, and began work on July 14, 1948, as vice president in charge of production, working under Mayer's direction.

Some long-time studio executives saw this change as a sign of the eventual downfall of MGM. When she heard the news, Lillian Burns Sidney, George Sidney's wife, marched into Mayer's office and announced, "Now you've done it. You've ruined everything." She told Mayer that she was afraid Schary would eliminate all future musicals, comedies and adventure movies, and replace them with the "message" movies that he preferred. She expressed her fear: "They won't have need for anybody around here. Even you! You'll see."

By mutual consent with Loew's, Mayer resigned from MGM in August 1951. On his final day, as he walked down a red carpet laid out in front of the Thalberg Building, executives, actors and staff lined the path and applauded him for his contributions. "He was so respected," said June Caldwell, Eddie Mannix's secretary. Many assumed that his leaving meant the end of an era. Actor Turhan Bey said, "In every meaningful way, it was the end of Hollywood."

== Post MGM ==
Mayer, for a period after he left MGM, tried to finance and assemble a new group of film stars and directors to produce his own films as an independent. He told the press that his films would carry on in the tradition of MGM's previous style of film subjects. In 1952, he became chairman of the board and the single largest shareholder in Cinerama, and had hoped to produce a property he owned, Paint Your Wagon, in the widescreen process, but without success. He left Cinerama in 1954 when the company was sold.

Mayer was part of an unsuccessful attempt to take over MGM before his death.

== Personal life ==
=== Accusations of sexual abuse ===
Louis B. Mayer has been accused of sexual abuse, including having groped a then-teenage Judy Garland. According to Gerald Clarke's book Get Happy: The Life of Judy Garland, Mayer "held meetings with the young woman seated on his lap, his hands on her chest". In an interview with Larry King and in her autobiography, Shirley Temple claimed that Mayer "came on to" her mother while at the same time, Temple was in the adjacent office of Arthur Freed, who, she claimed, disrobed before her; she proceeded to laugh until he threw her out. At the time Temple was 12 years old.

Mayer reportedly pursued Jean Howard in hopes of establishing a sexual relationship, but without success. Cari Beauchamp, author of Without Lying Down: Frances Marion and the Powerful Women of Early Hollywood, observed: "Mayer chased actress Jean Howard around the room. When she said, 'No way', and went off and married Charles K. Feldman, the agent, Mayer banned Charlie from the lot. For a long time after, he wouldn't allow any of Feldman's clients to work at MGM." In her autobiography, Esther Ralston recorded that her career was sabotaged by Mayer when she refused to sleep with him.

=== Family ===
Louis B. Mayer and his second wife Mrs. Lorena Danker shortly after their marriage.

Mayer had two daughters from his first marriage to Margaret Shenberg (1883–1955), which ended in divorce in 1947. The elder of these, Edith (Edie) Mayer (1905–1988), whom he would later become estranged from and disinherit, married producer William Goetz (who served as vice president for Twentieth-Century Fox and later became president of Universal-International). The younger, Irene (1907–1990), was the first wife of producer David O. Selznick and became a successful theatrical producer. In 1948, Mayer married former actress Lorena Layson Danker (1907–1985).

At home, Mayer was boss. "In our family, all the basic decisions were made by him", remembers his nephew, Gerald Mayer. "He was a giant. ... Were we afraid of him? Jesus Christ, yes!" And although he never spoke Yiddish at the office, he sometimes spoke Yiddish with "some of the relatives", said his daughter Irene.

Mayer's activities for the Jewish Home for the Aged led to a strong friendship with Rabbi Edgar Magnin, the rabbi at the Wilshire Temple in Los Angeles. "Edgar and Louis B. virtually built that temple", said Herbert Brin.

=== Entertainment and leisure ===
At his home on Saint Cloud Road in the East Gate Bel Air neighborhood, Sundays were reserved for brunches in what was an open house, which often included visiting statesmen or former U.S. presidents, along with various producers, directors or stars. There would be a buffet supper, drinks, and later a movie. Mayer drank almost no alcohol, cared nothing for fine cuisine, and did not gamble, but might play penny-ante card games for fun.

For leisure activities, he liked going to the Hollywood Bowl, especially the annual John Philip Sousa concert. Sousa's patriotic-style music built up his pride in America, and he "would be stoked with extra exuberance for days afterward", states Eyman. Mayer also enjoyed ballet and opera, and concerts where violinist Jascha Heifetz or pianist Arthur Rubinstein performed.

While Mayer seldom discussed his early life, his partiality towards Canada would sometimes be revealed, especially after Canada entered World War II in September 1939 and the United States followed more than two years later in December 1941. On one occasion in 1943, Mary Pickford called to tell him she met a movie-struck Royal Canadian Air Force pilot from New Brunswick, where Mayer grew up. Mayer asked her to have him drop by the studio. The pilot, Charles Foster, recalled his visit: "Mary's driver took me through the gates, and I saw this little man come running down the steps of the Thalberg Building. I thought, 'Oh, he's sent a man to greet me.' And I got out of the car, and this man threw his arms around me and said, 'Welcome to my studio.' "

Mayer took him on a personal tour of the studio, and Foster remembered that "everybody waved to him and he waved back. He spoke to people and knew them by name. I was shocked." Mayer invited him back for lunch the next day. But before Foster arrived, Mayer had invited every Canadian in Hollywood to meet the flier, including Rod Cameron, Jack Carson, Deanna Durbin, Walter Huston, Raymond Massey, Walter Pidgeon, Ann Rutherford, Fay Wray, and even his main competitor, Jack Warner. Mayer told him, "When this war is over, if you want to come back here, I'll find a job for you." Foster said "It was like he was the father I never knew."

=== Politics ===
Active in Republican Party politics, Mayer served as the vice chairman of the California Republican Party in 1931 and 1932, and as its state chairman in 1932 and 1933. As a delegate to the 1928 Republican National Convention in Kansas City, Mayer supported Secretary of Commerce Herbert Hoover of California. Mayer became friends with California Governor James Rolph Jr., Oakland Tribune publisher Joseph R. Knowland, and Marshall Hale. Joseph M. Schenck was an alternate delegate at the convention. Mayer was a delegate to the 1932 Republican National Convention with fellow Californians Knowland, Rolph, and Earl Warren. Mayer endorsed President Herbert Hoover's failed reelection bid.

During the 1934 California gubernatorial election Mayer was strongly opposed to the Democratic candidate Upton Sinclair, instead preferring the Republican Frank Merriam. Mayer's MGM and other film studios deducted a day's pay from their employees to raise an anti-Sinclair fund that amounted to $500,000. Irving Thalberg was to lead MGM's anti-Sinclair campaign and the studio recruited Carey Wilson to create a series of anti-Sinclair propaganda films. These films, directed by Felix E. Feist, included fake newsreels of Sinclair supporters who were portrayed as bums and criminals. They were shown in California movie theaters, with one episode featuring hired actors as Sinclair supporters speaking with foreign accents.

Mayer was a Freemason.

=== Horse racing hobby ===
Mayer owned or bred a number of successful thoroughbred racehorses at his ranch in Perris, California, near Los Angeles. It was considered one of the finest racing stables in the United States and raised the standards of the California racing business. Among his horses were Your Host, sire of Kelso; the 1945 U.S. Horse of the Year, Busher; and the 1959 Preakness Stakes winner, Royal Orbit. Eventually Mayer sold off the stable, partly to finance his divorce in 1947. His 248 horses brought more than $4.4 million. In 1976, Thoroughbred of California magazine named him "California Breeder of the Century".

== Death ==
Mayer died of leukemia on October 29, 1957. He was buried in the Home of Peace Cemetery in East Los Angeles, California. His sister, Ida Mayer Cummings, and brothers Jerry and Rubin also are buried there.

== Legacy ==
Mayer and his lieutenants built a company that was regarded by the public and his peers alike as the pinnacle of the movie industry. "Louis B. Mayer defined MGM, just as MGM defined Hollywood, and Hollywood defined America", writes biographer Scott Eyman.

Placed in his proper perspective, he was probably the greatest single force in the development of the motion picture industry who brought it to the heights of prosperity and influence it finally attained.

— Variety magazine

In 1951, he was given an honorary Oscar for heading MGM for over 25 years. At the event, screenwriter Charles Brackett presented the award and thanked him for guiding MGM's "production policy with foresight, aggressiveness and with a real desire for taste and quality". Mayer was also thanked for founding and developing new personalities and for bringing the Hollywood "star system into full flower".

Although Mayer was often disliked and even feared by many in the studio, editor Sam Marx explains that "his reputation is far worse than it should be. He had to be strong to do his job, and he couldn't do that without making enemies." Director Clarence Brown compared him to newspaper magnate William Randolph Hearst:

Louis B. Mayer ... made more stars than all the rest of the producers in Hollywood put together. ... He knew how to handle talent; he knew that to be successful, he had to have the most successful people in the business working for him. He was like Hearst in the newspaper business. ... He made an empire out of the thing.

Mayer never wrote or directed movies, and never pretended to tell writers what to write or art directors what to design. But he understood movies and their audience. According to Eyman, "Mayer's view of America became America's view of itself." Because of the stars, the stories, the glamour, the music, and the way they were presented, audiences the world over would often applaud the moment they saw the MGM lion. Mayer was the constant at MGM who set the tone. At Mayer's funeral in 1957, Spencer Tracy expressed Mayer's ambitions:

The story he wanted to tell was the story of America, the land for which he had an almost furious love, born of gratitude—and of contrast with the hatred in the dark land of his boyhood across the seas. It was this love of America that made him an authority on America.

== Honors and recognition ==
- Revered in his home country, Mayer has a star on Canada's Walk of Fame.
- A street in the Canadian city of Laval, Quebec a suburb of Montreal, is named Rue Louis-B-Mayer.
- The primary screening facility for Loyola Marymount University's School of Film and Television—the Mayer Theatre—is named after him. Mayer permitted the university's sports teams to use the MGM lion as their mascot.
- The main theatre at Santa Clara University bears his name.
- Mayer was inducted into the Junior Achievement U.S. Business Hall of Fame in 1990.
- The Louis B. Mayer Research Laboratories building at the Dana–Farber Cancer Institute in Boston opened in 1988.
- Mayer is enshrined in the Citizens Hall of Fame in Haverhill, Massachusetts.

== Filmography ==
=== Producer ===
Year	Title	Director
1915	Always in the Way	J. Searle Dawley
1919	Human Desire	Wilfrid North
1921	Sowing the Wind	John M. Stahl
1924	Wine of Youth	King Vidor
1924	Greed	Erich von Stroheim
1925	Lady of the Night	Monta Bell
1925	Ben-Hur	Fred Niblo
1940	I Take This Woman	W.S. Van Dyke

== Portrayals in popular culture ==
Mayer has been portrayed numerous times in film and television including:

- Harlow (1965) (by Jack Kruschen)
- Gable and Lombard (1976) (by Allen Garfield)
- Rainbow (1978) (by Martin Balsam)
- The Scarlett O'Hara War (1980) (by Harold Gould)
- Mommie Dearest (1981) (by Howard Da Silva)
- Malice in Wonderland (1985) (by Richard Dysart)
- RKO 281 (1999) (by David Suchet)
- The Three Stooges (2000) (by David Baldwin)
- Life with Judy Garland: Me and My Shadows (2001) (by Al Waxman)
- De-Lovely (2004) (by Peter Polycarpou)
- The Aviator (2004) (by Stanley DeSantis)
- Trumbo (2015) (by Richard Portnow)
- The Last Tycoon (2016) (by Saul Rubinek)
- Feud (2017) (by Kerry Stein)
- Judy (2019) (by Richard Cordery)
- Mank (2020) (by Arliss Howard)

William Saroyan wrote a short story about L. B. Mayer in his 1971 book, Letters from 74 rue Taitbout or Don't Go But If You Must Say Hello To Everybody.

=== Characters based on Mayer ===
- Pat Brady in the 1941 F. Scott Fitzgerald novel The Last Tycoon. He was played by Robert Mitchum in the 1976 film adaptation, and Kelsey Grammer in the 2016 TV series.
- Stanley Shriner Hoff in The Big Knife (1955) (by Rod Steiger) was based in part on Mayer.
- Cyril H. Bean, referred to by his employees as "The Head", in the 1966 Jacqueline Susann novel Valley of the Dolls
- Jack Lipnick in Barton Fink (1991) (by Michael Lerner, who earned an Oscar nomination for Best Supporting Actor)
- L.B. Mammoth in the animated film Cats Don't Dance (1997) (voice-acted by George Kennedy)

== See also ==
- Canadian pioneers in early Hollywood
- Selig Polyscope Company
- List of Freemasons
