= List of Judy Garland performances =

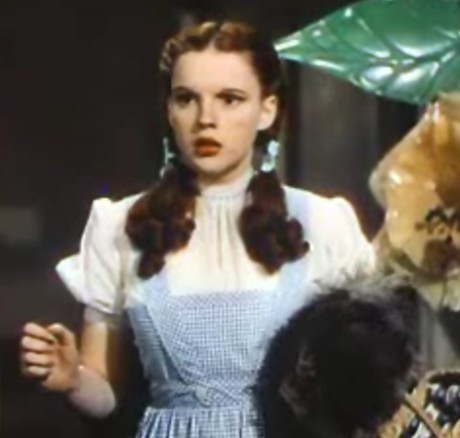
Garland as Dorothy Gale in The Wizard of Oz in 1939, the role with which she is most closely identified

In a career that spanned more than forty years, Judy Garland performed on stage, screen and television. Garland appeared in 34 feature films. She was nominated for multiple Academy Awards and Golden Globe Awards, receiving an Academy Juvenile Award and one Golden Globe. Her film career was interrupted in 1951 after she was cast in a series of films she was unable to complete, but she returned to the screen in 1954 in A Star Is Born and continued to appear in films until 1963.

Although Garland appeared in concert as early as 1943, it was only when her film career stalled that she began regular concert appearances, beginning with a critically acclaimed 1951 concert series at the London Palladium. Garland set a record when she appeared for 19 weeks at the Palace Theatre in New York City, also in 1951, and her 1961 concert Judy at Carnegie Hall is often considered one of the greatest nights in show business history. She continued to tour until just three months prior to her death in 1969.

Garland starred in a series of television specials beginning in 1955, when she appeared in the first episode of Ford Star Jubilee. The success of these specials led CBS to offer Garland a regular series. The Judy Garland Show premiered in 1963. Although the show was critically well-received, it suffered in the Nielsen ratings from being scheduled across from Bonanza, which was then the most popular show on the air. The Judy Garland Show was canceled after one season but Garland and the series were nominated for Emmy Awards.

== Filmography ==
=== Feature films ===
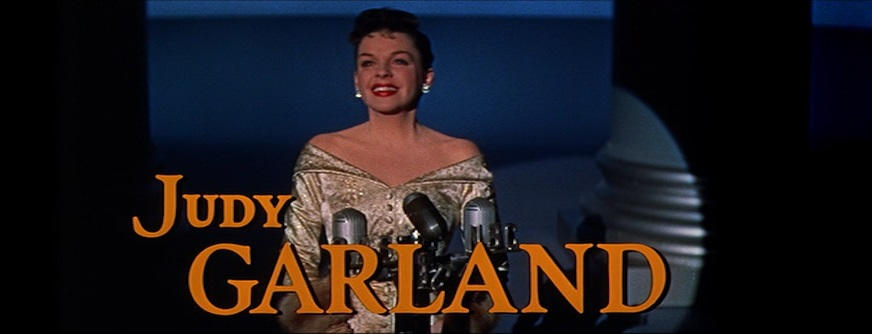
Judy Garland as Vicki Lester in A Star Is Born

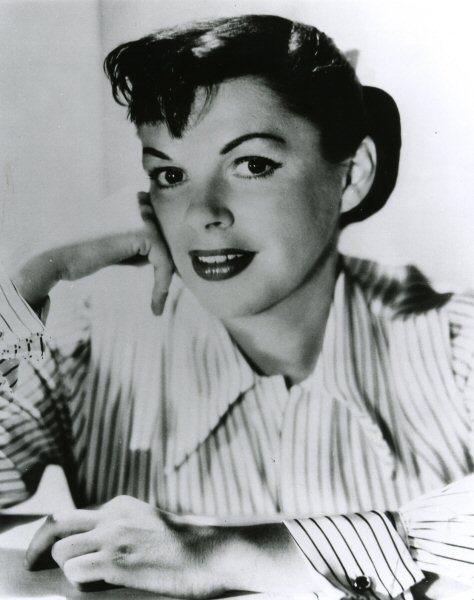
Garland in a 1954 publicity still

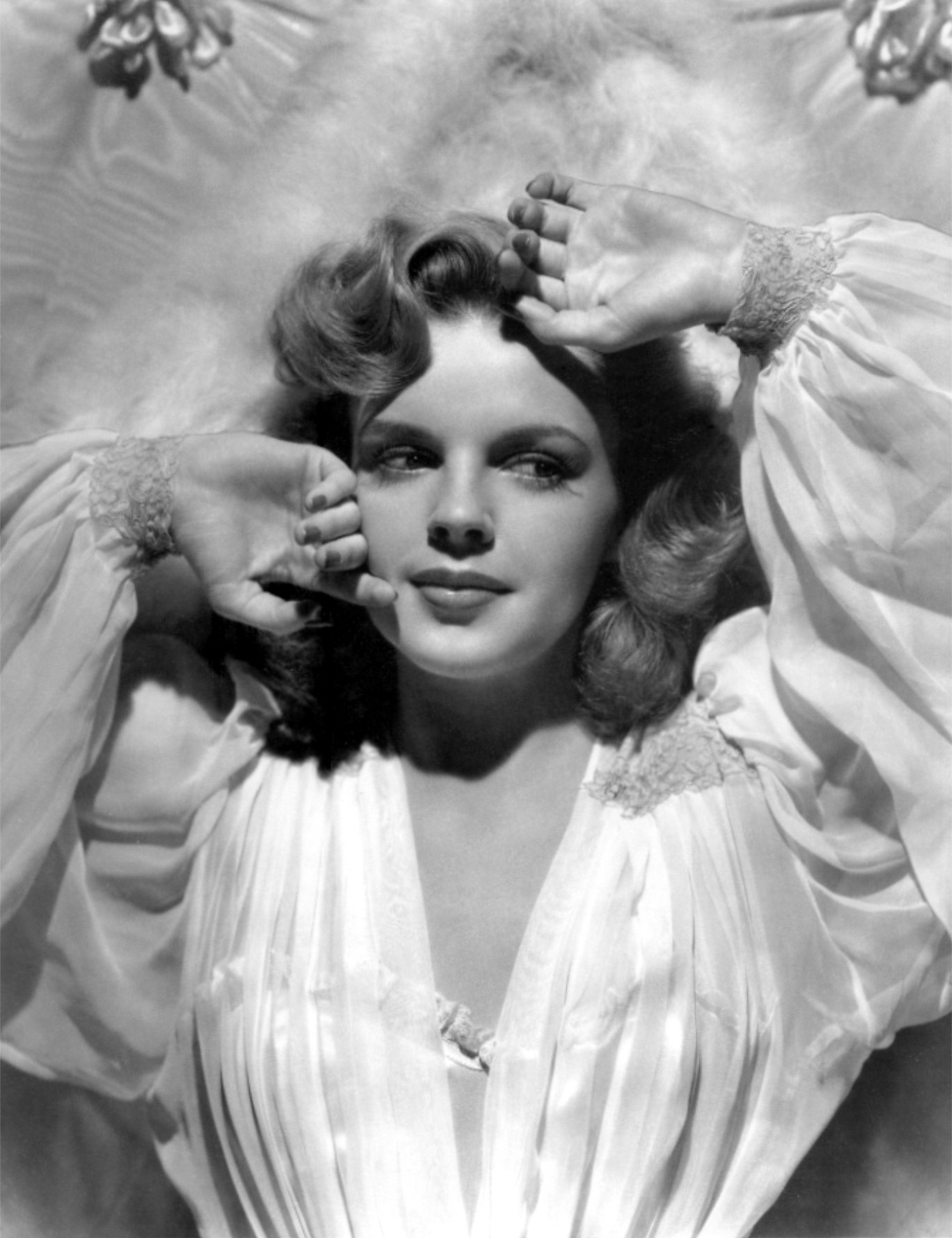
Garland given the Hollywood "glamor treatment" for her role in Presenting Lily Mars

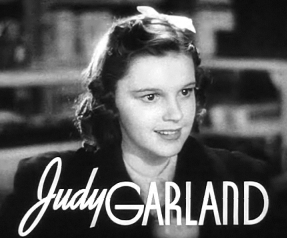
Garland in Love Finds Andy Hardy (1938)

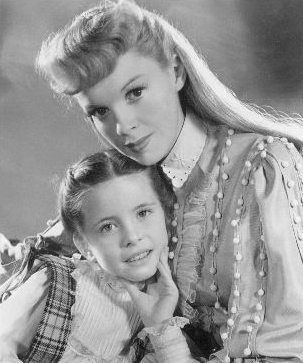
Garland with Margaret O'Brien in 1944

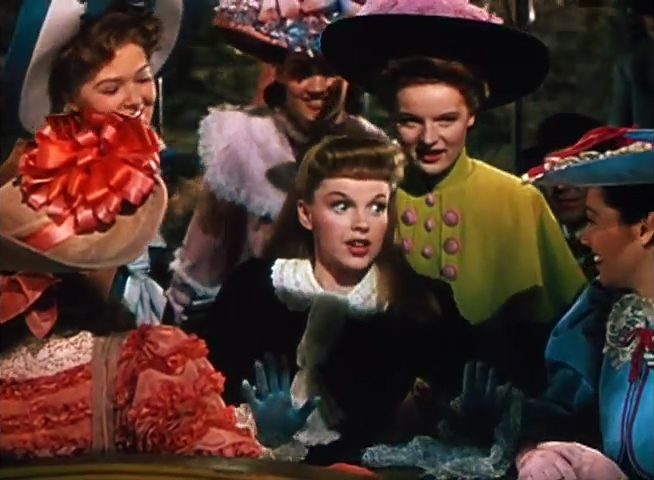
Garland performing "The Trolley Song" in Meet Me in St. Louis

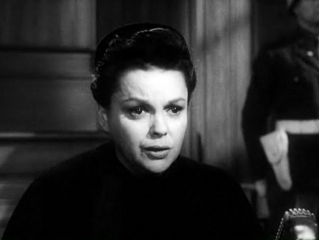
Garland as Mrs. Wallner in Judgment at Nuremberg

Title	Year	Role	Director	Studio	Notes
Pigskin Parade	1936	Sairy Dodd	David Butler	20th Century Fox	
Broadway Melody of 1938	1937	Betty Clayton	Roy Del Ruth	Metro-Goldwyn-Mayer	
Thoroughbreds Don't Cry	1937	Cricket West	Alfred E. Green	Metro-Goldwyn-Mayer	
Everybody Sing	1938	Judy Bellaire	Edwin L. Marin	Metro-Goldwyn-Mayer	
Love Finds Andy Hardy	1938	Betsy Booth	George B. Seitz	Metro-Goldwyn-Mayer	
Listen, Darling	1938	"Pinkie" Wingate	Edwin L. Marin	Metro-Goldwyn-Mayer	
The Wizard of Oz	1939	Dorothy Gale	Victor Fleming	Metro-Goldwyn-Mayer	Garland was honored with an Academy Juvenile Award (Note: "for her outstanding performance as a screen juvenile during the past year" for The Wizard of Oz and Babes in Arms.)
Babes in Arms	1939	Patsy Barton	Busby Berkeley	Metro-Goldwyn-Mayer	Garland was honored with an Academy Juvenile Award
Andy Hardy Meets Debutante	1940	Betsy Booth	George B. Seitz	Metro-Goldwyn-Mayer	
Strike Up the Band	1940	Mary Holden	Busby Berkeley	Metro-Goldwyn-Mayer	
Little Nellie Kelly	1940	Nellie Noonan Kelly / Little Nellie Kelly	Norman Taurog	Metro-Goldwyn-Mayer	
Ziegfeld Girl	1941	Susan Gallagher	Robert Z. Leonard	Metro-Goldwyn-Mayer	
Life Begins for Andy Hardy	1941	Betsy Booth	George B. Seitz	Metro-Goldwyn-Mayer	
Babes on Broadway	1941	Penny Morris	Busby Berkeley	Metro-Goldwyn-Mayer	
For Me and My Gal	1942	Jo Hayden	Busby Berkeley	Metro-Goldwyn-Mayer	
Presenting Lily Mars	1943	Lily Mars	Norman Taurog	Metro-Goldwyn-Mayer	
Thousands Cheer	1943	Herself (guest star)	George Sidney	Metro-Goldwyn-Mayer	Performed "The Joint Is Really Jumpin' Down at Carnegie Hall"
Girl Crazy	1943	Ginger Gray	Norman Taurog	Metro-Goldwyn-Mayer	
Meet Me in St. Louis	1944	Esther Smith	Vincente Minnelli	Metro-Goldwyn-Mayer	
The Clock	1945	Alice Mayberry	Vincente Minnelli	Metro-Goldwyn-Mayer	
Ziegfeld Follies	1945	The Star	Vincente Minnelli	Metro-Goldwyn-Mayer	"The Great Lady Has An Interview" segment
The Harvey Girls	1946	Susan Bradley	George Sidney	Metro-Goldwyn-Mayer	
Till the Clouds Roll By	1946	Marilyn Miller	Vincente Minnelli	Metro-Goldwyn-Mayer	
The Pirate	1948	Manuela Ava	Vincente Minnelli	Metro-Goldwyn-Mayer	
Easter Parade	1948	Hannah Brown	Charles Walters	Metro-Goldwyn-Mayer	
Words and Music	1948	Herself (guest star)	Norman Taurog	Metro-Goldwyn-Mayer	Performed "I Wish I Were in Love Again" and "Johnny One Note"
In the Good Old Summertime	1949	Veronica Fisher	Robert Z. Leonard	Metro-Goldwyn-Mayer	
Summer Stock	1950	Jane Falbury	Charles Walters	Metro-Goldwyn-Mayer	
A Star Is Born	1954	Esther Blodgett / Vicki Lester	George Cukor	Warner Bros.	Golden Globe Award for Best Actress – Motion Picture Comedy or Musical; Nominated—Academy Award for Best Actress; Nominated—BAFTA Award for Best Foreign Actress; Nominated—New York Film Critics Circle Award for Best Actress
Pepe	1960	Herself (voice only)	George Sidney	Columbia	Performed "The Faraway Part of Town"
Judgment at Nuremberg	1961	Irene Hoffmann-Wallner	Stanley Kramer	United Artists	Nominated—Academy Award for Best Supporting Actress; Nominated—Golden Globe Award for Best Supporting Actress – Motion Picture; Nominated—Laurel Award for Top Female Supporting Performance
Gay Purr-ee	1962	Mewsette (voice only)	Abe Levitow	Warner Bros.	
A Child Is Waiting	1963	Jean Hansen	John Cassavetes	United Artists	
I Could Go On Singing	1963	Jenny Bowman	Ronald Neame	United Artists	

=== Short subjects ===
Title	Year	Role	Director	Studio	Notes
The Big Revue	1929	Herself (with the Gumm Sisters)	—N/a	Mayfair Pictures	
A Holiday in Storyland	1930	Herself (with the Gumm Sisters)	Roy Mack	Warner Bros.	Lost; includes Garland's first solo number, "Blue Butterfly"
Bubbles	1930	Herself (with the Gumm Sisters)	Roy Mack	Warner Bros.	
The Wedding of Jack and Jill	1930	Herself (with the Gumm Sisters)	Roy Mack	Warner Bros.	Lost
La Fiesta de Santa Barbara	1935	Herself (with the Gumm Sisters)	Louis Lewyn	Metro-Goldwyn-Mayer	
Every Sunday	1936	Judy	Felix E. Feist	Metro-Goldwyn-Mayer	First role at Metro-Goldwyn-Mayer
Silent Night	1937	Herself	—N/a	Metro-Goldwyn-Mayer	Performed "Silent Night" with St Luke's Episcopal Church Choristers of Long Beach
If I Forget You	1940	Herself	—N/a	Metro-Goldwyn-Mayer	Performed "If I Forget You" for the Will Rogers Memorial Fund
We Must Have Music	1942	Susan Gallagher	—N/a	Metro-Goldwyn-Mayer	Performed "We Must Have Music" musical number deleted from Ziegfeld Girl

== Unfinished films ==
Title	Year	Role	Notes
The Barkleys of Broadway	1949	Dinah Barkley	Garland was taking prescription sleeping medication along with illicitly obtained pills containing morphine. These in combination with migraine headaches led Garland to miss several shooting days in a row. After being advised by Garland's doctor that she would only be able to work in four- to five-day increments with extended rest periods between, MGM executive Arthur Freed suspended Garland on July 18, 1948. She was replaced with Ginger Rogers.
Annie Get Your Gun	1950	Annie Oakley	Garland was nervous at the prospect of playing Annie Oakley—a role strongly identified with Ethel Merman—anxious about appearing in an unglamorous role after breaking from juvenile parts for several years and disturbed by her treatment at the hands of director Busby Berkeley. She began arriving late to the set and would sometimes not show up at all. She was suspended from the picture on May 10, 1949, and replaced with Betty Hutton.
Royal Wedding	1951	Ellen Bowen	Having been called in to replace a pregnant June Allyson, Garland again failed to report to the set on multiple occasions after costume tests and rehearsals with Fred Astaire and director Charles Walters. The studio suspended her contract on June 17, 1950, and replaced her with Jane Powell.
Valley of the Dolls	1967	Helen Lawson	Garland was cast as Helen Lawson in the film version of Jacqueline Susann's bestseller featuring the character of Neely O'Hara, depicted by Patty Duke. Neely was largely based upon Garland herself. As with previous projects, Garland missed days of work, blew repeated takes and delayed production by refusing to leave her dressing room. She was replaced in April 1967 with Susan Hayward. However, Patty Duke tells another story – that the director kept Garland waiting for hours until late in the day, by which time she was either too tired or too nervous to perform. Another star of the film, Barbara Parkins, also defended Garland, stating on numerous occasions that "Miss Hayward was a pale imitation of what Garland could have made of the role."

== Box office ranking ==
At the height of her career, Garland was regularly ranked among the top movie stars in the US in the annual poll conducted by Quigley publishing:

- 1940 – 10th
- 1941 – 10th
- 1942 – 19th
- 1943 – 11th
- 1944 – 14th
- 1945 – 9th
- 1946 – 25th
- 1950 – 25th

== Concerts ==
Garland appeared in concert over 1,100 times. Listed below are some of her key concert performances.

Date	Location	Notes
July 10, 1943	Philadelphia	Gave first solo concert at the Robin Hood Dell; Andre Kostelanetz conducted the orchestra.
April 9, 1951	London	Garland opened her new show at the London Palladium; the show performed twice nightly with Wednesday and Saturday matinees.
July 1, 1951	Dublin	Performed in Ireland at the Theatre Royal, Dublin for 14 sold-out performances where her show was performed for 50,000 people which was unprecedented for the time. Upon arrival in Dublin, she was met by huge crowds to whom she sang from her dressing room window.
October 16, 1951	New York City	The legendary Palace Theater opening – the show ran for 19 weeks and broke all box office records. She returned from 11/16/51–2/24/52.
1956	Las Vegas, Nevada at the New Frontier Hotel	Garland performed a four-week stand for a salary of $55,000 per week, making her the highest-paid entertainer to work in Las Vegas to date. Despite a brief bout of laryngitis, her performances there were so successful that her run was extended an extra week.
May 11, 1959	New York City	Opened at the Metropolitan Opera House, in New York for a 7 night run.
October 3, 5, 1960	Paris	Palais de Chaillot, dubbed by French critics "La Piaf Americaine"
October 28, 29, 1960	Paris	Concert at the famed Olympia
October 1960	Amsterdam	The concert is broadcast live on European radio and is considered to be on a par with the Carnegie Hall performance the following year.
April 23, 1961	New York City	The legendary concert at Carnegie Hall.
September 16, 1961	Los Angeles, California	Performed the Carnegie Hall concert at the Hollywood Bowl to sold-out audience in spite of heavy rain.
May 1964	Sydney/Melbourne	Perhaps Garland's most unsuccessful tour and caused much controversy. The reviews for the two Sydney concerts were positive. However, the Melbourne portion of the tour was a disaster for her. The audience was angry over her late appearance, so much that she was unable to remember lyrics and slurred those that she did remember. She walked off the stage in tears after only 20 minutes and three numbers. It was the first time in her career that she had received negative notices and where she had been heckled and jeered by an audience. Later in Hong Kong she made an unpublicised suicide bid.
November 8, 15, 1964	London	Performed at the London Palladium with daughter Liza Minnelli in a one-off event for ITV. The concert was recorded and released as a 2 record album LP set by Capitol Records
July 31, 1967	New York City	Returned to the Palace Theatre for a 4-week sold-out run.
August 31, 1967	Boston	Largest audience; over 100,000 people attended her free outdoor concert on the Boston Common
December 25, 27, 1967	New York City	Appeared at Madison Square Garden's Felt Forum T theater
July 20, 1968	Philadelphia	Appeared at JFK Stadium, her last concert in the U.S.
March 25, 1969	Copenhagen, Denmark	Garland's final concert, at the Falkoner Centre in Copenhagen

== Television ==
Key Garland television appearances include:

Date	Title	Network	Notes
September 24, 1955	Ford Star Jubilee	CBS	The first full-scale color telecast on CBS.
April 8, 1956	Judy Garland Musical Special	CBS	Slated to be the first of a series of CBS specials under a three-year, $300,000 contract with Garland, this was the only one produced before the relationship between Garland and husband Sid Luft and CBS broke down in a dispute over the planned format of upcoming specials.
February 25, 1962	The Judy Garland Show	CBS	Featured Frank Sinatra and Dean Martin. Nominated for four Emmy Awards.
March 19, 1963	Judy Garland and Her Guests Phil Silvers and Robert Goulet	CBS	Nominated for an Emmy.
September 29, 1963 – March 29, 1964	The Judy Garland Show	CBS	Garland's only regular series. Canceled after one season and 26 episodes. Garland and the series were Emmy-nominated.
December 1, 1964	Judy and Liza at the London Palladium	ITV	Broadcast of the November 1964 appearance with Liza Minnelli.
December 1968	The Merv Griffin Show	First run syndication	
January 19, 1969	Sunday Night at the London Palladium	ITV	
September 15, 2002	Curb Your Enthusiasm	HBO	Season 3, Episode 1: Chet’s Shirt; Archive footage

== Radio appearances ==
For a list of songs performed on the radio, see: Radio recordings (1935–1961)

Date	Program	Episode
1940-10-28	Lux Radio Theatre	"Strike Up the Band"
1941-01-26	Silver Theater	"Love's New Sweet Song"
1941-11-09	The Screen Guild Theater	"Babes in Arms"
1941-11-17	Lux Radio Theatre	"Merton of the Movies"
1942-10-12	Lux Radio Theatre	"Morning Glory"
1942-12-28	Lux Radio Theatre	"A Star Is Born"
1943-03-22	The Screen Guild Theater	"For Me and My Gal"
1945-02-15	"Command Performance" Armed Forces Radio Service (AFRS)	"Dick Tracy In B-Flat or For Goodness Sakes, Isn't He Ever Going To Marry Tess Trueheart?"
1946-01-28	Lux Radio Theatre	"The Clock"
1946-11-21	Suspense	"Drive-In"
1946-12-02	Lux Radio Theatre	"Meet Me in St. Louis"
1950-12-25	Lux Radio Theatre	"The Wizard of Oz"
1953-02-16	Lux Radio Theatre	"Lady in the Dark"

== See also ==
- Judy Garland discography
- List of awards and honors received by Judy Garland
- List of Judy Garland biographies

== Bibliography ==
- Clarke, Gerald (2000). Get Happy: The Life of Judy Garland. New York, Random House. ISBN 0-375-50378-1.
- DiOrio, Jr., Al (1973). Little Girl Lost: The Life and Hard Times of Judy Garland. Manor Books.
- Edwards, Anne (1975). Judy Garland. Simon and Schuster. ISBN 0-671-80228-3 (paperback edition).
- Finch, Christopher (1975). Rainbow: The Stormy Life of Judy Garland. Ballantine Books. ISBN 0-345-25173-3 (paperback edition).
- Frank, Gerold (1975). Judy. Harper & Row. ISBN 0-306-80894-3.
- Sanders, Coyne Steven (1990). Rainbow's End: The Judy Garland Show. Zebra Books. ISBN 0-8217-3708-2 (paperback edition).
- Seaman, Barbara (1996). Lovely Me: The Life of Jacqueline Susann. New York, Seven Stories Press. ISBN 978-1-888363-37-1 (1996 edition).
- Shipman, David (1975). Judy Garland, The Secret Life of an American Legend. Harper & Row. ISBN 0-7868-8026-0 (paperback edition).
- St. Johns, Adela Rogers (1974). Some Are Born Great. Doubleday & Company.
- Armstrong, Greg; Neill, Andy (2024). When We Was Fab: Inside the Beatles Australasian Tour 1964. Woodslane Press, Warriewood NSW, Australia. ISBN 978-1-922800-68-8.
