= List of awards and nominations received by Judy Garland =

Judy Garland awards and nominations
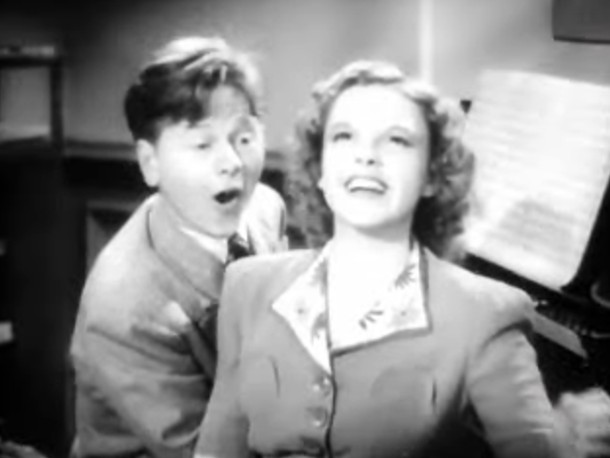
- Garland as Patsy Barton (alongside Mickey Rooney) in Babes in Arms, one of her two 1939 films for which she received an Academy Juvenile Award
Awards and nominations
| Award | Wins | Nominations |
| Academy Awards | 0 | 2 |
| Golden Globe Awards | 1 | 2 |
| Grammy Awards | 2 | 5 |
| Emmy Awards | 0 | 3 |

Totals (Note: Certain award groups do not simply award one winner. They acknowledge several different recipients, have runners-up, and have third place. Since this is a specific recognition and is different from losing an award, runner-up mentions are considered wins in this award tally. For simplification and to avoid errors, each award in this list has been presumed to have had a prior nomination.)
- Wins: 13
- Nominations: 20

Judy Garland received numerous awards and honors during her 40-year career. Garland won or was nominated for awards for her work in motion pictures, television, music recording, and on stage. She was twice nominated for an Academy Award, and was awarded a special Academy Juvenile Award in 1940. Garland won a Golden Globe Award and was nominated for a second. She was nominated for three Emmy Awards, including one for The Judy Garland Show in 1964. She received a special Tony Award for her record-breaking concert run at New York City's Palace Theatre. Garland won two Grammy Awards for her concert album Judy at Carnegie Hall.

Garland has also received a number of posthumous awards and honors. She was the recipient of a Grammy Lifetime Achievement Award, and several of her recordings have been inducted into the Grammy Hall of Fame. She has twice been honored on United States postage stamps, and has two stars on the Hollywood Walk of Fame. The American Film Institute has repeatedly recognized her talent, placing Garland eighth on its list of the top 100 female stars of all time and placing five of her recordings in its list of the 100 best songs from films, including "Over the Rainbow" at number one.

== Major associations ==
=== Academy Awards ===
The Academy Awards, popularly known as the Oscars, are presented annually by the American Academy of Motion Picture Arts and Sciences (AMPAS) to recognize excellence of professionals in the film industry. Garland was nominated for two competitive awards, and was the recipient of an Academy Juvenile Award.

| Year | Category | Nominated work | Result |
|---|---|---|---|
| 1939 | Academy Juvenile Award | The Wizard of Oz / Babes in Arms | Honored |
| 1954 | Best Actress | A Star Is Born | Nominated |
| 1961 | Best Supporting Actress | Judgment at Nuremberg | Nominated |

=== Emmy Awards ===
The Academy of Television Arts & Sciences (ATAS) honors national prime time television entertainment. Garland was nominated for three Emmys.

| Year | Category | Nominated work | Result |
|---|---|---|---|
| 1956 | Best Female Singer | | Nominated |
| 1962 | Outstanding Performance in a Variety or Musical Program | The Judy Garland Show (special) | Nominated |
| 1964 | Outstanding Performance in a Variety or Musical Program | The Judy Garland Show | Nominated |

=== Golden Globes Awards ===
The Golden Globe Awards are presented annually by the Hollywood Foreign Press Association (HFPA) to recognize outstanding achievements in the entertainment industry, both domestic and foreign, and to focus wide public attention upon the best in motion pictures and television. Garland won one competitive award, and was nominated for a second.

| Year | Category | Nominated work | Result |
|---|---|---|---|
| 1954 | Best Actress – Motion Picture Musical or Comedy | A Star Is Born | Won |
| 1961 | Best Supporting Actress – Motion Picture | Judgment at Nuremberg | Nominated |
| 1961 | Cecil B. DeMille Award | | Honored |

=== Grammy Awards ===
The Grammy Awards are presented annually by the National Academy of Recording Arts and Sciences of the United States for outstanding achievements in the music industry. Garland won two Grammys during her lifetime, and was post-humously awarded the Lifetime Achievement Award. The Grammy Hall of Fame Award is a special Grammy award established in 1973 to honor recordings that are at least twenty-five years old and that have "qualitative or historical significance". As of 2011, six of Garland's recordings have received the award.

| Year | Category | Nominated work | Result |
Grammy Awards
| 1962 | Album of the Year | Judy at Carnegie Hall | Won |
| 1962 | Female Solo Vocal Performance | Judy at Carnegie Hall | Won |
| 1966 | Best Album Notes | 25th Anniversary: Retrospective | Nominated |
| 1971 | Best Album Notes | Judy. London. 1969 | Nominated |
| 1995 | Best Historical Album | Judy: Complete Decca Masters | Nominated |
| 1999 | Grammy Lifetime Achievement Award | | Honored |
Grammy Hall of Fame Award
| 1981 | Grammy Hall of Fame | "Over the Rainbow" | Inducted |
| 1998 | Grammy Hall of Fame | "(Dear Mr. Gable) You Made Me Love You" | Inducted |
| 1998 | Grammy Hall of Fame | Judy at Carnegie Hall | Inducted |
| 2005 | Grammy Hall of Fame | Meet Me In St. Louis - Soundtrack | Inducted |
| 2006 | Grammy Hall of Fame | The Wizard of Oz – Musical and Dramatic Selections Recorded Directly from the Soundtrack of MGM's Technicolor Film | Inducted |
| 2010 | Grammy Hall of Fame | "For Me and My Gal" (with Gene Kelly) | Inducted |

Judy at Carnegie Hall won two more Grammys: for Best Engineering Contribution – Popular Recording (Robert Arnold), and Best Album Cover - Non-Classical (Jim Silke).

=== Tony Awards ===
The Antoinette Perry Awards for Excellence in Theatre, more commonly known as the Tony Awards, recognize achievement in live American theatre, and are presented by the American Theatre Wing and The Broadway League. Judy Garland won a Special Tony Award in 1952 for her contributions to the revival of Vaudeville with her record-breaking 19-week stand at the Palace Theatre in New York City.

| Year | Category | Nominated work | Result |
|---|---|---|---|
| 1952 | Special Tony Award | | Received |

== Other honors ==
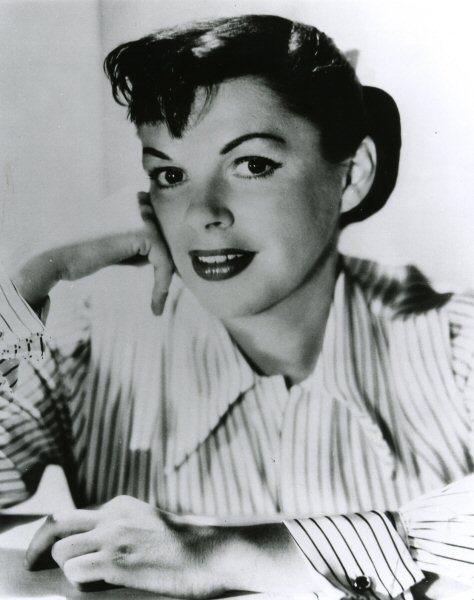
Publicity still for A Star Is Born (1954)

Since 1975, Garland's birthplace of Grand Rapids, Minnesota, has held a yearly Judy Garland Festival in June. At the 2006 festival, Minnesota governor Tim Pawlenty and lieutenant governor Carol Molnau proclaimed June 22 to be "Judy Garland Day", recognizing and honoring Judy Garland for her dedication and exemplary achievements and to salute her as an outstanding citizen and patron of the Arts. Her children Lorna and Joey Luft were in attendance. Also in 1975, The Judy Garland Museum opened in Grand Rapids. The museum, dedicated to honoring Garland's talent and legacy, is financially supported in part by the Judy Garland Heirs Trust and has the personal support of all of Garland's children. Garland's childhood home in Grand Rapids opened to the public in 1995. The museum claims to hold the largest collection of Judy Garland memorabilia in the world.

Garland has twice been honored with commemorative postage stamps. In 1989, the United States Postal Service issued a series of "Classic Films" postage stamps, to honor the 50th anniversary of films made in the United States in 1939 that were nominated for Academy Awards. These 25¢ stamps featured four films: The Wizard of Oz, Gone with the Wind, Stagecoach, and Beau Geste. The post office issued a stamp in 2006 honoring Garland in the "Legends of Hollywood" series. The stamp depicts Garland as Vicki Lester from A Star Is Born, and was painted by illustrator Tim O'Brien. The first day ceremony for this stamp was on June 10, 2006, on what would have been Garland's 84th birthday, in New York City with nationwide availability on June 12. The ceremony at New York's Carnegie Hall featured her daughter, Lorna Luft, Turner Classic Movies host Robert Osborne, Dick Cavett, Michael Feinstein, Rufus Wainwright, Terrence McNally, and Garland's MGM colleagues Jane Powell and Margaret O'Brien. Garland's daughter Liza Minnelli taped a special greeting exclusively for the ceremony.

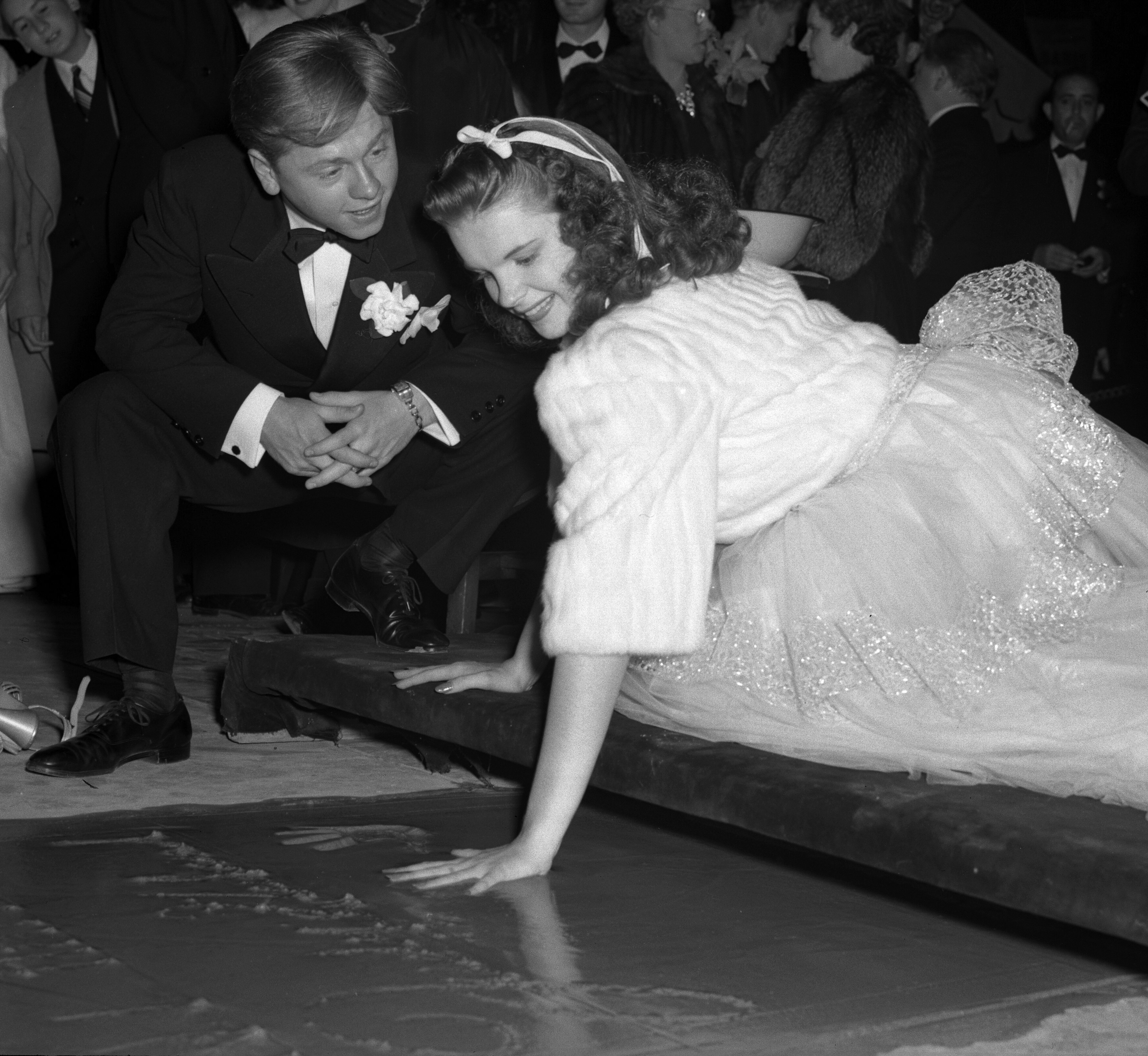
Mickey Rooney watches Judy Garland put her handprint into cement at Grauman's Chinese Theatre, 1939

The American Film Institute has twice recognized Garland and her talents. In 1999 the AFI named Garland eighth among the Greatest Female Stars of All Time. The AFI in 2004 chose Garland's performance of "Over the Rainbow" as the number one movie song of all time, as part of its "100 Years...100 Songs" list. Four more Garland songs were featured on the list: "Have Yourself a Merry Little Christmas" from Meet Me in St. Louis (#76); "Get Happy" from Summer Stock (#61); "The Trolley Song", also from Meet Me in St. Louis (#26); and "The Man That Got Away" from A Star Is Born (#11).

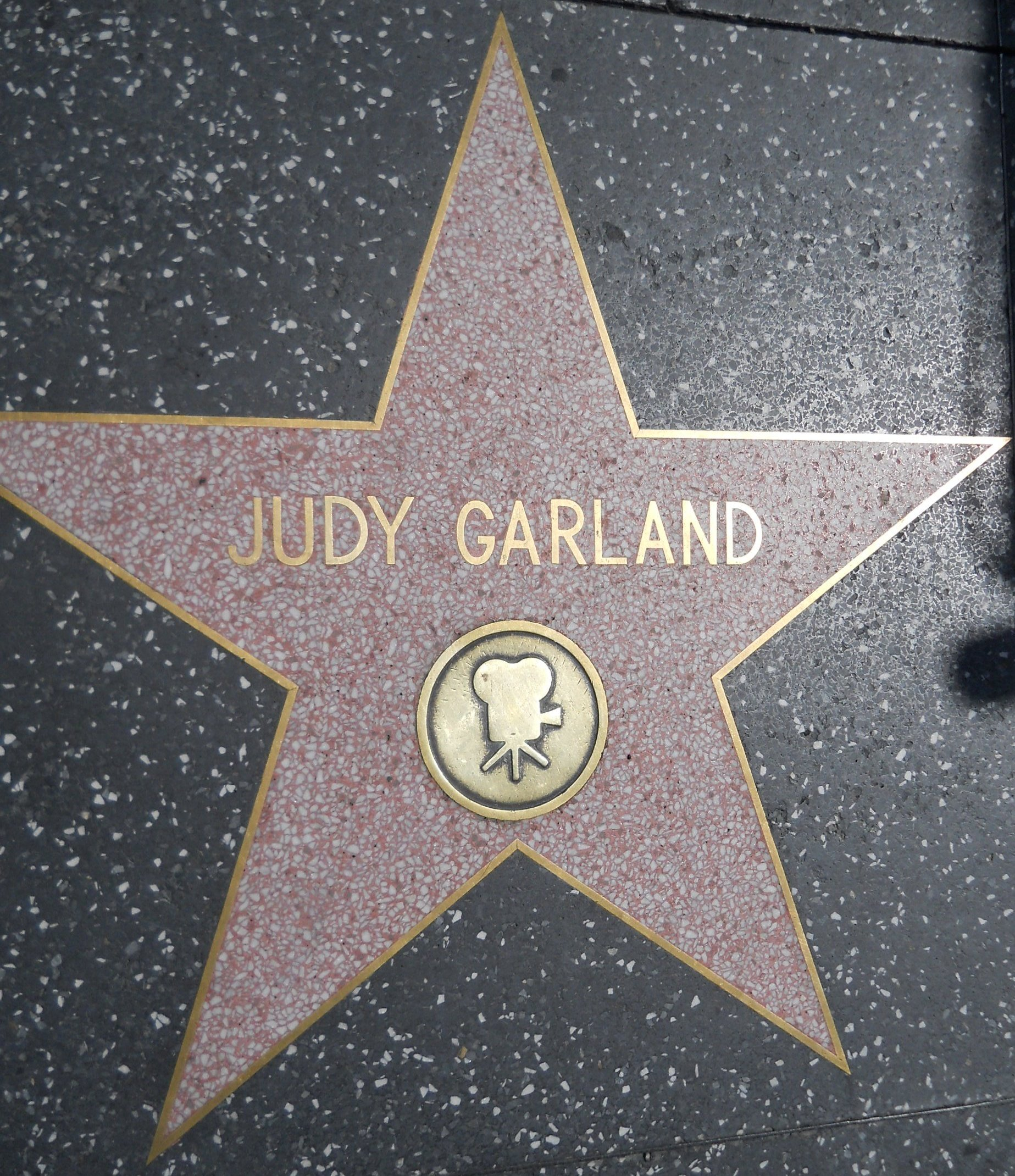
Star for recognition of film work at 1715 Vine Street on the Hollywood Walk of Fame. She has another for recording at 6764 Hollywood Blvd.

Garland's rendition of "Over the Rainbow" was also honored as number one in the 2001 Songs of the Century project, by the Recording Industry Association of America and the National Endowment for the Arts. The list was assembled for young people to "help further appreciation for the music development process, including songwriting, musicianship, recording, performing, distributing and the development of distribution and cultural values."

In 2003, the National Recording Preservation Board selected Judy at Carnegie Hall for preservation in the National Recording Registry.

Thirteen years later, in 2016, the board selected her rendition of "Over the Rainbow" for preservation in the same registry, making her the first person to have two recordings preserved in the registry.

Sigma Chi at the Ohio State University initiated Garland as a Sweetheart of Sigma Chi in 1938. A new breed of rose was introduced in 1977, dedicated to Garland. The Judy Garland Rose has yellow petals with bright red tips. Garland was inducted into the Minnesota Music Hall of Fame located in New Ulm, Minnesota in 1991.

Judy Garland has two stars on the Hollywood Walk of Fame - one for motion pictures (located at 1715 Vine St.), and one for recording (located at 6764 Hollywood Blvd.). Her hand- and footprints were preserved in cement in 1939 at Grauman's Chinese Theatre.

On what would have been Garland's 88th birthday, June 10, 2010, Madame Tussauds Hollywood unveiled a wax figure of Garland.

== See also ==
- List of Judy Garland biographies
- List of Judy Garland performances
