= The Barkleys of Broadway =

1949 film by Charles Walters

- Theatrical release poster
- Directed by: Charles Walters
- Written by: Betty Comden; Adolph Green; Sidney Sheldon (uncredited)
- Produced by: Arthur Freed
- Starring: Fred Astaire; Ginger Rogers; Oscar Levant; Billie Burke; Gale Robbins; Jacques François
- Cinematography: Harry Stradling
- Edited by: Albert Akst
- Music by: Lennie Hayton
- Distributed by: Metro-Goldwyn-Mayer
- Release date: May 4, 1949 (New York)
- Running time: 109 minutes
- Country: United States
- Language: English
- Budget: $2.2 million
- Box office: $4.4 million

The Barkleys of Broadway is a 1949 American Technicolor musical comedy film produced by Metro-Goldwyn-Mayer (MGM), which reunited Fred Astaire and Ginger Rogers after ten years apart. Directed by Charles Walters, the screenplay was written by Betty Comden, Adolph Green, and Sidney Sheldon.

The songs were composed by Harry Warren and Ira Gershwin with the addition of "They Can't Take That Away from Me" by George and Ira Gershwin, and the choreography was created by Robert Alton and Hermes Pan.

The Barkleys of Broadway is notably known as the final film that Astaire and Rogers made together, and their only film together shot in Technicolor. Rogers came in as a last-minute replacement for Judy Garland, whose frequent absences due to a dependence on prescription medication cost her the role.

== Plot ==
Josh and Dinah Barkley are a husband-and-wife musical comedy team at the peak of their careers. After the opening night of their latest musical, the couple take a limousine ride to Mrs. Belney's afterparty. During the ride, Josh mildly criticizes Dinah's acting skills. When they arrive at the party, Dinah meets French playwright Jacques Pierre Barredout, who suggests that Dinah should quit musical comedy and do dramatic acting. As Josh waits outside and prepared to leave, he returns inside and finds Dinah and Jacques together. When the couple arrive home, Josh accuses Dinah of flirting with Jacques. Dinah then tells Josh that Jacques has encouraged her to be a dramatic actress, but Josh believes she should stay in musical theater.

Sometime later, Bert Felsher, the musical's director, feels Josh and Dinah's temperamental relationship is affecting the show. He and Ezra Millar, a musical composer and friend of the Barkleys, introduce the couple to Shirlene May, who has been hired as Dinah's understudy. At an art gallery, the Barkleys attend an exhibition, where Jacques and Mrs. Belney invite the couple for a country trip. However, Dinah declines the invitation. The Barkleys soon return to their Broadway musical and perform a Scottish musical number.

Backstage, the couple decide to take a weekend vacation in Danbridge, and accompany themselves with Ezra. While Josh and Ezra golf at the country club, Dinah discusses Jacques's new play, a dramatization of the life of Sarah Bernhardt, with actress Pamela Driscoll to star in. Dinah however criticizes this casting suggestion and proposes herself as the better choice, in which Jacques agrees.

Back in New York, Dinah secretly rehearses for the lead role in Jacques's play. Josh discovers this, and accuses her of having an affair with the playwright. From there, the Barkleys announce their separation as Josh proceeds to perform solo in his next musical while Dinah auditions for Jacques's play. At Dinah's audition, Ezra fails to persuade her to perform at a hospital benefit concert by claiming Josh will not attend.

Backstage, with Josh, Ezra tells him that Dinah is struggling in her auditions. Interested, Josh secretly watches Dinah's rehearsals. He returns to have dinner with Ezra and Shirlene, where he believes in Dinah's dramatic abilities but he believes Jacques is giving Dinah unclear direction. Josh leaves the dinner table, and impersonates Jacques over the phone. He gives her advice to help improve her performance and as a result, Dinah gives an impressive audition.

At the benefit concert, Ezra performs a piano piece with an orchestra. Josh and Dinah reunite backstage and are prompted by Ezra to give an impromptu song-and-dance performance. After the performance, Dinah declines any potential reunion, feeling Josh has taken her for granted. Jacques's new play The Young Sarah opens and Dinah's performance receives positive reviews. Josh impersonates Jacques once more to congratulate her. However, the real Jacques arrives in Dinah's dressing room.

Realizing the deception, Dinah rushes into Josh's apartment. When he arrives, Josh states they will still divorce as he has fallen in love with Shirlene. Before she leaves, Dinah reveals that she knew about Josh's impersonation. Josh acknowledges this and congratulates Dinah in person. The two reunite as a musical team.

== Cast ==
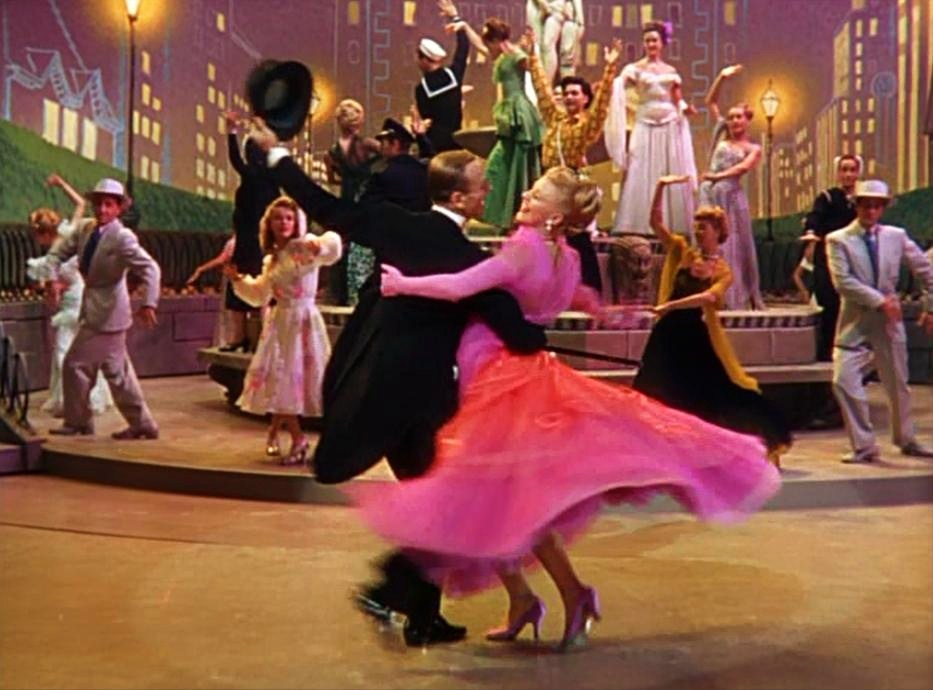
Fred Astaire and Ginger Rogers were reunited as a dance team, their only non-RKO film.

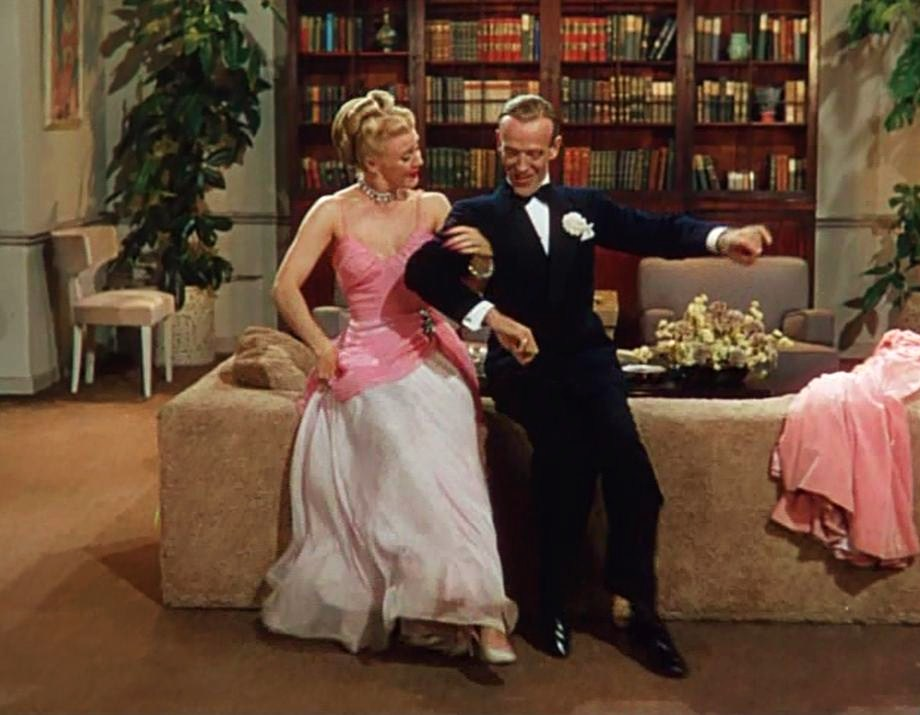

- Fred Astaire as Josh Barkley
- Ginger Rogers as Dinah Barkley
- Oscar Levant as Ezra Millar
- Billie Burke as Mrs. Livingston Belney
- Gale Robbins as Shirlene May
- Jacques François as Jacques Pierre Barredout
- George Zucco as The Judge
- Clinton Sundberg as Bert Felsher
- Inez Cooper as Pamela Driscoll
- Carol Brewster as Gloria Amboy
- Wilson Wood as Larry

== Production ==
The Barkleys of Broadway was conceived under the working title You Made Me Love You, with Judy Garland and Fred Astaire intended to reunite after Easter Parade (1948). Even before the film's release, in March 1948, screenwriters Betty Comden and Adolph Green delivered an original script about Josh and Dinah Barkley, a successful Broadway husband-and-wife team, whose careers split when Dinah decides to become a dramatic actress. Roger Edens suggested the title be changed to The Barkleys of Broadway.

When the film went into rehearsals, it became clear Garland would not be physically and emotionally able to complete the film. On the afternoon of July 12, 1948, Arthur Freed telephoned Garland's physician, who advised that having her continue the film would be a "risky procedure". He also suggested Garland could work for four or five days under medication before needing to stop. Freed therefore placed Garland on suspension. Freed contacted Ginger Rogers to see if she was interested in reuniting with Astaire. There had been rumors, denied by both, that their working relationship had not been cordial and they had not worked together since The Story of Vernon and Irene Castle (1939). Regardless, Rogers accepted the role.

Filming on The Barkleys of Broadway began on August 8, 1948 and wrapped on October 30, with some additional work on December 28. During production, Astaire won an Honorary Academy Award for "his unique artistry and his contributions to the technique of musical pictures," presented to him at the awards ceremony by Ginger Rogers.

== Songs ==
- "Swing Trot" – music by Harry Warren and lyrics by Ira Gershwin. Dance critic Arlene Croce called this the best number in the film. Seen through the opening credits, it was released without visual impediment on That's Entertainment III (1994).
- "Sabre Dance" – by Aram Khachaturian, arranged for piano and orchestra, with Oscar Levant at the piano
- "You'd Be Hard to Replace" – by Harry Warren and Ira Gershwin
- "Bouncin' the Blues" – by Harry Warren
- "My One and Only Highland Fling" – by Harry Warren and Ira Gershwin
- "Weekend in the Country" – by Harry Warren and Ira Gershwin. Performed by Astaire, Rogers and Oscar Levant.
- "Shoes with Wings On" – by Harry Warren and Ira Gershwin. Fred Astaire performs this number alone, as part of the show that Josh Barkley does by himself. It utilized compositing to have Astaire, a cobbler, dance with many pairs of shoes.
- Piano Concerto No. 1 (Tchaikovsky) (abridged) – Performed by Oscar Levant with full symphony orchestra.
- "They Can't Take That Away From Me" – by George Gershwin (music) and Ira Gershwin (lyrics). This song was also used in RKO's 1937 Astaire-Rogers film Shall We Dance, where Astaire had sung it to Rogers (as here). Their dance duet here (ballroom – no tap), one of their most effective, was the first time they danced it together.
- "Manhattan Downbeat" – by Harry Warren and Ira Gershwin

Three unused songs composed by Warren and Gershwin that were intended for the film included "The Courtin' of Elmer and Ella," "Natchez on the Mississippi," and "The Poetry of Motion." Another song titled "There is No Music" was dropped from the film when Judy Garland was dropped from the principal cast.

== Release ==
The Barkleys of Broadway opened on May 4, 1949 at Loew's State Theatre in New York City.

== Reception ==
=== Critical reaction ===
Bosley Crowther of The New York Times praised the film, writing, "Charles Walters' fluid direction matches the talents of his stars, and the production, in fine Technicolor, is right out of Metro's top drawer. Let's hope that nations will be mellowed by this happy reunion of Ginger and Fred." Harrison's Reports called the film: "A highly entertaining musical comedy, lavishly produced and photographed in Technicolor. It is the sort of picture the fans can't help but enjoy, for the comedy is bright, the music delightful, and the dancing superb." Edwin Schallert of the Los Angeles Times described the film as "a kaleidoscope of diverting songs, dances and reasonably effective situations, agreeable and frequently amusing dialogue, and above all a certain bright sheen that might be covered by the word spontaneity, even though you know that the picture was probably all excellently diagrammed."

William Brogdon of Variety wrote the film is "an ace dance fest, presenting [Astaire and Rogers] at their terpsichorean best against a production background that is Metro at its lushest. However, Barkleys lacks the one popular ingredient that would have guaranteed socko business in any situation. The songs are ordinary." Similarly, Time magazine called The Barkleys of Broadway "a light-hearted Technicolored reunion for Hollywood's best-known dance team: Fred Astaire and Ginger Rogers." However, they felt it was also "missing (with one exception: They Can't Take That Away from Me) are the romantic Gershwin tunes which used to lift and carry their pictures along. Nevertheless, what is left makes much better entertainment than most cinemusicals."

=== Box office ===
The Barkleys of Broadway grossed $50,000 in its first week at the Loew's State Theatre. According to MGM records, the film earned $2,987,000 in theatrical rentals in the US and Canada and $1,434,000 overseas resulting in a profit of $324,000.

=== Accolades ===
Award	Category	Nominee(s)	Result	Ref.
Academy Awards	Best Cinematography (Color)	Harry Stradling	Nominated	
Writers Guild of America Awards	Best Written Musical	Betty Comden and Adolph Green	Nominated	

== Adaptations ==
A radio version of the film was broadcast on January 1, 1951, as an episode of the Lux Radio Theater, with Ginger Rogers reprising the role of Dinah Barkley, and George Murphy playing her husband and partner Josh.

== Bibliography ==
- Clarke, Geralde (2000). Get Happy: The Life of Judy Garland. New York: Random House. ISBN 978-0-375-50378-8.
- Fordin, Hugh (1996) [1975]. M-G-M's Greatest Musicals: The Arthur Freed Unit. New York: Da Capo Press. ISBN 978-0-306-80730-5.
- Jablonski, Edward (1999). "What about Ira?". In Schneider, Wayne (ed.). The Gershwin Style: New Looks at the Music of George Gershwin. New York: Oxford University Press. ISBN 978-0-195-35815-5.
- Phillips, Brent (2014). Charles Walters: The Director Who Made Hollywood Dance. University Press of Kentucky. ISBN 978-0-8131-4723-9.
