= Life with Judy Garland: Me and My Shadows =

2001 biographical television miniseries

- Based on: Me and My Shadows: A Family Memoir by Lorna Luft
- Written by: Robert L. Freedman
- Directed by: Robert Allan Ackerman
- Starring: Judy Davis; Tammy Blanchard; Victor Garber; Hugh Laurie
- Narrated by: Cynthia Gibb
- Music by: William Ross
- Country of origin: United States
- Original language: English

Production
- Executive producers: Craig Zadan; Neil Meron; Lorna Luft; Robert Allan Ackerman; Kirk Ellis
- Producers: Robert L. Freedman; John Ryan
- Cinematography: James Chressanthis
- Editor: Dody Dorn
- Running time: 170 minutes
- Production companies: Alliance Atlantis; In-Motion; Storyline Entertainment

Original release
- Network: ABC
- Release: February 25 – February 26, 2001

Life with Judy Garland: Me and My Shadows is a 2001 American two-part biographical television miniseries based on the 1998 book Me and My Shadows: A Family Memoir written by Lorna Luft, the daughter of legendary singer-actress Judy Garland. The miniseries was directed by Robert Allan Ackerman and originally broadcast in two parts on ABC on February 25 and 26, 2001.

The miniseries is notable for its meticulous recreations of Garland's films and concerts, and verisimilitudinous impressions of her by Tammy Blanchard and Judy Davis. Her original recordings are used to dub Davis' singing.

== Overview ==
The miniseries, which chronicles Garland's life from her first public performance in 1924 until her death in 1969, is divided into two parts: the first part depicts her rise to fame in the 1930s, her descent into drugs, and her fall from grace in the 1950s. The second part begins with her marriage to Sid Luft, and proceeds to chronicle her successful return to movies with A Star Is Born, concert performances, her personal issues and her death at the age of 47.

== Plot ==
=== Part 1 ===
Christmas 1924: Two-year-old Frances Gumm performs in public for the first time, singing "Jingle Bells" in Grand Rapids, Minnesota. Her mother, Ethel, watches from the audience while her father, Frank, watches from backstage. Ethel is unhappy with her marriage because of Frank's romantic interest in men. To help herself cope, she moves her family to Hollywood with the hope that her daughters will break into the movie business.

1935: Frank takes Frances, now using her stage name of "Judy Garland," to the studios of Metro Goldwyn Mayer to audition. MGM chief Louis B. Mayer is not impressed with her rendition of "Zing! Went the Strings of My Heart', but when she sings a different song an impressed Mayer says, "Little girl. Big voice." Thirteen-year-old Judy (played by Tammy Blanchard) signs an MGM contract but, because of her age, they do not know what to do with her and keep giving her radio appearances. Tragedy strikes one night when she is told her father has been rushed to the hospital. She is also told that the doctors have put a radio beside his bed, so he will be listening. While her sisters, Suzy and Jimmie, are in tears over their ill father, Ethel shows no emotion at all. He dies the next day.

1938-1939: Judy's movie career is now blooming. Now sixteen, she finds herself in competition with MGM's new glamorous star, Lana Turner, who is everything she is not: tall, thin, and blond. Judy also becomes jealous as Lana steals everybody's, including Mickey Rooney's, attention on her birthday. MGM purchases the rights to L. Frank Baum's classic children's book, The Wonderful Wizard of Oz. Rumors spread that Shirley Temple might be playing Dorothy, but when 20th Century Fox refuses to lend her out to them, Judy is cast. She is prescribed some pills to help her sleep and to give her energy to work, and she is also forced to lose weight. She is then seen filming the "Yellow Brick Road" sequence with the Scarecrow, Tin Man, and Cowardly Lion. On the first take, they all close in and shut her out, prompting director Victor Fleming to yell, "You three dirty hams! Let that little girl in there!" The film turns out to be a huge success and she is catapulted to international stardom.

Early 1940s: Judy begins a romance with bandleader Artie Shaw, who has already been married twice. This causes much concern, especially for Ethel, who has now remarried. Judy continues to see him and is shocked when he elopes with Lana Turner, leaving her heartbroken and reluctant to return to the studio since she feels she has to compete with all the goddesses. While filming the "I Got Rhythm" sequence for Girl Crazy, she is continually being reprimanded by the director, the no-nonsense Busby Berkeley, over not putting enough energy into her performance. Eventually, she collapses on the set and is granted three weeks rest, despite the doctor's instruction that she needs six. Aged just nineteen, she marries composer David Rose, but the marriage lasts only nine months.

1944: Judy (now played by Judy Davis) meets Vincente Minnelli (Hugh Laurie), who is the director of her next film, Meet Me in St. Louis. She is then shown filming "The Trolley Song" sequence. She and Vincente marry in 1945. On their honeymoon, she tells him she plans to quit MGM when her contract expires and that she is pregnant. She then throws away a bottle of her pills and vows never to take them again.

1947: Now mother to Liza, Judy is forced to renew her contract with MGM. While filming The Pirate, she has a mental breakdown and Vincente finds out she's taking the pills again. The marriage spirals downward from there.

1950: Judy is suspended from MGM and from filming Annie Get Your Gun (she was replaced with Betty Hutton). She also tries to commit suicide by slashing her throat with a broken glass. She is fired by MGM and her marriage to Vincente falls apart due to his exhaustion at her mood swings. During this time, she meets Sid Luft (Victor Garber). He helps her with her show business comeback at the Palace Theatre on Broadway.

=== Part 2 ===
Early 50s: Judy marries Sid in 1952 and a few months later she gives birth to her second child, Lorna. In 1953, Ethel dies in a parking lot after suffering a heart attack. Initially, Judy does not react to the news, having been estranged from her for years, but while filming "The Man That Got Away" sequence for A Star Is Born, her first film since MGM fired her, she misses her mark, and starts crying in her dressing room, not exactly sure if she is upset over Ethel's death. She receives an Academy Award nomination for her performance. However, shortly after the film's initial release, Sid is enraged to see some of their best scenes (and important ones too) have been cut under orders from distributors who felt the film was too long, thus killing both the flow of the story as well as its box office potential. In 1955, a day before the 27th Academy Awards, Judy gives birth to her third child, Joey, but on the night she loses the award to Grace Kelly, much to the shock and disappointment of her friends, and much of the film world.

Late 1950s: Judy is now struggling with debts, her weight has ballooned, and at this stage, her marriage to Sid is starting to crumble.

Early 1960s: After overcoming a life-threatening illness and slimming down, Judy tours America, the high point being a concert at Carnegie Hall. As her marriage to Sid continues to collapse, she wins custody of their children.

Mid 1960s: Judy gets her own television series, but she is forced to go on the road again after it is cancelled, due to low ratings, for playing in the same time slot as "Bonanza" and for critics at the studio complaining about her touching the other guests on the show, which was a strict taboo at that time on the networks. Her tour of Australia starts off well, but her concert in Melbourne is a flop; she has trouble remembering the words to her songs, stumbles, and is heckled by the audience before being booed off stage. She later marries for a fourth time, this time to Mark Herron. This marriage lasts a mere five months as he turns out to be gay and is discovered in bed with a male pool cleaner, and she throws him out. Lorna begins to understand the connection between her mother's erratic behaviour and her medication. Judy reconciles with Sid, who books her at the Palace Theatre, this time with Lorna and Joey. He gives Lorna some instructions on how to take care of her mother. However, life with Judy (which included constantly—and secretly—moving from one place to another because of her inability to pay bills) and looking after her and Joey becomes too much for Lorna, who collapses from exhaustion. Fearing for his children's safety, Sid takes them to live with him in Los Angeles.

1969: Judy marries for a fifth and final time. Her new husband is Mickey Deans. They settle in London. Liza, Lorna, and Joey call her on her 47th birthday, and say they will come and spend the summer with her when school finishes in two weeks. Twelve days later, she dies from an accidental overdose of sleeping pills. A hysterical Lorna sobs in Sid's arms. The film ends with Judy performing "Get Happy".

== Cast ==
- Judy Davis as Judy Garland
  - Carley Alves as Judy (age 2)
  - Tammy Blanchard as Judy (age 12-21)
- Hugh Laurie as Vincente Minnelli
- Victor Garber as Sid Luft
- John Benjamin Hickey as Roger Edens
- Sonja Smits as Kay Thompson
- Alison Pill as young Lorna Luft
  - Amber Metcalfe as Lorna (age 6)
  - Mackenzie Weiner as Lorna (age 3)
  - Krista Sutton as Lorna (adult)
- Aidan Devine as Frank Gumm
- Marsha Mason as Ethel Gumm
- Lindy Booth as Lana Turner
- Al Waxman as Louis B. Mayer
- Dwayne Adams as Mickey Rooney
- Jayne Eastwood as Lottie
- Martin Randez as Mark Herron
- Hume Baugh as Mickey Deans
- Daniel Kash as Arthur Freed
- Stewart Bick as Artie Shaw
- Rosemary Dunsmore as Ida Koverman
- Cara Pifko as Jimmy Gumm (adult)
  - Josephine De Cosma as Jimmy Gumm (age 7)
- Zoe Heath as Suzy Gumm (adult)
  - Samantha Gerber as Suzy Gumm (age 9)
- Michael Rhoades as Busby Berkeley
- Gerry Salsberg as Charles Bickford
- Phillip MacKenzie as Victor Fleming
- Thea Gill as Lucille Bremer
- Noah Henne as The Scarecrow (Ray Bolger)
- James Kall as The Tin Man (Jack Haley)
- Michael B. King as The Lion (Bert Lahr)
- Harrison Kane as Joey Luft (age 7-10)
  - Alex House as Joey Luft (age 11-15)
  - Ellis Turner as Joey Luft (age 4) (uncredited)
- Brittany Payer as Liza Minnelli (age 1-2)
  - Arielle Di Iulio as Liza (age 6-8)
  - Sarah Moussadji as Liza (age 12-15)
  - Marie Ward as Liza (age 23)
- Rob Smith as David Begelman
- Christopher Marren as Freddie Fields
- Richard M. Davidson as Jack Warner
- Derek Keurvorst as George Cukor
- Aron Tager as George Jessel
- William Holden as Himself (archive footage)
- Grace Kelly as Herself - Academy Award Recipient (archive footage)
- Cynthia Gibb as Narrator (older Lorna)

== Production ==
Principal photography began from 31 July 2000 to 29 September 2000.

== Awards and honors ==
Year	Award	Category	Nominee(s)	Result	Ref.
2001	Artios Awards	Best Casting for Mini-Series	Mary V. Buck and Susan Edelman	Won	
2001	Online Film & Television Association Awards	Best Miniseries		Nominated	
2001	Online Film & Television Association Awards	Best Actress in a Motion Picture or Miniseries	Judy Davis	Won	
2001	Online Film & Television Association Awards	Best Supporting Actor in a Motion Picture or Miniseries	Victor Garber	Nominated	
2001	Online Film & Television Association Awards	Best Supporting Actress in a Motion Picture or Miniseries	Tammy Blanchard	Nominated	
2001	Online Film & Television Association Awards	Best Direction of a Motion Picture or Miniseries		Nominated	
2001	Online Film & Television Association Awards	Best Writing of a Motion Picture or Miniseries		Nominated	
2001	Online Film & Television Association Awards	Best Ensemble in a Motion Picture or Miniseries		Nominated	
2001	Online Film & Television Association Awards	Best Costume Design in a Motion Picture or Miniseries		Won	
2001	Online Film & Television Association Awards	Best Editing in a Motion Picture or Miniseries		Nominated	
2001	Online Film & Television Association Awards	Best Lighting in a Motion Picture or Miniseries		Nominated	
2001	Online Film & Television Association Awards	Best Makeup/Hairstyling in a Motion Picture or Miniseries		Nominated	
2001	Online Film & Television Association Awards	Best Music in a Motion Picture or Miniseries		Nominated	
2001	Online Film & Television Association Awards	Best New Theme Song in a Motion Picture or Miniseries		Nominated	
2001	Online Film & Television Association Awards	Best Production Design in a Motion Picture or Miniseries		Nominated	
2001	Primetime Emmy Awards	Outstanding Miniseries	Peter Alan Sussman, Ed Gernon, Craig Zadan, Neil Meron, Robert Allan Ackerman, Lorna Luft, Kirk Ellis, Philip von Alvensleben, John Ryan, and Robert L. Freedman	Nominated	
2001	Primetime Emmy Awards	Outstanding Lead Actress in a Miniseries or a Movie	Judy Davis	Won	
2001	Primetime Emmy Awards	Outstanding Supporting Actor in a Miniseries or a Movie	Victor Garber	Nominated	
2001	Primetime Emmy Awards	Outstanding Supporting Actress in a Miniseries or a Movie	Tammy Blanchard	Won	
2001	Primetime Emmy Awards	Outstanding Directing for a Miniseries or a Movie	Robert Allan Ackerman	Nominated	
2001	Primetime Emmy Awards	Outstanding Writing for a Miniseries or a Movie	Robert L. Freedman	Nominated	
2001	Primetime Emmy Awards	Outstanding Art Direction for a Miniseries or Movie	Dan Davis, Ian Hall, and Stephanie Ziemer (for "Part 1")	Nominated	
2001	Primetime Emmy Awards	Outstanding Casting for a Miniseries or Movie	Deirdre Bowen, Mary Buck, Susan Edelman, and Tina Gerussi	Nominated	
2001	Primetime Emmy Awards	Outstanding Cinematography for a Miniseries or Movie	James Chressanthis (for "Part 1")	Nominated	
2001	Primetime Emmy Awards	Outstanding Costumes for a Miniseries or Movie	Dona Granata, Ann Peiponen, and Brian Russman (for "Part 1")	Won	
2001	Primetime Emmy Awards	Outstanding Hairstyling for a Miniseries or Movie	Marie-Ange Ripka and Andrea Traunmueller	Won	
2001	Primetime Emmy Awards	Outstanding Makeup (Non-Prosthetic)	Debi Drennan, Kevin Haney, and Pamela Roth	Won	
2001	Primetime Emmy Awards	Outstanding Single-Camera Picture Editing for a Miniseries or Movie	Dody Dorn (for "Part 1")	Nominated	
2001	Television Critics Association Awards	Outstanding Achievement in Movies, Miniseries and Specials		Won	
2002	American Cinema Editors Awards	Best Edited Motion Picture for Commercial Television	Dody Dorn	Nominated	
2002	American Film Institute Awards	Actor of the Year – Female – TV Movie or Mini-Series	Tammy Blanchard	Nominated	
2002	American Film Institute Awards	Actor of the Year – Female – TV Movie or Mini-Series	Judy Davis	Won	
2002	Costume Designers Guild Awards	Excellence in Period/Fantasy for Television	Dona Granata	Won	
2002	Critics' Choice Awards	Best Picture Made for Television		Won	
2002	Critics' Choice Awards	Best Actress in a Picture Made for Television	Judy Davis	Won	
2002	Directors Guild of America Awards	Outstanding Directorial Achievement in Movies for Television or Miniseries	Robert Allan Ackerman	Nominated	
2002	Directors Guild of Canada Awards	Outstanding Achievement in Sound Editing	Brandon Walker, Angie Pajek, Janice Ierulli, Phong Tran, Grant Bone, Kathy Choi, and Garrett Kerr	Won	
2002	Golden Globe Awards	Best Miniseries or Motion Picture Made for Television		Nominated	
2002	Golden Globe Awards	Best Actress in a Miniseries or Motion Picture Made for Television	Judy Davis	Won	
2002	Golden Globe Awards	Best Supporting Actress in a Series, Miniseries or Motion Picture Made for Television	Tammy Blanchard	Nominated	
2002	Golden Reel Awards	Best Sound Editing in Television – Dialogue & ADR, Long Form	Brandon Walker, Janice Ierulli, Angie Pajek, and Phong Tran	Nominated	
2002	Golden Reel Awards	Best Sound Editing in Television – Music, Movies and Specials	Yuri Gorbachow and Jim Harrison	Nominated	
2002	Prism Awards	TV Movie, Miniseries or Dramatic Special		Won	
2002	Producers Guild of America Awards	David L. Wolper Award for Outstanding Producer of Long-Form Television		Nominated	
2002	Satellite Awards	Best Miniseries		Won	
2002	Satellite Awards	Best Actress in a Miniseries or a Motion Picture Made for Television	Judy Davis	Won	
2002	Satellite Awards	Best Actress in a Supporting Role in a Miniseries or a Motion Picture Made for Television	Tammy Blanchard	Nominated	
2002	Screen Actors Guild Awards	Outstanding Performance by a Female Actor in a Miniseries or Television Movie	Judy Davis	Won	
2002	Writers Guild of America Awards	Long Form – Adapted	Robert L. Freedman; Based on the memoir Me and My Shadows: A Family Memoir by Lorna Luft	Nominated	
2002	Young Artist Awards	Best Family Movie or Special (Network or Cable)		Nominated	

== DVD release ==
The miniseries was released on DVD in region 1 on January 22, 2002, and re-released on DVD on May 22, 2012.

It was released in Australia by Starz Home Entertainment as a full-length film in a "Limited Edition 3 Disc Gift Set" of region 4 DVDs together with Beyond the Sea and The Buddy Holly Story.
