= Get Happy: The Life of Judy Garland =

2000 biography by Gerald Clarke

- Front cover of Get Happy; photo by Richard Avedon
- Author: Gerald Clarke
- Cover artist: Richard Avedon
- Language: English
- Genre: Biography
- Publisher: Random House
- Publication date: March 2000
- Publication place: USA
- Pages: 510
- ISBN: 0-375-50378-1
- Dewey Decimal: 782.42164/092 B 21
- LC Class: ML420.G253 C58 2000
- Preceded by: Capote

Get Happy: The Life of Judy Garland is a biography of entertainer Judy Garland. Published in 2000, Get Happy is author Gerald Clarke's follow-up to his 1988 biography of Truman Capote. Clarke conducted some 500 interviews, including some with subjects who had not previously spoken about Garland, and also drew upon tape recordings that Garland had made in the 1960s for an autobiography. He found Garland's unpublished 68-page manuscript in the Random House archives. Clarke spent ten years on the book, and only made his final decision to write about Garland after reading the extant biographies. "I did not want to write a book about her if the definitive book had already been written....So, I sat down and I read the biographies that had already been written and came up with no real impression of Judy....There was a disconnect between the woman who emerged from the pages and the woman I saw in the movies and heard on the records....I knew that the book had not yet been written."

== Critical response ==
Janet Maslin of The New York Times questions the need for another Garland biography at all, given the number of biographies already available, but cited the previously unavailable autobiographical materials as providing some justification. Disputing other reviewers' comments about pathography, Maslin describes Get Happy as placing Garland "on the kind of pedestal that comes complete with pigeon droppings". She deplores the tone of some of the anecdotes Clarke relates and questions his sourcing, noting that some of the worst anecdotes come from anonymous sources. Clarke, she concludes, " winds up wavering awkwardly between the tut-tut outing of Garland's secrets and the clammy hyperbole of the reverential fan".

Garland's daughter Lorna Luft, who wrote her own Garland biography, criticized Clarke's book. "I didn't like that one at all. If you're going to write a biography of somebody, it'd be nice if you'd talk to their family. The man never picked up a phone and talked to me. Then he had the nerve, when I said certain things weren't right in it, to say I wouldn't know. He never spoke to me." Clarke claimed that none of Garland's children cooperated with him.

== Possible stage and screen adaptations ==
On March 24, 2009, Harvey Weinstein optioned Get Happy and announced plans to produce a stage show and film based on it starring Anne Hathaway, with filming to begin summer of 2014. However, following Harvey Weinstein's sexual abuse allegations in October 2017, the fate of these projects is unknown.

== See also ==
- List of Judy Garland biographies
