= Me and My Shadows: A Family Memoir =

1998 autobiographical work by Lorna Luft

- First edition
- Author: Lorna Luft
- Language: English
- Genre: Autobiography
- Publisher: Simon & Schuster
- Publication date: April 24, 1998
- Publication place: United States
- Media type: Print (Hardcover)
- Pages: 432
- ISBN: 978-0-6710190-0-6
- OCLC: 44273369
- Dewey Decimal: 782.42/164/092/2
- LC Class: 98-190061

Me and My Shadows: A Family Memoir is a 1998 memoir written by Lorna Luft, the daughter of singer-actress Judy Garland.

== Overview ==
The book, which recounts her mother's life, Luft's life with Garland and dealing with life after her mother's death, was a New York Times best seller and published by Simon & Schuster.

== Adaptation ==
The book was adapted into an Emmy Award-winning ABC miniseries, Life with Judy Garland: Me and My Shadows, which aired February 25 and 26, 2001 and later released on DVD. It starred Tammy Blanchard as the teenage Judy and Judy Davis as the adult Judy.
