= Gerald Clarke (author) =

American writer

- Born: June 21, 1937 (age 88); Los Angeles, California, U.S.
- Education: Yale University
- Occupation: Author
- Employer(s): Time; Architectural Digest; Esquire
- Known for: Capote (2005); Get Happy: The Life of Judy Garland (2000); Capote (1988)

Gerald Clarke (born June 21, 1937) is an American writer, best known for the biographies Capote (1988) (made into the Oscar-winning 2005 film Capote) and Get Happy: The Life of Judy Garland (2000).

He has also written for magazines including Esquire, Architectural Digest, and Time, where he was a senior writer for many years.

While an undergraduate at Yale, he wrote for campus humor magazine The Yale Record.

A native of Los Angeles, Clarke now lives in Bridgehampton, in eastern Long Island, New York.
