= Meet Me in St. Louis (album) =

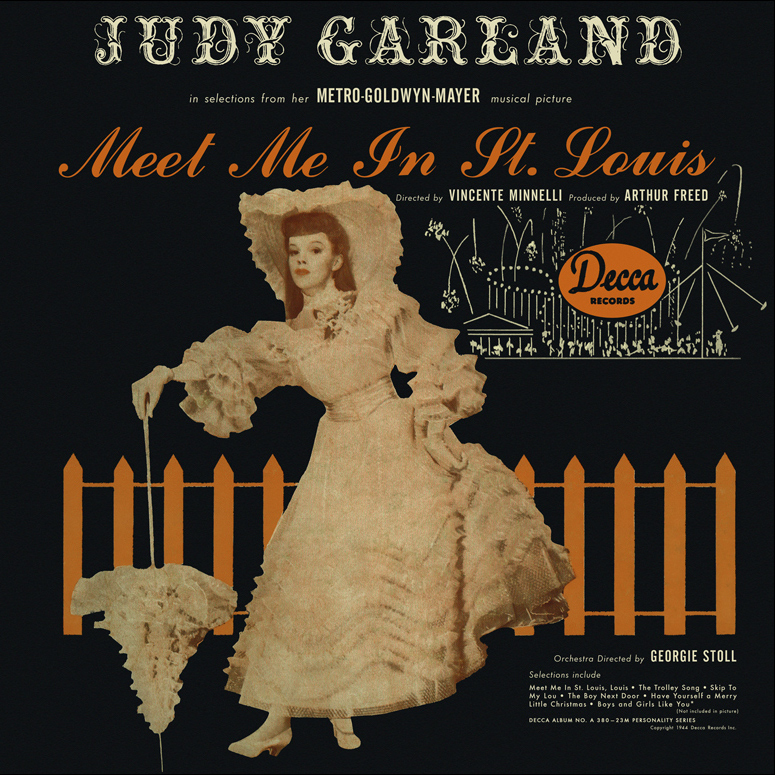
- Main album cover

Studio album by Judy Garland
- Released: November 2, 1944
- Recorded: April 20–21, 1944
- Studio: Decca Studios, Los Angeles, CA
- Genre: Traditional pop
- Label: Decca

Judy Garland chronology
Girl Crazy (1944)	Meet Me in St. Louis (1944)	The Harvey Girls (1945)

Alternative cover
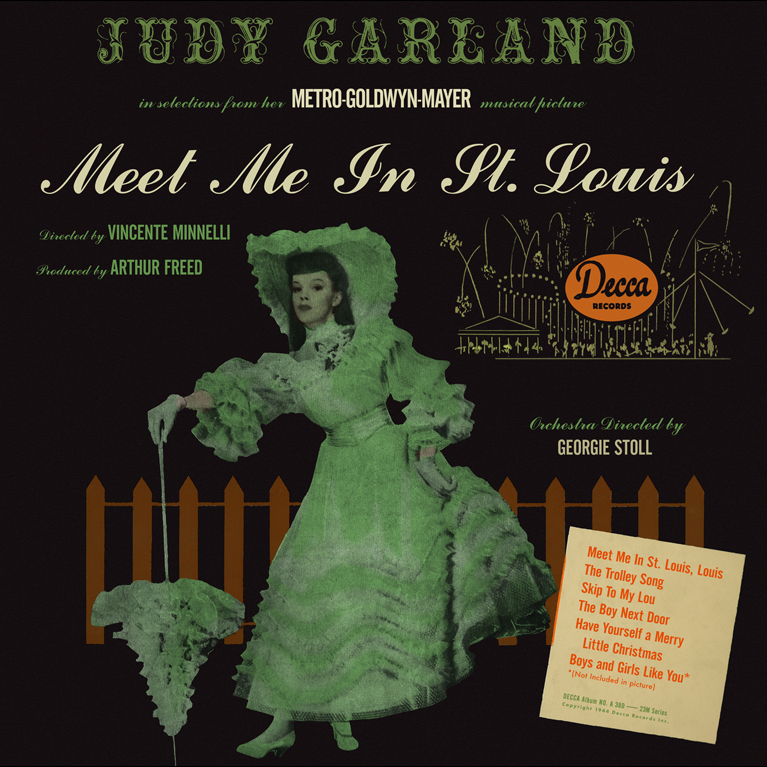
- Alternate cover

Professional ratings
Review scores
Source	Rating
Music Week	1/4 stars

Meet Me In St. Louis is the third studio album by the American actress and singer Judy Garland. It was released on November 2, 1944, by Decca Records. Orchestrated with Georgie Stoll's Orchestra, the album consists of songs from the Metro-Goldwyn-Mayer eponymous motion picture. A phonograph record, the recording was made specially for Decca, which Garland was under contract to.

== Reception ==
Released less than 10 days before Columbia and Victor Records formally ended the 1942-44 recording ban, the album peaked at number two on the April 7, 1945 Billboard Best-Selling Popular Record Albums chart. In their Record Possibilities column, the magazine praised "The Trolley Song":

... There's plenty of bounce and the platter is actually given movie treatment, with everything on wax but the kitchen sink... You have to play this three times to take in everything... Even if you have another version get this, too.

"The Trolley Song" was nominated for the Academy Award for Best Original Song at the 15th Academy Awards, but lost to "Swinging on a Star" by Bing Crosby from Paramount's Going My Way. Additionally, the album was the debut of "Have Yourself a Merry Little Christmas", now a perennial holiday standard.

== Track listing ==
With all selections featuring Georgie Stoll's Orchestra and Chorus, these newly issued songs were featured on a 3-disc, 78 rpm album set, Decca A-380.

Disc 1: (23360)

1. "Meet Me in St. Louis, Louis", recorded April 21, 1944.
2. "Skip to My Lou", recorded April 21, 1944.

Disc 2: (23361)

3. "The Trolley Song", recorded April 21, 1944.
4. "Boys and Girls Like You", recorded April 20, 1944.

Disc 3: (23662)

5. "Have Yourself a Merry Little Christmas", recorded April 20, 1944.
6. "The Boy Next Door", recorded April 20, 1944.
