= The Harvey Girls (album) =

Studio album by the cast of The Harvey Girls
- Released: November 1, 1945
- Label: Decca

The cast of The Harvey Girls chronology
Meet Me in St. Louis (1944)	The Harvey Girls (1945)	Till the Clouds Roll By (1947)

The Harvey Girls is a studio album by the cast of The Harvey Girls (1946), consisting of songs from the Metro-Goldwyn-Mayer eponymous motion picture. It was released on November 1, 1945, by Decca Records. The songs are composed by Harry Warren and Johnny Mercer.

The recording was made specially for Decca, which Garland was under contract to. It contains six tracks, including the popular "On the Atchison, Topeka and the Santa Fe" and "In the Valley, Swing Your Partner Round and Round". The album also features songs performed by Kenny Baker and Virginia O'Brien, as well as the Kay Thompson choir.

At the time of the record sessions of the album Thompson's husband, Jack Jenney, was unemployed at the time and urgently seeking work. He was hired by Lennie Hayton, with Thompson's assistance, to play trombone on Garland's recording.

In his review for the album in Billboard magazine, Maurie Orodenker seems to be disappointed particularly with Garland's performance. He finds that her rendition of "On the Atchison, Topeka and the Santa Fe" is "forced" and that the song doesn't have the same impact as the original version. He also finds that Garland's performance in other songs is "dead-pan" and doesn't convey personality. However, he liked Kenny Baker's performance in "Wait and See" and considers the song a highlight of the record.

In 1957, Decca released a compilation album including a selection of songs from both The Harvey Girls and Meet Me in St. Louis that received a favorable review from Billboard magazine (82/100). In 1995, Rhino Records released a 4-CD box set entitled Mickey & Judy which includes songs from The Harvey Girls and others songs that Garland and Rooney recorded for their Metro-Goldwyn-Mayer (MGM) films.

== Track listing ==
Disc 1
No.	Title	Length
1.	"On the Atchison, Topeka and the Santa Fe"
2.	"In the Valley"

Disc 2
No.	Title	Length
1.	"Wait and See"
2.	"Swing Your Partner Round and Round"

Disc 3
No.	Title	Length
1.	"It's a Great Big World"
2.	"The Wild, Wild West"
