= Girl Crazy (album) =

Studio album by Judy Garland and Mickey Rooney
- Released: April 6, 1944
- Label: Decca

Judy Garland and Mickey Rooney chronology
Judy Garland Second Souvenir Album (1943)	Girl Crazy (1944)	Meet Me in St. Louis (1944)

Girl Crazy is a studio album by the American actress and singer Judy Garland and American actor Mickey Rooney, it was Judy’s debut studio album, It was released on April 6, 1944, by Decca Records. The album consists of songs from the Metro-Goldwyn-Mayer eponymous motion picture. Garland's recording sessions for the album took place during November 1943. The recording was made specially for Decca, which Garland was under contract to.

The album features Garland on vocals for most of the tracks, including "Embraceable You", "But Not for Me", "Bidin' My Time", and "I Got Rhythm". Rooney also contributes vocals to two tracks, "Could You Use Me?" and "Treat Me Rough". The album's orchestral accompaniment was conducted by Georgie Stoll, with additional harmonica accompaniment by Leo Diamond's Harmonica Quintet on "Bidin' My Time".

== Critical reception ==
Professional ratings
Review scores
Source	Rating
Billboard	negative
The New Records	positive
The Nation	no rating

In his review for Billboard magazine, Maurie Orodenker noted that the album lacked the warmth and cohesion of the stage version, with songs selected randomly. He observed that while Garland performed most of the tracks, the album didn't capture her live energy. Orodenker also remarked that Rooney's singing was merely tolerable, affirming that his contribution to the album’s appeal stemmed more from his popularity and public recognition than from his vocal abilities.

Conversely, The New Records magazine gave the album a very positive review, writing: "All of the tunes are catchy and the lyrics are irresistible. Mr. Rooney and Miss Garland put them across in good style with the aid of a chorus, good orchestra, and the Leo Diamond Harmonic Quintet. If you liked the movie you'll like this album; it contains a lot of pleasing music considerably above the average. It has been well recorded and the record surfaces are smooth."

== Track listing ==
Disc 1
No.	Title	Length
1.	"Embraceable You"	3:11
2.	"Could You Use Me?"	3:00

Disc 2
No.	Title	Length
1.	"But Not For Me"	3:05
2.	"Treat Me Rough"	3:00

Disc 3
No.	Title	Length
1.	"Bidin' My Time"	3:04
2.	"I Got Rhythm"	2:50

== 1995 box set ==
In 1995, Rhino Records released a 4-CD box set entitled Mickey & Judy which includes songs from Girl Crazy and other songs that Garland and Rooney recorded for their Metro-Goldwyn-Mayer (MGM) films.
