= Judy Garland =

American actress and singer (1922–1969)

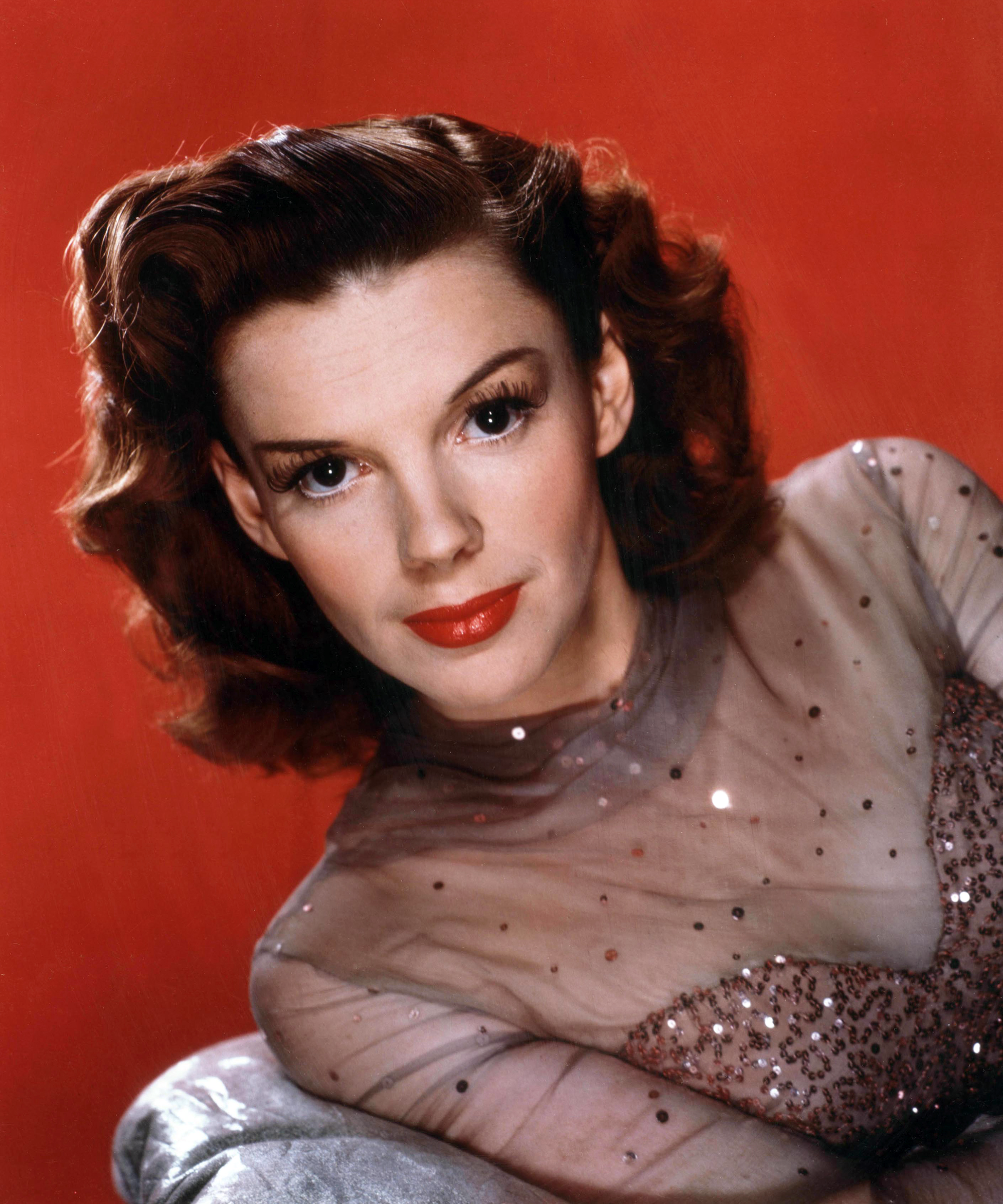
- Garland in a 1945 publicity photo for The Harvey Girls (1946)
- Born: Frances Ethel Gumm; June 10, 1922; Grand Rapids, Minnesota, U.S.
- Died: June 22, 1969 (aged 47); Belgravia, London, England
- Occupations: Actress; singer; vaudevillian
- Years active: 1924–1969
- Works: Filmography; discography
- Height: 4 ft 11.5 in (151 cm)
- Spouses: David Rose (m. 1941; div. 1944); Vincente Minnelli (m. 1945; div. 1951); Sidney Luft (m. 1952; div. 1965); Mark Herron (m. 1965; div. 1969); Mickey Deans (m. 1969)
- Children: 3, including Liza and Lorna
- Parents: Francis Avent Gumm; Ethel Marion Milne
- Awards: Full list
- Musical career
- Genres: Traditional pop; jazz; swing; vaudeville
- Instruments: Vocals; piano
- Website: judygarland.com

Judy Garland (born Frances Ethel Gumm; June 10, 1922 – June 22, 1969) was an American actress, singer, and vaudevillian whose career spanned four decades. She is known for her artistic range and strong contralto voice, working in a variety of genres including musicals, comedies, and dramas. Her career and personal life, marked by both public fascination and private struggle, made her a cultural icon.

Garland began her career at the age of two, performing with her two older sisters as a vaudeville act called The Gumm Sisters. In 1935, aged 13, she signed a contract with Metro-Goldwyn-Mayer (MGM) and was initially cast in supporting roles in ensemble musicals such as Broadway Melody of 1938 (1937) and Thoroughbreds Don't Cry (1937). She achieved international recognition for her portrayal of Dorothy Gale in the musical film The Wizard of Oz (1939). She followed this with leading roles in MGM musicals including Meet Me in St. Louis (1944), Easter Parade (1948), and Summer Stock (1950). She expanded her range with dramatic performances in A Star Is Born (1954) and Judgment at Nuremberg (1961), both of which earned her Academy Award nominations.

Garland's music career was kickstarted with her signature song "Over the Rainbow" from The Wizard of Oz. She recorded 11 studio albums between 1939 and 1962. Her albums Meet Me in St. Louis (1944) and Miss Show Business (1955) peaked in the top ten of the U.S. Billboard 200, while Judy (1956), Alone (1957), and The Garland Touch (1962) reached the top 40. Her live album, Judy at Carnegie Hall (1961), made Garland the first woman to win the Grammy Award for Album of the Year. Also in 1961, she became the first female recipient and youngest honoree of the Golden Globe Cecil B. DeMille Award. Garland developed dependencies on prescription medications that affected her physical and mental well-being. She died from an accidental barbiturate overdose at age 47 in 1969.

Several of Garland's performances are preserved in the National Film Registry and the National Recording Registry by the Library of Congress, and six of her recordings have been inducted into the Grammy Hall of Fame. Her numerous accolades include one Golden Globe Award, two Grammy Awards, the Academy Juvenile Award, the Special Tony Award, and nominations for three Emmy Awards. In 1997, she was posthumously awarded the Grammy Lifetime Achievement Award. In 1999, the American Film Institute ranked her the eighth-greatest star of classic Hollywood cinema.

== Early life ==
Garland was born Frances Ethel Gumm on June 10, 1922, in Grand Rapids, Minnesota. She was the youngest child of vaudevillians Ethel Marion Milne (1896–1953) and Francis Avent Gumm (1886–1935). She was named after both of her parents and baptized at a local Episcopal church. Her parents had met and married in Wisconsin and then settled in Grand Rapids, where they operated a movie theater showcasing vaudeville acts. She was of Irish, English, Scottish, and Huguenot ancestry.

"Baby" (as she was called by her parents and sisters) shared her family's flair for song and dance. Her first appearance came at the age of two, when she joined her elder sisters Mary Jane "Suzy/Suzanne" Gumm (1915–1964) and Dorothy Virginia "Jimmie" Gumm (1917–1977) on the stage of her father's movie theater during a Christmas show to sing a chorus of "Jingle Bells". The Gumm Sisters performed there for the next few years, accompanied by their mother on piano.

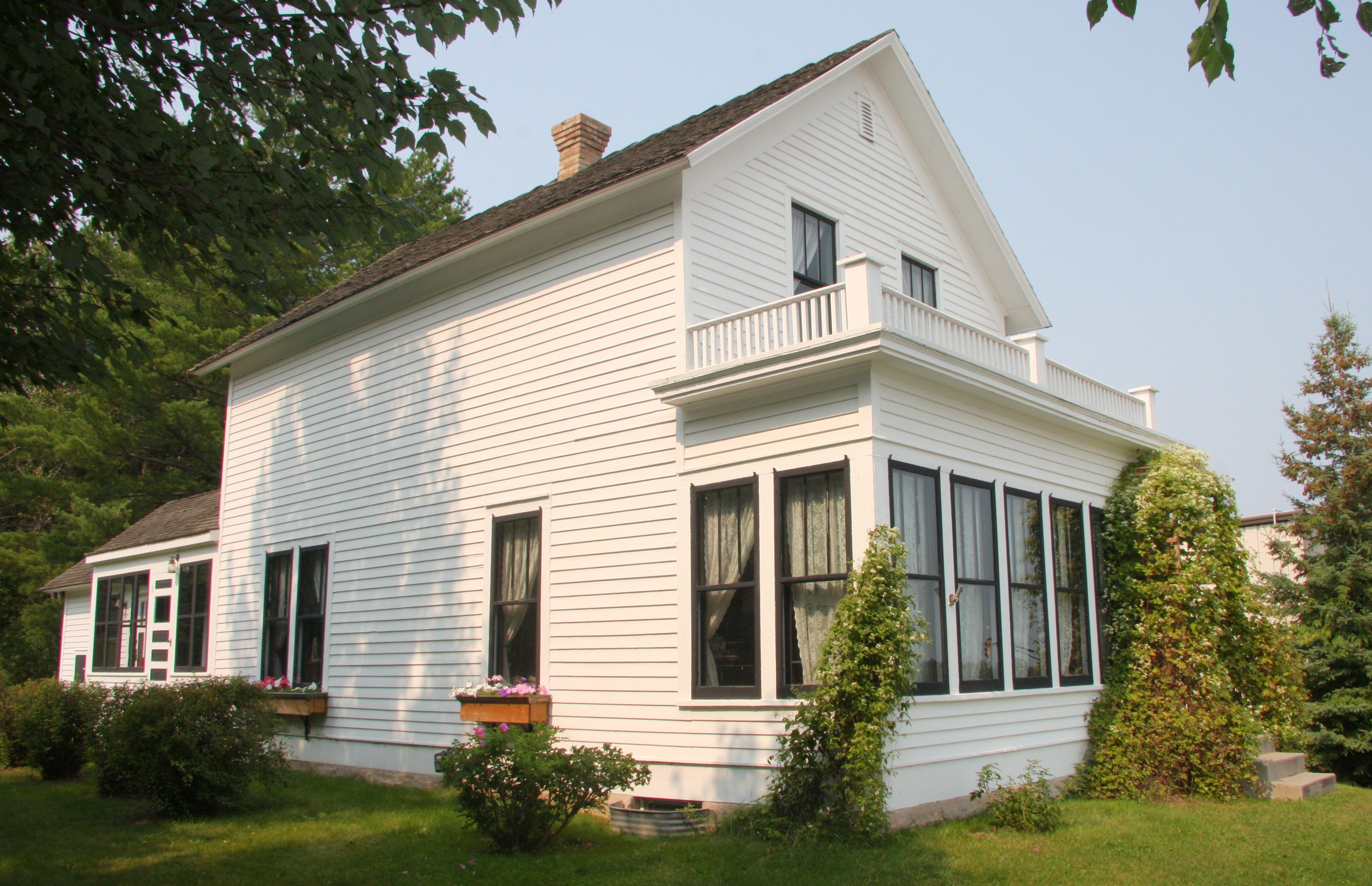
Garland's birthplace in Grand Rapids, Minnesota, is now a museum dedicated to her life and career.

Following rumors that Francis Gumm had homosexual inclinations, the family relocated to Lancaster, California in June 1926. Francis Gumm bought and operated another theater in Lancaster.

== Career ==
=== 1928–1935: The Gumm/Garland Sisters ===
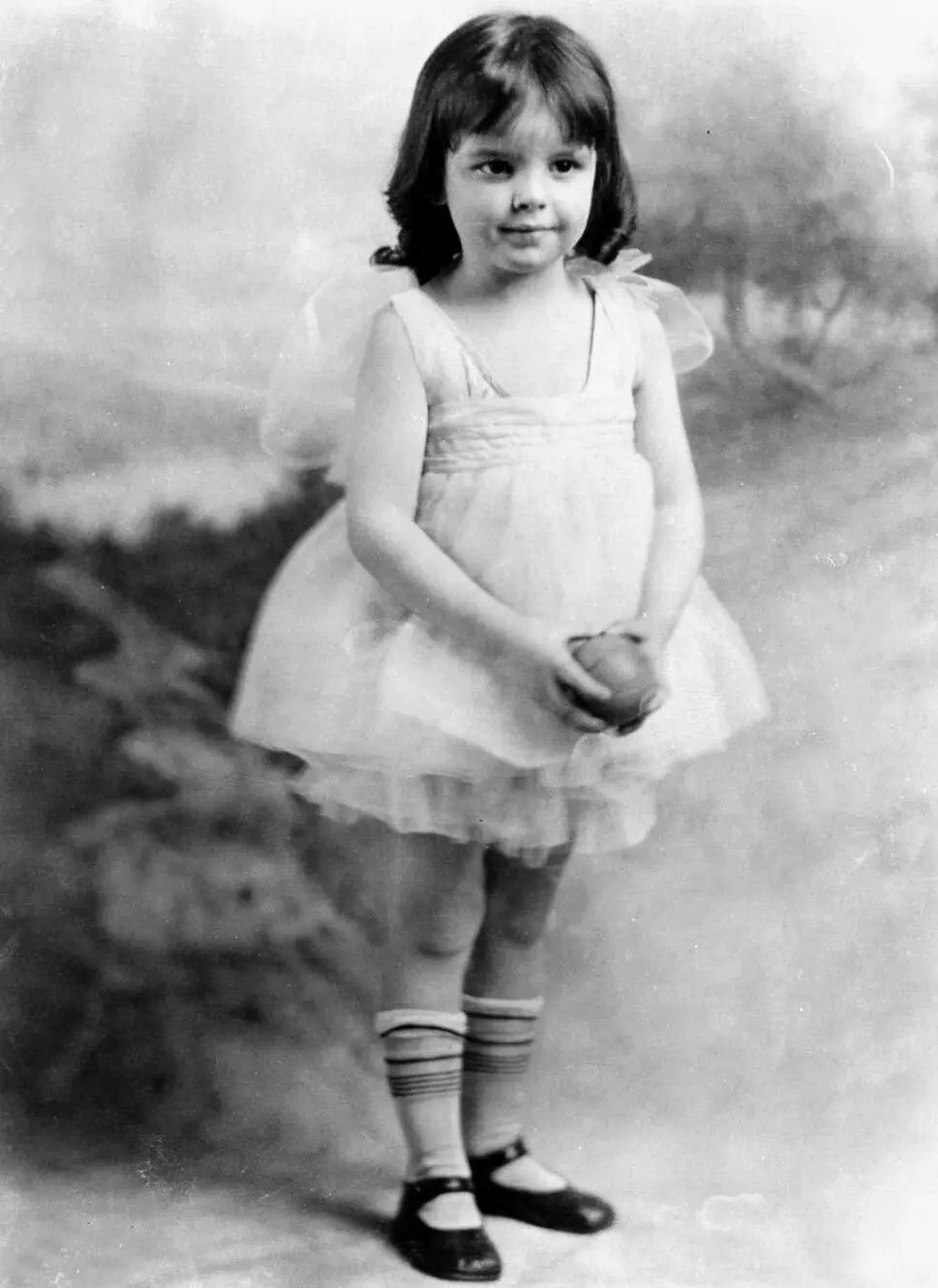
Garland in a costume for her debut performance

In 1928 the Gumm Sisters enrolled in a dance school run by Ethel Meglin, proprietor of the Meglin Kiddies dance troupe, and appeared with the troupe at its annual Christmas show. Through the Meglin Kiddies, the sisters made their film debut in a short subject called The Big Revue (1929), in which they performed a song-and-dance number called "That's the Good Old Sunny South". This was followed by appearances in two Vitaphone shorts the following year: A Holiday in Storyland, featuring Garland's first on-screen solo, and The Wedding of Jack and Jill. They next appeared together in Bubbles (1930). Their final on-screen appearance was in an MGM Technicolor short entitled La Fiesta de Santa Barbara (1935).

The trio had toured the vaudeville circuit as "The Gumm Sisters" for many years by the time they performed in Chicago at the Oriental Theater with George Jessel in 1934. He encouraged the group to choose a more appealing name after "Gumm" was met with laughter from the audience. According to theater legend, their act was once erroneously billed at a Chicago theater as "The Glum Sisters".

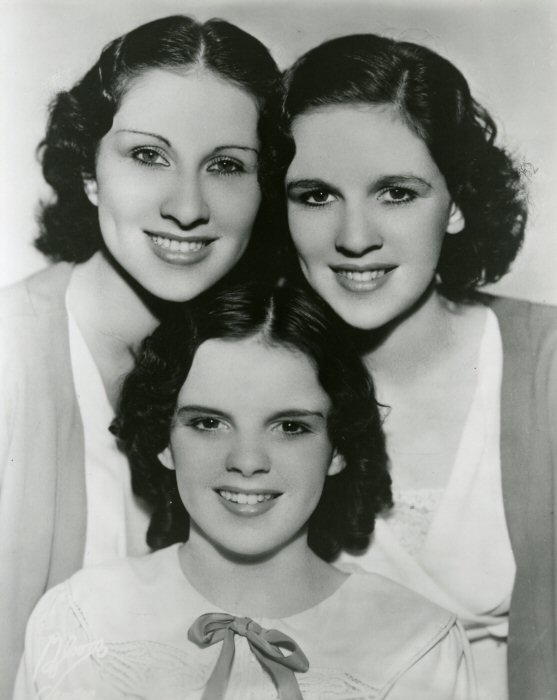
The Gumm Sisters, also known as the Garland Sisters, c. 1935: Top row: Mary Jane and Dorothy Virginia Gumm; bottom: Frances Ethel (Judy Garland) Gumm

Several stories persist regarding the origin of their use of the name Garland. One is that it was originated by Jessel after Carole Lombard's character Lily Garland in the film Twentieth Century (1934), which was then playing at the Oriental in Chicago; another is that the girls chose the surname after drama critic Robert Garland. Garland's daughter Lorna Luft stated that her mother selected the name when Jessel announced that the trio "looked prettier than a garland of flowers". On a TV special filmed in Hollywood at the Pantages Theatre premiere of A Star Is Born on September 29, 1954, Jessel stated:

I think that I ought to tell the folks that it was I who named Judy Garland, "Judy Garland." Not that it would have made any difference – you couldn't have hid[den] that great talent if you'd called her "Tel Aviv Windsor Shell", you know, but her name when I first met her was Frances Gumm and it wasn't the kind of a name that so sensitive a great actress like that should have; ... and so we called her Judy Garland and I think she's a combination of Helen Hayes and Al Jolson and maybe Jenny Lind and Sarah Bernhardt.

A later explanation surfaced when Jessel was a guest on Garland's television show in 1963. He said that he had sent actress Judith Anderson a telegram containing the word "garland" and it stuck in his mind.

By late 1934 the Gumm Sisters had changed their name to the Garland Sisters. Soon afterward, Frances changed her name to "Judy," inspired by a popular Hoagy Carmichael song. The group broke up by August 1935, when Mary Jane "Suzanne" Garland flew to Reno, Nevada, and married musician Lee Kahn, a member of the Jimmy Davis orchestra playing at Cal-Neva Lodge, Lake Tahoe.

=== 1935–1938: Early years at Metro-Goldwyn-Mayer ===
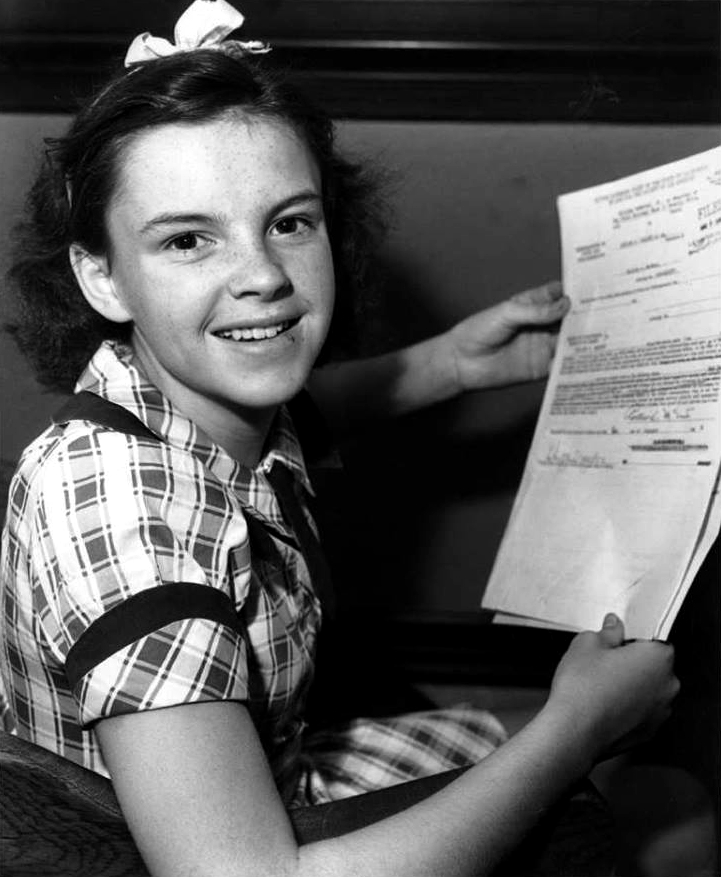
Garland in 1935

In September 1935 Louis B. Mayer asked songwriter Burton Lane to go to the Orpheum Theater in downtown Los Angeles to watch the Garland Sisters' vaudeville act and to report back to him. A few days later, Garland and her father were brought for an impromptu audition at Metro-Goldwyn-Mayer Studios in Culver City. Garland performed "Zing! Went the Strings of My Heart" and "Eli, Eli," a Yiddish song written in 1896 and regularly performed in vaudeville. The studio immediately signed Garland to a contract with MGM, presumably without a screen test, though she had made a test for the studio several months earlier. The studio did not know what to do with her; aged 13, she was older than the traditional child star but too young for adult roles.

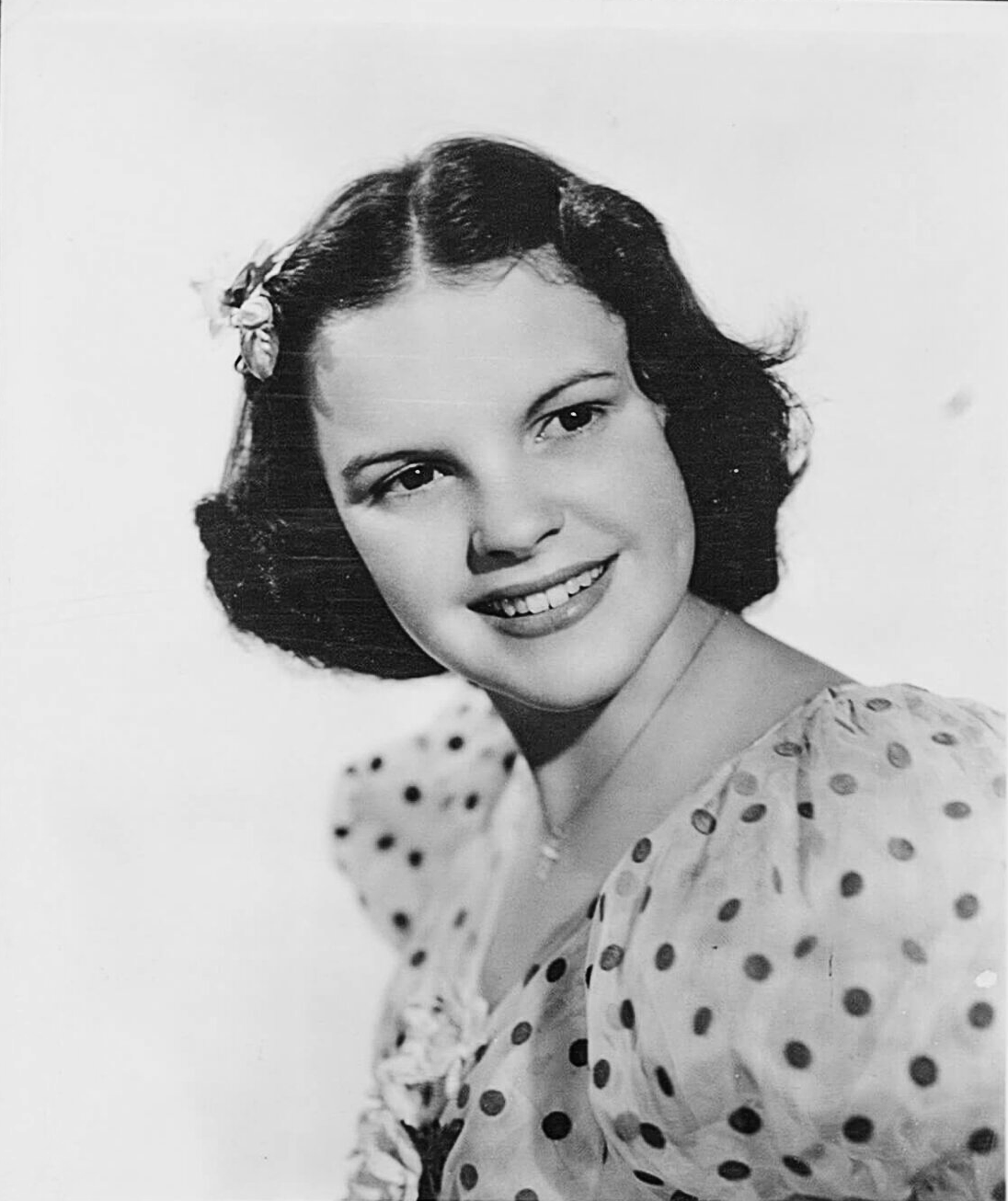
Garland in a publicity photo for Pigskin Parade (1936)

Her physical appearance was a dilemma for MGM. She was only 4 ft 11.5 in (151 cm) and her "cute" or "girl-next-door" looks did not match the glamorous persona then required of female leading performers. She was self-conscious and anxious about her appearance. Garland went to school at the studio with actresses such as Ava Gardner and Lana Turner—"real beauties," said Charles Walters, who directed her in a number of films. "Judy was the big money-maker at the time, a big success, but she was the ugly duckling ... I think it had a very damaging effect on her emotionally for a long time. I think it lasted forever, really." Her insecurity was exacerbated by the attitude of studio chief Mayer, who referred to her as his "little hunchback."

During her early years at MGM, she was photographed and dressed in plain clothing or frilly juvenile gowns and costumes to match the "girl-next-door" image created for her. She was also asked to wear removable caps on her teeth and rubberized discs to reshape her nose.

On November 16, 1935, the young teen Garland was in the midst of preparing for a radio performance on the Shell Chateau Hour when she learned that her father had been hospitalized with meningitis and that his medical condition had taken a turn for the worse. He died the following morning at age 49, leaving her devastated.

Garland's song for the Shell Chateau Hour was her first professional rendition of "Zing! Went the Strings of My Heart", a song that became a standard in many of her concerts. She performed at various studio functions and was eventually cast opposite Deanna Durbin in the musical short Every Sunday (1936). The film contrasted her vocal range and swing style with Durbin's operatic soprano and served as an extended screen test for them, as studio executives were questioning the wisdom of having two girl singers on the roster.

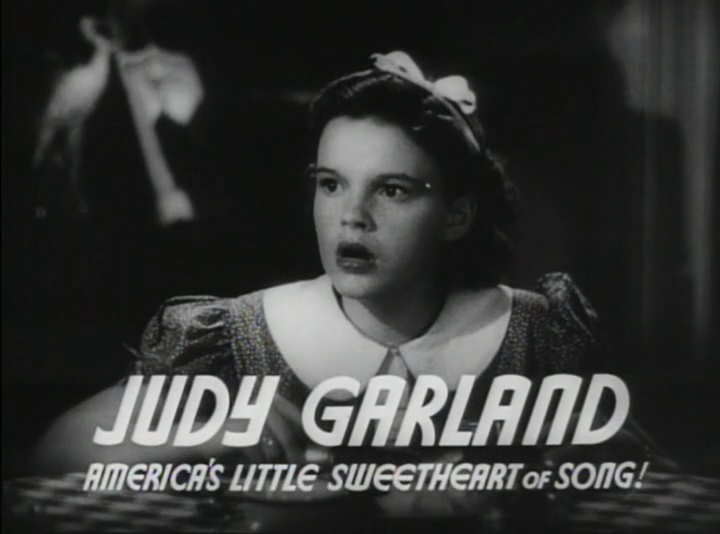
Garland in the Thoroughbreds Don't Cry trailer (1937)

Garland's first feature-length film was as a loan-out to Fox titled Pigskin Parade, a football-themed musical comedy where she was billed tenth after Stuart Erwin, Jack Haley, Patsy Kelly, Betty Grable, and others. Garland sang three solos, including "The Texas Tornado" and "The Balboa".

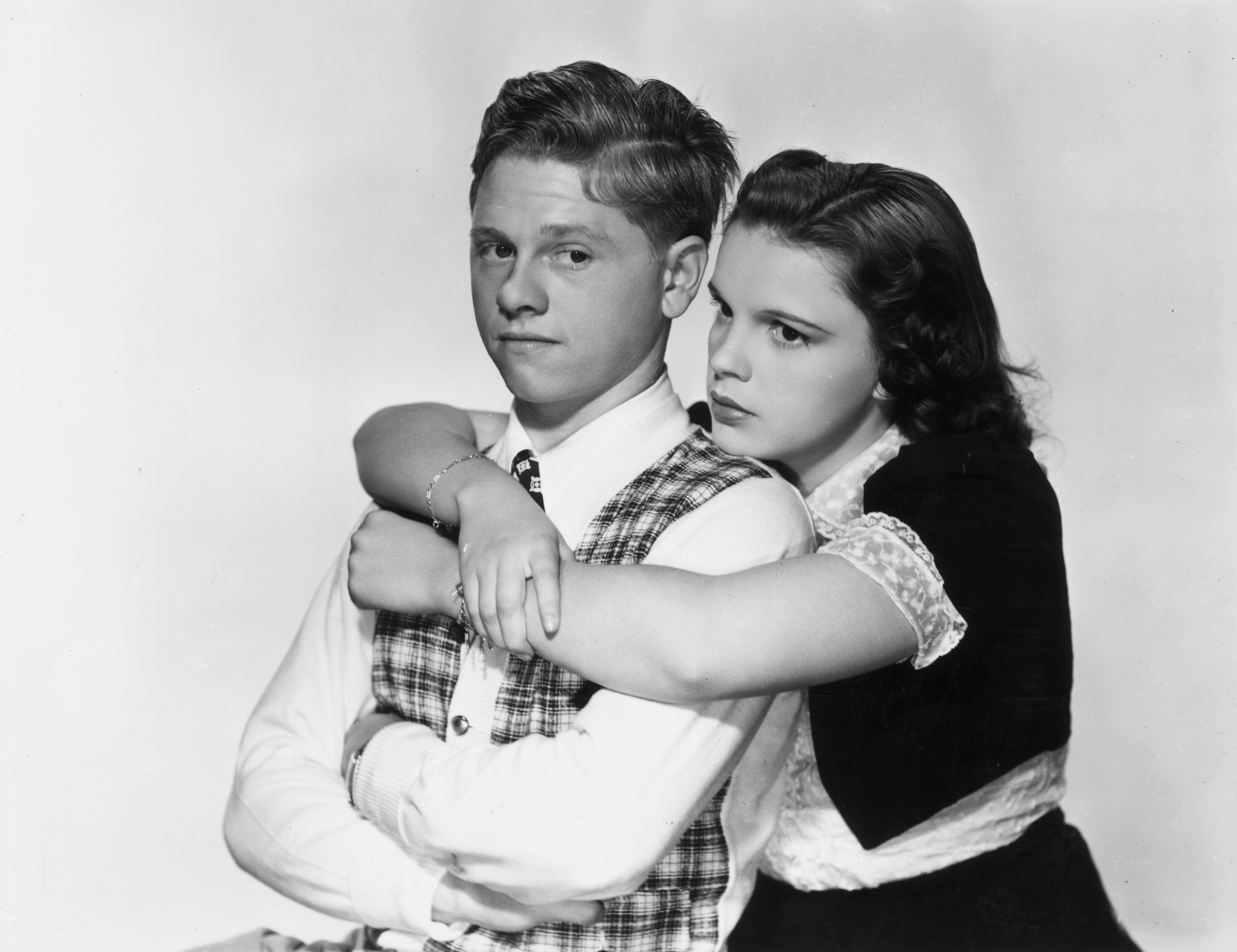
Garland and Mickey Rooney in a publicity photo for Love Finds Andy Hardy (1938)

Garland came to the attention of studio executives when she sang a special arrangement of "You Made Me Love You (I Didn't Want to Do It)" to Clark Gable at a birthday party that the studio arranged for the actor. Her rendition was so well regarded that she performed the song in the all-star extravaganza Broadway Melody of 1938 (1937), singing to a photograph of Gable.

MGM found a winning formula when it paired Garland with Mickey Rooney in a string of what were known as "backyard musicals". The duo first appeared together as supporting characters in the B movie Thoroughbreds Don't Cry (1937). Garland was then cast in the fourth in the series of the Hardy Family movies, Love Finds Andy Hardy (1938), as a girl next door to Rooney's character Andy Hardy, although Hardy's love interest in this film was played by Lana Turner. Rooney and Garland were cast as lead characters for the first time in Babes in Arms (1939), ultimately appearing together in five additional films, including the Hardy films Andy Hardy Meets Debutante (1940) and Life Begins for Andy Hardy (1941).

Garland stated that she, Rooney, and other young performers were constantly prescribed amphetamines to stay awake and keep up with the frantic pace of making one film after another. They were also given barbiturates to take before going to bed so they could sleep. This regular use of drugs, she said, led to addiction and a life-long struggle. She came to resent the hectic schedule and believed MGM stole her youth. Rooney, however, denied their studio was responsible for her addiction: "Judy Garland was never given any drugs by Metro-Goldwyn-Mayer. Mr. Mayer didn't sanction anything for Judy. No one on that lot was responsible for Judy Garland's death. Unfortunately, Judy chose that path."

Garland's weight was within a healthy range, but the studio demanded she constantly diet. The MGM commissary was instructed to serve her only a bowl of chicken soup and black coffee when she ordered a regular meal. Garland was plagued with self-doubt throughout her life. Despite successful film and recording careers, awards, critical praise, and ability to fill concert halls worldwide, she required constant reassurance that she was talented and attractive.

=== 1938–1939: The Wizard of Oz ===
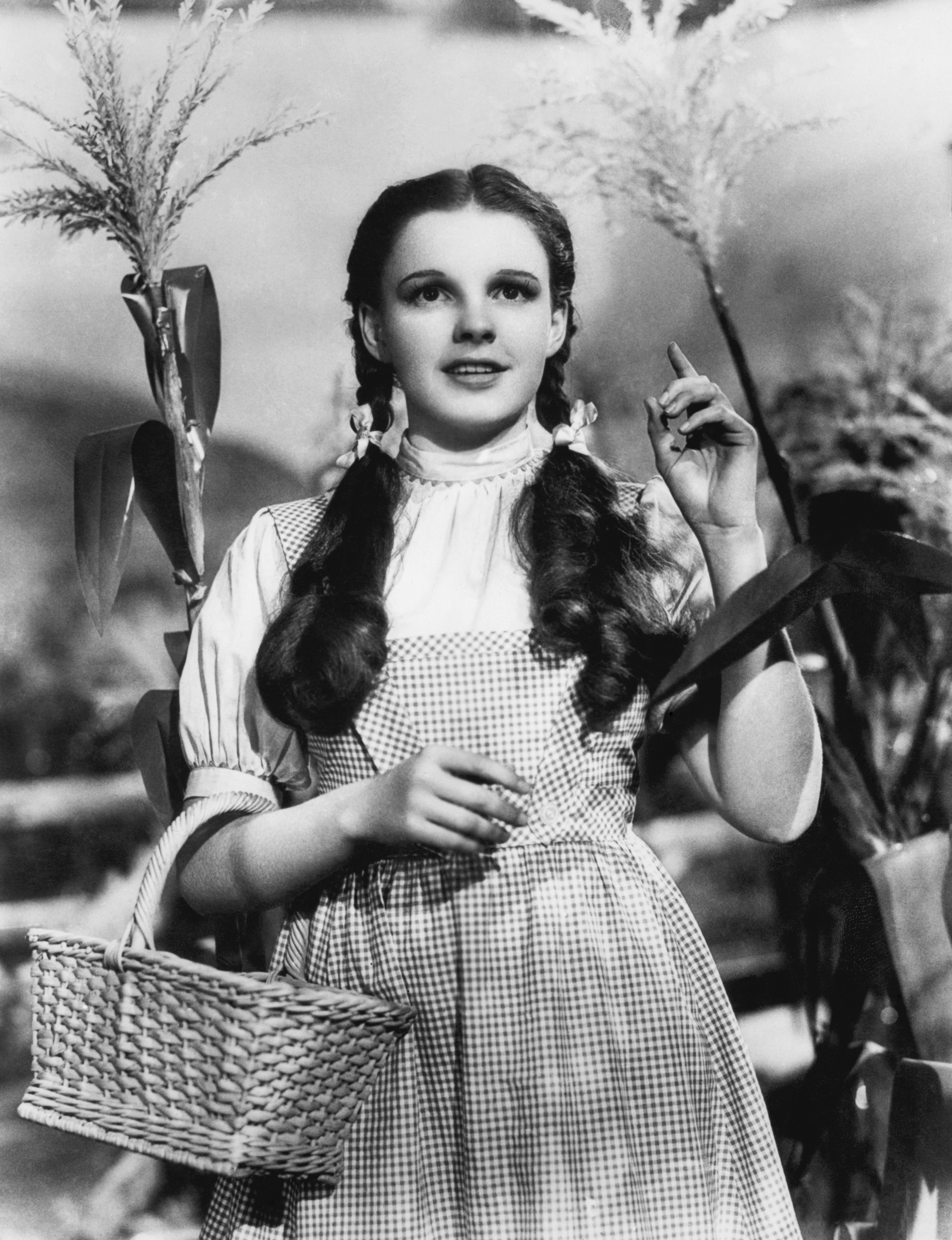
Garland in a publicity photo for The Wizard of Oz (1939)

In 1938, when Garland was sixteen, she was cast as Dorothy Gale in The Wizard of Oz (1939), a film based on the 1900 children's book by L. Frank Baum. In the film, she sang the song with which she would be constantly identified afterward, "Over the Rainbow". She frequently used an excerpt from it as her entrance music during later concerts and television appearances and named it her favorite of all the songs she had ever recorded, showing how "inextricably linked" it was to her career.

Garland was not the studio's first choice for the character of Dorothy. Although producers Arthur Freed and Mervyn LeRoy had wanted to cast her in the role from the outset, studio chief Mayer first tried to borrow Shirley Temple from 20th Century Fox but was declined. Deanna Durbin was then asked but was unavailable. Garland then received the role.

Garland was initially outfitted in a blonde wig for the part, but Freed and LeRoy decided against it shortly into filming. Her blue gingham dress was chosen for its blurring effect on her figure, which made her look younger. Shooting commenced on October 13, 1938, and was completed on March 16, 1939, at a final cost of more than $2 million (equivalent to $36 million in 2025). With the conclusion of filming, MGM kept Garland busy with publicity and the shooting of Babes in Arms (also in 1939), directed by Busby Berkeley. She and Rooney were sent on a cross-country promotional tour, culminating in the New York City premiere at the Capitol Theater on August 17, which included a five-show-a-day appearance schedule for the two stars.

Garland was reportedly put on a diet consisting of cigarettes, chicken soup, and coffee during filming in a further attempt to minimize her curves. However, historians Jay Scarfone and William Stillman have clarified that at the time Garland was an anti-smoker and was allowed solid food. In any event, her diet was accompanied by swimming and hiking outings, plus tennis and badminton matches with her stunt double Bobbie Koshay.

The Wizard of Oz was a tremendous critical success, though its high budget and estimated promotion costs of $4 million (equivalent to $73 million in 2025), coupled with the lower revenue that was generated by discounted children's tickets, meant that the film did not return a profit until it was re-released in the 1940s. At the 1939 Academy Awards ceremony, Garland received her only Academy Award, an Academy Juvenile Award for her performances in 1939, including The Wizard of Oz and Babes in Arms. She was the fourth recipient of the award as well as only one of 12 actors ever to be presented with one. After The Wizard of Oz, Garland was one of the most bankable actresses in the United States.

=== 1940–1946: Adult stardom ===
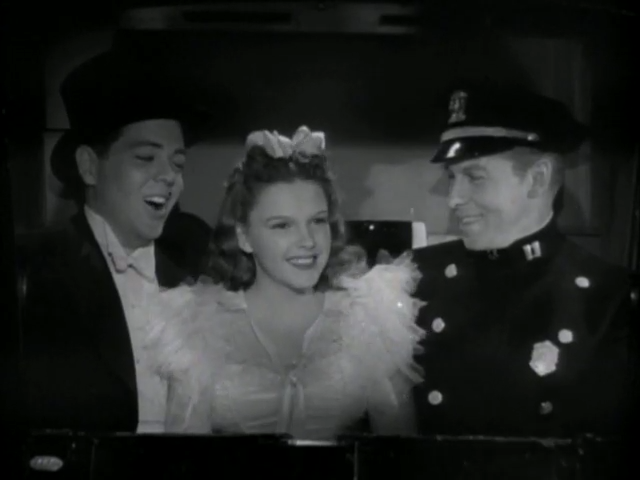
Garland as Nellie Kelly in Little Nellie Kelly (1940), which was her first adult role

Garland starred in three films released in 1940: Andy Hardy Meets Debutante, Strike Up the Band, and Little Nellie Kelly. In the last of these, she played her first adult role, a dual role of both mother and daughter. Little Nellie Kelly was purchased from George M. Cohan as a vehicle for her to display both her audience appeal and her physical appearance. The role was a challenge for her, requiring the use of an accent, her first adult kiss, and the only death scene of her career. Her co-star George Murphy regarded the kiss as embarrassing, commenting that it felt like being "a hillbilly with a child bride."

During that time, still a teenager, Garland experienced her first serious adult romance with bandleader Artie Shaw. She was deeply devoted to him and was devastated when he eloped with Lana Turner in early 1940. In the early 1940s, Garland began a relationship with musician David Rose, who was 12 years her senior. He proposed to her on her eighteenth birthday, despite being married to actress and singer Martha Raye. MGM disapproved of the relationship, so he and Garland agreed to wait a year to allow for his divorce to become final. During that time, Garland had a brief affair with songwriter Johnny Mercer. After her breakup with Mercer, Garland and Rose were wed on July 27, 1941, when she was only 19.

The media called the relationship "a true rarity." Garland and Rose moved into a house in Bel Air, Los Angeles, where Rose had room to build miniature trains in the back yard. Though their life together was initially enjoyable, MGM still disapproved of the relationship and allegedly tried to separate them, fearing—along with Garland's mother—that the relationship would ruin Garland's image. In 1941, while Garland was pregnant with Rose's child, she had an abortion at the insistence of her mother and studio executives. According to Woman's World, Rose was even hostile toward Garland. The couple agreed to a trial separation in January 1943 and were divorced in 1944.

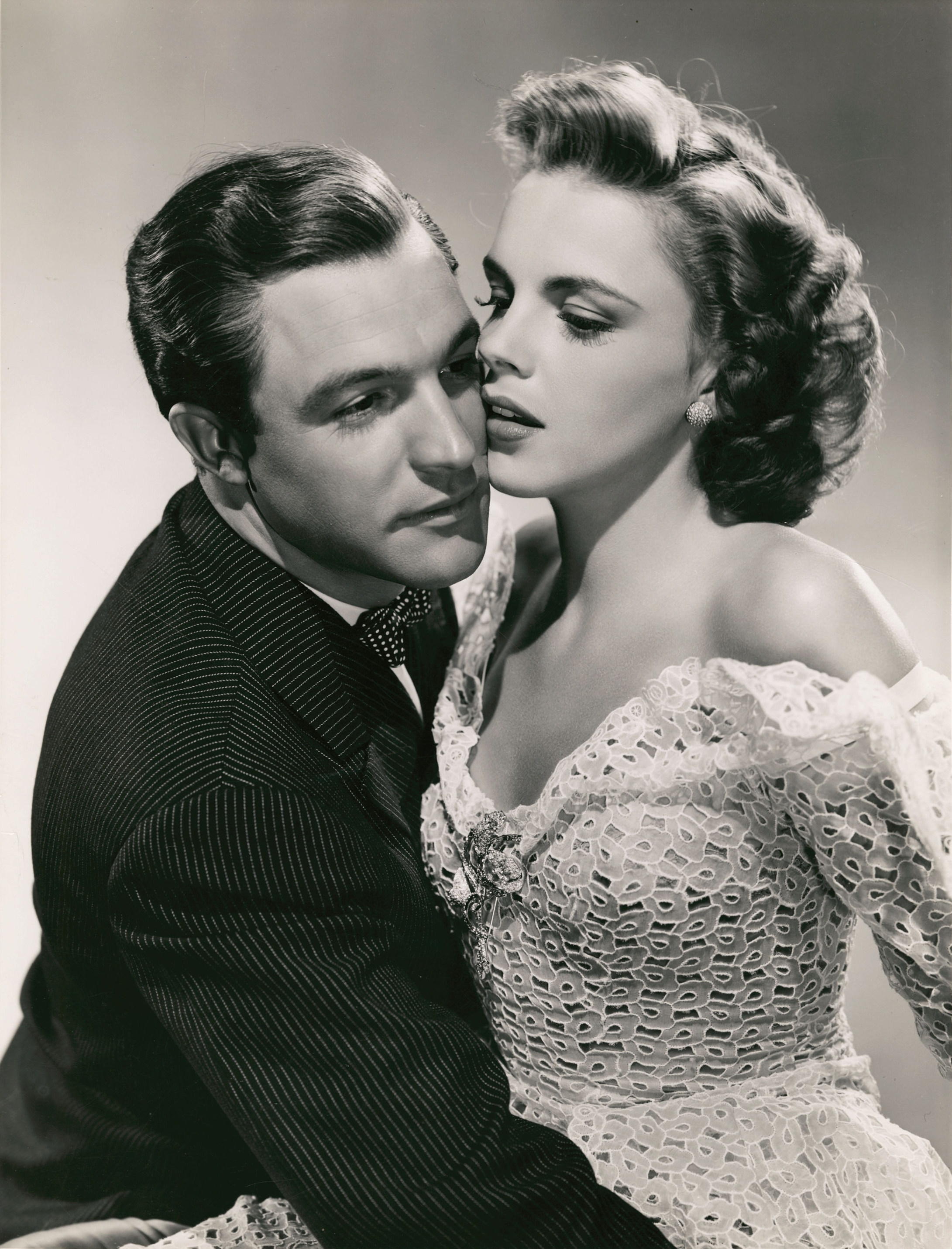
Garland and Gene Kelly in a publicity photo for For Me and My Gal (1942)

In her next film, For Me and My Gal (1942), Garland performed with Gene Kelly in his first screen appearance. She was given the "glamor treatment" in Presenting Lily Mars (1943), in which she was dressed in "grown-up" gowns. Her lightened hair was also pulled up in a stylish fashion. However, no matter how glamorous or beautiful she appeared on screen or in photographs, Garland was never confident about her appearance and never escaped the girl-next-door image that the studio had originally created for her. She had a second abortion in that same year when she became pregnant during an affair with actor Tyrone Power.

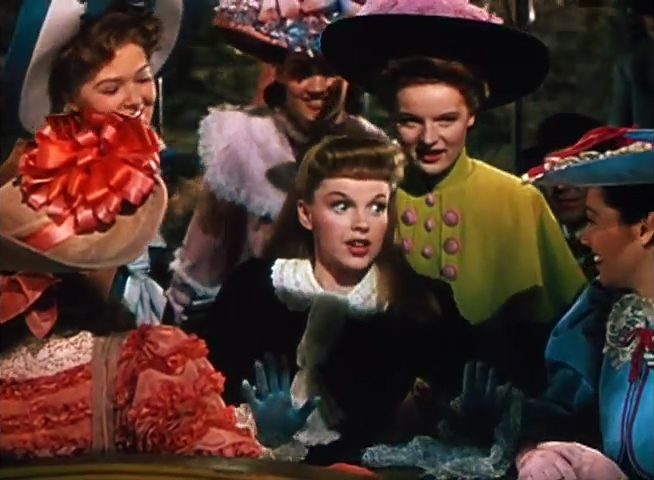
Garland singing "The Trolley Song" in the Meet Me in St. Louis trailer (1944)

One of Garland's most successful films for MGM was Meet Me in St. Louis (1944), in which she introduced three standards: "The Trolley Song," "The Boy Next Door," and "Have Yourself a Merry Little Christmas". This was one of the first films in her career that gave her the opportunity to be an attractive leading lady. When Vincente Minnelli was assigned to direct the film, he requested that Garland be assigned make-up artist Dorothy Ponedel, who refined Garland's appearance in several ways: extending and reshaping her eyebrows, changing her hairline, modifying her lip line, and removing her nose discs and dental caps. Garland appreciated the results so much that Ponedel was written into her contract for all her remaining pictures at MGM.

Around the same time, Garland had a brief affair with actor and film director Orson Welles, who was then married to actress Rita Hayworth. They ended the affair in early 1945 but remained on good terms afterwards.

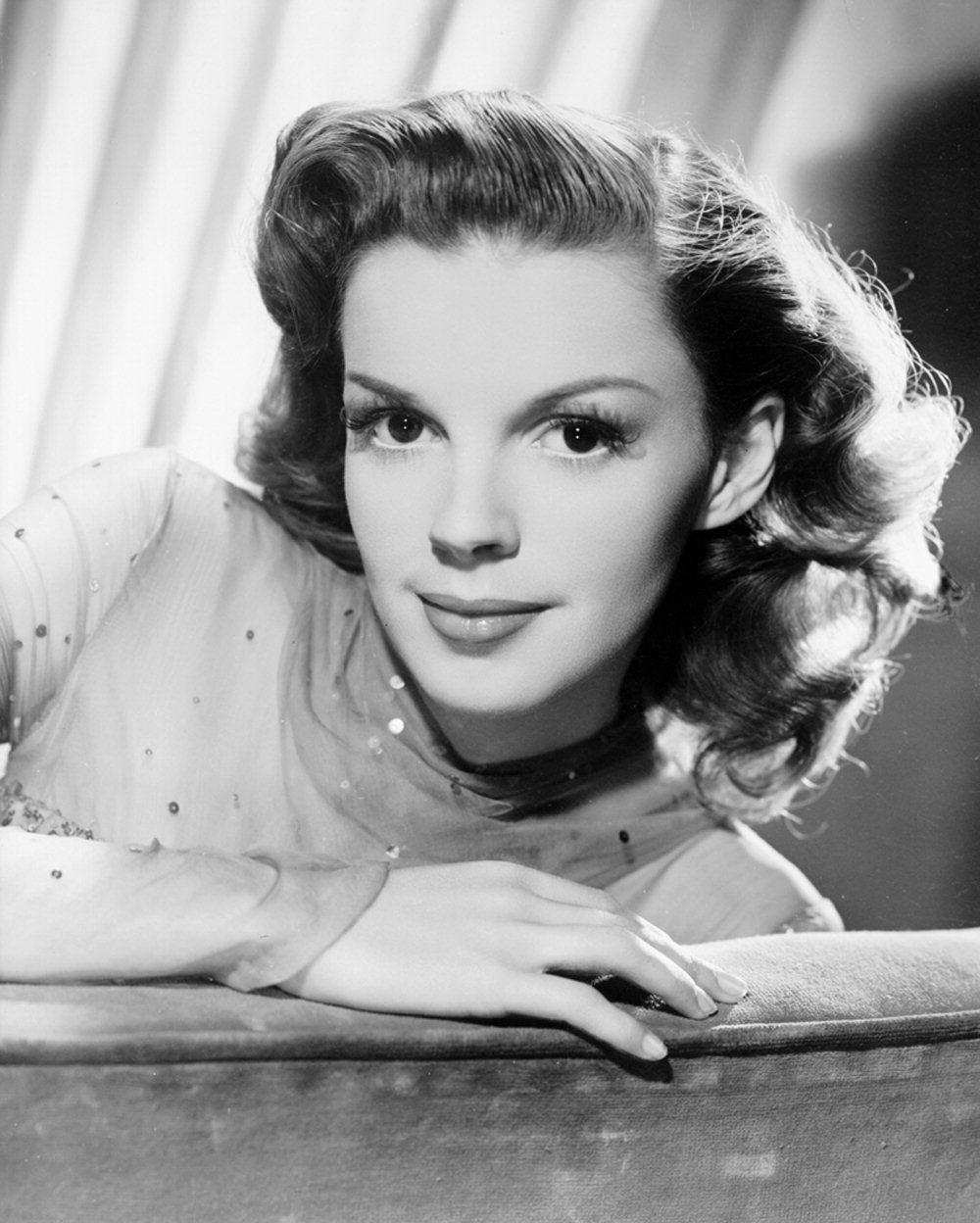
Garland in 1945

During the filming of Meet Me in St. Louis, Garland and Minnelli had some initial conflicts, but they entered into a relationship and married on June 15, 1945. On March 12, 1946, her daughter Liza was born.

The Clock (1945) was Garland's first straight dramatic film, with Robert Walker cast in the main male role. Though the film was critically praised and earned a profit, most movie fans expected her to sing. She did not act again in a non-singing dramatic role for many years. Her other films during this period include The Harvey Girls (1946), in which she introduced the Academy Award-winning song "On the Atchison, Topeka and the Santa Fe", Ziegfeld Follies (1946), and Till the Clouds Roll By (1946).

=== 1947–1950: Last MGM motion pictures ===
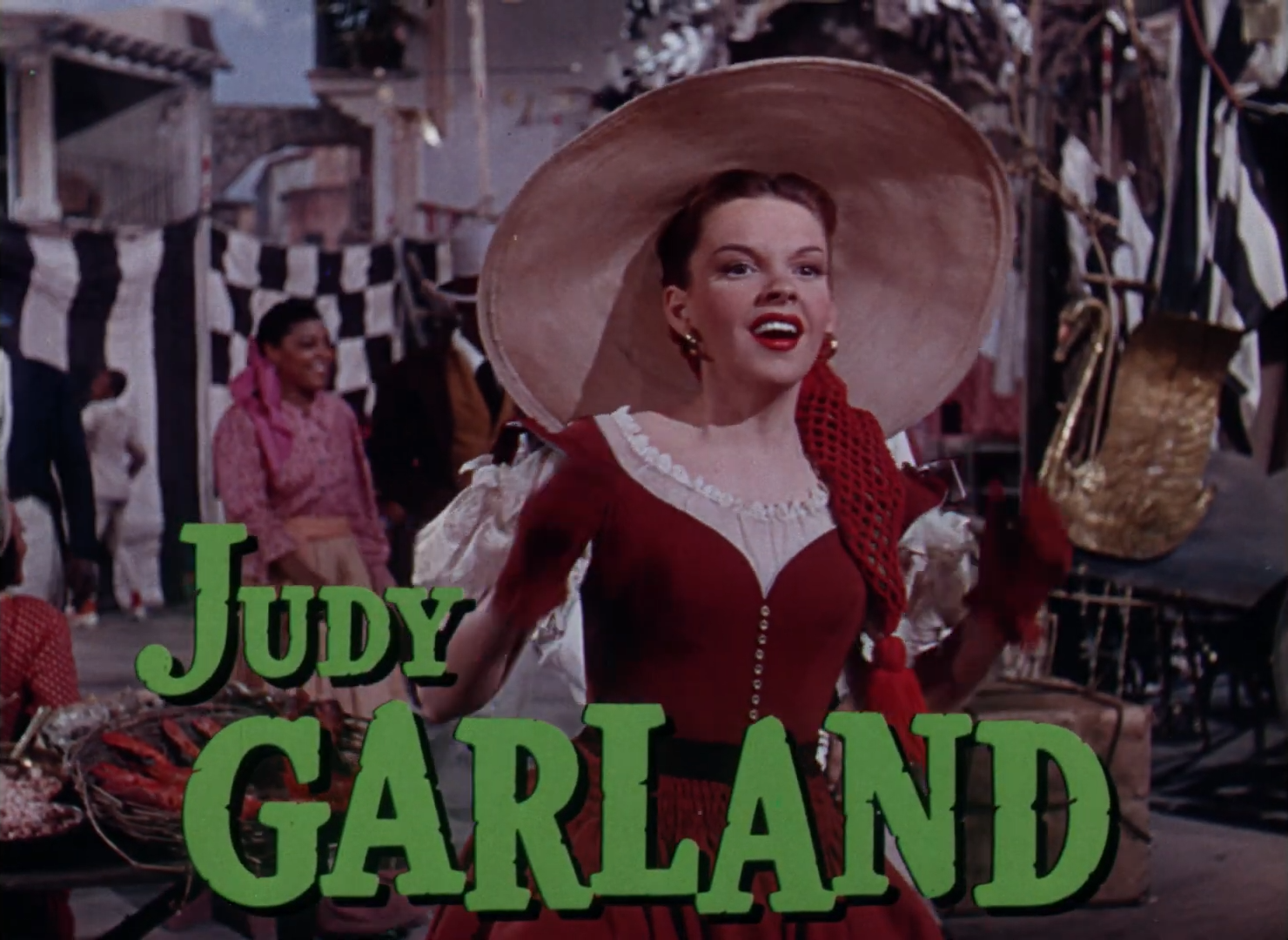
Garland in The Pirate trailer (1948) (Note: This particular scene was filmed in 1947.)

During the filming of The Pirate in early 1947, Garland suffered a nervous breakdown and was admitted to a private sanatorium. She was able to complete filming, but that July she made her first suicidal gesture, making minor cuts to her wrist with a broken glass. She agreed to be admitted to the Austen Riggs Center, a psychiatric hospital in Stockbridge, Massachusetts, in August, but after she arrived she, along with her maid and psychiatrist, checked in to the Red Lion Inn down the street instead. She briefly underwent outpatient psychiatric treatment at Austen Riggs before returning to California. The Pirate, released in May 1948, was the first of Garland's films not to make a profit since The Wizard of Oz. The main reasons for its failure were its cost, the increasing expense of the shooting delays while Garland was ill, and the general public's unwillingness to accept her in a sophisticated film.

Following her work in The Pirate, she co-starred for the first and only time with Fred Astaire, who replaced Gene Kelly after Kelly broke his ankle, in Easter Parade (1948). It was Hollywood's highest-grossing musical that year.

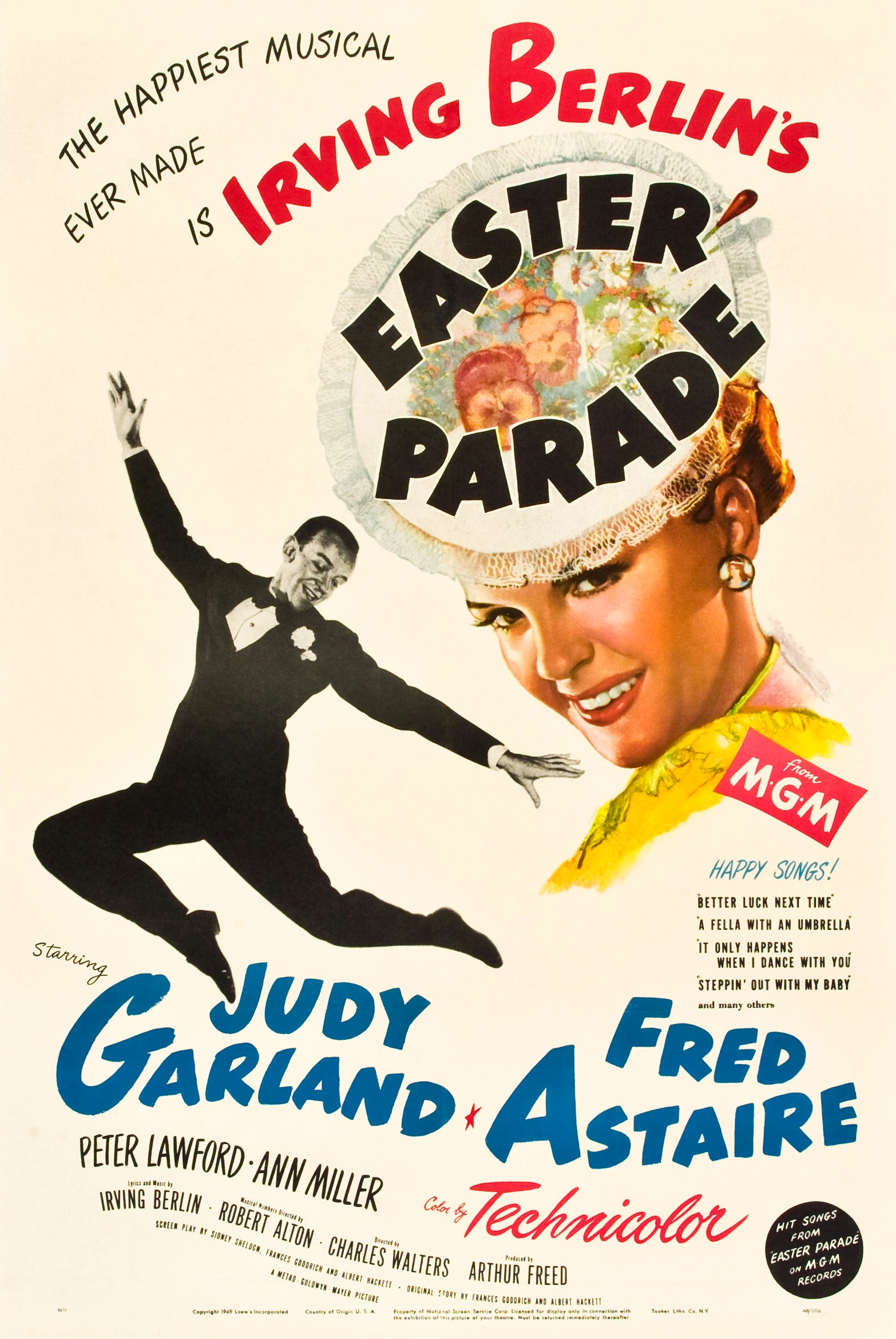
Garland in Easter Parade

Thrilled by the huge box-office receipts of Easter Parade, MGM immediately teamed Garland and Astaire in The Barkleys of Broadway. During the initial filming, Garland was taking prescription barbiturate sleeping pills along with illicitly obtained pills containing morphine. Around this time, she also developed a serious problem with alcohol. These issues, in combination with migraine headaches, caused her to miss several shoot days in a row. After being advised by her doctor that she would be able to work only in four- to five-day increments with extended rest periods in between, MGM executive Arthur Freed made the decision to suspend her on July 18, 1948. She was replaced in the film by Ginger Rogers.

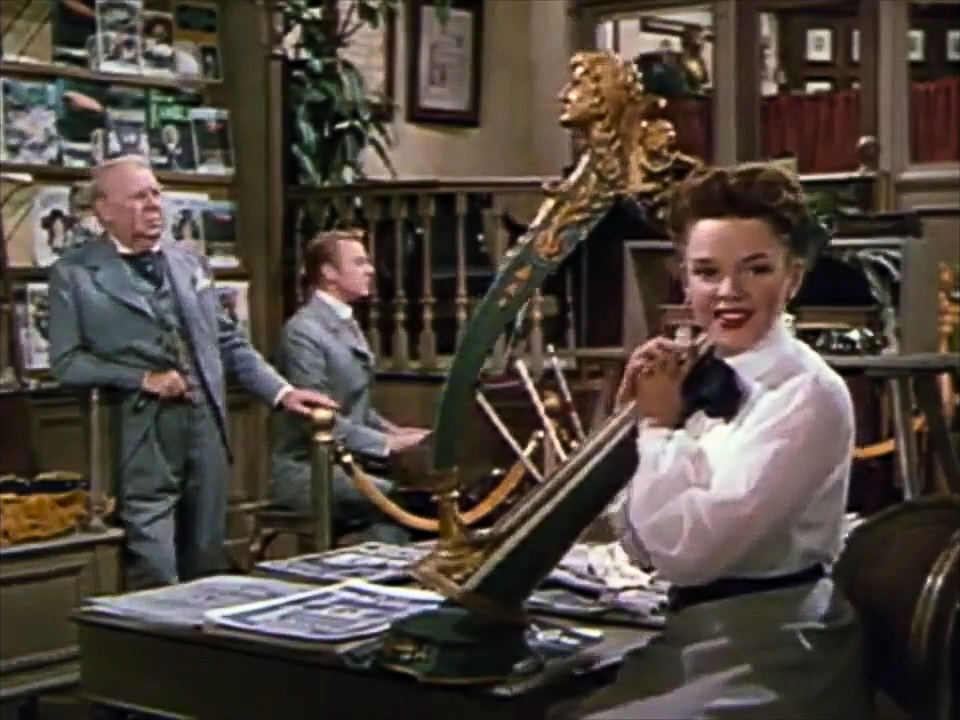
Garland in In the Good Old Summertime trailer (1949)

When Garland's suspension was over, she was summoned back to work. She performed two songs as a guest in the Rodgers and Hart biopic Words and Music (1948), which was her last screen appearance with Mickey Rooney. Despite the all-star cast, Words and Music barely broke even at the box office.

Having regained her strength during her suspension, Garland was able to return to MGM in the fall of 1948 to replace June Allyson in the musical film In the Good Old Summertime (1949) co-starring Van Johnson. Although Garland was sometimes late arriving at the studio during the making of this picture, she managed to complete it five days ahead of schedule. Her daughter Liza made her film debut at the age of two-and-a-half at the end of the film. In the Good Old Summertime was enormously successful at the box office.

Garland was then cast in the film adaptation of Annie Get Your Gun in the title role of Annie Oakley. She was nervous at the prospect of taking on a role strongly identified with Ethel Merman, anxious about appearing in an unglamorous part after breaking away from juvenile roles for several years, and disturbed by her treatment at the hands of director Busby Berkeley. He was disappointed by Garland's lack of effort, attitude, and enthusiasm. She complained to Mayer, trying to have Berkeley fired from the feature. She began arriving late to the set and sometimes failed to appear at all. At this time, she was also undergoing electroconvulsive therapy for depression. She was finally fired from the picture on May 10, 1949, and was replaced by Betty Hutton, who stepped in to perform all the musical routines as staged by Robert Alton.

Garland then entered Peter Bent Brigham Hospital in Boston on May 29, 1949. According to biographer Gerald Clarke, doctors put her on a regimen intended to restore her weight and energy, including regular meals and a fixed bedtime, explaining that she had to relearn how to eat and sleep.

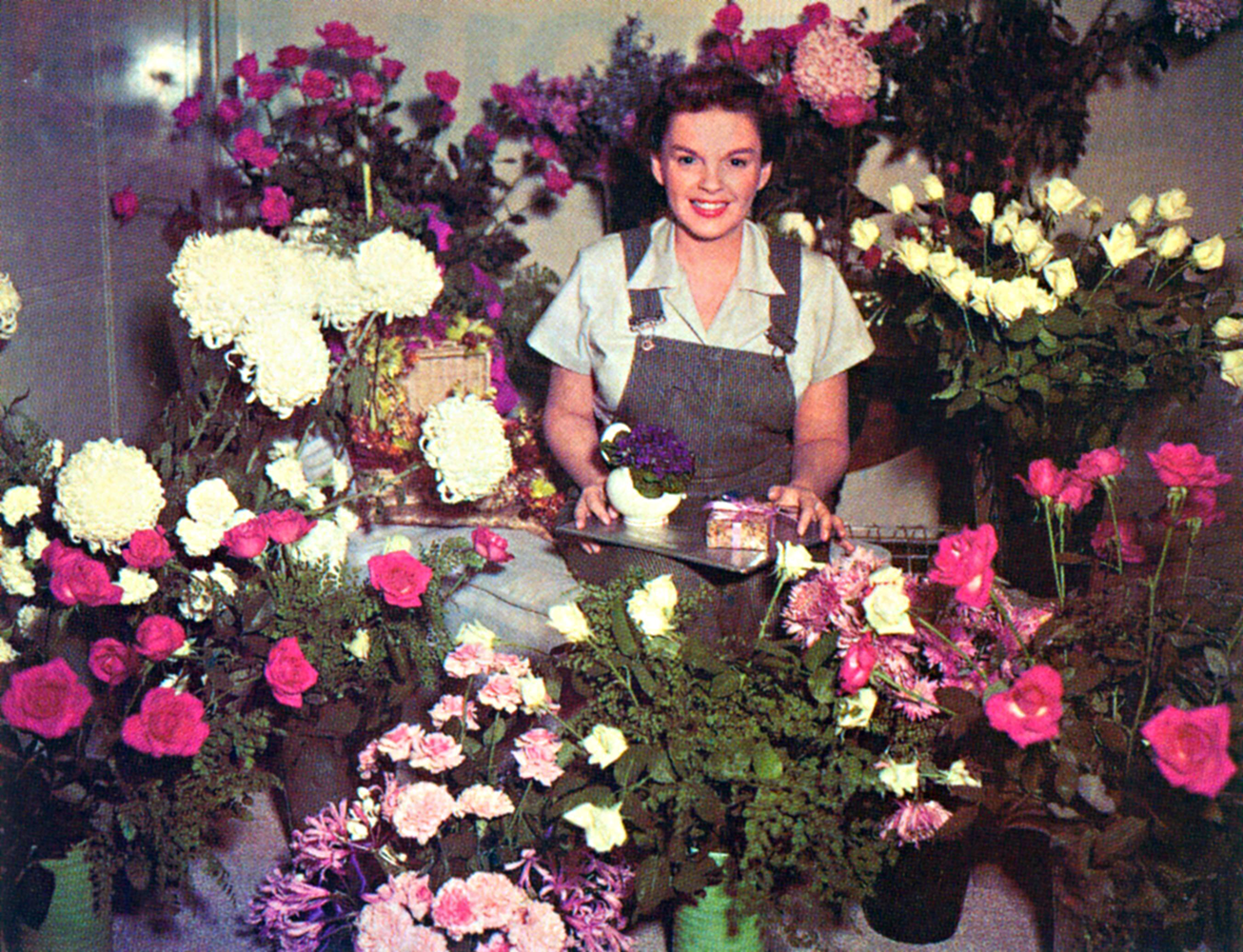
Garland on the set of Summer Stock (1950)

She returned to Los Angeles in the fall of 1949, having gained weight, and was cast opposite Gene Kelly in Summer Stock (1950), which took six months to complete. To lose weight, Garland went back on pills and a pattern of behavior resurfaced as she began showing up to the set late or not at all.

When principal photography on the film was completed in the spring of 1950, it was decided that Garland needed an additional musical number. She agreed to do it, provided the song was "Get Happy." In addition, she insisted that director Charles Walters choreograph and stage the number. By that time, Garland had lost 15 pounds and looked more slender. "Get Happy" was the final segment of the movie to be filmed. When released in the fall of 1950, Summer Stock drew big crowds and racked up very respectable box-office receipts; but because of the costly shooting delays caused by Garland, the film posted a loss of $80,000 to the studio. It would be her final picture for MGM.

She was next cast in the film Royal Wedding with Fred Astaire in 1950 after June Allyson became pregnant. However, because Garland failed to report to the set on multiple occasions, the studio suspended her contract on June 17, 1950, replacing her with Jane Powell. Reputable biographies published following Garland's death stated that after this dismissal, she slightly grazed her neck with a broken glass, requiring only a bandage. At the time, however, the public was informed that a despondent Garland had slashed her throat. "All I could see ahead was more confusion," she later said of this suicide attempt. "I wanted to black out the future as well as the past. I wanted to hurt myself and everyone who had hurt me." In September 1950, after 15 years with the studio, Garland and MGM parted company.

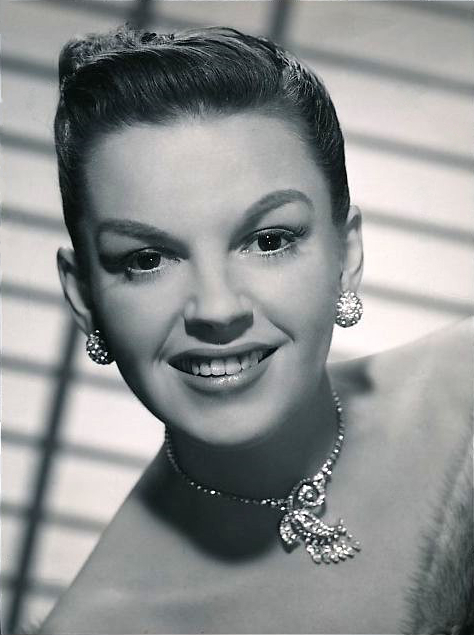
Publicity photo of Garland in 1950

=== 1950–1952: Radio appearances and stage comeback ===
Garland was a frequent guest on Kraft Music Hall, hosted by her friend Bing Crosby. Following Garland's second suicide attempt, Crosby, knowing that she was depressed and running out of money, invited her on his radio show—the first of the new season—on October 11, 1950.

She was standing in the wings of it trembling with fear. She was almost hysterical. She said, "I cannot go out there because they're all gonna be looking to see if there are scars and it's gonna be terrible." Bing said "What's going on?" and I told him what happened and he walked out on stage and he said: "We got a friend here, she's had a little trouble recently. You probably heard about it—everything is fine now, she needs our love. She needs our support. She's here—let's give it to her, OK? Here's Judy." And she came out and that place went crazy. And she just blossomed.

— Hal Kanter, Writer for Bing Crosby

Garland made eight appearances during the 1950–51 season of The Bing Crosby–Chesterfield Show, which immediately reinvigorated her career. Soon after, she toured for four months to sold-out crowds in Europe. In 1951 she began a four-month concert tour of Britain and Ireland, where she played to sold-out audiences throughout England, Scotland, and Ireland. The successful concert tour was the first of her many comebacks, with performances centered on songs by Al Jolson and the revival of vaudevillian tradition. Garland performed complete shows as tributes to Jolson in her concerts at the London Palladium in April and at New York's Palace Theater later that year.

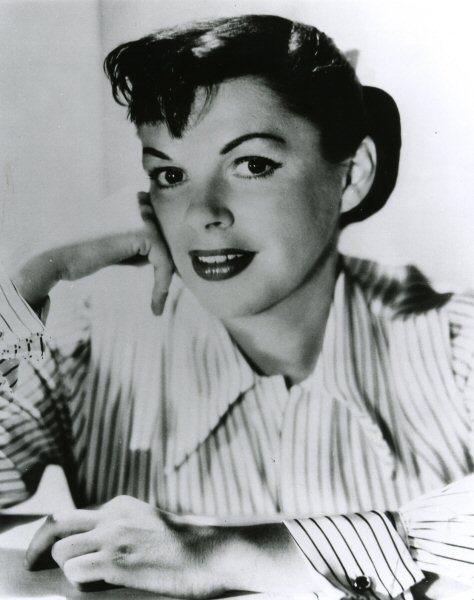
Garland in a publicity still (1954)

After the Palladium show, Garland said: "I suddenly knew that this was the beginning of a new life ... Hollywood thought I was through; then came the wonderful opportunity to appear at the London Palladium, where I can truthfully say Judy Garland was reborn." Her appearances at the Palladium lasted four weeks, where she received rave reviews and an ovation described by the Palladium manager as the loudest he had ever heard.

Garland's engagement at the Palace Theatre in Manhattan in October 1951 exceeded all previous records for both the theater and for Garland, and she was called "one of the greatest personal triumphs in show business history". She was honored with a Special Tony Award for her contribution to the revival of vaudeville.

That same year, she divorced Minnelli, and on June 8, 1952, she married her tour manager and producer Sidney Luft in Hollister, California. On November 21 that same year, Garland gave birth to her second daughter, Lorna Luft, who became an actress and singer. On March 29, 1955, she gave birth to a son, Joey Luft.

=== 1954–1963: Hollywood return, concerts, and television ===
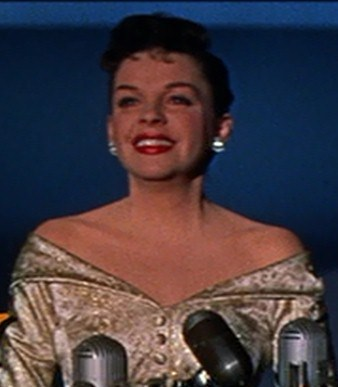
Garland in A Star Is Born (1954)

Garland appeared with James Mason in the Warner Bros. film A Star Is Born (1954), the first remake of the 1937 film. She and her then-husband Sidney Luft produced the film through their production company, Transcona Enterprises, while Warner Bros. supplied finances, production facilities, and crew. Directed by George Cukor, the film was a large undertaking to which Garland initially fully dedicated herself.

As shooting progressed, however, she began making the same pleas of illness that she had so often made during her final films at MGM. Production delays led to cost overruns and angry confrontations with Warner Bros. head Jack L. Warner. Principal photography wrapped on March 17, 1954. At Luft's suggestion, the "Born in a Trunk" medley was filmed as a showcase for her and inserted into the edit despite director Cukor's objections, who feared the additional length would lead to cuts in other areas. The film was completed on July 29.

Upon its world premiere on September 29, 1954, the film was met with critical and popular acclaim. Before its release, it was edited down at the instruction of Jack Warner, as theater operators—concerned about losing money because they were able to have only three or four shows per day instead of five or six—pressured the studio to make additional cuts. After its first-run engagements, about 30 minutes of footage were cut, sparking outrage among critics and filmgoers. Although the film was still popular, drawing huge crowds and grossing over $6 million (equivalent to $57 million in 2025) during its first release, A Star is Born did not make back its costs and ended up losing money. As a result, the secure financial position Garland had expected from the profits did not materialize. Transcona made no more films with Warner.

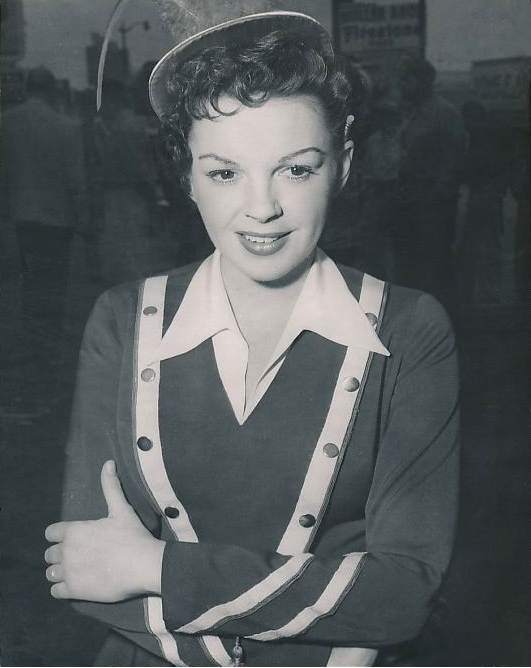
Garland filming a scene as a restaurant carhop for A Star Is Born (1954)

Garland was nominated for the Academy Award for Best Actress and, in the run-up to the 27th Academy Awards, was generally expected to win for A Star Is Born. She could not attend the ceremony because she had just given birth, so a television crew was stationed in her hospital room with cameras and wires to broadcast her anticipated acceptance speech. The Oscar was won, however, by Grace Kelly for The Country Girl (1954). The camera crew packed up before Kelly could even reach the stage. Groucho Marx sent Garland a telegram after the awards ceremony, declaring her loss "the biggest robbery since Brinks." Time labeled her performance as "just about the greatest one-woman show in modern movie history." However, Garland did win the Golden Globe Award for Best Actress in a Musical for her role.

Garland's films after A Star Is Born included Judgment at Nuremberg (1961), for which she was Oscar- and Golden Globe-nominated for Best Supporting Actress; the animated feature Gay Purr-ee (1962); and A Child Is Waiting (1963), with Burt Lancaster. Her final film was I Could Go On Singing (1963), with Dirk Bogarde.

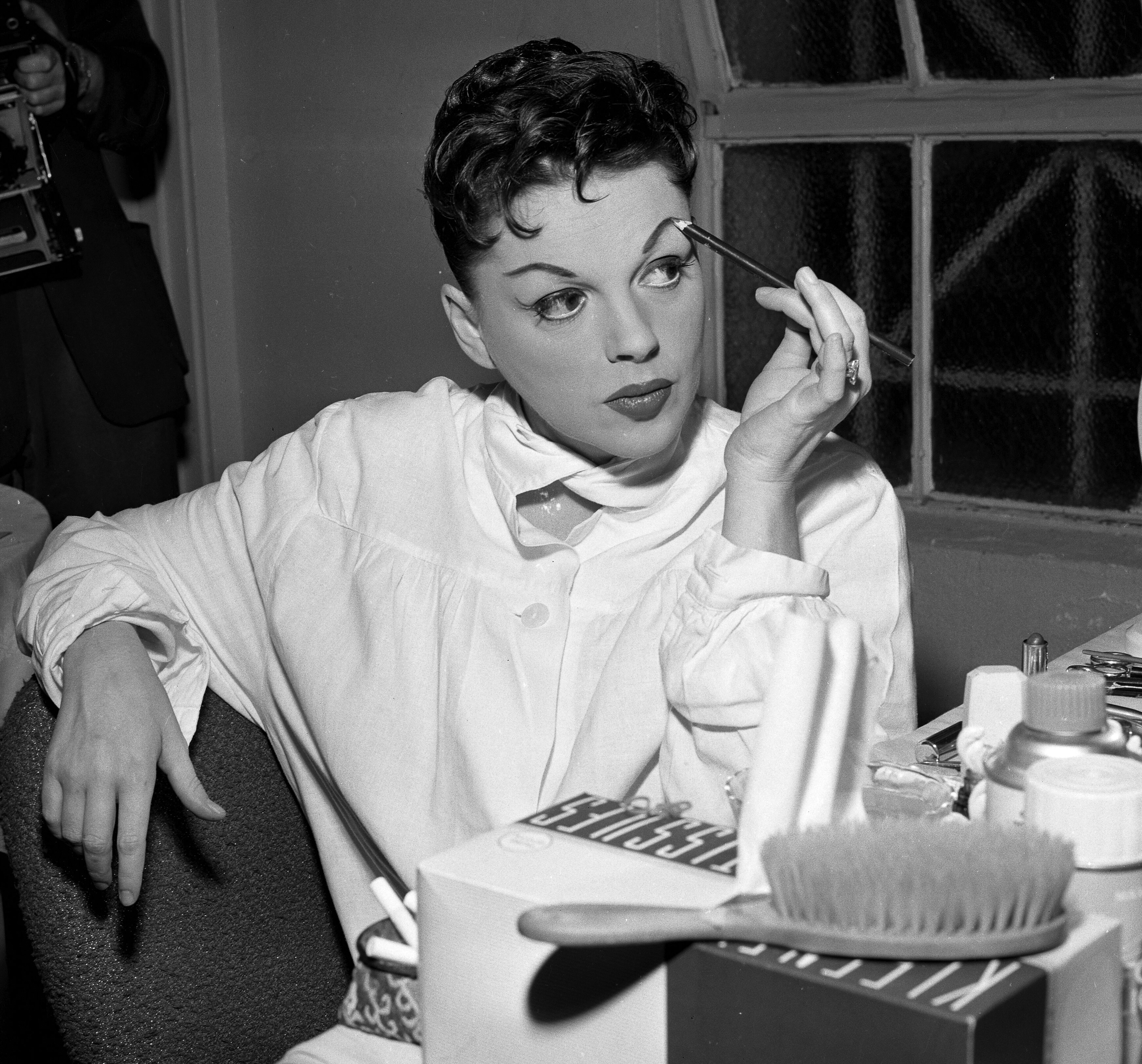
Garland in her dressing room at the Greek Theatre (1957)

Beginning in 1955 Garland appeared in a number of television specials. The first was the 1955 debut episode of Ford Star Jubilee, which was the first full-scale color broadcast on CBS and a ratings triumph, scoring a 34.8 Nielsen rating. She signed a three-year, US$300,000 (equivalent to $2,810,000 in 2025) contract with the network. Only one additional special was broadcast, however: a live concert-edition of General Electric Theater in 1956. The relationship between the Lufts and CBS then broke down in a dispute over the planned format of upcoming specials.

In 1956 Garland performed for four weeks at the New Frontier Hotel on the Las Vegas Strip for a salary of US$55,000 (equivalent to $500,000 in 2025) per week, making her the highest-paid entertainer to work in Las Vegas at the time. Despite a brief bout of laryngitis, when Jerry Lewis filled in for her for one performance while she watched from a wheelchair, her performances there were so successful that her run was extended an extra week. Later that year, she returned to the Palace Theatre, site of her 1951 triumph. She opened in September, once again to rave reviews and popular acclaim.

In November 1959 Garland was hospitalized after being diagnosed with acute hepatitis. Over the next few weeks, several quarts of fluid were drained from her until she was released from the hospital in January 1960, still in weak condition. She was told by doctors that she probably had five years or less to live and that, even if she did survive, she would be a semi-invalid and would never sing again. She initially felt "greatly relieved" at the diagnosis, commenting, "The pressure was off me for the first time in my life." Over the next few months, however, she recovered enough to be able to return to the stage at the London Palladium in August 1960. She felt so warmly embraced by the British that she announced her intention to move permanently to England.

At the beginning of 1960 Garland signed a contract with Random House to write her autobiography. The book was to be called The Judy Garland Story, a collaboration with Fred F. Finklehoffe. She was paid an advance of US$35,000 (equivalent to $290,000 in 2025), and she and Finklehoffe recorded conversations about her life to be used in producing a manuscript. Garland worked on her autobiography on and off throughout the 1960s but never completed it. Portions of her unfinished autobiography were included in the 2014 biography, Judy Garland on Judy Garland: Interviews and Encounters by Randy L. Schmidt.

Her concert appearance at Carnegie Hall on April 23, 1961, was a considerable highlight, called by many "the greatest night in show business history." The two-record album Judy at Carnegie Hall was certified gold, charting for 95 weeks on Billboard, including 13 weeks at number one. It won four Grammy Awards, including Album of the Year, Best Female Vocal of the Year, Best Album Cover, and Best Engineering Contribution.

=== 1961–1964: The Judy Garland Show ===
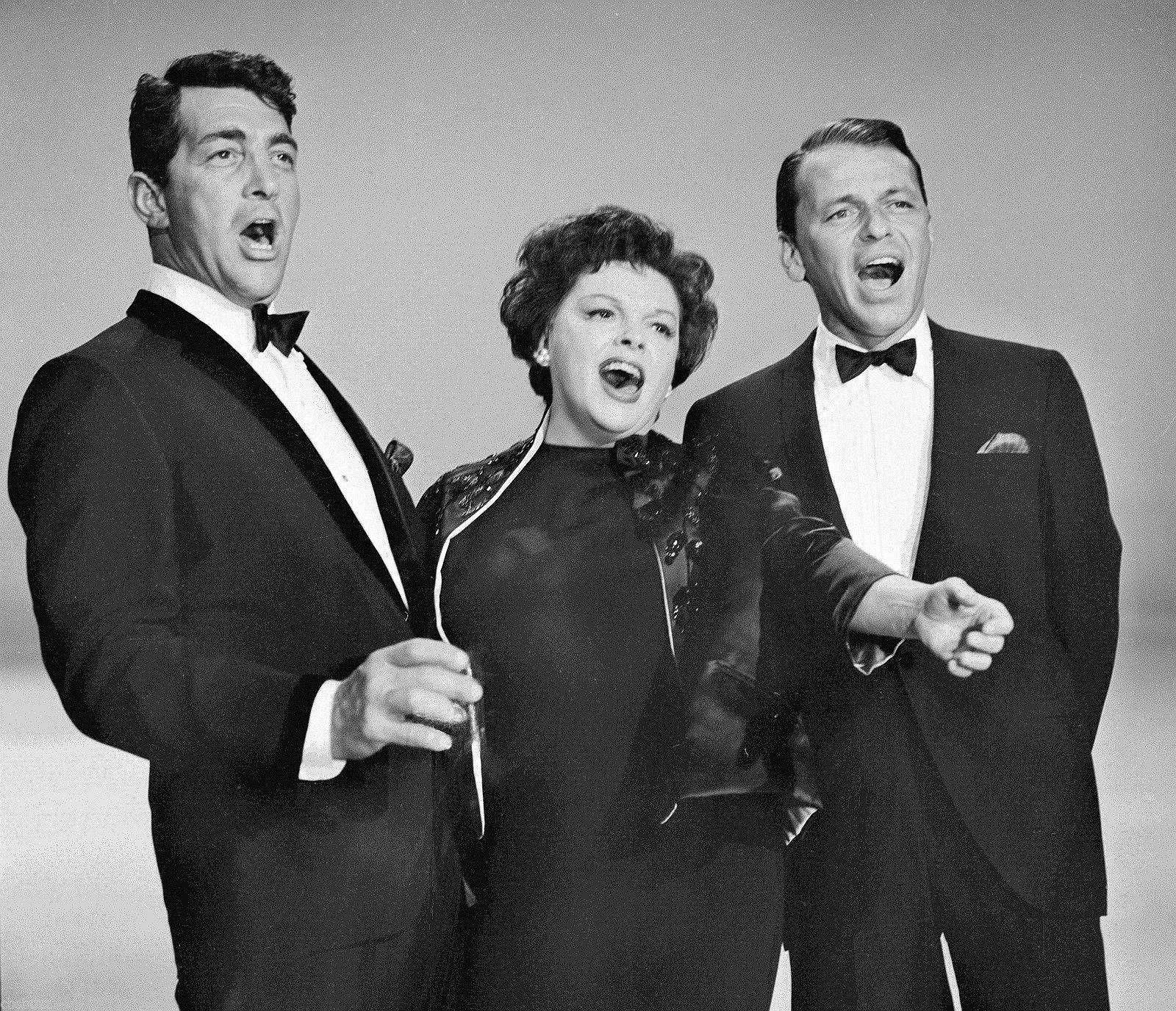
Dean Martin, Garland and Frank Sinatra on the 1962 television special The Judy Garland Show

In 1961 Garland and CBS settled their contract disputes with the help of her new agent, Freddie Fields, and negotiated a new round of specials. The first, The Judy Garland Show, aired on February 25, 1962, with guests Frank Sinatra and Dean Martin. Following this success, CBS made a $24 million offer (equivalent to $195.3 million in 2025) to Garland for a weekly television series of her own, also to be called The Judy Garland Show, which was deemed by the press at the time to be "the biggest talent deal in TV history." Although she had said as early as 1955 that she would never do a weekly television series, she was in a financially precarious situation in the early 1960s. She was several hundred thousand dollars in debt to the Internal Revenue Service, having failed to pay taxes in 1951 and 1952; and the failure of A Star is Born meant that she received nothing from that investment.

Following a third special, Judy Garland and Her Guests Phil Silvers and Robert Goulet, Garland's weekly series debuted September 29, 1963. The Judy Garland Show was critically praised, but for a variety of reasons (including being placed in the time slot opposite Bonanza on NBC), the show lasted only one season and was canceled in 1964 after 26 episodes. Despite its short run, the series was nominated for four Emmy Awards, including Best Variety Series.

During this time, Garland had a six-month affair with actor Glenn Ford. Garland's biographer Gerald Clarke, Ford's son Peter, singer Mel Tormé, and her husband Sid Luft all wrote about the affair in their respective biographies. The relationship began in 1963 while Garland was doing her television show. Ford would sit in the front row during tapings of the show while Garland sang. He is credited with giving Garland one of the more stable relationships of her later life. The affair was ended by Ford (a notorious womanizer, according to his son Peter) when he realized Garland wanted to marry him.

== Personal life ==
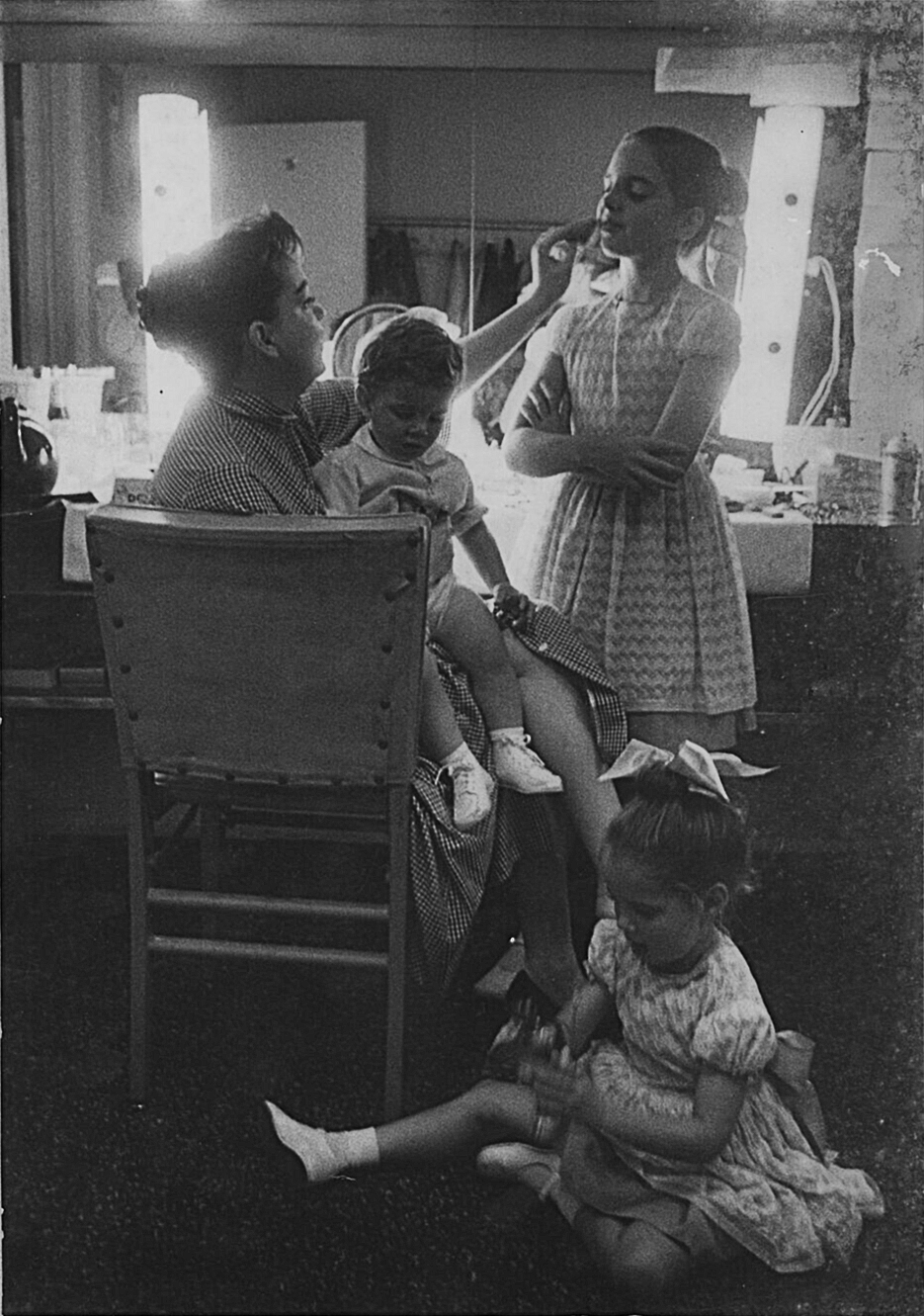
Garland backstage with her three children

As she rose to fame, Garland's personal life became a complex blend of public adoration and private struggles. Her career, while filled with legendary performances, was often overshadowed by her continuing struggles with self-image, addiction, and mental health, which were exacerbated by Hollywood's grueling expectations. Garland was married five times and had three children: with director Vincente Minnelli she had Liza Minnelli (born 1946) and with producer Sidney Luft she had Lorna Luft (born 1952) and Joey Luft (born 1955). Her relationships were often turbulent, influenced by her intense fame and personal challenges.

Despite personal struggles, Garland maintained close relationships with her children, all of whom later became involved in the entertainment industry. Her career and cultural impact have contributed to a lasting legacy in popular culture.

=== Political views ===
Garland was a life-long and active Democrat. During her career, she was a member of the Hollywood Democratic committee and a financial and moral supporter of various causes, including the Civil Rights Movement. She donated money to the campaigns of Democratic presidential candidates Franklin D. Roosevelt, Adlai Stevenson II, John F. Kennedy and Robert F. Kennedy, and Progressive candidate Henry A. Wallace.

In April 1944, Garland escorted Brigadier General Benjamin O. Davis Sr. to a reception honoring him at the home of Ira Gershwin. Davis, the first black general and highest-ranking black officer in the U.S. military, was in Los Angeles for the premiere of Frank Capra's documentary about black Americans serving in World War II.

In September 1947, Garland joined the Committee for the First Amendment, a group formed by Hollywood celebrities in support of the Hollywood Ten during the hearings of the House Un-American Activities Committee (HUAC), an investigative committee of the United States House of Representatives, led by J. Parnell Thomas. HUAC was formed to investigate alleged disloyalty and subversive activities on the part of private citizens, public employees, and organizations suspected of having communist ties. The Committee for the First Amendment sought to protect the civil liberties of those accused. Other members included Humphrey Bogart, Lauren Bacall, Dorothy Dandridge, John Garfield, Katharine Hepburn, Lena Horne, John Huston, Gene Kelly, and Billy Wilder. Garland took part in recording an all-star radio broadcast on October 26, 1947, Hollywood Fights Back, during which she exhorted listeners to action: "Before every free conscience in America is subpoenaed, please speak up! Say your piece! Write your congressman a letter—air mail special. Let the Congress know what you think of its Un-American Committee."

Garland was a friend of President John F. Kennedy and his wife Jacqueline Kennedy, and she often vacationed in Hyannis Port, Massachusetts. The house she stayed in during her vacations in Hyannis Port is known today as The Judy Garland House because of her association with the property. Garland would call Kennedy weekly, often ending her phone calls by singing the first few lines of "Over the Rainbow."

On August 28, 1963, Garland and other celebrities such as James Garner, Josephine Baker, Sidney Poitier, Lena Horne, Paul Newman, Rita Moreno, and Sammy Davis Jr. took part in the March on Washington for Jobs and Freedom, a demonstration organized to advocate for the civil and economic rights of black people. She had been photographed by the press in Los Angeles earlier in the month alongside Eartha Kitt, Marlon Brando, and Charlton Heston as they planned their participation in the march on the nation's capital.

On September 16, 1963, Garland—along with daughter Liza Minnelli, Carolyn Jones, June Allyson, and Allyson's daughter Pam Powell—held a press conference to protest the previous day's bombing of the 16th Street Baptist Church in Birmingham, Alabama, that had resulted in the death of four young black girls. They expressed their shock and outrage at the attack and requested funds for the families of the victims. During the press conference, Powell and Minnelli both announced their intention to attend the funeral of the victims.

=== Final years ===
In 1963, Garland sued Sidney Luft for divorce on the grounds of mental cruelty. She also asserted that he had repeatedly struck her while he was drinking and that he had attempted to take their children from her by force. She had filed for divorce from Luft on several previous occasions, even as early as 1956, but they had reconciled each time.

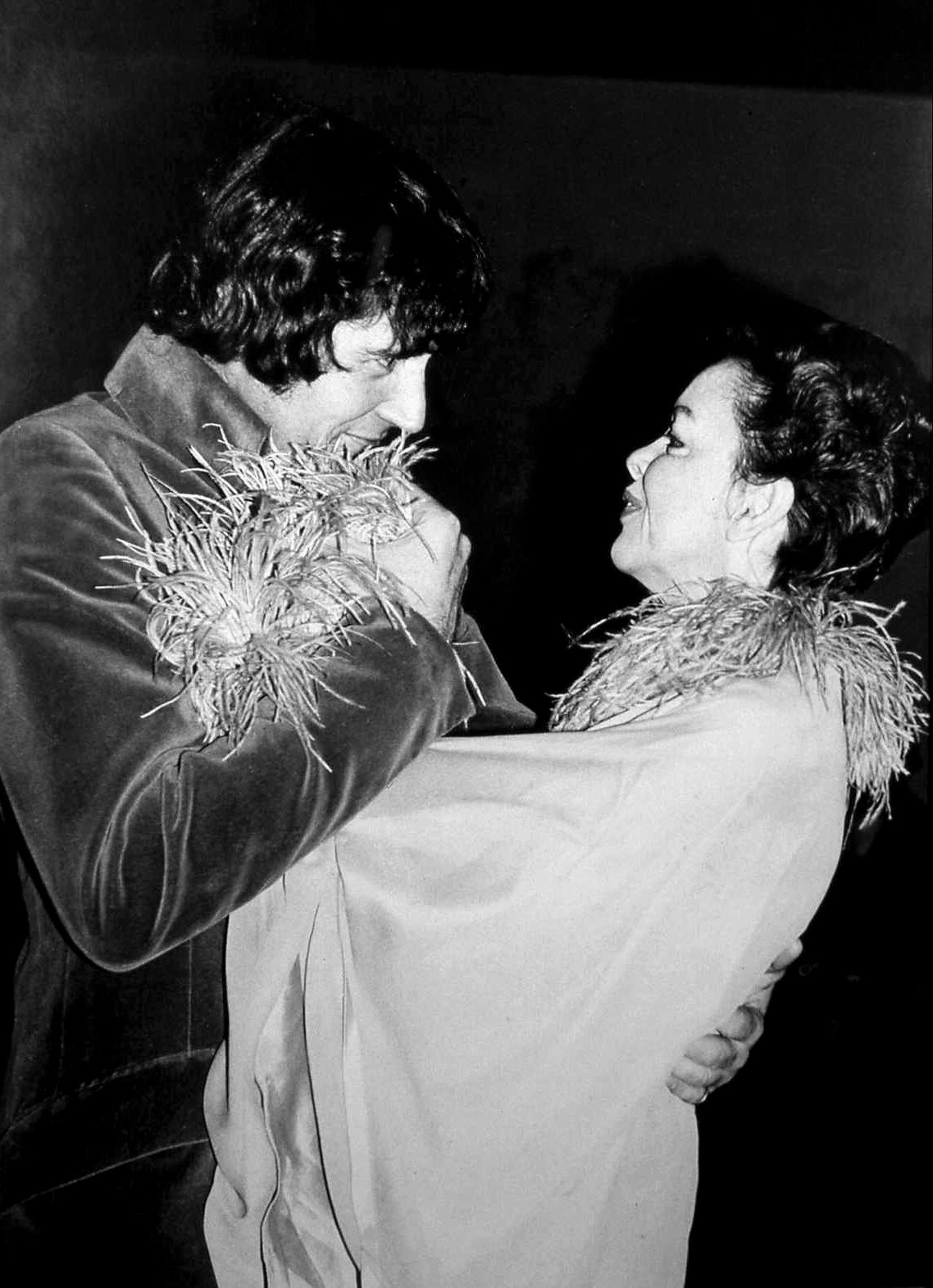
Mickey Deans and Garland at their London wedding in March 1969, three months before her death

After her television series was canceled, Garland returned to work on the stage. She returned to the London Palladium in November 1964, performing with her then-18-year-old daughter Liza Minnelli. One of her final appearances at the venue, the concert was also shown on the British television network ITV.

Garland also made guest appearances on The Ed Sullivan Show and The Tonight Show. She moved into guest-hosting for an episode of The Hollywood Palace with Vic Damone and was invited back for a second episode in 1966 with Van Johnson as her guest, but problems with her behavior ended her appearances on that show.

A 1964 tour of Australia also ended badly. Garland's first two concerts in Sydney were held in the Sydney Stadium because no concert hall could accommodate the overflow crowds who wanted to see her. Both went well, receiving positive reviews. However, her third performance, in Melbourne, started an hour late, angering the crowd of 7,000. Believing she was drunk, they booed and heckled her, and she fled the stage after 45 minutes. She later characterized the Melbourne crowd as "brutish." Her appearance was covered negatively in the press.

Garland's tour promoter Mark Herron announced that they had married aboard a freighter off the coast of Hong Kong, although she was not officially divorced from Luft at the time the ceremony was performed. When the divorce became final on May 19, 1965, she and Herron legally married on November 14 of that year. They separated five months later. During the divorce proceedings, Garland testified that Herron had beaten her; he claimed that he "only hit her in self defense."

Although Sidney Luft was Garland's manager for much of her career throughout the 1950s and early 1960s, they eventually parted ways professionally when she signed with agents Freddie Fields and David Begelman. By the fall of 1966, Garland had also split from them; their mismanagement of Garland's money, as well as their embezzlement of much of her earnings, resulted in her owing around US$500,000 (equivalent to $3,780,000 in 2025) in total to the IRS and to personal creditors. The IRS placed tax liens on her home in Brentwood, Los Angeles, her recording contract with Capitol Records, and any other business deals from which she could derive an income. She was left in a desperate financial situation that saw her sell her Brentwood home at a price far below its value.

In February 1967, Garland was cast in the role of Helen Lawson in Valley of the Dolls by 20th Century Fox. According to co-star Patty Duke, she had been hired primarily to augment publicity for the film and was treated poorly on the set by director Mark Robson. After Garland's dismissal from the film, author Jacqueline Susann said in the 1967 television documentary Jacqueline Susann and the Valley of the Dolls, "I think Judy will always come back. She kids about making a lot of comebacks, but I think Judy has a kind of a thing where she has to get to the bottom of the rope and things have to get very, very rough for her. Then with an amazing inner strength that only comes of a certain genius, she comes back bigger than ever."

Returning to the stage, Garland made her last US appearances in a 27-show run at New York's Palace Theatre in July 1967, performing with her children Lorna and Joey Luft. Garland's 75% share of the profits generated by her engagement earned her more than US$200,000 (equivalent to $1,470,000 in 2025). On closing night at the Palace, however, federal tax agents seized the majority of her earnings.

By early 1969, Garland's health had deteriorated. However, she was able to do a five-week run of performances at the Talk of the Town nightclub in London, for which she was paid £2,500 per week. She made her last concert appearance in Copenhagen during March of that year. After her divorce from Herron was finalized on February 11, she married her fifth and final husband, nightclub manager Mickey Deans, at Chelsea Register Office, London, on March 15, 1969.

== Death and funeral ==
On June 22, 1969, Deans found Garland dead in the bathroom of her rented house in Cadogan Lane, Belgravia, London. She was 47 years old. At the inquest, Coroner Gavin Thurston stated that the cause of death was "an incautious self-overdosage" of barbiturates; her blood contained the equivalent of ten 1.5-grain (97 mg) Seconal capsules. Thurston stressed that the overdose had been unintentional and no evidence suggested that she had intended to die by suicide.

Garland's autopsy showed no inflammation of her stomach lining and no drug residue in her stomach, which indicated that the drug had been ingested over a long period of time rather than in a single dose. Her death certificate stated that her death was "accidental." Supporting the accidental cause, Garland's physician noted that a prescription of 25 barbiturate pills was found by her bedside half-empty, and another bottle of 100 barbiturate pills was still unopened.

A British specialist who had attended Garland's autopsy stated that she had nevertheless been living on borrowed time owing to cirrhosis, although a second autopsy conducted later reported no evidence of alcoholism or cirrhosis. As her Wizard of Oz co-star Ray Bolger commented at her funeral, "She just plain wore out."

After Garland's body had been embalmed and clothed in the same gray silk gown she wore at her wedding to Deans, Mickey Deans travelled with her remains to New York City on June 26, 1969, where an estimated 20,000 people lined up to pay their respects at the Frank E. Campbell Funeral Chapel in Manhattan. It remained open all night long to accommodate the overflowing crowd.

The next day, her A Star Is Born co-star James Mason gave a eulogy at the funeral, an Episcopal service led by the Rev. Peter Delaney of St Marylebone Parish Church, London, who had officiated at her marriage to Deans three months earlier. The public and press were barred. "Judy's great gift," Mason said in his eulogy, "was that she could wring tears out of hearts of rock ... She gave so richly and so generously, that there was no currency in which to repay her."

Garland was interred in a crypt in the community mausoleum at Ferncliff Cemetery in Hartsdale, New York, a town 24 miles (39 km) north of midtown Manhattan. However, at the request of her children, her remains were disinterred in January 2017 and re-interred 2,800 miles (4,500 km) across the country at the Hollywood Forever Cemetery in Los Angeles.

Upon Garland's death, despite her having earned millions during her career, her estate came to just US$40,000 (equivalent to $270,000 in 2025). Years of mismanagement of her financial affairs by her representatives and staff, along with her generosity toward her family and various causes, resulted in her poor financial situation at the end of her life. In her last will, signed and sealed in early 1961, Garland made many generous bequests that could not be fulfilled because her estate had been in debt for many years. Her daughter Liza Minnelli worked to pay off her mother's debts with the help of family friend Frank Sinatra. In 1978, a selection of Garland's personal items was auctioned off by her ex-husband Sidney Luft with the support of their daughter Lorna and son Joey. Almost 500 items, ranging from copper cookware to musical arrangements, were offered for sale; and the auction raised US$250,000 (equivalent to $970,000 in 2025) for her heirs.

Critic Doug Strassler observed that Garland "created one of the most storied cautionary tales in the industry, thanks to her many excesses and insecurities that led to her early death by overdose."

== Artistry ==
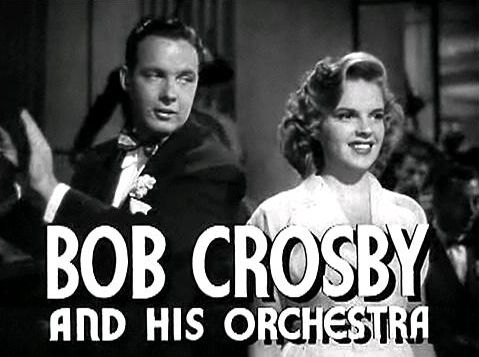
Garland with Bob Crosby in Presenting Lily Mars trailer (1943)

Garland's singing voice has been described as brassy, powerful, effortless and resonant, often demonstrating a tremulous, powerful vibrato. Although her range was comparatively small, Garland was capable of alternating between female and male-sounding timbres with little effort. The Richmond Times-Dispatch correspondent Tony Farrell described her as the "possessor of a deep, velvety contralto voice that could turn on a dime to belt out the high notes." Ron O'Brien, producer of tribute album The Definitive Collection—Judy Garland (2006), wrote that her combination of natural phrasing, elegant delivery, mature pathos "and powerful dramatic dynamics she brings to ... songs make her [renditions] the definitive interpretations."

The Huffington Post writer Joan E. Dowlin called the period of Garland's music career between 1937 and 1945 the "innocent years," during which the critic believed her voice was "vibrant and her musical expression exuberant," resonant and distinct, with a "rich yet sweet" quality "that grabs you and pulls you in." Garland's voice would often vary to suit the song she was interpreting, ranging from soft, engaging, and tender during ballads to humorous on some of her duets with other artists. Her more joyful, belted performances have been compared to entertainers Sophie Tucker, Ethel Merman, and Al Jolson. Although her musical repertoire consisted largely of cast recordings, show tunes, and traditional pop standards, she was also capable of singing soul, blues and jazz music, which Dowlin compared to singer Elvis Presley.

Garland always claimed that her talent as a performer was innate, commenting: "Nobody ever taught me what to do onstage." Critics agree that even when she debuted as a child, she had always sounded mature for her age, particularly on her earlier recordings. From an early age, Garland had been billed as "the little girl with the leather lungs," a designation the singer later admitted to having felt humiliated by because she would have much preferred to have been known to audiences as a "pretty" or "nice little girl."

Jessel recalled that even at only 12 years old, Garland's singing voice resembled that of "a woman with a heart that had been hurt." The Kansas City Star contributor Robert Trussell cited Garland's singing voice as one of the reasons that her role in The Wizard of Oz remains memorable, writing that although "[s]he might have been made up and costumed to look like a little girl ... she didn't sing like one," due to her "powerful contralto command[ing] attention."

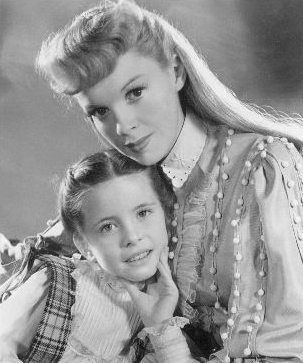
Garland with Margaret O'Brien in a publicity photo for Meet Me in St. Louis (1944)

Camille Paglia, writing for The New York Times, joked that even in Garland's adult life, "her petite frame literally throbbed with her huge voice," making it appear as though she were "at war with her own body." Musical theater actress and director Donna Thomason opined that Garland was an "effective" performer because of her ability to make her singing voice "a natural extension of [her] speaking voice," an asset that Thomason believed all musical theater actors should at least strive to achieve. Trussell agreed that "Garland's singing voice sounded utterly natural. It never seemed forced or overly trained."

Writing for Turner Classic Movies, biographer Jonathan Riggs observed that Garland had a tendency to imbue her vocals with a paradoxical combination of "fragility and resilience" that eventually became a signature trademark of hers, marked with power in her voice, pronounced enunciation, and projection of a sense of vulnerability through her singing and body language. As Michael Bronski remarked in his book Culture Clash: "There was a hurt in her voice and an immediacy to her performance that gave the impression that it was her pain."

Louis Bayard of The Washington Post described Garland's voice as "throbbing," believing it to be capable of "connect[ing] with [audiences] in a way no other voice does." Bayard also believed that listeners "find it hard to disentwine the sorrow in her voice from the sorrow that dogged her life," a comment echoed by Dowlin: "Listening to Judy sing ... makes me forget all of the angst and suffering she must have endured."

The New York Times obituarist observed that during Garland's later performances, whether intentionally or not, she "brought with her ... all the well-publicized phantoms of her emotional breakdown, her career collapses and comebacks" on stage, going on to comment that Garland's voice changed and lost some of its quality as she aged but that she retained much of her personality. Contributing to the Irish Independent, Julia Molony observed that by the time Garland performed at Carnegie Hall in 1961, her voice—although "still rich with emotion"—had finally begun to "creak with the weight of years of disappointment and hard-living."

Similarly, the essay accompanying the live record's entry in the National Recording Registry notes that "while her voice was still strong, it had also gained a bit of heft and a bit of wear"; author Cary O'Dell believes Garland's rasp and "occasional quiver" only "upped the emotional quotient of many of her numbers," particularly on her signature songs "Over the Rainbow" and "The Man That Got Away." For her part, Garland stated that regardless of the condition of her voice, she always felt most safe and at home while performing onstage.

Her musical talent was commended by her peers. Opera singer Maria Callas once said that Garland possessed "the most superb voice she had ever heard." Singer and actor Bing Crosby said that "no other singer could be compared to her" when she was rested. Aretha Franklin praised Garland as "one of the greatest singers there was."

Fred Astaire later commented on co-starring with Garland: "Judy's the greatest entertainer who ever lived—or probably will ever live—an amazing girl," and that "[s]he could do things—anything—without rehearsing and come off perfectly."

Garland was known for interacting with her audiences during live performances. The New York Times obituarist wrote that she possessed "a seemingly unquenchable need for her audiences to respond with acclaim and affection. And often, they did, screaming, 'We love you, Judy – we love you.'" Garland herself explained: "A really great reception makes me feel like I have a great big warm heating pad all over me ... I truly have a great love for an audience and I used to want to prove it to them by giving them blood. But I have a funny new thing now, a real determination to make people enjoy the show."

== Contemporary media ==
Garland faced numerous personal struggles throughout her life. She has been closely associated with her girl-next-door image. Early in her career during the 1930s, common names for Garland were "America's favorite kid sister" as well as the title "Little Miss Showbusiness."

In a review for the Star Tribune, Graydon Royce wrote that Garland's public image remained that of "a Midwestern girl who couldn't believe where she was," despite having been a well-established celebrity for over 20 years. Royce believes that fans and audiences insisted on preserving their memory of Garland as Dorothy no matter how much she matured, calling her "a captive not of her own desire to stay young, but a captive of the public's desire to preserve her that way," accounting for why Garland was continually cast in roles significantly younger than her actual age.

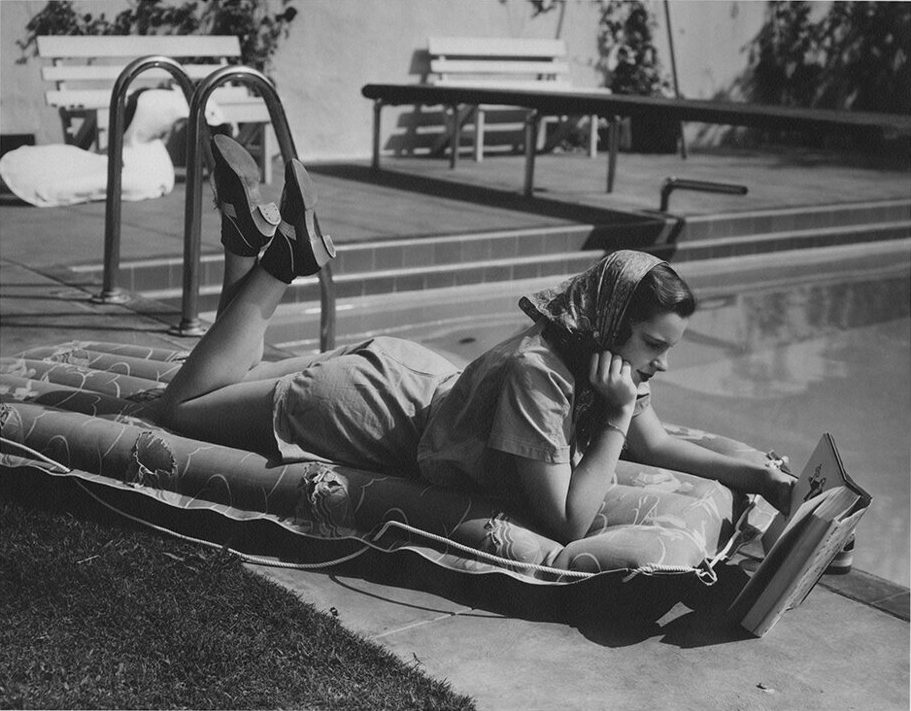
Garland relaxing in 1938

But Ruhlmann wrote that the singer's personal life "contrasted so starkly with the exuberance and innocence of her film roles." According to Malony, Garland was one of Hollywood's hardest-working performers during the 1940s, using that as a coping mechanism after her first marriage imploded. However, studio employees recall that Garland had a tendency to be quite intense, headstrong, and volatile; David Shipman, author of Judy Garland: The Secret Life of an American Legend, claims that several individuals were frustrated by Garland's "narcissism" and "growing instability." Millions of fans were said to find her public demeanor and psychological state "fragile," as she appeared neurotic in interviews. Entertainment Weekly columnist Gene Lyons observed that both audiences and fellow members of the entertainment industry "tended either to love her or to hate her." Farrell called her "[a] grab bag of contradictions" that "has always been a feast for the American imagination," with a public persona "awkward yet direct, bashful yet brash."

MGM called Garland consistently tardy and her behavior erratic—which resulted in several delays and disruptions to filming schedules—thus unreliable and difficult to manage, resulting in her finally being dismissed from the studio.

Describing the singer as "tender and endearing yet savage and turbulent," Paglia wrote that Garland "cut a path of destruction through many lives. And out of that chaos, she made art of still-searing intensity." According to Paglia, the more Garland performed "Over the Rainbow," the more it "became her tragic anthem ... a dirge for artistic opportunities squandered and for personal happiness permanently deferred."

Despite her success as a performer, Garland suffered from low self-esteem, particularly with regard to her weight, because of which she constantly dieted to maintain at the behest of the studio and Mayer; critics and historians believe this was a result of having been told that she was an "ugly duckling" by studio executives.

At one point, Stevie Phillips, who had worked as an agent for Garland for four years, described her client as "a demented, demanding, supremely talented drug-addict." Royce argues that Garland maintained "astonishing strength and courage," even during difficult times. English actor Dirk Bogarde once called Garland "the funniest woman I have ever met."

Despite her personal struggles, Garland disagreed with the public's opinion that she was a tragic figure. Her younger daughter Lorna agreed that Garland "hated" being referred to as a tragic figure, explaining, "We all have tragedies in our lives, but that does not make us tragic. She was funny and she was warm and she was wonderfully gifted. She had great highs and great moments in her career. She also had great moments in her personal life. Yes, we lost her at 47 years old. That was tragic. But she was not a tragic figure."

Ruhlmann argues that Garland actually used the public's opinion of her tragic image to her advantage towards the end of her career.

== Legacy ==
=== Influence ===
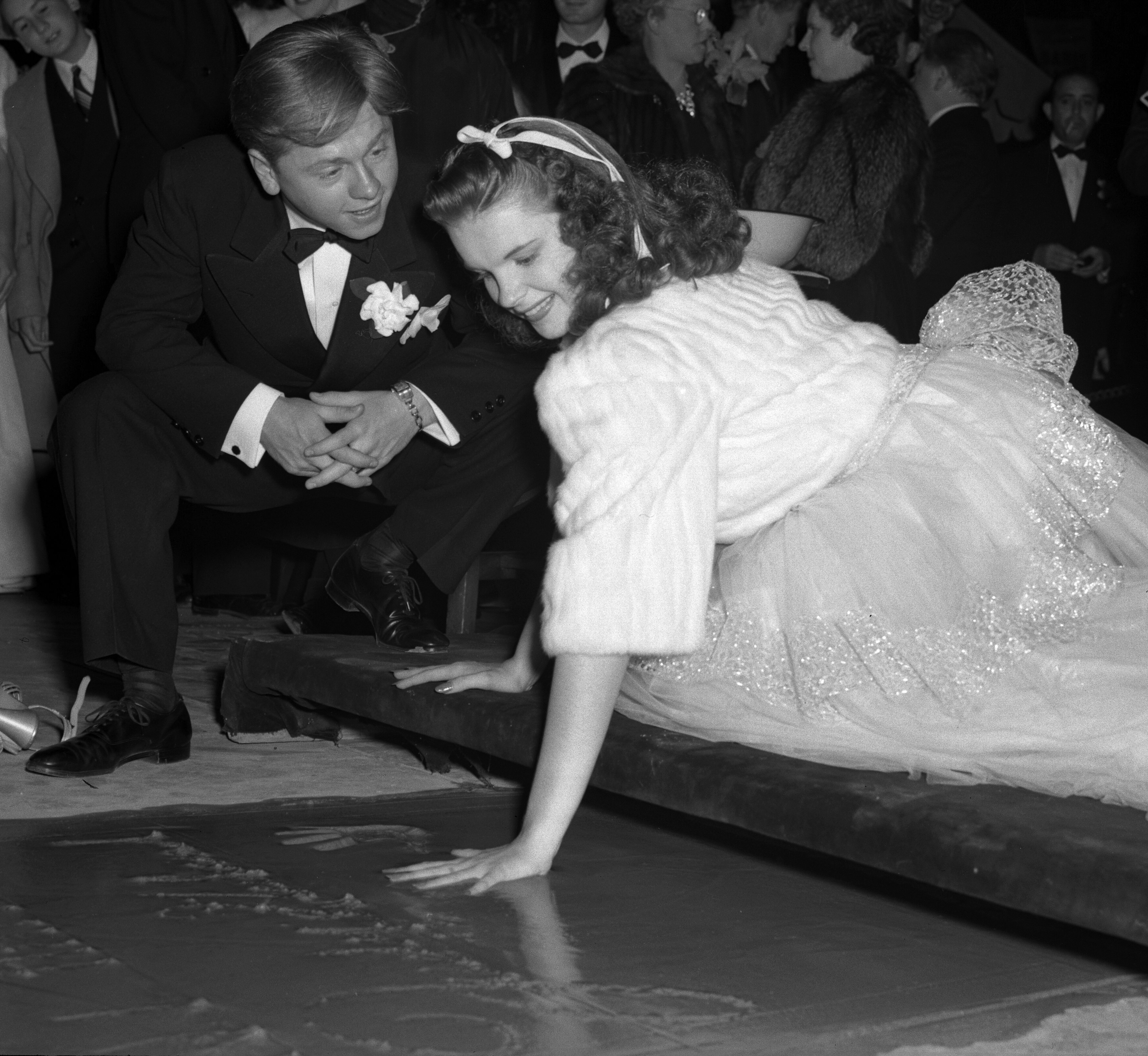
Mickey Rooney watching Garland put her handprint into concrete at Grauman's Chinese Theatre, 1939

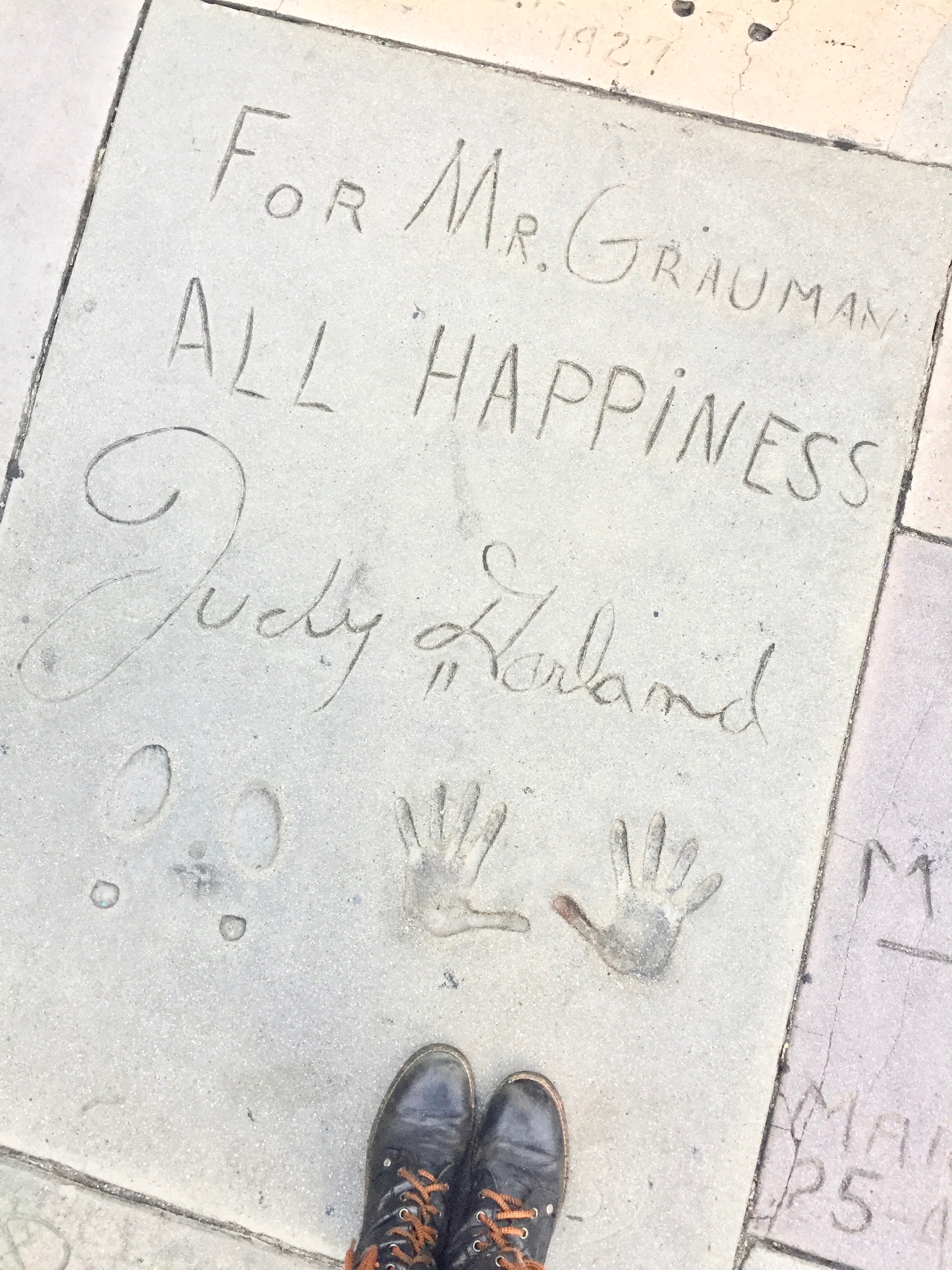
Garland's signature, handprints, and footprints in the concrete in front of Grauman's Chinese Theatre in Los Angeles

Garland has been called a triple threat due to her ability to sing, act, and dance, arguably equally well. Doug Strassler, a critic for the New York Press, used the "triple threat" description in characterizing her as one who "bounced between family musicals and adult dramas with a precision and a talent that remains largely unmatched." In terms of Garland's acting, Peter Lennon, writing for The Guardian in 1999, identified her as a "chameleon" due to her ability to alternate between comedic, musical and dramatic roles, citing The Wizard of Oz, The Clock, A Star is Born, and I Could Go On Singing—her final film role—as prominent examples. Michael Musto, a journalist for W magazine, wrote that in her film roles, Garland "could project decency, vulnerability and spunk like no other star and she wrapped it up with a tremulously beautiful vocal delivery that could melt even the most hardened troll."

By the time of her death in 1969, Garland had appeared in more than 35 films. She has been called one of the greats of entertainment and her reputation has endured. In 1992, Gerald Clarke of Architectural Digest dubbed Garland "probably the greatest American entertainer of the twentieth century." Record producer Ron O'Brien believed that "No one in the history of Hollywood ever packed the musical wallop that Garland did," and that "She had the biggest, most versatile voice in movies. Her Technicolor musicals ... defined the genre. The songs she introduced were Oscar gold. Her film career frames the Golden Age of Hollywood musicals."

Turner Classic Movies dubbed Garland "history's most poignant voice." Entertainment Weekly's Gene Lyons named her "the Madonna of her generation." The American Film Institute placed her eighth among the greatest female stars of Golden Age Hollywood cinema. In June 1998, in The New York Times, Paglia wrote, "Garland was a personality on the grand scale who makes our current crop of pop stars look lightweight and evanescent." Garland's live performances towards the end of her career are still remembered by fans who attended them as "peak moments in 20th-century music."

The New York Times obituarist described Garland as both "an instinctive actress and comedienne," and that her performance style resembled that of "a music hall performer in an era when music halls were obsolete." Close friends of Garland's insisted that she never truly wanted to be a movie star and would have much rather devoted her career entirely to singing and recording records. AllMusic biographer William Ruhlmann believes that her ability to maintain a successful career as a recording artist even after her film appearances became less frequent was unusual for an artist at the time.

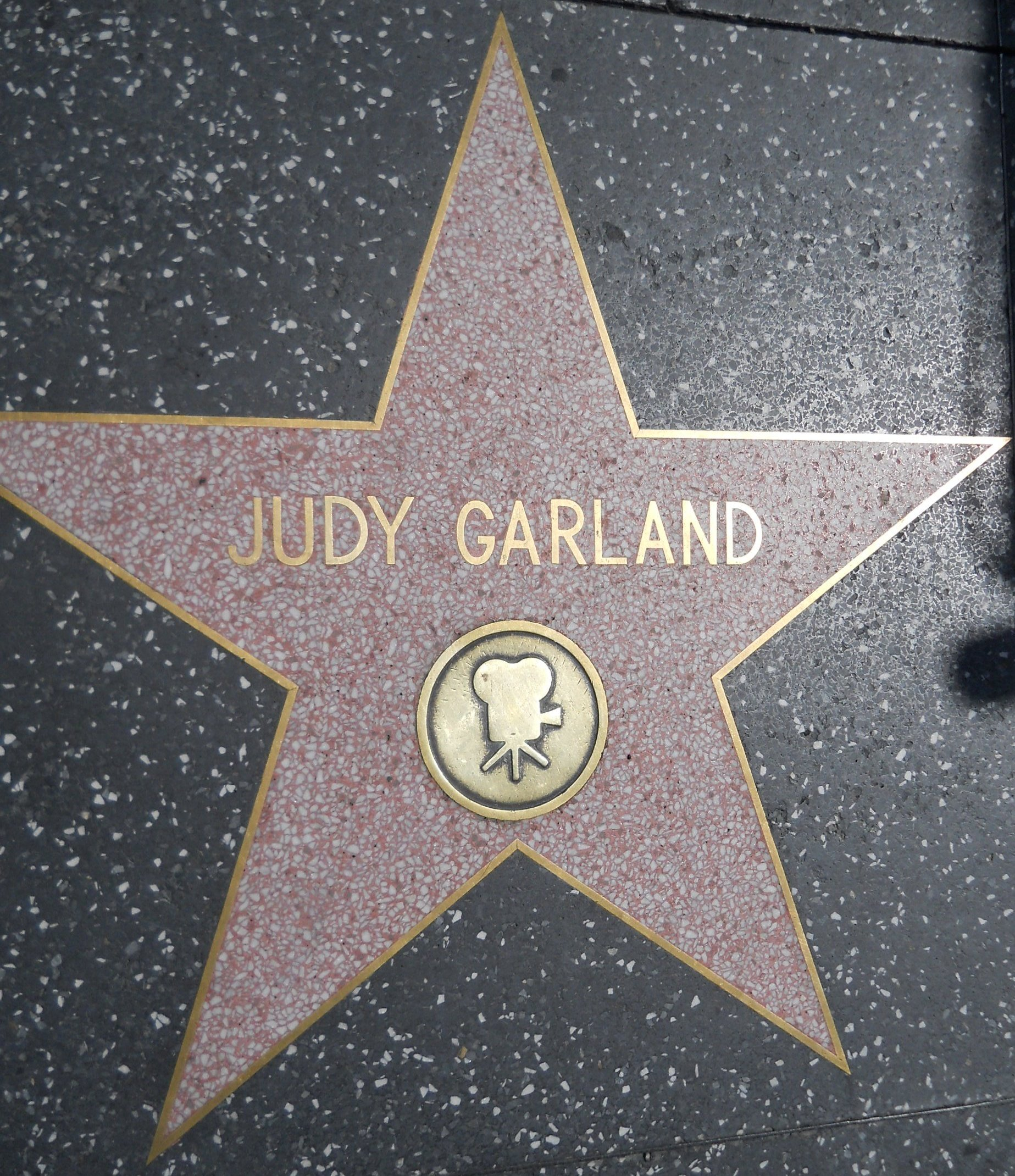
Star for recognition of film work at 1715 Vine Street on the Hollywood Walk of Fame; she has another for recording at 6764 Hollywood Boulevard.

In recent years, Garland's legacy has been sustained for fans of different ages, both younger and older. In 2010, The Huffington Post contributor Joan E. Dowlin concluded that Garland possessed a distinct "it" quality by "exemplif[ying] the star quality of charisma, musical talent, natural acting ability and, despite what the studio honchos said, good looks (even if they were the girl next door looks)." Ruhlmann commented that "the core of her significance as an artist remains her amazing voice and emotional commitment to her songs" and that "her career is sometimes viewed more as an object lesson in Hollywood excess than as the remarkable string of multimedia accomplishments it was." In 2012, Strassler described Garland as "more than an icon... Like Charlie Chaplin and Lucille Ball, she created a template that the powers that be [sic] have forever been trying, with varied levels of success, to replicate."

Garland was posthumously awarded the Grammy Lifetime Achievement Award in 1997. Several of her recordings have been inducted into the Grammy Hall of Fame. These include "Over the Rainbow," which was ranked as the number one movie song of all time in the American Film Institute's "100 Years...100 Songs" list; and four more Garland songs are featured on the list: "Have Yourself a Merry Little Christmas" (No. 76), "Get Happy" (No. 61), "The Trolley Song" (No. 26) and "The Man That Got Away" (No. 11).

She has twice been honored on U.S. postage stamps, in 1989 (as Dorothy) and in 2006 (as Vicki Lester from A Star Is Born). On June 10, 2022, the centennial of her birth, she was honored with a perfume named after her, entitled "Judy—A Garland Fragrance", created by Vincenzo Spinnato.

=== In the media ===
Subsequent celebrities who have suffered from personal struggles with drug addiction and substance use disorder have been compared to Garland, particularly Michael Jackson. Garland's elder daughter Liza Minnelli had a personal life that was almost parallel to that of her mother's, having struggled with substance use disorder and several unsuccessful marriages. Paglia observed that actress Marilyn Monroe would exhibit behavior similar to Garland's a decade earlier in Meet Me in St. Louis, particularly tardiness; and also compared Garland to entertainer Frank Sinatra due to their shared "emblematic personality ... into whom the mass audience projected its hopes and disappointments," but found that Garland lacked Sinatra's survival skills. Another artist with whom Garland's life and career was comparable to was American singer and actress Whitney Houston.

Garland has been portrayed on television by Andrea McArdle in Rainbow (1978); Tammy Blanchard (young Judy) and Judy Davis (older Judy) in Life with Judy Garland: Me and My Shadows (2001); and Sigrid Thornton in Peter Allen: Not The Boy Next Door (2015). In 2009, Harvey Weinstein optioned Get Happy: The Life of Judy Garland and planned to create a stage show and film based on the biography. Both were slated to star Anne Hathaway, though the two projects were ultimately shelved. Renée Zellweger played Garland in the biopic Judy (2019), for which she won the Academy Award for Best Actress.

On stage, Garland is a character in the musical The Boy from Oz (1998), acted by Chrissy Amphlett in the original Australian production and by Isabel Keating on Broadway in 2003. End of the Rainbow (2005) featured Caroline O'Connor as Garland and Paul Goddard as Garland's pianist. Adrienne Barbeau played Garland in The Property Known as Garland (2006). The Judy Monologues (2010) initially featured male actors reciting Garland's words before it was revamped as a one-woman show.

In music, she is referenced in the 1992 Tori Amos song "Happy Phantom," in which Garland is imagined to be taking Buddha by the hand. Amos also refers to Garland as "Judy G" in her 1996 song "Not the Red Baron." Garland is also the titular subject of Frog's "Judy Garland" single from 2015.

Garland has been the subject of over 30 biographies since her death, including the well-received Me and My Shadows: A Family Memoir by her daughter, Lorna Luft, whose memoir was later adapted into the television miniseries Life with Judy Garland: Me and My Shadows, which won Emmy Awards for the two actresses who portrayed her (Tammy Blanchard and Judy Davis).

== Discography ==
Studio albums

- The Wizard of Oz (with Victor Young and his orchestra) (1939)
- Girl Crazy (1944)
- Meet Me in St. Louis (1944)
- Miss Show Business (1955)
- Judy (1956)
- Alone (1957)
- Judy in Love (1958)
- The Letter (1959)
- That's Entertainment! (1960)
- The Garland Touch (1962)

== Notes ==
Awards and achievements
Preceded by Ella Fitzgerald for Ella in Berlin: Mack the Knife	Grammy Award for Best Female Pop Vocal Performance; 1962 for Judy at Carnegie Hall	Succeeded by Ella Fitzgerald for Ella Swings Brightly with Nelson
Preceded by Dave Brubeck, Marvin Gaye, Georg Solti, Stevie Wonder	Grammy Lifetime Achievement Award; 1997	Succeeded by Bo Diddley, Mills Brothers, Roy Orbison, Paul Robeson
