= Terrorist (disambiguation) =

A terrorist is an individual, organisation or nation who terrorizes masses of people such as by participating in terrorism.

Terrorist(s) or The Terrorist(s) may also refer to:

== Film ==
- The Terrorist (1962 film), an Argentine thriller film
- The Terrorist (1963 film), an Italian war drama film
- The Terrorists (film) or Ransom, a 1974 UK film starring Sean Connery
- The Terrorist (1994 film), an Egyptian film
- The Terrorist (1995 film), a South Korean film
- The Terrorist (1998 film), an Indian film
- Terrorists: The Kids They Sentenced, a 2003 Swedish documentary film
- The Terrorist (2010 film) or Five Minarets in New York, a Turkish film

== Literature ==
- Terrorist (novel), a 2006 novel by John Updike
- The Terrorist (novel), a 1997 young-adult novel by Caroline B. Cooney
- The Terrorists, a 1975 novel by Sjöwall and Wahlöö

== Other uses ==
- Terrorist (album), a 2005 album by Nattefrost, or the title song
- Terrorist (video game), a 1980 strategy game for the Apple II
- Jack Victory, American professional wrestler who also used the ring name The Terrorist
- "The Terrorist", a 1967 episode of The High Chaparral

== See also ==
- Terrorizer (disambiguation)
- Terror (disambiguation)
- Terrorism
