= Code Orange =

Code Orange may refer to:

- One of the hospital emergency codes
- Code Orange (band), an American hardcore punk band
- Code Orange (novel), a 2005 young adult novel by Caroline B. Cooney
- Code Orange (political party), a Dutch political movement
