= Abduction (2011 film) =

Film directed by John Singleton

- Theatrical release poster
- Directed by: John Singleton
- Written by: Shawn Christensen
- Produced by: Doug Davison; Ellen Goldsmith-Vein; Lee Stollman; Roy Lee; Dan Lautner; Patrick Crowley
- Starring: Taylor Lautner; Lily Collins; Alfred Molina; Jason Isaacs; Maria Bello; Sigourney Weaver
- Cinematography: Peter Menzies Jr.
- Edited by: Bruce Cannon
- Music by: Edward Shearmur
- Production companies: Vertigo Entertainment; Quick Six Entertainment; Tailor Made
- Distributed by: Lionsgate
- Release dates: September 15, 2011 (Grauman's Chinese Theatre); September 23, 2011 (United States)
- Running time: 105 minutes
- Country: United States
- Language: English
- Budget: $35 million
- Box office: $82.1 million

Abduction is a 2011 American action thriller film directed by John Singleton (in his final directed film before his death in 2019), produced by Roy Lee and Ellen Goldsmith-Vein, and written by Shawn Christensen. The film stars Taylor Lautner in the lead role, alongside Lily Collins, Alfred Molina, Jason Isaacs, Maria Bello, and Sigourney Weaver in supporting roles. The film follows a young man who sets out to uncover the truth about his life after finding a photo of himself as a child on a missing persons website. The film was released by Lionsgate on September 23, 2011, and grossed $82.1 million on a $35 million budget.

== Plot ==
Nathan Harper is an 18-year-old high school senior living in the suburbs of Pittsburgh, Pennsylvania, with his parents Kevin and Mara. He is troubled by recurring nightmares and has been seeing Dr. Geraldine "Geri" Bennett, a psychiatrist, for treatment.

Nathan is teamed with Karen Murphy for a school research project on missing children. He discovers that he looks very much like an age-progression photo of a missing child, Steven Price. When he investigates his background further, the information he learns suggests that he is not biologically related to his parents. Nathan asks Mara if she is his mother, and she confirms that she is not. Shortly thereafter, two men claiming to be from the Bridgewater Juvenile Justice Department arrive at the Harpers' home. The two men kill Mara and Kevin. Before he dies, Kevin shouts for Nathan to run. Nathan runs, but later returns for Karen, who was captured. Nathan rescues her and is forced to vacate the house because of a bomb.

The bomb blast injures Karen, so Nathan takes her to the hospital and attempts to contact the police. His call is intercepted by CIA operative Frank Burton, who tells Nathan he is in danger and that he will send two men to collect him. Dr. Bennett helps Nathan and Karen to escape. Burton explains that Nathan's biological father, Martin Price, stole an encrypted list of 25 corrupt CIA operatives from the Serbian terrorist and freelance intelligence broker Nikola Kozlow when Nathan was three. Kozlow planned on abducting Nathan to coerce Martin to hand over the list. Nathan was given to his adoptive parents for his own protection. Kozlow used the missing persons website to locate Nathan. Dr. Bennett gives Nathan the address of a safe house in Arlington, Virginia, and tells him to trust only Martin and a man named Paul Rasmus. Burton is warned by his superior to end the situation as soon as possible once he learns of Bennett, who is revealed to be a former CIA operative.

Arriving at the safehouse, the two obtain money, a gun, a photo of Nathan's biological mother Lorna Price, and a cell phone. Karen tries to call her family, but her call is intercepted by Burton and the CIA as well as Kozlow. The two are forced to flee. Finding the address for Nathan's mother, the pair discovers the address is a cemetery and that Lorna has died. Nathan and Karen find fresh flowers at her grave; the sender is Paul Rasmus, who lives in Nebraska. The two take an Amtrak passenger train to Nebraska, using fake IDs provided by their friend Gilly. En route, they confess their feelings for each other and share a kiss. They are unaware that they are being followed by Kozlow's right-hand man, who abducts Karen. He leaves her bound and gagged, but she frees herself. Nathan fights the assailant and throws him out the window. Burton's team finds Kozlow's henchman and tracks them down.

Burton tells Nathan about the data that Martin had stolen. Nathan believes that Burton's name may be on the list. The agents are attacked by Kozlow's snipers. Nathan and Karen flee in a car, but Kozlow calls and threatens to kill Karen's parents if Nathan does not hand over the data. Nathan gets Kozlow to agree to make the transaction at a Pittsburgh Pirates baseball game at their home stadium, PNC Park.

Nathan works with Gilly to obtain tickets and secures a gun with the intent to kill Kozlow. When Kozlow arrives, he tells Nathan how he killed his mother when Nathan was three after she refused to give up Martin's location. Kozlow grabs the gun from Nathan and demands the list. Nathan bolts and Kozlow gives chase, followed by CIA operatives. Nathan is called by Martin, who tells him to trust him and run to the south parking lot. Nathan does so and Kozlow is shot and killed by Martin. Burton and his agents arrive, and Burton asks for the cell phone. However, Martin had warned his superior about Burton's corruption. He takes the phone himself while Burton is taken into custody. Martin calls Nathan again, apologizing for not being the father he should have been. Nathan asks him to show himself, but Martin refuses. However, he assures Nathan no one will harm Karen or him, and then he disappears. Bennett arrives with Karen and says she has arranged for Nathan to live with her for the time being. Nathan and Karen go on a date.

== Cast ==
- Taylor Lautner as Nathan Harper / Steven Price
- Lily Collins as Karen Murphy
- Alfred Molina as Frank Burton
- Jason Isaacs as Kevin Harper
- Maria Bello as Mara Harper
- Sigourney Weaver as Dr. Geraldine "Geri" Bennett
- Michael Nyqvist as Nikola Kozlow
- Dermot Mulroney as Martin Price
- Nickola Shreli as Alec
- Elisabeth Röhm as Lorna Price
- Antonique Smith as Sandra Burns
- Denzel Whitaker as Gilly
- Ilia Volok as "Sweater"

== Production ==
=== Development ===
Lionsgate Films bought screenwriter Shawn Christensen's spec script for Abduction in February 2010, with actor Taylor Lautner attached to the film. The studio won a bidding war for the screenplay, acquiring it for $1 million. Gotham Group and Vertigo Entertainment had developed the script, based on a story idea by Gotham's Jeremy Bell.

Lionsgate rushed to start principal photography in July, due to Lautner's schedule to begin work on the last two Twilight films for Summit Entertainment. Writer Jeffrey Nachmanoff was hired to work on the screenplay, and John Singleton signed on to direct in March. Ellen Goldsmith-Vein, Lee Stollman, Roy Lee, and Doug Davison produced the film, and Jeremy Bell and Gabriel Mason executive produced. Lautner's father, Dan Lautner, also produced, the first film from their Tailor Made Entertainment label.

=== Filming ===
On a budget of $35 million, principal photography began on July 12, 2010, in the Pittsburgh, Pennsylvania area. Lionsgate returned to the region due to tax benefits from Pennsylvania's tax credit program, after filming My Bloody Valentine 3D, Warrior, and The Next Three Days there in 2008 and 2009. An open casting call for extras held at Carnegie Mellon University drew over 900 people in June, many of whom were teenage fans of the Twilight film series.

Many of the film's scenes were shot in suburban Mount Lebanon, some others in Forward Township, and Brownsville in Fayette County. Scenes were shot at Hampton High School in Hampton Township, a suburb north of Pittsburgh. The school's name and mascot, the Talbot, appeared in the film, as did biology students, cheerleaders, and the marching band. Production continued in Pittsburgh, Mount Lebanon, Greensburg, and Hampton Township, and lasted into September 2010.

== Music ==
Abduction (Original Motion Picture Soundtrack)

Soundtrack album by various artists
- Released: September 20, 2011
- Length: 47:46
- Label: Epic

No.	Title	Music	Length
1.	"To Be Loved"	Train	3:41
2.	"Come On Get It"	Lenny Kravitz	4:25
3.	"Heart Attack"	Raphael Saadiq	3:03
4.	"Twist"	Oh Land	2:51
5.	"Under My Skin"	Hot Bodies in Motion	2:18
6.	"Blame It on the Boom Boom"	Black Stone Cherry	3:07
7.	"The Witness"	Blaqk Audio	3:17
8.	"#1Nite (One Night)"	Cobra Starship	3:38
9.	"Good Girl"	Alexis Jordan	3:55
10.	"Novocaine Lips"	Matthew Koma	3:37
11.	"DJ Love Song"	Superstar Shyra	2:58
12.	"The Chorus"	Donora	3:49
13.	"Loving You Tonight"	Andrew Allen	3:00
14.	"Abduction Suite"	Edward Shearmur	4:07
Total length:			47:46

== Reception ==
=== Box office ===
Abduction opened in 3,118 theaters in the North America and Canada, and grossed $10,925,253, with an average of $3,504 per theater and ranking number four at the box office. The film ultimately earned $28,087,155 domestically and $54,000,000 internationally for a total of $82,087,155 against a budget of $35 million.

=== Critical response ===
Review aggregator Rotten Tomatoes gave Abduction an approval rating of 5% based on 106 reviews, with an average rating of 3.3/10. The site's critical consensus read, "A soulless and incompetent action/thriller that not even a veteran lead actor could save, let alone Taylor Lautner." On Metacritic, the film has a weighted average score of 25 out of 100, based on 20 critics, indicating "generally unfavorable" reviews. Audiences polled by CinemaScore gave the film an average grade of "B−" on an A+ to F scale.

R. Kurt Oselund of Slate Magazine was also critical of Lautner, saying that he "can't carry a movie any more than Abigail Breslin can carry a refrigerator." James Berardinelli gave it one out of four stars, saying, "For those who are indifferent to Lautner or who don't like him, the only way to survive Abduction is under the influence of a controlled substance, and even that may not be enough." Catherine Brown of Filmink also gave it a scathing review, saying that "Singleton is poorly equipped to handle teenage angst, a fact made far worse by cringe-worthy dialogue and a wooden leading man who proves that he has not yet developed the skills required to carry a film."

A less critical review came from Owen Gleiberman of Entertainment Weekly, who gave the film a C, commenting that Lautner is "not a terrible actor, but if he wants a career after the Twilight fades, he'll pick better films." Likewise, Roger Moore of the Chicago Tribune gave the film two out of four stars, saying it "falls in the same corner of the youth market as the Twilight movies. Some moments and many lines feel cribbed from that series." Andrew Barker of Variety called the film "a haggardly slapdash Bourne Identity knockoff, never rising above the level of basic competence."

=== Accolades ===
Taylor Lautner was nominated for a Golden Raspberry Award for Worst Actor for his role in Abduction (also for The Twilight Saga: Breaking Dawn – Part 1), but lost to future Grown Ups 2 co-star Adam Sandler for both Jack and Jill and Just Go with It. It received two nominations at the 2012 Teen Choice Awards for Choice Action Movie and Choice Action Actor, with Lautner subsequently winning the latter. The film received a nomination for Best Standee for Feature Film at the 2012 Golden Trailer Awards. At the Golden Reel Awards 2011, Abduction was nominated for Outstanding Achievement in Sound Editing – Dialogue and ADR for Feature Film.

== Home media ==
Abduction was released on North American DVD and Blu-ray on January 17, 2012.

== See also ==
- The Face on the Milk Carton, the 1990 young-adult novel featuring a pre-Internet version of the same premise and later expanded into the Janie Johnson series and adapted into a 1995 television movie
