= Forbidden =

Forbidden may refer to:

== Science ==
- Forbidden mechanism, a spectral line associated with absorption or emission of photons

== Films ==
- Forbidden (1919 film), directed by Phillips Smalley and Lois Weber
- Forbidden (1932 film), directed by Frank Capra
- Forbidden (1949 film), directed by George King
- Forbidden (1953 film), directed by Rudolph Maté
- Forbidden (Proibito), a 1954 Italian film directed by Mario Monicelli
- Forbidden (1984 film), directed by Anthony Page
- The Forbidden, a 2018 Uganda film

== Literature ==
- Forbidden (Cooney novel), a 1994 novel by Caroline B. Cooney
- Forbidden (Dekker and Lee novel), 2011 novel by Ted Dekker and Tosca Lee
- Forbidden, a 2010 novel by Tabitha Suzuma
- "The Forbidden", short story by Clive Barker, from the Books of Blood

== Music ==
- Forbidden (band), an American thrash metal band
- Forbidden (Black Sabbath album) (1995), also the title track
- Forbidden (Todrick Hall album) (2018), also the title track
- Forbidden (Forbidden album) (2026)
- "Forbidden", a 2022 song by Chris Brown from Breezy

== Other uses ==
- Social norm, shared standards of acceptable behavior by groups
- Forbidden Technologies plc, a UK company
- "ForBiddeN", nickname of model-stylist Christine Dolce
- Forbidden Peak, in the North Cascades mountains, Washington state, United States
- HTTP 403, access denied error code, one of the HTTP stutes code
