= Clayburgh =

Clayburgh is a surname. Notable people with the surname include:

- Ben Clayburgh (1924–2013), American politician
- Jill Clayburgh (1944–2010), American actress
- Jim Clayburgh (born 1949), American theater director
- Rick Clayburgh (born 1960), American politician
