= Janie Johnson series =

Series of novels by Caroline B. Cooney

- The Face on the Milk Carton; Whatever Happened to Janie?; The Voice on the Radio; What Janie Found; Janie Face to Face
- Author: Caroline B. Cooney
- Country: England
- Language: English
- Genre: Murder mystery
- Publisher: HarperCollins
- Published: 1990–2013
- Media type: Print (hardcover and paperback)
- No. of books: 5

The Jennifer "Jennie" Spring/Janie Johnson series is a series of young adult novels written by Caroline B. Cooney. The series focuses on a young woman's attempts to discover the truth about her background after seeing her own image on a milk carton.

== Series ==
=== The Face on the Milk Carton ===
While at lunch one day, Janie grabs a friend's milk carton, an action that will change her life. She notices the "missing person" photo on the back of the milk carton; it happens to be herself when she was very young. The milk carton says that Jennie Spring was kidnapped when she was three years old. Janie believes the carton must be some type of joke because her parents are very loving parents. Janie tries to put it out of her mind, but she begins having flashbacks of events and people that don't fit in with her life.

=== Whatever Happened to Janie? ===
Janie is forced to leave the home of her adoptive parents and live with her biological family. Although all of the Spring family is eager to include her, she desperately misses her adoptive parents, so she is emotionally aloof. She also has some trouble adjusting. She goes to a new school and lives in very close quarters with her brothers (Stephen, her older brother who always held himself responsible for losing Jennie; and twins Brendan and Brian, who were babies at the time of Jennie's kidnapping), and sister Jodie who was her older sister when Jennie was kidnapped and resented being compared to her. As things start to improve and Janie starts to feel more at home, though, they experience a setback when the FBI shows up. Janie ends up returning to her adoptive family but still keeps in contact with her old family.

=== The Voice on the Radio ===
Reeve Shields is in college, and Janie is very anxious to finish high school so she can go to college with him. One day, Reeve gets a spot on the local college radio. Embarrassed at having nothing to talk about because he doesn't know a subject, Reeve begins discussing the story of Janie's kidnapping, meeting her new family, and returning to her adoptive parents. However, when Janie decides to visit Reeve in Boston (where his college is) with her brother Brian and sister Jodie, she hears one of his college broadcasts. That same night, Reeve receives a call in from a woman claiming to be Hannah, but Reeve disconnects her before she can say much else. After that call, Reeve receives a call from Brian, asking him to come to the hotel room. There, the three confront Reeve, furious at him for selling them out on the radio. Janie breaks up with Reeve, refusing to speak to him again.

The rest of the novel deals with Reeve's efforts to talk to Janie, though she continuously refuses because he sold her out on the air along with her biological and adoptive families. When Pammy and Cordell suggest that he forgets about her and focus on getting a career as a professional radio disc jockey, Reeve is forced to return home to seek his parents' advice on what to do. When visiting her biological mother in New Jersey, Janie breaks down crying, and tells her everything. Mrs. Spring suggests that, though it might be difficult, Janie should forgive Reeve. When Reeve visits his family for Thanksgiving break, Janie holds out her hand and asks to talk to Reeve, and he reaches for it. Before the end of the novel, it is revealed that Hannah died many years ago in California, though by the fourth novel, it was revealed that this was not true.

=== What Janie Found ===
Frank Johnson has had a heart attack and stroke and Janie is asked by the distraught Miranda to help with the bills. Janie finds a folder marked 'H.J' in her father's files and wants to read it by herself, but her brother Brian and Reeve want to be included. They find out that Frank had been sending money to his supposedly dead daughter Hannah. They find an address, where Hannah may be living in Boulder, Colorado. Janie's older brother Stephen is currently going to college in Boulder so the three decide to go visit Stephen, all making up their own reasons to visit the area. While they are there, Brian and Reeve decide finding Hannah is a bad idea. Janie takes the longest to convince but eventually after she has a talk with Stephen she decides it would be best not to find Hannah, as it would be too painful for everyone. Janie mails Hannah the rest of the money and tells her to break off contact with the Johnson family. Meanwhile, Janie and Reeve repair their romantic relationship and Brian becomes much closer with Janie and her adoptive parents.

=== Janie Face to Face ===
By this time Janie is going to college under her legal name, Jennie Spring, though she prefers to remain Janie to her friends and acquaintances. She chooses a school away from both her families, in New York. She decides to move on from Reeve, her old boyfriend, and date someone else, only to find out he was a creep who was betraying her. She goes back to Reeve, who proposes marriage, and she accepts. Meanwhile, Hannah, the kidnapper, wants revenge: the girl she kidnapped was having a better life than the one she was living herself. Hannah doesn't know whether or not she should ruin the best day of Janie's life, her wedding to Reeve, or attack her parents, the ones who "ruined her life." At the same time, a writer is trying to gather information on Janie and her family for his book by sending several assistants to meet Janie and her family and friends (including the creepy guy who tried to "date" her). Everyone is told to ignore the writer, but Brendan, Janie's brother, meets with one of the writer's assistants, only to find out the man who was supposedly the author of the book didn't even know about the book himself.

The book also contains interludes describing the reasons why Hannah did what she did and how she lived between turning over Jennie to her parents and the present day. Hannah ultimately decides to ransack her parents' home during Jennie's wedding to Reeve (at which both sets of parents are present), and when Jennie is alerted, she immediately calls the police and Hannah is arrested at last. With this, Jennie permanently abandons her 'Janie' identity.

== Adaptations ==
In 1995, The Face on the Milk Carton was combined with Whatever Happened to Janie? and made into a for-television film called The Face on the Milk Carton, distributed by Fox Family (now Freeform), directed by Waris Hussein and starring Kellie Martin as Jennie/Janie. For the film, Jennie/Janie's family names were changed, the biological to "Sands" and the adoptive to "Jessmon", while Jennie's twin brothers Brendan and Brian are omitted altogether.
