= Both Sides of Time =

1995 book by Caroline B. Cooney

- Author: Caroline B. Cooney
- Language: English
- Series: Time Travelers Quartet
- Genre: Romance
- Publisher: Delacorte Books for Young Readers
- Publication date: October 9, 2001
- Publication place: United States
- Media type: Print (paperback)
- Pages: 36 pp
- ISBN: 978-0-385-72948-2
- OCLC: 49854959
- Followed by: Out of Time

Both Sides of Time (1995) is a fiction book and the first of the Time Travelers Quartet series by Caroline B. Cooney. It was first published on July 1, 1995. The hardcover book has 224 pages and was published on October 9, 2001, by Delacorte Books for Young Readers. In Both Sides of Time, Caroline B. Cooney gives a realistic view of the struggles women had faced in the 19th century and how far they have come in the 20th century. The dialogue of this novel contains a mixture of the English language from the use of speech in the Victorian era to the terminologies and style of talk in modern English. The recommended age for this book is from ages 12 to 14.

== Plot introduction ==
Annie Lockwood, a 15-year-old romanticist, who travels back in time to 1895, an age of classy parties and privileged women wearing gowns. There she meets a young man who goes by the name Strat and finds herself falling for him and his charming good looks. However conflict arises when Annie must face the reality of going back to her own time. This novel introduces readers with the situation that arises when two vastly different centuries collide and highlights the changing roles of women. The main plot of the story is that Annie Lockwood is stuck between two time periods and must decide what life she wants to live and what life fate allows her to live.

== Synopsis ==
The novel starts off with Annie Lockwood going out to meet her boyfriend Sean, whom she wants to change into a romanticist like herself by the end of the summer. Sean's nickname for Annie is ASL, based on her full name Anna Sophia Lockwood, and is an avid mechanic with his hobby being maintenance of mechanical objects such as cars. It is during the summer that Annie meets her boyfriend Sean at Stratton Point, which is being prepared for the demolition of the Stratton Mansion. Upset by the fate of the mansion, Annie explores its rooms one last time, but as she walks through the halls and rooms she feels a sudden grip on her ankles and finds herself back in time in 1895.

There she stumbles into Hiram Stratton Junior, commonly referred to as Strat, who is shocked by Annie's appearance as she is wearing a dress with no stockings on and so her legs are bare. The two immediately fall in love and Annie, stuck in 1895, is taken to live in the Stratton Mansion where she meets his father, stepmother and sister Devonny as well as Harriett, a rich but plain woman who is secretly in love with Strat.

The novel carries on in the eyes of multiple characters and how their lives have been changed with the appearance of Annie Lockwood in the 19th century and the disappearance of her in the 20th century. The main characters affected are Strat and Harriet, one of whom is in love with her and the other who is jealous. Annie Lockwood is infatuated by this century she has fallen back on, but all is not well when the murder of Mathew, a servant at the mansion, is discovered. It discovered later on, however, that Mathew's death had been a cruel response to his overhearing Clarence Rowwel's, a friend of Hiram Stratton, and Harriett's chaperone Aunt Ada's devious plan to seize Harriett's money through marriage.

This plan is unconsciously assisted by Annie Lockwood who distracts Strat from Harriet's affections resulting in her agreeing to marry the odious Clarence. However justice is served when the mystery is slowly unraveled and ends with Florinda Stratton, the wife of Hiram Stratton, shooting Rowwel in a tower where he led Harriett with the intent of pushing her off of it, and displaying it as a suicide. The book ends when fate decides to take Annie Lockwood away from 1895 and Strat, back to what is possibly her own time as the book does not confirm where exactly she has been taken to.

== Setting ==
Both Sides of Time takes place in Stratton Point in 1895 which was inspired by a beach named Tod's Point, according to Caroline B. Cooney, who stated that as a child she used to live some miles away from this beach. This area had Cooney initially choose to have Mr. Tod as a villain, but further research on him changed her mind when she discovered his characteristics that opposed that of a typical villain. Therefore, the name of the setting was changed to Stratton Point, because in the book Mr. Stratton the owner is displayed as a male chauvinist with evil traits and plays the role of one of the antagonists. The novel describes Stratton point through the eyes of Annie Lockwood, who tells of a mansion that takes up much of the area, which in 1895 was home to Hiram Stratton and his daughter and son, but in her own time, it is to be torn down due to old age.

== Character ==
Annie Lockwood- Her full name is Anna Sophia Lockwood and she is the protagonist of the story. In the book she is said to have thick dark hair, and a romantic soul who feels that she was born in the wrong century.

== Reception ==
Kirkus Reviews wrote "Cooney (Driver's Ed, 1994, etc.), usually such a pro on the specifics, weakens this time travel with inattention to detail." and "Toward the end of the book she (Annie) begins to look beyond herself, making a second trip to the past to prevent a miscarriage of justice, but for readers, it's too little, too late. She deserves everything she gets." and Publishers Weekly found "this tale of time travel and romance lacks the momentum of the author's best work"

== See also ==
- Out of Time (1996)
- Prisoner of Time (1998)
- For All Time (2001)

== Sources ==
- Fantastic Fiction: Caroline B. Cooney
