= Time Travelers Quartet =

Time Travelers Quartet is a series of four young adult time-travel romance books by Caroline B. Cooney.

== Both Sides of Time ==
Both Sides of Time (1995), ISBN 0-440-21932-9, is the first in the series of the Time Travelers Quartet books by Caroline B. Cooney.

=== Plot summary ===
Annie Lockwood is watching her boyfriend, Sean, while he fixes his car, and she questions whether or not this is the right relationship for her. Then later, while she looks through the amazing Stratton Mansion she is wrenched from her time (approximately 1995) back 100 years into the past. In this past, she meets the inhabitants of the house, including a young man named Strat. Murders happen in the house, and Annie soon falls in love with Strat, and she ends up going back and forth between the two time periods, But where will she end up? And with whom?

== Out of Time ==
Out of Time (1996), ISBN 0-440-21933-7, is the sequel to Caroline B. Cooney's young adult novel Both Sides of Time.

=== Plot summary ===
Annie Lockwood is going on a school field trip to New York City one year after she has returned to her time in 1995 after meeting Strat. While in New York, she slips back one hundred years into the past, to discover her one true love, Strat, has been put into an insane asylum. Annie learns from Strat's younger sister Devonny that Strat's current predicament is because he continued to insist that Annie was real, even though she mysteriously disappeared and everyone else decided to forget her existence. Annie decides to save Strat and prove that she is real and could travel through time. Annie also learns that Strat's betrothed, his childhood friend Harriet, is suffering from consumption.

Annie disguises herself as Devonny and manages to get past obstacles that were in the way, especially Walker Walkley, Strat's former best friend and now antagonist of the book. The two reunite and narrowly escape Walkley, who plans to take over the Stratton fortune. Annie has second thoughts about Strat being with Harriet when she died, mainly because she knew Harriet loved Strat and was betrothed to him and Strat adored her. Strat later explains to Annie that she must go back to her own time, and he must stay, no matter how much they love each other. Strat says he would go to Mexico, along with his friends at the insane asylum. One of Harriet's close friends and who loved Harriet, noticed Annie getting kidnapped by Walkley, so he shoots him. Annie is then whisked back to her proper time soon afterwards.

== Prisoner of Time ==
Prisoner of Time (1998), ISBN 0-440-22019-X, is the third in a series of time-travel romances written by Caroline B. Cooney.

=== Plot summary ===
Prisoner of Time follows Strat's younger sister, Devonny, as she accidentally slips one hundred years into the future, to Annie Lockwood's time, and begins to fall in love with Annie's younger brother. This happens at both an inopportune, and an opportune time, as she was about to marry a young man whom she does not love.

Devonny is an independent minded young woman with her own ideas for business ventures. However, in a time when the role of women are to stay at home and please their husbands, Devonny soon finds herself engaged to a British noble she does not love nor respect. With the family's business and reputation hanging in the balance, Devonny agrees to marry the noble, despite how she knows he is an avoidant person and she will be dominated by her mother-in-law. In the meantime, Devonny tries to help her friend Flossie, who has fallen in love with an Italian construction worker, elope.

In the present, Todd Lockwood, Annie's brother, tries to find his own place in the world. With failed business enterprises and difficulty living up to Annie, Todd finds confidence only when he is coaching a girls' soccer team. In the past, Devonny despairs at her circumstances, with the disappearance of her brother Strat and the death of her friend Harriet, hoping that at least Flossie will find happiness. She discovers at the wedding that her father was blackmailed into ensuring Devonny would marry nobility and that the blackmailer was Aurelia Stratton, Devonny's mother who has been incarcerated and driven to desperation to ensure her own escape.

Devonny calls out to Time for help, in hopes that Strat or Annie will come to save her. Instead, she arrives in the present and meets Todd. In the modern age, she is able to find strength within herself that the women of Todd's age possess that embolden her to take action regarding her own future once she returns.

== For All Time ==
For All Time (2001), ISBN 0-440-22931-6, is the final book in Caroline B. Cooney's time-travel romance series.

=== Plot summary ===
Annie Lockwood attends the new Ancient Egypt exhibit at a museum, where she hopes to find some clue as to Strat's survival. She is thoroughly disappointed to find that Strat is not in the group picture of the Lightner archeological dig. While at the museum she meets a young man named Lockwood Stratton, who she believes is actually Strat, coming from the past to be with her. They eventually get to talking and Annie discovers that Lockwood does not know who she is. She is certain that Lockwood is indeed Strat and begs Time to allow her to stay with him. But soon Annie is pulled back in Time; she goes back too far, and ends up in Ancient Egypt. A young Egyptian girl named Renifer cares for her and she soon becomes entangled in the world of tomb-robbers and murderers. Her pale skin, blue eyes and inability to speak Egyptian earn her the nickname "girl of ivory". When Renifer's family gets involved in a dangerous situation both Annie and Renifer wind up being offered as a sacrifice to the dead queen Hetepheres.

Meanwhile, back in the late 1800s, Strat is in Egypt working at the Lightner dig- as a photographer. But in the sands he begins to see mirages of Annie Lockwood. He feels her presence often and especially when he finds a golden sandal hidden in a small tomb. He also finds himself at the hands of his father once again when a private detective comes looking for him.

Strat is pulled back in time, and saves Annie from being buried alive. Their reunion is very short, and although Strat screams marriage proposals to the wind and runs after Annie, she still slips through Time. To her dismay, Annie goes back to the present (1999) where she meets again with the young man named Lockwood Stratton. She is very upset to have been separated once again from Strat, but Lockwood Stratton reveals that he's been looking for her all afternoon and tells her about a dream he's just had while sitting on a bench: in it, Lockwood was traveling the Nile river with British soldiers. He merely finds the dream curious, but Annie sees the real potential: could it be that Lockwood is really somehow Strat? Lockwood notices that his watch no longer works and as he is about to throw it away Annie asks to keep it, because she can see the reason the watch no longer works- it's full of sand.

On the ending of the series the author has said: "[...]sadly, the publishers wanted a quartet and they didn't want anything more, so there won't be another [...]. The ambiguous ending in book 4 was because I hoped it would convince the publishers that we needed book 5. I would have written it differently if I had had complete certainty that it was the last paragraph ever. So yes, we'll say that Lockwood is Strat."

== Sources ==
- Fantastic Fiction: Caroline B. Cooney
