= Prisoner of Time =

1998 book by Caroline B. Cooney

- Author: Caroline B. Cooney
- Language: English
- Series: Time Travelers Quartet
- Genre: Romance novel
- Publisher: Delacorte Books for Young Readers
- Publication date: 1998
- Publication place: United States
- Media type: Print (Hardcover, Paperback)
- OCLC: 49854959
- Preceded by: Out of Time
- Followed by: For All Time

Prisoner of Time (1998) is the third in a series of time-travel romances written by Caroline B. Cooney. Scholastic recommends this book for grades 6 to 8.

== Plot ==
Prisoner of Time follows Strat's younger sister, Devonny, as she accidentally slips one hundred years into the future, to Annie Lockwood's time, and begins to fall in love with Annie's younger brother. This happens at both an inopportune, and an opportune time, as she was about to marry a young man whom she does not love.

Devonny is an independent minded young woman with her own ideas for business ventures. However, in a time when the role of women are to stay at home and please their husbands, Devonny soon finds herself engaged to Lord Hugh-David, a British noble she does not love nor respect. With the family's business and reputation hanging in the balance, Devonny agrees to marry the noble, despite how she knows he is an avoidant person and she will be dominated by her mother-in-law. In the meantime, Devonny tries to help her friend Flossie, who has fallen in love with an Italian construction worker and wants to elope.

In the present, Tod Lockwood, Annie's brother, tries to find his own place in the world. With failed business enterprises and difficulty living up to Annie, Tod finds confidence only when he is coaching a girls' soccer team. In the past, Devonny despairs at her circumstances, with the disappearance of her brother Strat and the death of her friend Harriet, hoping that at least Flossie will find happiness. She discovers at the wedding that her father was blackmailed into ensuring Devonny would marry nobility and that the blackmailer was Aurelia Stratton, Devonny's mother who has been incarcerated and driven to desperation to ensure her own escape.

Devonny calls out to Time for help, in hopes that Strat or Annie will come to save her. Instead, she arrives in the present and meets Tod. In the modern age, she is able to find strength within herself that the women of Todd's age possess that embolden her to take action regarding her own future once she returns. Meanwhile, Hugh-David learns to stand up for himself when he begins to search for Devonny and comes to love her after learning what kind of woman she truly is. When Devonny returns at last, she finds the circumstances now favour her to choose her own path for the future.

== See also ==
- Both Sides of Time
- Out of Time
