= Mary Ellen Trainor =

American actress (1952–2015)

- Born: July 8, 1952; Chicago, Illinois, U.S.
- Died: May 20, 2015 (aged 62); Montecito, California, U.S.
- Occupation: Actress
- Years active: 1979–2007
- Spouse: Robert Zemeckis (m. 1980; div. 2000)
- Children: 1

Mary Ellen Trainor (July 8, 1952 – May 20, 2015) was an American character actress best known for her roles as Irene Walsh in The Goonies, LAPD psychiatrist Dr. Stephanie Woods in the Lethal Weapon films, and newscaster Gail Wallens in Die Hard and Ricochet.

== Life and career ==
Trainor attended San Diego State University, where she studied broadcast journalism. She began her career working at radio stations KSDO as well as KCBS. Her first television appearance came in the 1983 Cheers episode "Father Knows Last", and her big-screen debut came the following year in Romancing the Stone (1984).

Trainor became best known for her roles as Irene Walsh in The Goonies (1985), LAPD psychiatrist Dr. Stephanie Woods in the Lethal Weapon films (1987-1998), and newscaster Gail Wallens in both Die Hard (1988) and Ricochet (1991). She appeared in other well-known films including The Monster Squad (1987), Scrooged (1988), Ghostbusters II (1989), Death Becomes Her (1992), Forrest Gump (1994), Congo (1995), and Freaky Friday (2003). She had recurring television roles as Judy Lewis in Parker Lewis Can't Lose (Pilot 1990; 1991–1993), as Eve Lukens in Relativity (1996–1997), and as Diane Evans in Roswell (1999–2002).

Three of the films in which she appeared were selected for the National Film Registry by the Library of Congress as being "culturally, historically or aesthetically" significant: The Goonies (1985), Die Hard (1988) and Forrest Gump (1994).

== Marriage ==
Trainor was married to director Robert Zemeckis for 20 years until their divorce in 2000. The couple had a son, Alexander.

== Death ==
Trainor died aged 62, on May 20, 2015, at her home in Montecito, California from pancreatic cancer..

== Filmography ==
=== Film ===
Year	Title	Role	Notes
1984	Romancing the Stone	Elaine Wilder	
1984	The Stone Boy	Doris Simms	
1985	The Goonies	Mrs. Walsh	
1987	Lethal Weapon	Dr. Stephanie Woods	
1987	The Monster Squad	Emily Crenshaw	
1988	Action Jackson	Liz Massetori, Secretary	
1988	Die Hard	Gail Wallens	
1988	Scrooged	Ted	
1989	Ghostbusters II	Brownstone Mother	
1989	Lethal Weapon 2	Dr. Stephanie Woods	
1989	Back to the Future Part II	Officer Reese	uncredited
1990	Fire Birds	Janet Little	
1991	Ricochet	Gail Wallens	
1991	Grand Canyon	Ms. Green	
1992	Kuffs	Nikki Allyn	
1992	Lethal Weapon 3	Dr. Stephanie Woods	
1992	Death Becomes Her	Vivian Adams	
1994	Greedy	Nora McTeague	
1994	Forrest Gump	Jenny's Babysitter	uncredited
1994	Little Giants	Karen O'Shea	
1995	Congo	Moira	
1996	Executive Decision	Allison, Flight Attendant	
1998	Lethal Weapon 4	Dr. Stephanie Woods	
1999	Anywhere but Here	Homeowner	
2001	Amy's Orgasm	Amy's Mom	
2002	Moonlight Mile	Mrs. Meyerson	
2003	Freaky Friday	Diary Reading Patient	
2005	The Music Inside	Monica Amado	
2007	Cake: A Wedding Story	Jane Andrews	Final film role

=== Television ===
Year	Title	Role	Notes
1983	Cheers	Mary	Episode: "Father Knows Last"
1985	Crazy Like a Fox	Connie Olsen	Episode: "Fox and Hounds"
1986	CBS Schoolbreak Special	Helen Dawson	Episode: "The Drug Knot"
1986–1987	Remington Steele	Estelle Becker	3 episodes
1987	Amazing Stories	Mara Webster	Episode: "Moving Day"
1989	Tales from the Crypt	Wife	Episode: "And All Through the House"
1989	Fear Stalk	Jennifer	TV movie
1990	Rock Hudson	Female Agent	Television film
1990	The Outsiders	Unknown	Episode: "The Stork Club"
1990–1993	Parker Lewis Can't Lose	Mrs. Lewis	16 episodes
1995	Seduced and Betrayed	Charlotte	Television film
1996	A Face to Die For	Mrs. Gilmore	Television film
1996–1997	Relativity	Eve Lukens	17 episodes
1997	Hope	Maize Burns	Television film
1998	Someone to Love Me	Jocelyn Hart	Television film
1999–2002	Roswell	Diane Evans	23 episodes
2006 or 2008 (Note: Some sources and databases list first airdate in 2006, others in 2008)	McBride: Requiem	Elizabeth Lucas	Television film (final television role)
