= The Face on the Milk Carton (film) =

1995 American made-for-television film

- Title card
- Genre: Drama
- Based on: The Face on the Milk Carton by Caroline B. Cooney
- Written by: Nancy Isaak
- Directed by: Waris Hussein
- Starring: Kellie Martin; Sharon Lawrence; Jill Clayburgh; Edward Herrmann; Richard Masur
- Theme music composer: Leonard Rosenman

Production
- Executive producer: Dorothea G. Petrie
- Producer: Robert Silberling
- Cinematography: Robert Steadman
- Editor: Charles Bornstein
- Running time: 87 minutes
- Production companies: Dorothea G. Petrie Productions; Family Productions; Libra Pictures

Original release
- Network: CBS
- Release: May 24, 1995

The Face on the Milk Carton is a 1995 American made for television drama film based on Caroline B. Cooney’s 1990 novel of the same name. The movie stars Kellie Martin as Janie Jessmon, born Jennifer Sands, a sixteen-year-old girl who finds her face on the back of a milk carton and puts the pieces of her past together.

== Plot ==
Janie Jessmon is 16 and living a happy life. She has great parents named Miranda and Frank Jessmon and best friend named Sarah Charlotte. Then her world is shattered when she spots a picture of three-year-old missing child Jennifer Sands, whom she recognizes as herself, on Sarah Charlotte's milk carton. Janie searches the attic where she finds a trunk containing items from a girl named "Hannah". When Janie confronts her parents about the fact that she has no baby photos, they admit that they are her grandparents and that Hannah is her real mother. They tell her that Hannah was involved in a cult and showed up at their door one day with three-year-old Janie in tow.

Unable to escape the thought that her parents could have kidnapped her, Janie and her friend Reeve track down the Sands family and realize she has exactly the same red hair as every member of their family.

Janie tells Hannah's parents what she's learned, showing them the milk carton. They believe that Hannah may have kidnapped Janie and posed her as her own child. Janie is quickly reunited with her biological parents, Jonathan and Sada Sands, and her older brother Stephen and younger sister Jodie. Neither Jodie nor Stephen is exactly thrilled.

When Janie decides to run away back to the Jessmons, Stephen tracks her down at a bus station and tells her when they were little, they had been at a shoe store with their mother and Stephen was supposed to watch her, but didn't, which is why Hannah took her. Janie says she forgives him.

Janie still decides to return to her adoptive parents. Her father Jonathan, though sad, accepts this while Jodie and Stephen don't. However, Janie tells Jodie they are still and always will be sisters. As Sada and Janie are driving back to the Jessmons, she tells her about the day at the shoe store, and Janie says she's sorry she was bad. As Janie leaves with Frank Jessmon into their house, Sada Sands comes face to face with Miranda Jessmon, who extends her hand to her warmly.

== Cast ==
- Kellie Martin as Jennifer Sands/Janie Jessmon
- Sharon Lawrence as Sada Sands
- Edward Herrmann as Frank (Javenson) Jessmon
- Richard Masur as Jonathan Sands
- Johnny Green as Reeve Shields
- Jill Clayburgh as Miranda (Javenson) Jessmon
- Kristoffer Ryan Winters as Stephen Sands
- Caroline Perryclear as Jodie Sands
- Joanna Canton as Sarah Charlotte
- Lori Lindberg as Mrs. Shields
- Ellen Seltz as Lizzie Shields
- Richard K. Olsen as L. McDonnell
- Adam Sherengos as young Stephen Sands

== See also ==
- Abduction, a 2011 film with a similar premise.
- Do You Know Me, a 2009 TV movie with a similar premise, notably the main character also learns she was kidnapped after recognizing her face on a milk carton.
- The Deep End of the Ocean, a 1999 film with similar premise, based on the 1996 novel of the same name.
- Finding Carter, a 2014 MTV show with a similar premise.
