= Ricochet (1991 film) =

1991 film directed by Russell Mulcahy

- Theatrical release poster
- Directed by: Russell Mulcahy
- Screenplay by: Steven E. de Souza
- Story by: Fred Dekker; Menno Meyjes
- Produced by: Michael Levy; Joel Silver
- Starring: Denzel Washington; John Lithgow; Ice-T; Kevin Pollak
- Cinematography: Peter Levy
- Edited by: Peter Honess
- Music by: Alan Silvestri
- Production companies: HBO; Silver Pictures; Cinema Plus L.P. Indigo Productions
- Distributed by: Warner Bros. (United States and Canada); The Summit Group (International)
- Release date: October 4, 1991
- Running time: 102 minutes
- Country: United States
- Language: English
- Budget: $19 million
- Box office: $21.8 million

Ricochet is a 1991 American action thriller film directed by Russell Mulcahy, written by Steven E. de Souza, and starring Denzel Washington, John Lithgow, Ice-T, Kevin Pollak, and Lindsay Wagner, with Mary Ellen Trainor reprising her role as Gail Wallens from Die Hard. The film details a struggle between a Los Angeles district attorney (Washington) and a vengeful criminal hitman (Lithgow) whom he arrested when he was a cop.

== Plot ==
In 1983, rookie LAPD officer and law student Nick Styles meets Alice and drifts away from childhood friend Odessa, who has become a drug dealer in South Central Los Angeles. Styles and his partner Larry Doyle patrol a carnival, where they encounter hitman Earl Talbot Blake and his accomplice, Kim. Styles is forced into an armed standoff when Blake takes a hostage after killing several drug dealers. After stripping off his equipment and uniform, Styles uses a gun hidden in his athletic supporter, shooting Blake in the knee and subduing him. The incident is caught on camera by an amateur videographer and televised, making Styles a hero. He and Doyle are promoted to Detective, while Blake and Kim are sent to prison.

Eight years later, Styles has become an Assistant District Attorney and is married to Alice with two daughters. Behind bars, Blake allies himself with the Aryan Brotherhood to plot an escape and take revenge against Styles. Kim is paroled and assists in Blake's escape. Blake and the Brotherhood members stage a violent and deadly prison escape during a parole hearing, which only Blake and Brotherhood leader Jesse Schultzman survive. Afterwards, Blake murders Schultzman and burns his corpse; while in prison, he had swapped their dental records in order to fake his own death and ensure authorities would believe that Blake had died in the fire.

Styles finds Odessa, now a major drug dealer, and pleads with him to cease dealing to children. Blake and Kim kill city councilman U.B. Farris, a colleague of Styles, dressing his body in drag, planting child pornography in his briefcase and staging his death to look like a suicide, framing Styles for embezzling city funds. Blake and Kim abduct Styles outside his home and hold him hostage in an empty swimming pool for several days. Blake engages Styles in arm wrestling and then repeatedly injects him with heroin and cocaine. He then hires Wanda, a prostitute, to have sex with Styles while he is impaired with the drugs. She ignores the weakened Styles' objections and rapes him as Blake records the incident on video. After Blake and Kim deposit an unconscious Styles on the steps of City Hall, Alice overhears Styles' superiors telling him he has tested positive for gonorrhea and believes he is cheating on her.

Styles witnesses a video of Blake entering his daughters' room with a hatchet. He heads to the park where his family is watching a circus act and holds a black-clad figure he believes to be Blake at gunpoint. The figure turns out to be a clown, making Styles seem unstable. Blake releases the recording of Styles' rape, making it appear as if Styles is soliciting prostitutes and causing District Attorney Priscilla Brimleigh to suspend him.

With Styles determined to get his name cleared, he and Doyle beat information out of one of Blake's former allies in the Aryan Brotherhood. In an alley, Blake fatally shoots Doyle and plants Styles' fingerprints on the gun. Desperate, Styles contacts Odessa for help, bringing his family to the tenement building Odessa uses as a drug lab and placing them in Odessa's care. On the roof, Styles raves to the street below, apparently suicidal. This draws out Blake, who wants Styles to live a long, miserable life. Styles fakes his own death by blowing up Odessa's drug lab, secretly escaping the blast through a clothing chute as Blake watches in horror.

Odessa's gang abduct Kim, and Odessa sends a message to Blake that Styles is alive and intends to find him, challenging him to come to the Watts Towers. When Blake arrives, he finds Kim tied to the scaffolding and kills him in a fit of rage. Styles taunts Blake as the media descends on the scene and captures the two men fighting atop the towers, thus exonerating Styles. Eventually, Odessa applies electricity to the metal tower, electrocuting Blake, before Styles throws Blake off the tower to his death.

Styles reunites with his family and invites Odessa to play basketball with him again, an offer Odessa accepts before driving away. When a newscaster asks Styles for comment on the events, he switches the TV camera off.

== Cast ==
- Denzel Washington as Assistant District Attorney Nick Styles
- John Lithgow as Earl Talbot Blake
- Ice-T as Odessa
- Kevin Pollak as Lieutenant Larry Doyle
- Lindsay Wagner as District Attorney Priscilla "The Hun" Brimleigh
- Josh Evans as "Kim" Kimble
- Mary Ellen Trainor as Gail Wallens
- Linda Dona as Wanda
- Victoria Dillard as Alice Styles
- John Amos as Reverend Styles
- Matt Landers as Chief Elliott Floyd
- Sherman Howard as Public Defender Kiley
- Starletta DuPois as Mrs. Styles
- Miguel Sandoval as Vargas
- Rick Cramer as Jesse Schultzman
- Jesse Ventura as Jake Chewalski

== Production ==
Originally, the screenplay to Ricochet by Fred Dekker was written as a Dirty Harry film, but Clint Eastwood deemed it too grim. When the script was attached to Joel Silver as producer in a different direction, Dekker met Kurt Russell about starring while Dekker was to be director, which it never was able to reach in its pre-production stage.

Filming began on January 28, 1991, on various locations in Los Angeles, California.

Reportedly, violent scenes in the film were heavily cut down following test screenings. Director Russell Mulcahy said that in one deleted scene, Blake physically abuses Styles until Styles vomits, and Blake gets a sponge to clean him up, explaining why Styles had vomit on him when he is found in the streets in a later scene.

== Music ==
The score of the film was composed, produced, and conducted by Alan Silvestri, and was performed by the Skywalker Symphony Orchestra. The score album included an unheard alternate fanfare cue for the Silver Pictures logo, composed by Silvestri.

Ice-T's song "Ricochet" was released by Warner Bros. as a separate single. The song was originally recorded for the album Home Invasion, but was removed following earlier controversies concerning his lyrics. After his departure from Warner Bros. for Priority Records, it was later included as part of a bonus CD packaged with copies of Home Invasion.

== Reception ==
On review aggregation website Rotten Tomatoes, the film has a score of 75% based on 20 reviews, with an average rating of 5.9/10. On Metacritic, the film has a weighted average score of 49 based on 17 critics, indicating "mixed or average reviews". Audiences polled by CinemaScore gave the film an average grade of "B" on an A+ to F scale.

On IMDb the film attained a weighted rating of 6.2/10, leading to generally mixed reviews.

On Letterboxd, ratings for the film overall were at 3.3/5 showing a mixed reception for the film.

Gene Siskel and Roger Ebert gave the film two thumbs down on their show At the Movies, describing it as ridiculous, goofy, embarrassing, unsavory and distasteful but also stylish, ambitious and having some smart dialogue.

Kevin Thomas from Los Angeles Times, noted that the film was "exploitation-picture violent" but "genuinely scary, suspenseful and disturbing in the best sense."

=== Box office ===
The movie had a modest box office. It premiered on October 4, 1991, making $4,831,181 in its opening weekend, 2nd behind The Fisher King, ending up grossing over $21 million in its theatrical run, narrowly breaking even.
