= Angela Bonavoglia =

Writer and journalist

- Education: New York University (MSW)
- Writing career
- Notable work: The Choices We Made (1991)
- Website: angelabonavoglia.com

Angela Bonavoglia is a writer and journalist. The focus of her journalism is women's issues, mainly focusing on health, religion and social issues. She has been known to express her journalism through different mediums such as writing, film, television and even dance.

She is best known for her 1991 book, The Choices We Made. The work analyzed seven decades worth of history of women who has abortions. Within this book there are also accounts from multiple high profile people and celebrities expressing their experiences with illegal and legal abortions. Because of the work she has had the opportunity to broadcast her cause among numerous platforms such as Oprah, and the Leonard Lopate Show. She also has written another work called Good Catholic Girls: How Women are Leading the Fight to Change the Church. focusing on the advancement of women within the Catholic Church and the progress that has been made within the reform she has backed throughout her career.

in 2002, Angela wrote a story titled "The Church's Tug of War" The focus of the article was for reform within the Catholic church. Angela called for the reform after a wave of sexual abuse claims came from clergy members within the faith. While doing so this article also shined a new light up on the role of women within the church as well as the calling of the reform.

In 2005, Bishop Arthur J. Serratelli banned Bonavoglia from speaking at a Catholic retreat, based on her outspokenness of sex crimes in the Catholic Church.

Bonoglovia is known for her strategizing, communication and her development skills. She has worked as a consultant for multiple foundations. Some of these include Planned Parenthood, the Ford Foundation, the Ms. Foundation for Women, the Coalition of 100 Black Women, the International Womens Health Coalition, The New York Community Trust, the Edna McConnell Clark Foundation, Women and Philanthropy, The White House Project, the New York City Health Department, and has been an associate with the Geoffrey Knox Associates as of recent. The work she has done through them has influenced other organizations such as the Guttmacher Institute, Physicians for Reproductive Health, Gynuity Health Projects, and the International Trachoma Initiative.

Bonavoglia earned a Master of Social Work from New York University.

== Bibliography ==
- The Choices We Made: 25 Women and Men Speak Out about Abortion. Random House. 1991. ISBN 978-0-394-58463-8.
- Good Catholic Girls: How Women Are Leading the Fight to Change the Church. Regan Books. 2005. ISBN 0-06-057061-X.
