= Lorna Luft =

American actress and singer (born 1952)

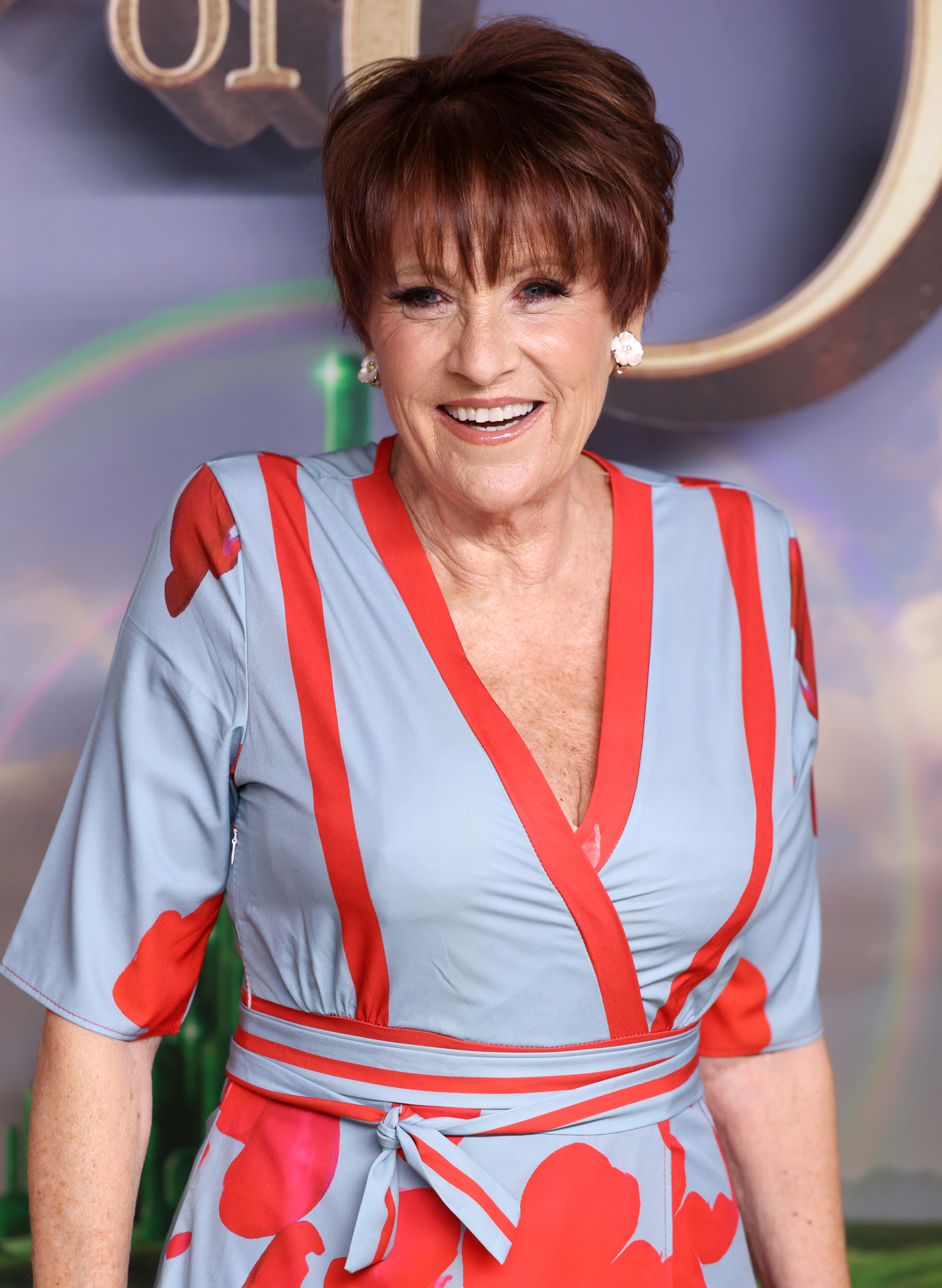
- Luft in 2025
- Born: November 21, 1952 (age 73); Santa Monica, California, U.S.
- Education: HB Studio
- Occupations: Actress, singer, author
- Years active: 1963–present
- Spouses: Jake Hooker (m. 1977; div. 1993); Colin Freeman (m. 1996)
- Children: 2
- Parents: Sidney Luft; Judy Garland
- Relatives: Liza Minnelli (half-sister)

Lorna Luft (born November 21, 1952) is an American actress and singer. She is the daughter of Judy Garland and Sidney Luft, the sister of Joey Luft and the half-sister of Liza Minnelli.

== Early life ==
Luft was born on November 21, 1952, at Saint John's Health Center in Santa Monica, California to Judy Garland and Garland's third husband, Sidney Luft. She attended University High School in Los Angeles during her senior year and was a member of the school choir. She studied theatre at HB Studio in New York City.

== Career ==
=== Stage and television ===
Luft made her show business debut at age 11, singing "Santa Claus Is Coming to Town" on the 1963 Christmas episode of Garland's CBS television series The Judy Garland Show. Siblings Liza Minnelli and Joey Luft also appeared. Garland sang the song "Lorna" to Luft on episode 19 of The Judy Garland Show in 1964: an original number composed by Mort Lindsey and Johnny Mercer especially for Luft at Garland's request. The song was later featured on the 2006 Garland compilation Great Day! Rare Recordings from the Judy Garland Show.

Luft soon joined the family act on a summer concert tour, the highlight of which was Garland's third and final appearance at New York's famed Palace Theatre on Broadway in 1967, two years before her mother's death. In this month-long engagement, Garland "shared" the bill with Luft (then 14 years old) and Joey (12 years old). The show was recorded live and released on ABC Records as Judy Garland at Home at the Palace.

Luft made her Broadway debut in 1971 at the Shubert Theatre as a replacement cast member in the musical Promises, Promises, adapted from the classic 1960 Billy Wilder film The Apartment. It is best known for the hit song "I'll Never Fall in Love Again".

On October 7, 1981, Luft performed at Carnegie Hall in New York, which was said to be the culmination of a lifelong dream. She starred in the 1981–82 national tour of They're Playing Our Song, and in 1982 she played Paulette Rebchuck in Grease 2. In 1983, she played Peppermint Patty in the off-Broadway production of Snoopy! The Musical, a sequel to You're a Good Man, Charlie Brown. Later that year, she costarred in Extremities with Farrah Fawcett.

Luft appeared as Nurse Libby Kegler on the CBS television series Trapper John, M.D. during its final season of 1985–1986. She also appeared as Patti Bristol in "Broadway Malady", a 1985 episode of Murder, She Wrote. In the episode, Luft played the daughter of Vivian Blaine, who had originated the role of Adelaide in Guys and Dolls on Broadway, while Luft would go on to play the same role in the 1992–1994 national and worldwide tours.

In 1996, Luft appeared in a production of Follies in Dublin with Mary Millar, Alex Sharpe, Christine Scarry, Aidan Conway, Enda Markey, Dave Willetts and Millicent Martin. In 2002, she starred as Mama Rose in a University of Richmond school production of Gypsy.

In December 1995, Luft released a cover version of "Have Yourself a Merry Little Christmas", which was reworked as a "virtual duet" with Garland. Produced by Gordon Lorenz, it was issued as a CD single only in the U.K. by the Carlton Sounds label. A music video featured Luft performing the song in a studio interspersed with classic footage of Garland singing to a then-11-year-old Luft on the 1963 Christmas episode of The Judy Garland Show, all placed on the same screen.

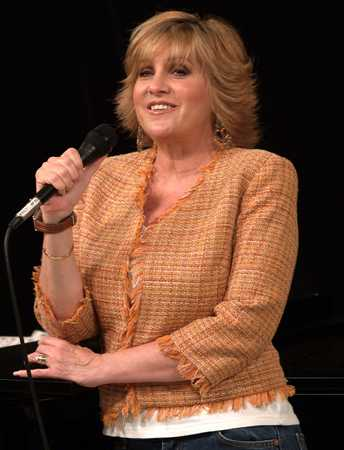
Luft in 2007

From November 2006 through January 2007, Luft performed in the U.K. premiere tour of Irving Berlin's White Christmas: The Musical, a stage adaptation of the 1954 film. She reprised her role the following year, playing the Edinburgh Playhouse from November 19 to December 8, 2007, and the Wales Millennium Centre's Donald Gordon Theatre from December 13, 2007, through January 12, 2008.

Luft appeared in four episodes of the 2007–2009 Logo animated series Rick & Steve: The Happiest Gay Couple in All the World.

In October 2007, Luft released her debut album Lorna Luft: Songs My Mother Taught Me in the U.K. Produced by Barry Manilow and Luft's husband Colin R. Freeman, the album celebrates Garland's music. In 2005, Luft toured Ireland with her stage show "Songs My Mother Taught Me". In June 2006, she surprised audiences at Carnegie Hall by performing a duet with Rufus Wainwright on the song "After You've Gone" at the conclusion of Wainwright's tribute concert commemorating Judy Garland's 1961 comeback performance at the venue.

Luft appeared in The Wizard Of Oz, a stage version of the movie that made Garland famous, at The Lowry in Manchester, England. She portrayed the role of the Wicked Witch of the West.

In April 2009, Luft completed a successful U.K. tour of the Hugh Whitemore play Pack of Lies, where she played the role of Helen Kroger, starring alongside Jenny Seagrove, Simon Shepherd, and Daniel Hill. In May 2009 she appeared in W magazine as a special guest performer for the acclaimed avant-garde Theo Adams Company's latest project, "Performance", photographed by David Sims. In July 2009, she appeared at the Mermaid Theatre, London to record for the radio series Friday Night Is Music Night. Lorna Luft and Friends – A Tribute to Judy Garland also featured John Barrowman, Frances Ruffelle, and Linzi Hateley.

Between May and July 2015, Luft toured the U.K. in Judy - The Songbook of Judy Garland, a show highlighting Garland's life and music. The show featured her signature songs and recreations of film scenes from her MGM years.

=== Film ===
Luft has appeared in the films Grease 2 (1982), Where the Boys Are '84 (1984), Fear Stalk (1989), 54 (1998) and My Giant (1998). She and her brother Joey made cameo appearances in the 1963 film I Could Go On Singing.

=== Author ===
Luft is the author of the 1998 book Me and My Shadows: A Family Memoir. Among its revelations is the fact that she had an affair with Barry Manilow in 1971. In 2001, the book was adapted as an Emmy-winning TV miniseries titled Life with Judy Garland: Me and My Shadows. It stars Judy Davis as the adult Judy, Tammy Blanchard as the teenage Judy, Hugh Laurie as Vincente Minnelli, Victor Garber as Sid Luft, and Marsha Mason as Ethel Gumm. Luft is the co-author, along with film historian Jeffrey Vance, of the 2018 book A Star Is Born: Judy Garland and the Film That Got Away, which she states is "a vivid account of the film classic's production, loss, and reclamation."

== Personal life ==
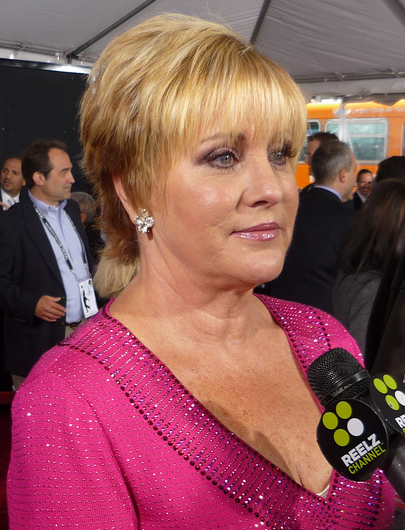
Luft in 2010

Luft participates in events which are held by various children's and AIDS-related charities, including the annual Los Angeles AIDS Walk and The Children's Wish Foundation International. Luft and her first husband Jerry Mamberg, also known as Jake Hooker, divorced in 1993. They had two children together, a son, Jesse, a daughter, Vanessa, and have four grandchildren. She currently resides in Palm Springs, California, with her second husband, the British-born composer and arranger, Colin Freeman.

== Health ==
Luft was diagnosed with breast cancer in 2012 and she finished her last chemotherapy treatment in 2013. Two years later, the U.K. tour of Judy - The Songbook of Judy Garland concluded early on July 11, 2015, and she returned to the U.S. for surgical treatment following a re-emergence of the breast cancer.

In March 2018, Luft was diagnosed with a brain tumor after she collapsed following a performance in London. Later that month, Luft underwent successful surgery to remove the tumor.

== Discography ==
=== Studio albums ===
Year	Album	Label
2007	Songs My Mother Taught Me	First Night Records

=== Singles ===
Year	Single	Label
1973	"Our Day Will Come" b/w "Is It Really Love At All"	Epic
1978	"Head Over Heels" b/w "I Did It All For Love"	Private Stock
1981	"Long Time" b/w "Something's Got A Hold On My Heart"	DJM Records
1981	"Get It Up" b/w "A Few Dollars More"	Silver Blue Records
1984	"Where the Boys Are" (with Village People) b/w "Prove Me Wrong"	Silver Blue Records
1984	"The Whole World's Goin' Crazee" b/w "Jesse's Theme"	Silver Blue Records
1989	"Born Again" b/w "Born Again (instrumental)"	Dessca Records
1995	"Have Yourself a Merry Little Christmas" (with Judy Garland)	Carlton Sounds
2011	"When You Wish Upon a Star"	Silver Blue Records

=== Soundtracks ===
Year	Album	Label	Songs
1982	Grease 2: Original Soundtrack Recording	RSO	"Score Tonight"; "Girl for All Seasons"; "Who's That Guy?"; "Reproduction"; "Rock-A-Hula-Luau (Summer Is Coming)"; "We'll Be Together"
1990	Girl Crazy (cast soundtrack)	Elektra	"Sam and Delilah"; "I Got Rhythm"; "I Got Rhythm" (Encore) (with Dick Hyman); "Finale: Act I"; "Boy! What Love Has Done to Me!"

=== Album appearances ===
Year	Song(s)	Role	Album / Label
1967	"Bob White (Whatcha Gonna Swing Tonight?)" with Judy Garland	Lead vocal	Judy Garland at Home at the Palace: Opening Night / ABC
1967	"Jamboree Jones"	Lead vocal	Judy Garland at Home at the Palace: Opening Night / ABC
1967	"Together (Wherever We Go)"	Lead vocal	Judy Garland at Home at the Palace: Opening Night / ABC
1979	"Accidents Never Happen" with Blondie	Back vocal	Eat to the Beat / Chrysalis
1979	"Slow Motion"	Back vocal	Eat to the Beat / Chrysalis
1980	[Several tracks] with Hilly Michaels	Back vocal	Calling All Girls / Warner Bros.
1984	[Several tracks] with Adrian Zmed	Back vocal	Adrian Zmed / Attic Records
1991	"A Gift of Hope"	Lead vocal	The Christmas Album... A Gift of Hope / Children's Records
1992	"Blow, Gabriel, Blow"	Lead vocal	Cole Porter: Centennial Gala Concert / Teldec
1996	"Not Even Nominated" (Medley)	Lead vocal	Stairway to the Stars / First Night Records
1998	[Several tracks] with Rick Derringer	Back vocal	Rick Derringer & Friends / King Biscuit Flower Hour
2007	"After You've Gone" with Rufus Wainwright	Lead vocal	Rufus Does Judy at Carnegie Hall / Geffen
2011	"You're Nobody till Somebody Loves You" with Matt Dusk	Lead vocal	Matt Dusk: Live from Las Vegas / Royal Crown Records
2019	"Santa Claus Is Coming to Town" with Randy Rainbow	Lead vocal	Hey Gurl, It's Christmas! / Broadway Records

=== DVD releases ===
Year	Title	Label
2002	Life with Judy Garland: Me and My Shadows	Buena Vista
2002	Judy Garland: The Concert Years	Kultur Video
2006	Jerry Herman's Broadway at the Hollywood Bowl	Image Entertainment
2007	Rufus! Rufus! Rufus! Does Judy! Judy! Judy!: Live from the London Palladium	Geffen
2009	Lorna Luft: Live in Oz	Ovation

== Filmography ==
=== Film ===
Year	Title	Role	Notes
1963	I Could Go On Singing	Girl on Boat	Uncredited
1982	Grease 2	Paulette Rebchuck	
1984	Where the Boys Are '84	Carole Singer	
1989	Fear Stalk	Doris	Television film
1998	My Giant	Joanne	
1998	54	Elaine's Patron	
2017	The Fabulous Allan Carr	Herself – Interview	Documentary
2024	Liza: A Truly Terrific Absolutely True Story	Herself – Interview	Documentary

=== Television ===
Year	Title	Role	Notes
1973	Love, American Style	Margie Currie	Segment: "Love and the Blue Plate Special"
1975	McCloud	Marlene Morgan	Episode: "Park Avenue Pirates"
1985	The Twilight Zone	Sheila Cunningham	Segment: "Children's Zoo"
1985–86	Trapper John, M.D.	Nurse Libby Kegler	Main cast, 19 episodes (Season 7)
1986	Tales from the Darkside	Christine Matthews	Episode: "The Shrine"
1988	Hooperman	Peaches Markowitz	Episode: "The Naked and the Dead"
1990	Murder, She Wrote	Patsy Dumont	Episode: "If the Shoe Fits"
1995	The Nanny	Cousin Susan Rosenberg	Episode: "The Unkindest Cut"
1995	Caroline in the City	Travel Agent Mindi	Episode: "Caroline and the Christmas Break"
2001	Life with Judy Garland: Me and My Shadows	—N/a	Miniseries; co-executive producer
2007–09	Rick & Steve: The Happiest Gay Couple in All the World	Joanna	Voice, 4 episodes
2014	Sean Saves the World	Francine	Episode: "The Wrath of Sean"

== Theatre ==
Year	Title	Role	Venue
1967	Judy Garland at Home at the Palace	Herself – Performer	Broadway: Palace Theatre
1970	The Boy Friend	Madcap Maisie	The Banff Centre, Banff, Alberta
1971–72	Promises, Promises	Fran Kubelik	Broadway: Shubert Theatre
1980	Grease	Sandy Dumbrowski	E.J. Thomas Hall, Akron, Ohio
1980	Carnival!	Lili	Club Bene Dinner Theater, South Amboy, New Jersey
1981–82	They're Playing Our Song	Sonia Walsk	US National Tour
1983	Snoopy! The Musical	Peppermint Patty	Off-Broadway: Lamb's Theatre
1983	Extremities	Terry	Off-Broadway: Westside Theatre
1986	Little Shop of Horrors	Audrey	Lobero Theatre, Santa Barbara, California
1987	The Unsinkable Molly Brown	Molly Brown	Burt Reynolds Dinner Theatre, Jupiter, Florida
1987–88	Mame	Agnes Gooch	Burt Reynolds Dinner Theatre, Jupiter, Florida
1988	Girl Crazy	Kate Fothergill	Birmingham Theatre, Detroit, Michigan
1992–94	Guys and Dolls	Miss Adelaide	North American Tour
1996	Follies	Phyllis Stone	National Concert Hall, Dublin, Ireland
2001	Caged	Female Prisoner	Town Hall, New York City
2002	Gypsy	Mama Rose	University of Richmond, Richmond, Virginia
2004	Songs My Mother Taught Me: The Music of Judy Garland	Herself	West End: Savoy Theatre (London, England)
2006–07	White Christmas	Martha Watson	UK National Tour
2007	Babes in Arms	Mrs. Phyllis Owen	Chichester Festival Theatre, Chichester, England
2007–08	White Christmas	Martha Watson	UK National Tour
2008–09	The Wizard of Oz	Wicked Witch of the West	The Lowry, Manchester, England
2009	Pack of Lies	Helen Kroger	UK National Tour
2009–10	White Christmas	Martha Watson	US National Tour
2011	White Christmas	Martha Watson	Paper Mill Playhouse, Millburn, New Jersey
2015	Follies	Hattie Walker	Royal Albert Hall, London, England
2016–17	White Christmas	Martha Watson	US National Tour
2017	Holiday Inn	Louise Badger	5th Avenue Theatre, Seattle, Washington
2019	White Christmas	Martha Watson	US National Tour
2022	White Christmas	Martha Watson	UK National Tour

== Published works ==
- Luft, Lorna (1998). Me and My Shadows: A Family Memoir. Simon & Schuster. ISBN 978-0671019006., autobiography
- Luft, Lorna; Fricke, John (2003). Judy Garland: A Portrait in Art & Anecdote. Bulfinch Press. ISBN 978-0821228364., biography
- Luft, Lorna; Vance, Jeffrey (2018). A Star Is Born: Judy Garland and the Film That Got Away. Running Press. ISBN 978-0762464807., biography
