= Fear Stalk =

- Genre: Drama; Thriller
- Written by: Ellen Weston
- Directed by: Larry Shaw
- Starring: Jill Clayburgh; Stephen Macht; Lynne Thigpen; Sandy McPeak; Mary Ellen Trainor; Lorna Luft; Sada Thompson; Cheryl Anderson
- Music by: Fred Karlin
- Country of origin: United States
- Original language: English

Production
- Producer: Donald March
- Cinematography: Neil Roach
- Editor: Millie Moore
- Running time: 95 minutes
- Production company: ITC Entertainment

Original release
- Network: CBS
- Release: December 17, 1989

Fear Stalk is a 1989 American made-for-television thriller drama film starring Jill Clayburgh and Stephen Macht. It was directed by Larry Shaw from a teleplay written by Ellen Weston and broadcast as the CBS Sunday Night Movie on December 17, 1989.

== Plot ==
Alexandra Maynard (Jill Clayburgh) is a strong-willed soap opera producer whose life is suddenly invaded by a psychopath (Andrew Divoff) after he steals all of the belongings out of her purse. Once in possession of Alexandra's identification and credit cards, her tormentor is able to follow her all over town, anticipating her every move. Adding to Alexandra's agony are threatening phone calls and money being withdrawn from her account by her ubiquitous stalker. Then, Alexandra's friends and family decide to form a united front, and the stalker finds himself the stalkee.

== Cast ==
- Jill Clayburgh as Alexandra "Ally" Maynard
- Stephen Macht as Tom Hagar
- Lynne Thigpen as Barbara
- Sandy McPeak as Richard
- Mary Ellen Trainor as Jennifer
- Lorna Luft as Doris
- Cheryl Anderson as Sandy
- Sada Thompson as Pearl
- Andrew Divoff as Man

== Filming ==
Fear Stalk was shot in Los Angeles, California from September 27 to October 20, 1989.
