= Goddess of Yesterday =

2002 novel by Caroline B. Cooney based on the Trojan War from Greek mythology

- Author: Caroline B. Cooney
- Language: English
- Publisher: Delacorte Press
- Publication date: 2002
- Publication place: United States
- Media type: Print (Hardcover, Paperback)
- Pages: 263
- ISBN: 978-0-440-22930-8

Goddess of Yesterday is a 2002 novel by Caroline B. Cooney based on the Trojan War from Greek mythology. The book was nominated for the South Carolina Junior Book Award, and was a 2003 ALA Notable Children's Book for Older Readers

== Plot ==
Anaxandra is the only daughter of Chrysaor, a chieftain who rules an uncharted island in ancient Greece. One day King Nicander of Siphnos comes and demands hostage and tribute, he takes Anaxandra to be the playmate of his daughter Callisto. Unable to return home, she comes to love the small island of Siphnos and lives there for six years with Nicander's family.

One day, ships come into Siphnos harbor and kill everyone except Anaxandra, who survives by pretending to be Medusa by wearing an octopus on her head. Found by Menelaus, king of Sparta, Anaxandra assumes the identity of Princess Callisto, believing that Menelaus will otherwise abandon her. Brought into Menelaus's household in Sparta, all the members of his family welcome her, except Menelaus's beautiful wife, Helen. Suspicious of "Callisto," Helen's animosity towards Anaxandra places her in greater danger than ever.

When Menelaus leaves for Crete to repay its king for slaves, Paris, a prince of Troy arrives to plunder Sparta's treasury and takes an eager Helen away with him. To save Helen's daughter Hermione from leaving, Anaxandra takes her place and soon becomes the sole protector of Helen's infant son, Pleisthenes. Upon arriving in Troy, Anaxandra is exposed again by Helen, who will stop at nothing to make Anaxandra suffer and neglects her own son in favour of her new life as the bride of Paris.

Helen is quickly beloved by all of Troy, save Paris's sister Cassandra. Cassandra has foreseen that Helen will destroy the city, but she is cursed so her prophecies will never be believed. In spite of her suffering, Anaxandra befriends Cassandra and Andromache, the bride of Prince Hector. When Menelaus learns that Paris has stolen Helen and the treasures of Sparta, he calls upon his brother Agamemnon and all of Helen's former suitors who have sworn to defend his honour and to declare war upon Troy.

As Helen revels in the war that will occur for her sake, Anaxandra finds herself falling in love with Euneus, the neutral king of Lemnos who is a friend of Hector. Torn between her love of Troy and her loyalty to Menelaus, Anaxandra must find a way to rescue Pleisthenes and return the young prince to his father before Troy is destroyed.

== Characters ==
- Anaxandra - The main character, described as having flowing red hair and pious towards her guardian goddess. She steals the birthright of Princess Callisto of Siphnos to survive, but finds herself the target of Queen Helen's animosity. She accompanies Helen to Troy in the place of Helen's daughter Hermione and becomes the sole protector of Helen's infant son, Pleisthenes.
- Menelaus - The king of Sparta and brother to King Agamemnon, who married Helen's sister Clytemnestra. He loves his children dearly and cares for Anaxandra as his own, which further increases Helen's discontent with Anaxandra's presence and Menelaus's lack of attention toward her. He is a generous to a fault and does not appear to be swayed by his wife's beauty.
- Helen - The queen of Sparta, the wife of Menelaus, said to be born from Zeus when he took the form of a swan to seduce Helen's mother. She is cruel and coldhearted except when she is openly adored, thus her unhappiness when Menelaus does not appear to be in thrall of her beauty. She falls in love with Paris, a prince of Troy, and revels in the war that will be waged for her sake. Though she takes her infant son Pleisthenes to Troy, she quickly forgets about him, leaving Anaxandra as the infant's only protector.
- Hermione - A princess of Sparta, daughter of Menelaus and Helen. She is Anaxandra's friend while she assumes the identity of Callisto. Anaxandra is forced to assume her identity to spare the true princess of Sparta from being abducted during Paris' betrayal of his host.
- Paris - A prince of Troy, the younger brother of Prince Hector and Princess Cassandra. He is cruel and ruthless, not caring for anyone but himself or Helen and not hesitating to perform dishonourable deeds as it suits him. Anaxandra does not trust him, knowing that he wishes to kill Helen's son Pleisthenes.
- Hector - The eldest son of King Priam and Queen Hecuba of Troy, thus Priam's heir. He is honourable and kindhearted, possessing more foresight than Paris.
- Andromache - The bride of Hector, a kind young woman of noble birth who befriends Anaxandra. She pities Cassandra and treats her kindly.
- Cassandra - A princess of Troy, said to be as beautiful as Helen. Though she is capable of seeing the future, she is cursed to never be believed, thus everyone in Troy believes her to be insane and she is left confined in a tower. She immediately knows that Anaxandra is not Callisto, but does not expose her and a friendship develops between them. Helen hates Cassandra for her prophecies, as she believes that Cassandra only appears to ruin her in her glory.
