= The Face on the Milk Carton =

1990 book by Caroline B. Cooney

- Author: Caroline B. Cooney
- Translator: English
- Cover artist: Tyler Dianne Pullara
- Language: English
- Series: The Janie Johnson series
- Genre: Young adult novel
- Publisher: "Bantam Doubleday Dell Books for Young Readers", a division of "Bantam Doubleday Dell Publishing Group. Inc."
- Publication date: 1990
- Publication place: United States
- Media type: Print (Paperback)
- Pages: 164
- ISBN: 0-316-15577-2 (first edition, paperback)
- OCLC: 54372561
- Followed by: Whatever Happened to Janie? The Voice on the Radio; What Janie Found; Janie Face to Face

The Face on the Milk Carton is a young adult mystery novel written by author Caroline B. Cooney that was first published in 1990. The first in the five-book Janie Johnson series, it was later adapted into a film for television. The book is about a 15-year-old girl named Janie Johnson, who starts to suspect that her parents may have kidnapped her and that her biological parents are somewhere in New Jersey. These suspicions come after Janie recognizes a picture of herself on a milk carton under the heading "Missing Child." Janie's life gets more stressful as she tries to find the truth while hiding the secret from her parents.

The idea for the novel originated from the regular practice in the 1980s and 1990s for milk cartons to feature photographs of missing children.

The Face on the Milk Carton, which contains themes including the exploration of self-identity, relationships with parents and peers, and individual responsibility, has been used in young adult classrooms to encourage readers to explore these themes in their own lives.

The book was number 79 on the most frequently challenged books in the US for 1990-1999 and number 29 for 2000-2009 for references to kidnapping, cults, challenges to authority, and sexual activity. The book has also received several awards, including the Colorado Blue Spruce Book Award (1996) and the Pacific Northwest Library Association Young Readers Choice Award (1993).

== Summary ==
While at lunch on a typical day of school, Janie Johnson's life is upended after she picks up a friend's milk carton and recognizes herself as the girl in a missing person photo on the back of the carton. The child is identified as ‘Jennie Spring,’ a girl who was kidnapped from a New Jersey shopping mall when she was three years old. Although Janie refuses to believe that her loving parents could have kidnapped her, she begins having flashbacks that do not fit in with her current life.

After her mother appears reluctant when she asks to see her birth certificate, Janie searches her home's attic for any information that could shed light on her flashbacks. After finding school papers with the name 'Hannah Javensen' and the dress worn by the girl on the milk carton, Janie confronts her parents.

Janie's parents explain that Hannah is their daughter, and that Janie is Hannah's daughter, making them her grandparents. According to her parents, Hannah was a confused teen who had joined a Hare Krishna style cult at a young age and was married off to one of the men in the cult. One day, Hannah showed up at the Johnsons' house with Janie, and left her there before returning to the cult. The Johnsons, fearing the cult might want Janie back, fled the state and changed their name from 'Javensen' to 'Johnson.' Janie, relieved her parents are not kidnappers, concludes that her flashbacks are from her life in the cult before coming to the Johnson's.

Despite her relief, Janie struggles to forget the picture on the milk carton and her flashbacks, and begins researching the Jennie Spring kidnapping. Discrepancies between her research and her parents' story leads her to suspect that her parents may have actually kidnapped her. Although she still loves them and wants to forgive them, Janie decides to further investigate the kidnapping. Along with her boyfriend Reeve, Janie goes to New Jersey to find the Spring family.

In New Jersey, they discover that the entire family has the same red hair that Janie has, which neither Mr. and Mrs. Johnson or even Hannah has. Unsure of what to do, Janie writes the Spring family a letter, but hesitates to mail it. She loses the letter, and worries it has been mailed by someone, which would inform the Spring family.

Janie asks her parents what to do about the letter, and confronts them with what she has learned. A shocked Mr. and Mrs. Johnson reason that Hannah must have kidnapped Janie, and insist, against Janie's wishes, that they call the Springs. The book ends with Janie calling the New Jersey family.

== Background ==
According to an interview with The Atlantic, Cooney's inspiration came to her at LaGuardia Airport, where she saw missing child flyers, including one of a toddler, posted throughout the concourse. The posters struck her, and led her to imagine what it might be like if a toddler recognized herself on a poster.

Throughout the 1980s and 1990s, it was regular practice for milk cartons to feature photographs of missing children. The practice began after a series of high-profile child kidnappings by noncustodial parents in the late 1970s led to renewed attention on law enforcement's tendency to neglect cases that involved children staying with noncustodial parents. Widespread dissatisfaction with this practice prompted a campaign for law enforcement to pursue all missing children cases more aggressively.

== Genre and style ==
The Face on the Milk Carton, similarly to many of Cooney's novels, is a young adult mystery and suspense novel. The recommended age range is 12 and up.

== Analysis ==
Authors John Bushman and Shelley McNerny, who specialize in analyzing young adult literature, recognize The Face on the Milk Carton, along with several other young adult novels, as a text that instructors can use to guide the development of young adults’ moral reasoning. This is because the novel contains a variety of themes, including the exploration of self-identity, relationships with parents and peers, and individual responsibility, that will challenge readers to examine the dynamics that the novel's protagonist faces in the context of their own lives.

In her article “Mirrors and Windows,” editor Kim Ford lists The Face on the Milk Carton as one of her thirty recommended books, as a young adult favorite, to put on a “good book” shelf. Ford further notes that many of the most popular books among young adults, including The Face on the Milk Carton, are those that are both “mirrors” and “windows,” or books that allow readers to see and understand themselves in the novels’ characters.

== Publication ==
The Face on the Milk Carton was first published in 1990 by Bantam Doubleday Dell Books for Young Readers. The last book of the series, Janie Face to Face, was published in January 2014.

== Reception ==
The Face on the Milk Carton has been the recipient of several awards, including the Colorado Blue Spruce Book Award (1996), Pacific Northwest Library Association Young Readers Choice Award (1993), and Iowa Teen Book Award (1993).

Cumulatively, the series has sold over 4.2 million copies.

The novel has also faced challenges for its mature content. The book was number 79 on the most frequently challenged books in the US for 1990-1999 and number 29 for 2000-2009 for references to kidnapping, cults, and sexual activity.

== See also ==
- Janie Johnson series
- Abduction (2011 film)
- Etan Patz - His disappearance helped spark the missing children's movement, including new legislation and various methods for tracking down missing children, such as the milk-carton campaigns of the mid-1980s. Etan was the first ever missing child to be pictured on the side of a milk carton.
- Abduction of Kamiyah Mobley
- Kidnapping of Carlina White
- Zephany Nurse
