= The Choices We Made =

1991 book on abortion

The Choices We Made: Twenty-Five Women and Men Speak Out About Abortion
- Author: Angela Bonavoglia
- Language: English
- Subject: Abortion
- Genre: Non-fiction
- Publisher: Random House, Four Walls Eight Windows
- Publication place: United States
- ISBN: 978-1568581880

The Choices We Made: Twenty-Five Women and Men Speak Out About Abortion is a book showing the abortion stories of various people in different situations and periods of time. This includes celebrities such as Anne Archer, Polly Bergen, Kay Boyle, Jill Clayburgh, Linda Ellerbee, Whoopi Goldberg, Elizabeth Janeway, Ursula Le Guin, Norma McCorvey, Rita Moreno, and Grace Paley. Their stories were collected by Angela Bonavoglia, a former executive at Planned Parenthood.

== Synopsis ==
The Choices We Made collects material from twenty-five contributors writing in support of legalized abortion. Contributors include people from all varieties of life, including celebrities and wealthy persons as well as people who have experienced extreme poverty. The material is written from the viewpoints of people who have had experiences with abortion such as seeking an abortion for themselves or by knowing someone who has been through the procedure. The age range of the contributors range from teenagers to senior citizens. Some of the contributors include Margot Kidder, Jill Clayburgh and Whoopi Goldberg, the latter of whom discusses her experiences trying to self-induce abortion using a coat hanger.

== Publication ==
The Choices We Made was first published in hardback on January 15, 1991, the 18th anniversary of Roe v. Wade, by Random House, who released it in paperback format the following year. It was re-released in 2001 in paperback format through Four Walls Eight Windows. It has since gone out of print.

== Background ==
Bonavoglia chose to create The Choices We Made as she wanted to show "the jeopardy women's health and lives are in when abortion isn't accessible" and the experiences women went through that led to their choices. She and Gloria Steinem began asking women to tell their abortion stories after Steinem expressed surprise over the number of people who were both influential and wanted abortion to remain legal while at a pro-choice march. Bonavoglia was initially concerned about the process of finding women who had abortions and were willing to discuss their stories, particularly as she would have had to begin by asking if they had received an abortion. The only people she knew for certain that had been through the procedure were the women from the preview issue of Ms. magazine, as the issue had featured the names of 53 women willing to come forward and speak about their abortion, and Bonavoglia has described the message as "the hardest letter I have ever written in my life". She reached out to people involved with reproductive rights and was met with success, as she received many phone calls from people willing to tell their stories, as well as from those who stated that they had received an abortion but were unwilling to publicly admit it out of fear of reprisal or backlash. Some of the women had never told their stories, while some of the other responses were from men who wanted to tell the stories of their family members who had received abortions.

== Reception ==
Critical reception for the book has been largely positive and the work has been compared to the Manifesto of the 343, a French petition signed by 343 women stating that they had an abortion. A journalist for The Morning Call noted that "Through the personal stories and a lengthy introduction by Bonavoglia, the reader receives a history lesson in the evolution of sexual attitudes and how they have impacted abortion rights." Publishers Weekly also reviewed the work, writing "While Bonavoglia reviews the controversial medical, political and religious aspects of abortion, she convincingly emphasizes the right and responsibility of women to decide this supremely personal matter."
