= A Naked Girl on the Appian Way =

A Naked Girl on the Appian Way is a play by Richard Greenberg, initially produced by South Coast Repertory, Costa Mesa, California, in 2005.

== Production history ==
It was commissioned by South Coast Repertory and premiered there from April 1, 2005 through May 15.

A Naked Girl on the Appian Way opened on Broadway in a Roundabout Theatre production at the American Airlines Theatre on October 6, 2005, and ran through December 4, 2005. Directed by Doug Hughes, it starred Jill Clayburgh, Richard Thomas and Matthew Morrison.

== Plot ==
Cookbook author Bess Lapin and her husband Jeffrey live in the Hamptons with their 3 adopted children. Jeffrey, newly retired, is also writing a book about the connection between business and art. Two of the children return from a European trip and the family gathers for a reunion. Neighbors Elaine and her mother-in-law Sadie crash the welcome-home party. The returned children announce that they are planning to get married.
