= Judy Garland at Home at the Palace: Opening Night =

Live album by Judy Garland
- Released: August 15, 1967
- Recorded: July/August 1967
- Venue: Palace Theatre, New York City
- Genre: Traditional pop
- Label: ABC

Judy Garland chronology
Live at the London Palladium (1965)	Judy Garland at Home at the Palace: Opening Night (1967)	Judy Garland's Greatest Hits (1969)

Judy Garland at Home at the Palace: Opening Night is the sixth live album by the American actress and singer Judy Garland. It was released on August 15, 1967, by ABC Records. The album consists of a live performance at the Palace Theatre in New York City, held by Garland. The album features an array of her best-known songs, including "Over the Rainbow", "The Trolley Song", and "The Man That Got Away". It also includes duets with Garland's children, Lorna Luft and Joey Luft.

== Background ==
Garland's connection with the Palace Theatre in New York City began in the fall of 1951 when she performed there for a four-week engagement that extended to an astonishing 19 weeks. The venue, with its 1,700-seat capacity, became a significant landmark in her career, often referred to by Garland as her professional "home".

The album captures a performance at the Palace Theatre, known for its vibrant atmosphere and Garland's heartfelt engagement with the audience. According to George Hoefer, associate editor of Jazz & Pop, the recording brings listeners into the lively environment of the concert, capturing the "electricity" in the air and the enthusiastic reactions of the audience. Hoefer noted that rarely, if ever, has a performer received such a resounding ovation within a theater. At the closing of the opening night show, the standing applause lasted for an impressive 25 minutes.

In the LP liner notes, George Hoefer, who was associate editor of the magazine Jazz & Pop, observed,

Miss Garland calls the Palace 'home'. Her love affair with the 1,700-seated house began back in the fall of 1951 when she went in for a four-week stay and remained 19 weeks. ... This record takes its listeners right into the packed house and captures not only Miss Garland's great performance, but the 'electricity' in the air, and the sounds from the audience as well. Rarely, if ever, has a performer received such a resounding ovation within the confines of a theater – at the closing of the opening night show the standing applause lasted for 25 minutes.

The singer enters the theater from the front or lobby-end of the house. As she skips down the aisle to the accompaniment of an overture made up of some of her best-known songs, her fans begin an applause policy that is reactivated between each of her subsequent songs. ...

She works with a hand microphone, a device that permits her to range the stage from one end to the other. Her performance is interspersed with a wondrous sense of showmanship evidenced by calculated pauses, kiss-throwing, short imitation dance steps, and hand gestures. Between the tunes, she answers all questions and acknowledges the protestations of love from the enthusiastic friends out front. ...

The listener will note that the show is enhanced and given a very human touch when the singer brings out her daughter Lorna and her son Joey to join her in three numbers.

== Performance ==
Garland entered the theater from the front, walking down the aisle accompanied by an overture of some of her best-known songs. Her fans maintained a continuous applause policy, reacting enthusiastically between each song. She used a hand microphone, allowing her to move freely across the stage, and her performance included calculated pauses, kiss-throwing, short imitation dance steps, and expressive hand gestures. Between songs, she interacted with the audience, answering questions and acknowledging expressions of admiration and love. The concert included the appearances of Garland's children, Lorna Luft and Joey Luft. They joined her on stage for three numbers.

== Critical reception ==
Billboard called "a memorable disk" and a "must for all Judy Garland fans". Cash Box praised the album as "an electric experience in recorded entertainment" and highlighted that songs like "I Feel A Song Coming On" and "What Now My Love" "will excite the multitudinous fans of the star". Record World elected the record as "Album of the Week" in its August 19, 1967 edition. Playbill praised Garland's performance, acknowledging her reduced vocal agility but noting that the audience's response was "a moving tribute to the love of fans". They described "I Feel a Song Coming On" as "spirited" and her rendition of "What Now My Love" as "heart wrenching", adding that "sadly" the album was "never released on CD".

== Commercial performance ==
The album peaked at number 174 on the Billboard 200 chart.

== Track listing ==
A-Side

1. Overture (Medley of "The Trolley Song" (by Hugh Martin and Ralph Blane); "Over the Rainbow" (music by Harold Arlen and lyrics by E.Y. Harburg); "The Man That Got Away" (music by Harold Arlen and lyrics by Ira Gershwin) 4:04
2. "I Feel a Song Coming On" (music by Jimmy McHugh and lyrics by Dorothy Fields and George Oppenheimer) 1:43
3. "Almost Like Being in Love" (music by Frederick Loewe and lyrics by Alan Jay Lerner); "This Can't Be Love" (music by Richard Rodgers and lyrics by Lorenz Hart) 3:09
4. Medley: "You Made Me Love You (I Didn't Want to Do It)" (music by James V. Monaco and lyrics by Joseph McCarthy); "For Me and My Gal" (by George W. Meyer, Edgar Leslie; E. Ray Goetz), and "The Trolley Song" 3:21
5. "What Now, My Love" (music by Gilbert Bécaud and original lyrics by Pierre Delanoë; English lyrics and title by Carl Sigman) 3:16

B-Side

1. "Bob White (Whatcha Gonna Swing Tonight?)" with daughter Lorna Luft (music by Bernard Hanighen and lyrics by Johnny Mercer); "Jamboree Jones" with Lorna (music by Johnny Mercer); "Together (Wherever We Go)" with Lorna and son Joey Luft (music by Jule Styne and lyrics by Stephen Sondheim); "Over the Rainbow" 5:35
2. "Ol' Man River" (music by Jerome Kern and lyrics by Oscar Hammerstein II); "That's Entertainment!" (music by Arthur Schwartz and lyrics by Howard Dietz) 5:45
3. "I Loved Him, But He Didn't Love Me" (music and lyrics by Cole Porter) 1:40
4. "Rock-a-Bye Your Baby with a Dixie Melody" (music by Jean Schwartz and lyrics by Sam M. Lewis and Joe Young); "Over the Rainbow" 4:03

== Charts ==
1967 weekly chart performance
Chart (1967)	Peak position
US Billboard 200	174
US Top 100 Albums (Cash Box)	83
US 100 Top LP's (Record World)	73
