= The Terrorist (novel) =

1997 young adult novel by Caroline B. Cooney

- Author: Caroline B. Cooney
- Language: English
- Genre: Young adult literature
- Publication date: 1997
- Publication place: United States
- Media type: Print (Hardback & Paperback)
- Pages: 397

The Terrorist is a 1997 young adult novel by Caroline B. Cooney. It deals with Laura Williams, a sixteen-year-old American who attends an international school in London. When her younger brother, Billy, is killed by a terrorist bomb handed to him by a stranger on the subway, Laura becomes obsessed with revenge. She suspects everyone, including her classmates, and wonders about their associations with such causes as the PLO or the IRA. Laura knows nothing of world politics at first, but she quickly learns that the world is a dangerous place and many nations have many enemies. The situation is complicated when an Iranian classmate named Jehran asks Laura to give her Billy's passport to help her escape an arranged marriage. This book has been frequently challenged due to its portrayal of Muslims.
