= Terrorizer (disambiguation) =

Terrorizer is an American grindcore band.

Terrorizer may also refer to:

- Terrorizer (magazine), a British extreme music magazine
- Terrorizers, a 1986 Taiwanese film
- Terrorizers (2021 film), 2021 Taiwanese film
- The Terrorizers, a secret agent novel by Donald Hamilton

== See also ==
- Terroriser
