= Jill Clayburgh =

American actress (1944–2010)

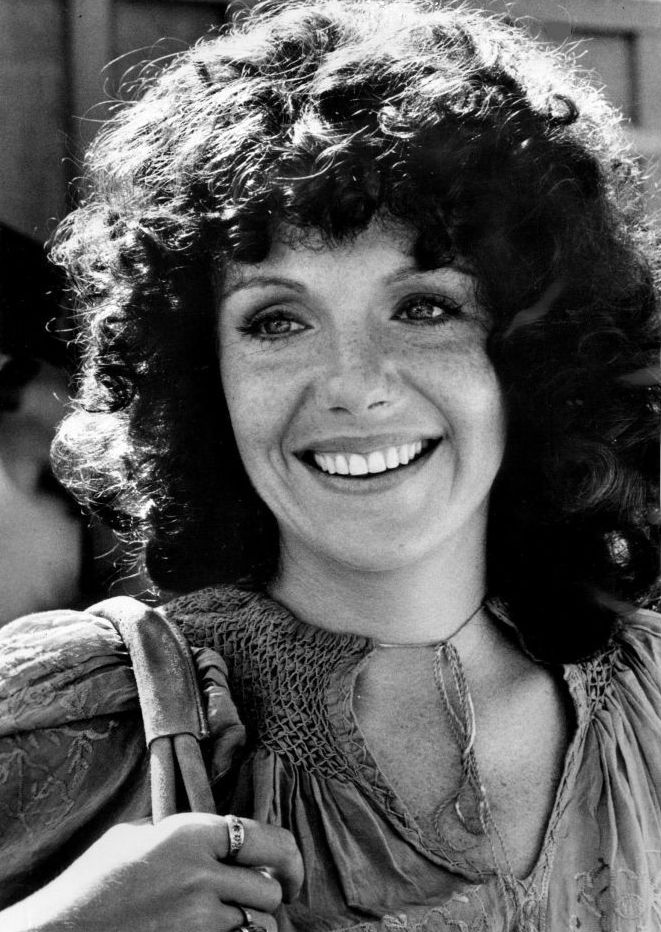
- Clayburgh in Griffin and Phoenix (1976)
- Born: April 30, 1944; New York City, U.S.
- Died: November 5, 2010 (aged 66); Lakeville, Connecticut, U.S.
- Occupation: Actress
- Years active: 1968–2010
- Spouse: David Rabe (m. 1979)
- Children: 2, including Lily Rabe
- Relatives: Jim Clayburgh (brother)

Jill Clayburgh (April 30, 1944 – November 5, 2010) was an American actress known for her work in theater, television, and cinema. She received the Cannes Film Festival Award for Best Actress and was nominated for the Academy Award for Best Actress for her breakthrough role in Paul Mazursky's comedy drama An Unmarried Woman (1978). She received a second consecutive Academy Award nomination for Starting Over (1979) as well as four Golden Globe nominations for her film performances, and two Primetime Emmy Award nominations for her television work.

== Early life ==
Clayburgh was born in New York City, the daughter of a Protestant mother and a Jewish father. Her mother, Julia Louise (née Dorr), was an actress and theatrical production secretary for producer David Merrick. Her father was Albert Henry "Bill" Clayburgh, a manufacturing executive. Her paternal grandmother was concert and opera singer Alma Lachenbruch Clayburgh (1881–1958). Her brother, Jim Clayburgh, is a scenic designer.

Clayburgh reportedly never talked about her religious background and was not raised in the faith of either of her parents. Clayburgh never got along with her parents and began therapy at an early age: "I was very rebellious as a teenager, aside from having an unhappy, neurotic childhood. But I just can't go into it. I think I had a lot of energy and undirected need so I just kind of rebelled in a general fashion. I got myself in terrible, very personal trouble. Therapy has helped me a lot in my life."

As a child, Clayburgh was inspired to become an actress when she saw Jean Arthur as Peter Pan on Broadway in 1950. She was raised on Manhattan's Upper East Side, where she attended the all-girls Brearley School. She then attended Sarah Lawrence College, where she studied religion, philosophy and literature, but ultimately decided to be an actress. She received her acting training at HB Studio.

== Career ==
=== Early career ===
Clayburgh began acting as a student in summer stock and, after graduating, joined the Charles Street Repertory Theater in Boston, where she met another up-and-coming actor and future Academy Award-winning star, Al Pacino, in 1967. They met after starring in Jean-Claude Van Itallie's play America, Hurrah. They had a five-year romance and moved back together to New York City.

In 1968, Clayburgh debuted off-Broadway in the double bill of Israel Horovitz's The Indian Wants the Bronx and It's Called the Sugar Plum, also starring Pacino. Clayburgh and Pacino were cast in "Deadly Circle of Violence", an episode of the ABC television series NYPD, premiering November 12, 1968. Clayburgh at the time was also appearing on the soap opera Search for Tomorrow, playing the role of Grace Bolton. Her father would send the couple money each month to help with finances.

She eventually made her Broadway debut in 1968 in The Sudden and Accidental Re-Education of Horse Johnson, co-starring Jack Klugman, which ran for five performances. In 1969, she starred in an off-Broadway production of the Henry Bloomstein play Calling in Crazy, at the Andy Warhol-owned Fortune theatre. She was in a TV pilot that did not sell, The Choice (1969) and appeared off Broadway in The Nest (1970).

In 1969, Clayburgh made her screen debut in The Wedding Party, written and directed by Brian De Palma. The Wedding Party was filmed in 1963 (during which Clayburgh was at Sarah Lawrence) but not released until six years later. The film focuses on a soon-to-be groom and his interactions with various relatives of his fiancée and members of the wedding party; Clayburgh played the bride-to-be. Her co-stars included Robert De Niro, in one of his early film roles, and Jennifer Salt. In his review from The New York Times, Howard Thompson wrote, "As the harassed engaged couple, two newcomers, Charles Pfluger and Jill Clayburgh, are as appealing as they can be."

=== Broadway success ===
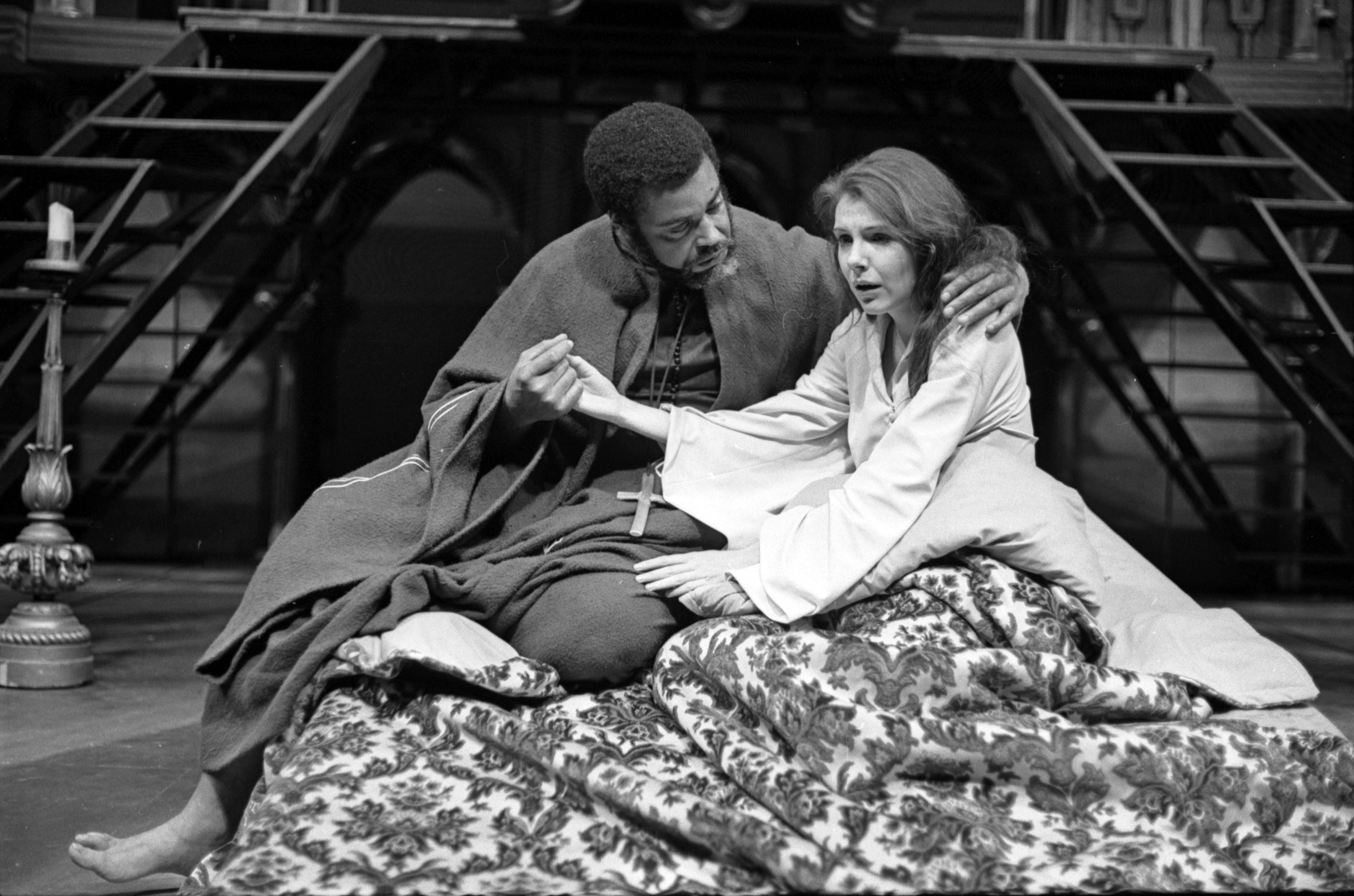
Clayburgh and James Earl Jones in Othello (1971)

Clayburgh attracted attention when she appeared in the Broadway musical The Rothschilds (1970–72) which ran for 502 performances. She then went on to play Desdemona opposite James Earl Jones in the 1971 production of Othello in Los Angeles, and had another Broadway success with Pippin (1972–75), which ran for 1,944 performances. Clive Barnes of The New York Times found Clayburgh to be "all sweet connivance as the widow out to get her man".

During this time, Clayburgh had a string of brief character parts in film and television. Some of these include The Telephone Book (1971), Portnoy's Complaint (1972), The Thief Who Came to Dinner (1973) and The Terminal Man (1974), opposite George Segal.

After guest-starring on an episode of The Snoop Sisters, Clayburgh played Ryan O'Neal's ex-wife in The Thief Who Came to Dinner (1973) and starred in a TV pilot that was not picked up, Going Places (1973). She also guest starred on Medical Center, Maude, and The Rockford Files. She hosted Saturday Night Live on February 28, 1976 (Season 1, Episode 15) with musical guest, Leon Redbone. She later returned to Broadway for Tom Stoppard's Jumpers, which ran for 48 performances. Despite her success on Broadway, it was film acting that really excited Clayburgh: "One of the things I like about the movies is the adventure of it," she said. "I like going to different places and I like doing a different scene every day."

Clayburgh was praised for her performances in the TV movies Hustling (1975), in which she played a prostitute, and The Art of Crime (1975). Hustling was a departure for her: "Before I did Hustling I was always cast as a nice wife. I wasn't very good at it. Then with Hustling, it was a nice role and it was a departure. People saw a different dimension." Her performance in the TV film eventually earned her an Emmy nomination; she later said it revitalised her career. "It changed my career," Clayburgh said. "It was a part that I did well, and suddenly people wanted me. Sidney Furie saw me, and wanted me for Gable and Lombard."

=== An Unmarried Woman and film stardom ===
Clayburgh was cast as Carole Lombard in the 1976 biopic Gable and Lombard with James Brolin as Clark Gable. Variety called it "a film with many major assets, not the least of which is the stunning and smashing performance of Clayburgh as Carole Lombard" and Time Out London felt she "produced a very modern version of the Lombard larkishness." Vincent Canby of The New York Times suggested that her performance "comes off better" than Brolin's Gable, as "she appears to be creating a character whenever the fearfully bad screenplay allows it." Despite this, he felt both actors were miscast as the famous couple, writing further, "Miss Clayburgh could be an interesting actress, but there are always problems when small performers try to portray the kind of giant legends that Gable and Lombard were. Because both Gable and Lombard are still very much alive in their films on television and in repertory theaters, there is difficulty in responding to Mr. Brolin and Miss Clayburgh in any serious way."

She starred in the acclaimed TV movie Griffin and Phoenix (1976) co-starring with Peter Falk. It tells the story of two ill-fated middle-aged characters who both face a terminal cancer diagnosis and have months left to live. Notably, Clayburgh developed the same type of cancer her character had in this film, succumbing to it in 2010. Also in 1976, she had her first big box office success playing the love interest of Gene Wilder's character in the comedy-mystery Silver Streak, also starring Richard Pryor. Critics felt Clayburgh had little to do in Silver Streak, and The New York Times called her "an actress of too much intelligence to be able to fake identification with a role that is essentially that of a liberated ingenue".

In 1977, she had another hit with Semi-Tough, a comedy set in the world of American professional football, which also starred Burt Reynolds and Kris Kristofferson. Clayburgh played Barbara Jane Bookman, who has a subtle love triangle relationship with both Reynolds and Kristofferson's characters. Vincent Canby liked her performance, writing, "Miss Clayburgh, who's been asked to play zany heroines in Gable and Lombard and Silver Streak by people who failed to provide her with material, has much better luck this time. She's charming," and The Washington Post enjoyed her chemistry with Reynolds: "Reynolds and Clayburgh look wonderful together. They seem to harmonize in a way that would only be more apparent - and make their eventual recognition of being in love seem more appropriate." Both Semi-Tough and Silver Streak earned her a reputation "as a popular modern stylist of screwball comedy" and The Guardian noted how Clayburgh "had the kind of warmth and witty sophistication barely seen in Hollywood since Carole Lombard and Jean Arthur".

Clayburgh's breakthrough came in 1978 when she received the first of her two Academy Award for Best Actress nominations for Paul Mazursky's An Unmarried Woman. In what would be her career-defining role, Clayburgh was cast as Erica, the courageous abandoned wife who struggles with her new 'single' identity after her stockbroker husband leaves her for a younger woman. Upon release, An Unmarried Woman drew praise and was popular at the box office, briefly making Clayburgh, at 34, a star. Clayburgh's performance garnered some of the best reviews of her career: Roger Ebert called the film "a journey that Mazursky makes into one of the funniest, truest, sometimes most heartbreaking movies I've ever seen. And so much of what's best is because of Jill Clayburgh, whose performance is, quite simply, luminous. Clayburgh takes chances in this movie. She's out on an emotional limb. She's letting us see and experience things that many actresses simply couldn't reveal" while The New York Times wrote, "Miss Clayburgh is nothing less than extraordinary in what is the performance of the year to date. In her we see intelligence battling feeling – reason backed against the wall by pushy needs."

Writing for The New Yorker, veteran critic Pauline Kael noted:

Jill Clayburgh has a cracked, warbly voice -- a modern polluted-city huskiness. And her trembling, near-beautiful prettiness suggests a lot of pressure. On the stage, she can be dazzling, but the camera isn't in love with her -- she doesn't seem lighted from within. When Erica's life falls apart and her reactions go out of control, Clayburgh's floating, not-quite-sure, not-quite-here quality is just right. And she knows how to use it: she isn't afraid to get puffy-eyed from crying, or to let her face go slack. Her appeal to the audience is in her addled radiance; she seems so punchy that we're a little worried for her. No other film has made such a sensitive, empathic case for a modern woman's need to call her soul her own.

In addition to her Oscar nomination, Clayburgh also earned her first Golden Globe nomination for Best Actress in a Motion Picture – Drama (both of which she lost to Jane Fonda for Coming Home) and won the Best Actress Award at the Cannes Film Festival, which she and Isabelle Huppert shared.

During this time, she turned down the lead in Norma Rae, a film that earned Sally Field her first Oscar. Still, in 1979, Clayburgh had a career peak after starring in two movies that garnered her widespread acclaim. The first was Bernardo Bertolucci's La Luna (1979), which she made in Italy. The film presents an incestuous relationship between a mother and her drug-addicted son, and was poorly received at the time. Clayburgh agreed to star in this film because she felt that "most great roles explore something that is socially taboo". Bertolucci was especially impressed with her work, having complimented her ability "to move from one extreme to the other in the same shot, be funny and dramatic within the same scene". Despite the film's controversy, Clayburgh's performance as a manipulative opera singer was generally praised: Critic Richard Brody called it "her most extravagant role" and a review in The New York Times felt she was "extraordinary under impossible circumstances". Also, in the London Review of Books, Angela Carter wrote, "Jill Clayburgh, seizing by the throat the opportunity of working with a great European director, gives a bravura performance: she is like the life force in person".

Her second and last film of 1979 was Alan J. Pakula's Starting Over, a romantic comedy with Burt Reynolds and Candice Bergen. Pakula hired her because, "the extraordinary thing is that she's so many people. In a Jill Clayburgh movie you don't know what you're going to get." As a nursery-school teacher who falls reluctantly in love with Reynolds's divorced character, her performance was lauded by The New York Times: "Miss Clayburgh delivers a particularly sharp characterization that's letter-perfect during the first part of the story and unconvincing in the second, through no fault of her own." Starting Over earned her a second Oscar and Golden Globe nomination for Best Actress. Also that year, she later returned to the stage with In the Boom Boom Room as a go-go dancer. She had wanted to play this role since 1972 when the play originally premiered on Broadway, but she lost the role to Madeline Kahn. Although she wasn't cast in David Rabe's play, she later married him in 1979.

Her back-to-back success with An Unmarried Woman and Starting Over led writer Mel Gussow to suggest that Clayburgh was one of the few "stars for the 80's, fresh, natural anti‐ingenues" alongside Meryl Streep and Diane Keaton, adding, "These are stage actresses who have become movie stars on their own terms, free of "glamour," ready to clown as well as to play heroines." In 1980, she was cast opposite Michael Douglas in a romantic comedy, It's My Turn, in which she teaches the proof of the snake lemma. Novelist Eleanor Bergstein, who had written the screenplay, was delighted with Clayburgh's casting. "To me," says Bergstein, "Jill is one of the few actresses who looks like she has imagined her life, made her life happen. I think that divides women in a way, women whose intelligence animates their faces. They have willed themselves to be beautiful, to be exactly who they are. Their minds inform their faces. I think Jill is like that. Lots of actresses are just the opposite." Clayburgh herself was attracted to the part because "Kate is the closest person to myself that I have ever played. People always say, 'Oh, An Unmarried Woman, that's you.' But really, of course, it's not." The following year, she was a conservative Supreme Court justice in First Monday in October, a comedy with Walter Matthau. Her performance was praised and earned her a Golden Globe nomination for Best Actress in a Motion Picture – Comedy or Musical.

=== Career setbacks and TV films ===
By the mid-1980s, Clayburgh appeared in fewer and less successful films, despite turning to more dramatic material. She played a valium addict and documentarist in I'm Dancing as Fast as I Can (1981), written by David Rabe, her husband. "I guess people look at me and they think I'm a ladylike character," said Clayburgh, "but it's not what I do best. I do best with characters who are coming apart at the seams." The film received negative reviews, but Janet Maslin of The New York Times liked Clayburgh's performance and wrote that she played her high-powered career woman "earnestly and vigorously". In the controversial Hanna K. (1983), she was a court-appointed Israeli-American lawyer assigned to defend a Palestinian man for director Costa-Gavras. The film was a box office failure and hurt her career. Upset by the film's reception, Clayburgh gave up cinema for three years, during which time she was busy bringing up her children.

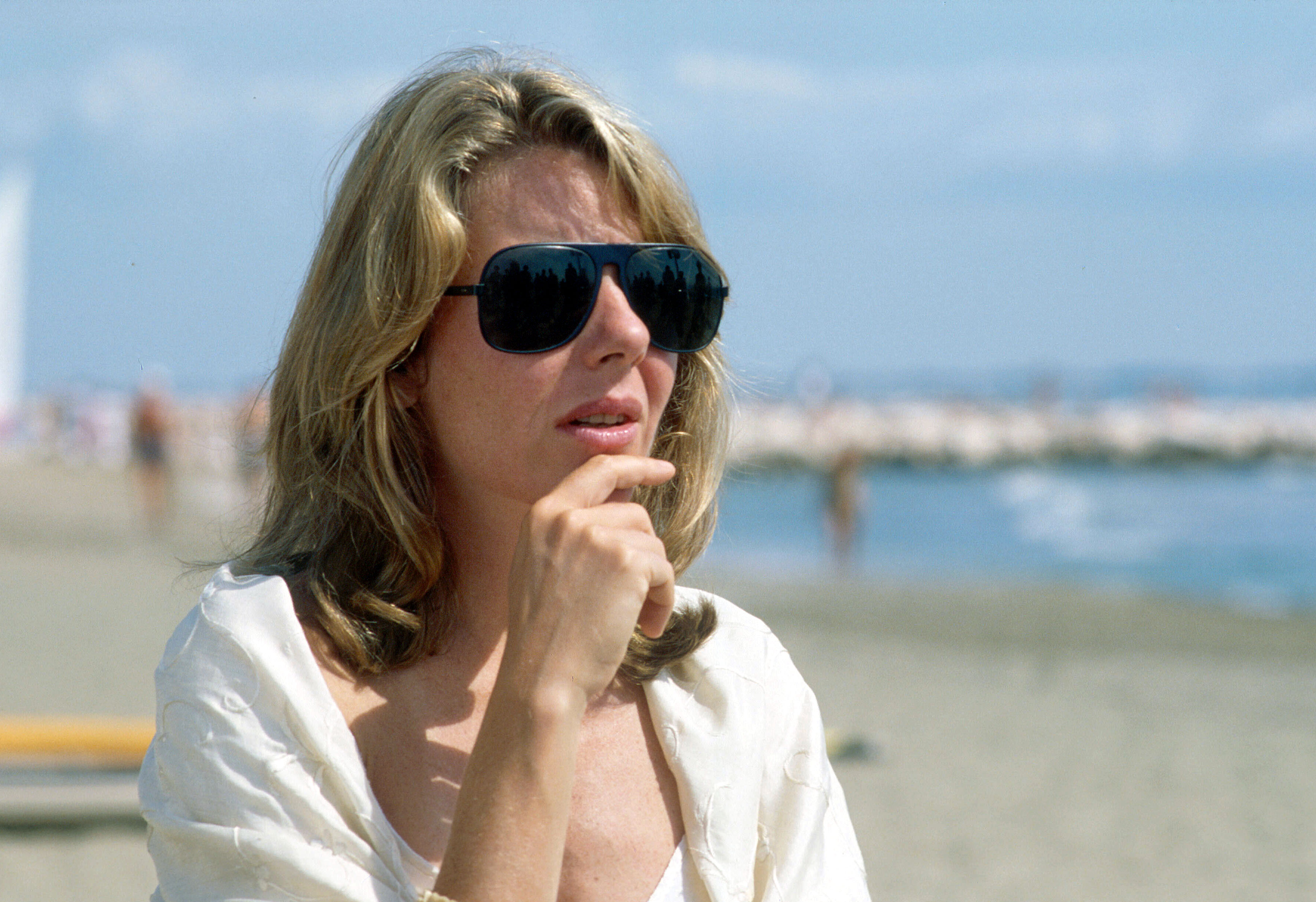
Clayburgh in 1983

Alongside then-rising stars Raúl Julia and Frank Langella, Clayburgh returned to Broadway for a revival of Noël Coward's Design for Living (1984–85), directed by George C. Scott, which ran for 245 performances. Writing for the Christian Science Monitor, John Beaufort wrote, "Jill Clayburgh's Gilda is not merely sexy and volatile. She can be sweetly feminine. She is a woman struggling both to find herself and to discover where she belongs in this triangle. In more than one respect, Miss Clayburgh grasps the deeper as well as the more superficially amusing aspects of her dilemma."

As her feature film career waned, Clayburgh began accepting roles in television films, including Where Are the Children? (1986) as a divorcée who gets revenge on her ex-spouse, and Miles to Go... (1986). She returned to film in 1987 when she drew praise for portraying a shallow, sophisticated Manhattan magazine writer in Andrei Konchalovsky's little-seen independent film Shy People; although the film flopped, this was her most substantial film role after Hanna K. The Guardian found her "amusing" while Ebert called Clayburgh's work "sadly overlooked" and her "other best role" after An Unmarried Woman.

After Shy People, Clayburgh took on a series of roles in the television films Who Gets the Friends? (1988) and Fear Stalk (1989), in which she portrayed a budding cartoonist and a strong-willed soap opera producer, respectively. She then played an investigator studying a child-abuse case in Unspeakable Acts (1990). In 1991, Clayburgh earned decent reviews for her role as English actress and singer Jill Ireland in the television biopic Reason for Living: The Jill Ireland Story (1991), which detailed Ireland's struggle to beat cancer and to help her adopted son get past his heroin addiction. Although Clayburgh never met Ireland, she read her book and listened to taped interviews with her in preparation. Ken Tucker of Entertainment Weekly praised Clayburgh's accent in Reason for Living, writing, "Quite aside from her smooth assurance, Clayburgh pulls off Ireland's English accent without calling attention to herself." This performance led The New York Times to write that her small-screen work was "a sign of the times: older actresses accustomed to playing strong roles are finding their best work [in film] on television".

Gradually, Clayburgh shifted into being more of a supporting character actress in the 1990s, taking on roles as diverse as an antagonistic judge in Trial: The Price of Passion (1992) and the interfering wife of Alan Alda's character in Whispers in the Dark (1992). After appearing in Ben Gazzara's Beyond the Ocean (1990), which was shot in Bali, and the unreleased Pretty Hattie's Baby (1991), she became typecast as an attractive maternal figure: she was the long-missing matriarch in Rich in Love (1992), a wheelchair-user mother in Firestorm: 72 Hours in Oakland (1993), and Eric Stoltz's single mother in Naked in New York (1993). A review in People magazine felt Clayburgh "[did] her best as the footloose mother" in Rich in Love, while Roger Ebert praised her casting in Naked in New York as "exactly on target". She also played Kitty Menendez, who was murdered by her sons, in Honor Thy Father and Mother: The True Story of the Menendez Murders (1993), a role which Variety perceived to be "incomplete, but that has more to do with the script than Clayburgh's performance". She continued to play concerned, protective mothers in For the Love of Nancy (1994), The Face on the Milk Carton (1995), Going All the Way (1997), Fools Rush In (1997), When Innocence Is Lost (1997) and Sins of the Mind (1997), and was in "good form" as the forceful, pushy stage mother in Crowned and Dangerous (1997).

In the late 1990s, Clayburgh guest-starred on episodes of Law & Order and Frasier, and starred in another short-lived sitcom, Everything's Relative (1999), and a short-lived series, Trinity (1999).

=== Later career and final roles ===
After appearing in My Little Assassin (1999) and The Only Living Boy in New York (2000), she had her first prominent lead role since Hanna K. and Shy People in Eric Schaeffer's comedy Never Again (2001). Roger Ebert praised Clayburgh "for do[ing] everything humanly possible to create a character who is sweet and believable" and called it "a reminder of Clayburgh's gifts as an actress", while Stephen Holden of the New York Times credited her for lending "emotional weight" to the part of "a desperately lonely 54-year-old single mother". Also in 2001, she appeared in Falling and had a semi-recurring role on Ally McBeal as Ally's mother and on The Practice, before becoming a regular in another short-lived show, Leap of Faith (2002).

She returned to off-Broadway as a falsely convicted mother-of-two in Bob Balaban's production of The Exonerated (2002–04) with Richard Dreyfuss. Writing for Variety magazine, Charles Isherwood commended Clayburgh for playing her part "with clear-eyed dignity". She then appeared in Phenomenon II (2003) and received an Emmy nomination for guest appearances in the series Nip/Tuck in 2005. That year she continued her resurgent stage career in A Naked Girl on the Appian Way, which ran for 69 performances. More successful was The Busy World is Hushed (2005–06) on off-Broadway, where she replaced Christine Lahti and played a widowed Episcopal minister and scholar. Variety critic David Rooney praised Clayburgh's "wisdom and quiet humor while refusing to define Hannah's questionable behavior and convictions as right or wrong, sound or unsound" and her "embrace of the woman's uncertainties, mak[ing] her all the more human".

In 2006, she appeared on Broadway in Neil Simon's Barefoot in the Park with Patrick Wilson and Amanda Peet; she played Peet's mother, a role originated by Mildred Natwick. It ran for 109 performances and was met with mixed reviews. Still, Clayburgh's performance drew praise and the New York Times critic Ben Brantley lauded her "winning way with dialogue that can make synthetic one-liners sound like filigree epigrams. Trim and dazzlingly blond, she is a glamorous eyeful in Isaac Mizrahi's rich dowager costumes." She returned to the screen that same year as a therapist's eccentric wife in Ryan Murphy's all-star ensemble dramedy Running with Scissors, an autobiographical tale of teenage angst and dysfunction based on the book by Augusten Burroughs; also starring Annette Bening, Gwyneth Paltrow and Evan Rachel Wood, Clayburgh's supporting performance earned her a Best Supporting Actress nomination by the St. Louis Gateway Film Critics Association. By the end of 2006, Clayburgh played a wistful eccentric in what was her last stage appearance, The Clean House (2006–07) on off-Broadway, and was praised for her "goofy lightness" by The Post Gazette.

During 2007–2009, Clayburgh appeared in the ABC television series Dirty Sexy Money, playing the wealthy socialite Letitia Darling. She then played Jake Gyllenhaal's mother in Edward Zwick's Love & Other Drugs (2010) and Kristen Wiig's mother in Paul Feig's acclaimed blockbuster comedy Bridesmaids (2011), which was the last film that Clayburgh completed.

== Personal life ==
As a teenager, Clayburgh had two abortions outside the formal healthcare system, which she chronicled in the 1991 book The Choices We Made: Twenty-Five Women and Men Speak Out About Abortion. Clayburgh dated actor Al Pacino from 1967 to 1972.

She married screenwriter and playwright David Rabe in 1979. They had two children: actor Michael Rabe, and a daughter, the actress Lily Rabe.

Clayburgh was a member of the Writers and Artists for Peace in the Middle East, a pro-Israel group. In 1984, she signed a letter protesting West German arms sales to Saudi Arabia.

== Death ==
Clayburgh died at her home in Lakeville, Connecticut, on November 5, 2010, after privately battling chronic lymphocytic leukemia for more than 20 years.

== Filmography ==
=== Film ===
Year	Title	Role	Notes
1969	The Wedding Party	Josephine	
1971	The Telephone Book	Eyemask	
1972	Portnoy's Complaint	Naomi	
1973	The Thief Who Came to Dinner	Jackie	
1974	The Terminal Man	Angela Black	
1976	Gable and Lombard	Carole Lombard	
1976	Silver Streak	Hilly Burns	
1977	Semi-Tough	Barbara Jane Bookman	
1978	An Unmarried Woman	Erica Benton	Cannes Film Festival Best Actress Award; Nominated – Academy Award for Best Actress; Nominated – BAFTA Award for Best Actress in a Leading Role; Nominated – Golden Globe Award for Best Actress – Motion Picture Drama
1979	La Luna	Caterina Silveri	Nominated – Golden Globe Award for Best Actress – Motion Picture Drama
1979	Starting Over	Marilyn Holmberg	Nominated – Academy Award for Best Actress; Nominated – American Movie Award for Best Actress; Nominated – Golden Globe Award for Best Actress – Motion Picture Musical or Comedy
1980	It's My Turn	Kate Gunzinger	
1981	First Monday in October	Ruth Loomis	Nominated – Golden Globe Award for Best Actress – Motion Picture Musical or Comedy
1982	I'm Dancing as Fast as I Can	Barbara Gordon	
1983	Hanna K.	Hanna Kaufman	
1986	Where Are the Children?	Nancy Holder Eldridge	
1987	Shy People	Diana Sullivan	
1990	Oltre l'oceano	Ellen	a.k.a. Beyond the Ocean (USA)
1991	Pretty Hattie's Baby	Unknown	
1992	Whispers in the Dark	Sarah Green	
1992	Rich in Love	Helen Odom	
1992	Le grand pardon II	Sally White	a.k.a. Day of Atonement
1993	Naked in New York	Shirley, Jake's mother	
1994	Honor Thy Father and Mother: The True Story of the Menendez Murders	Kitty Menendez	
1997	Going All the Way	Alma Burns	
1997	When Innocence Is Lost	Susan French	
1997	Fools Rush In	Nan Whitman	
2001	Never Again	Grace	
2001	Vallen	Ruth	a.k.a. Falling
2006	Running with Scissors	Agnes Finch	
2010	Love & Other Drugs	Mrs. Randall	Posthumous release
2011	Bridesmaids	Judy Walker	Posthumous release (final film role); Washington DC Area Film Critics Association Award for Best Acting Ensemble; Nominated – Screen Actors Guild Award for Outstanding Performance by a Cast in a Motion Picture; Nominated – Broadcast Film Critics Association Award for Best Cast; Nominated – Phoenix Film Critics Society Award for Best Cast; Nominated – Central Ohio Film Critics Association for Best Ensemble

=== Television films ===
Year	Title	Role	Notes
1975	Hustling	Wanda	TV movie Nominated – Primetime Emmy Award for Outstanding Lead Actress in a Miniseries or a Movie
1976	Griffin and Phoenix	Sarah Phoenix	
1986	Miles To Go	Moira Browning	
1989	Fear Stalk	Alexandra Maynard	
1991	Reason For Living: The Jill Ireland Story	Jill Ireland	
1994	For the Love of Nancy	Sally Walsh	
1995	The Face on the Milk Carton	Miranda Jessmon	

=== Television ===
Year	Title	Role	Notes
1968	N.Y.P.D.	Woman in park	Episode: "Deadly Circle of Violence"
1969	Search for Tomorrow	Grace Bolton	
1972	The Snoop Sisters	Mary Nero	Episode: "The Female Instinct"
1974	Medical Center	Beverly	Episode: "Choice of Evils"
1974	The Rockford Files	Marilyn Polonski	Episode: "The Big Ripoff"
1974	Maude	Adele	Episode: "Walter's Heart Attack"
1998	Law & Order	Sheila Atkins	Episode: "Divorce"
1998	Frasier	Marie (voice)	Episode: "The Perfect Guy"
1998	Trinity	Eileen McCallister	3 episodes
1999	Everything's Relative	Mickey Gorelick	4 episodes
1999–2001	Ally McBeal	Jeannie McBeal	4 episodes
2002	Leap of Faith	Cricket Wardwell	6 episodes
2004	Nip/Tuck	Bobbi Broderick	2 episodes Nominated – Primetime Emmy Award for Outstanding Guest Actress in a Drama Series
2004	The Practice	Victoria Stewart	3 episodes
2007–2009	Dirty Sexy Money	Letitia Darling	23 episodes

=== Stage ===
Year	Title	Role	Notes
1968	The Sudden and Accidental Re-Education of Horse Johnson	Dolly (original)	3 previews only
1970	The Rothschilds	Hannah Cohen (original)	Nominated – Tony Award for Best Featured Actress in a Musical
1972	Pippin	Catherine (original)	Record-breaking 1,944 performances
1974	Jumpers	Dotty (original)	
1984	Design for Living	Gilda (original)	17 previews only
2005	A Naked Girl on the Appian Way	Bess Lapin (original)	
2006	Barefoot in the Park	Mrs. Banks (original)	
2008	Ages of the Moon	Unknown	
