= Code Orange (novel) =

Book by Caroline B. Cooney

- First edition
- Author: Caroline B. Cooney
- Language: English
- Publisher: Delacorte Press
- Publication date: 2005
- Publication place: United States
- Media type: Print (hardback & paperback)
- ISBN: 0385732597

Code Orange is a 2005 young adult novel by Caroline B. Cooney. The novel won a National Science Teachers Association recommendation and has been frequently used in classrooms. The Journal of Adolescent & Adult Literacy also marked the book as one of their Young Adults' Choices for 2007.

== Plot ==
Mitchell "Mitty" Blake is a teenage boy who lives in New York City with his parents. He is carefree and does not worry much about his grades or school. When his biology teacher Mr. Lynch assigns him to write a report about an infectious disease, Mitty has no idea what virus to research. His friend Derek has chosen the topic of anthrax while his crush Olivia has chosen typhoid. Derek talks about anthrax constantly and egotistically, while the studious Olivia tries to help Mitty with his research. During a trip to his family's home in the Connecticut countryside that the Blakes visit nearly every weekend, Mitty finds some old medical books from Boston in 1902. What he discovers in the book changes his life forever.

Inside the book, Mitty finds an old envelope containing 100-year-old scabs from Variola major (a severe form of smallpox) from an epidemic in 1902. One of the scabs crumbles as he handles them, causing Mitty to accidentally inhale some of the dust; Mitty's initial reaction is concern that he has lost something that he could use to improve his grade as part of his project. After reading an article from the Centers for Disease Control, Mitty begins to think that he has acquired smallpox from that exposure and is developing symptoms. He posts questions online and emails several people about smallpox and the scabs, unwittingly attracting the attention of people who want to take advantage of the disease.

Before he could attempt suicide to make sure he does not start the smallpox epidemic all over again, Mitty is kidnapped by bio-terrorists who want to use Mitty to infect the United States. Mitty manages to keep his captors and himself from escaping the basement until help arrives; Mitty nearly dies of carbon monoxide poisoning while his captors eventually succumb to the illness. He soon learns that he does not have smallpox, though he is still hospitalized for the carbon monoxide poisoning and the injuries inflicted on him by his kidnappers. At the end of the book, it is implied that Mitty and his longtime crush Olivia will end up a couple.

== Reception ==
Critical reception has been mostly positive, and Code Orange has received praise from the Bulletin of the Center for Children's Books and Horn Book Magazine. Kirkus Reviews and Publishers Weekly both praised Code Orange, and Kirkus Reviews wrote "Punctuating the drama with plenty of humor, Cooney builds the suspense and keeps it going for another teen-pleaser that’s hard to put down."
