= Forbidden (Cooney novel) =

Mystery/romance novel, written 1993

- First edition
- Author: Caroline B. Cooney
- Language: English
- Genre: Mystery/Romance novel
- Publisher: Scholastic
- Publication date: 1993
- Publication place: United States
- Media type: Print (paperback)
- Pages: 320 pp
- ISBN: 0-590-55660-6
- OCLC: 31709615

Forbidden is a 1993 mystery/romantic novel by Caroline B. Cooney, a prolific U.S. author of fiction for teenagers.

== Plot summary ==
18-year-old Annabel Hope Jayquith is both beautiful and famous in her world of wealth and prestige. Daughter to billionaire Hollings Jayquith and the deceased artist Eleanor Hope Jayquith, as well as niece to the famous television news anchor Theodora Jayquith, Annabel is fighting internal demons of loneliness and self-doubt. While at a charity event in Manhattan, she meets and falls in love with 22-year-old Daniel Madison Ransom. Daniel is the son of Senator Madison Ransom who was assassinated for trying to reveal a corrupt industry. Along with his mother, the insane Catherine Ransom, Daniel wants to reveal to the world the real killer, whom they believe is Hollings Jayquith himself.

Meanwhile, Theodora Jayquith’s illegitimate 18-year-old daughter Jade O’Keefe has discovered the identity of her real mother after the death of her foster parents, and is now on her way to Manhattan to confront her mother and gain the fortune she feels she has been denied. In another strand of the plot, a young man who goes by the name Alex arrives in Connecticut seeking to avenge the murder of his brother.

Annabel and Daniel meet again at their mutual friends Venice Pierce and Michael Theil’s wedding in Litchfield, Connecticut. He's a groomsman, she's a bridesmaid, and it seems to be a night of romance. Then Daniel reveals what he and his mother want to do, expose Hollings on his sister’s own show. Annabel, too shocked to speak, flees to her home to comfort herself. However, her solace is invaded by the entrance of Jade, who has used her likeness to Theodora to charm Hollings.

After a kidnapping and rescue, it develops that Annabel's father is innocent of the murder, and the story ends happily.
