= Caroline B. Cooney =

American author (born 1947)

- Born: May 10, 1947 (age 79); Geneva, New York, U.S.
- Education: Indiana University; MGH Institute of Health Professions; University of Connecticut
- Occupation: Author
- Writing career
- Language: English
- Genres: Young adult fiction Fantasy; Historical fiction
- Notable awards: ALA Best Books for Young Adults

Caroline B. Cooney (born May 10, 1947) is an American author of suspense, romance, horror, and mystery books for young adults.

== Biography ==
Cooney was born in 1947 in Geneva, New York. She grew up in Old Greenwich, Connecticut. She attended Indiana University from 1965 to 1966, then went to Massachusetts General Hospital School of Nursing from 1966 to 1967. She went to the University of Connecticut in 1968. She attended several colleges but didn't want to obtain a degree because of certain circumstances. She did not initially know she wanted to be a writer. Cooney took care of three children while writing after her first book got published. That's when the books started getting published one after another.

Cooney's books have received several honors, including an IRA–CBC Children's Choice and being named an ALA Best Book for Young Adults. Most recently Cooney's Diamonds in the Shadow was named a 2008 ALA/YALSA Quick Pick and was a nominee for the Edgar Allan Poe Award.

She currently resides in Rock Hill, South Carolina.

== Selected works ==
=== Stand-alone novels ===
- Safe as the Grave (1979)
- Rear-View Mirror (1980)
- The Paper Caper (1981) (with Gail Owens)
- An April Love Story (1981)
- Nancy and Nick (1982)
- The Personal Touch (1982)
- He Loves Me Not (1982)
- Sand Trap (1983)
- Holly in Love (1983)
- Sun, Sea and Boys (1984)
- Nice Girls Don't (1984)
- I'm Not Your Other Half (1984)
- Don't Blame the Music (1986)
- Saturday Night (1986)
- The Rah Rah Girls (1987)
- Last Dance (1987)
- Among Friends (1987)
- New Year's Eve (1988)
- The Girl Who Invented Romance (1988)
- Camp Girl-Meets-Boy (1988)
- Summer Nights (1988)
- Family Reunion (1989)
- Summer Love (1990)
- Camp Reunion (1991)
- The Party's Over (1991)
- Twenty Pageants Later (1991)
- Freeze Tag (1992)
- Flight #116 Is Down (1992)
- Operation: Homefront (1992)
- Perfume (1993)
- Forbidden (1993)
- The Stranger (1993)
- Emergency Room (1994)
- Driver's Ed (1994)
- Twins (1994)
- Unforgettable (1994)
- Night School (1995)
- Flash Fire (1995)
- Wanted! (1997)
- The Terrorist (1997)
- What Child is This?: A Christmas Story (1997)
- Prisoner of Time (1998)
- Hush Little Baby (1999)
- Burning Up (1999)
- Tune in Anytime (1999)
- Mummy (2000)
- Mercy (2001) aka The Ransom of Mercy Carter
- Fatality (2001)
- Goddess of Yesterday (2002) aka On the Seas to Troy
- Evil Returns (2003)
- Fatal Bargain (2003)
- The Vampire's Promise: Deadly Offer (2003)
- Code Orange (2005)
- Hit the Road (2006)
- A Friend at Midnight (2006)
- Enter Three Witches (2007)
- Diamonds in the Shadow (2007)
- A Night to Remember (2009)
- If the Witness Lied (2009)
- They Never Came Back (2009)
- Three Black Swans (2010)
- The Lost Songs (2011)
- No Such Person (2015)

=== The Vampire's Promise trilogy ===
- Deadly Offer (originally titled The Cheerleader) (1991)
- Evil Returns (originally titled The Return of the Vampire) (1992)
- Fatal Bargain (originally titled The Vampire's Promise) (1993)

=== Janie Johnson series ===
- The Face on the Milk Carton
- Whatever Happened to Janie?
- The Voice on the Radio
- What Janie Found
- What Janie Saw (New Ebook)
- Janie Face to Face

=== Losing Christina series ===
- The Fog (1989)
- The Snow (1990)
- The Fire (1990)

The Losing Christina books have since been retitled Fog, Snow, and Fire.

=== Time Travelers Quartet ===
- Both Sides of Time (1995)
- Out of Time (1996)
- Prisoner of Time (1998)
- For All Time (2001)
