= Madhouse Brigade =

Madhouse Brigade is a half-hour sketch comedy series conceived and written by Alexander "Sandy" Marshall, and produced by Alexander Marshall, Dale Keidel and Jim Larkin. It aired in U.S. syndication in 1978 and 1979, and won Marshall an Emmy Award in 1980 as Best Writer of an Entertainment Series.

This independent production included appearances by future Saturday Night Live cast member, Joe Piscopo, Ty-D-Bowl Man, Dan Resin as well as Frank Nastasi, also known as the man behind "White Fang" on The Soupy Sales Show. Other cast members included Karen Rushmore, Carlos Carrasco, J.J. Lewis, Bob "Rocket" Ryan and Nola Fairbanks.

Sketches included a fashion show featuring clothing made of food; commercial parodies involving a dog food spokesman getting carried away and eating the product; diapers for adult "Campers"; a sleep aid that makes your "Partner" go to sleep; Adolf Hitler as a stand-up comedian; and musical performances that included the original love songs "It's Time to Start Unloading You" and "Love Stinks the Most".

The Madhouse Brigade theme song and musical arrangements were by musical director Tony Monte.
