= Modine =

Modine is a surname. Notable people include:

- Matthew Modine (born 1959), American film actor
- Nola Fairbanks (born 1924 as Nola Jo Modine), American actress
- Ruby Modine, American actress and singer, daughter of Matthew
- Arthur B. Modine, American entrepreneur in thermal management
