= On with the Show! =

1929 pre-Code American musical comedy film

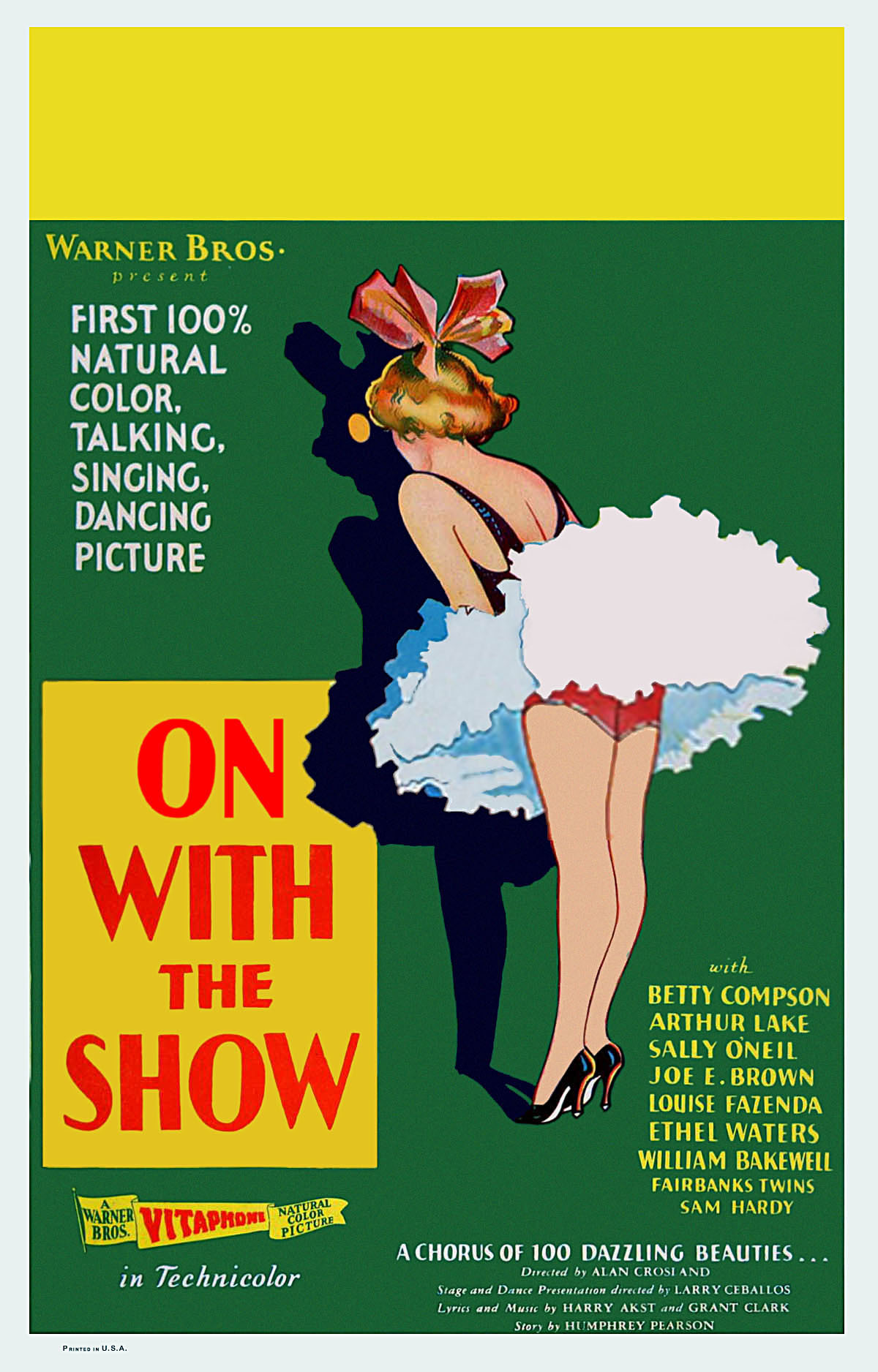
- Theatrical release poster
- Directed by: Alan Crosland
- Written by: Robert Lord (scenario & dialogue)
- Based on: Shoestring by Humphrey Pearson
- Produced by: Warner Bros.
- Starring: Joe E. Brown; Betty Compson; Arthur Lake; Ethel Waters; Louise Fazenda; Sally O'Neil; William Bakewell
- Cinematography: Tony Gaudio (Technicolor)
- Edited by: William Holmes
- Music by: Harry Akst; Grant Clarke
- Color process: Two-strip Technicolor
- Production company: Warner Bros. Pictures
- Distributed by: Warner Bros. Pictures
- Release dates: May 28, 1929 (NYC); July 13, 1929 (US); November 27, 1929 (IRE); January 11, 1930 (AU)
- Running time: 103 minutes
- Country: United States
- Language: English
- Budget: $493,000
- Box office: $2,415,000 (worldwide rentals)

On with the Show! is a 1929 American sound (All-Talking) pre-Code musical film directed by Alan Crosland and released by Warner Bros. Pictures. Filmed in two-color Technicolor, the film became the first all-talking, all-color feature-length film, and the second color feature film released by Warner Bros.; the first was the partly color musical The Desert Song (1929). On January 1, 2025, the film's copyright expired, resulting in the film entering the public domain.

== Plot ==
The full film and overture

At the Wallace Theater in Milbank, New Jersey, head usher Jimmy and hat check girl Kitty are in a romantic relationship. Kitty dreams of becoming a Broadway actress to help her old father, the doorman, but is too poor and cannot get an acting job.

Sarah Fogarty is an actress and girlfriend of Jerry, the director. She is jealous of Nita French getting the lead role. The cast and crew are frustrated for they have not been paid by Jerry. During the show, Sam Bloom, a prop and scenery magnate, came to collect the money or he would take the scenery, but Jerry did not have the money. During the first number, "Welcome Home", Mr. Bloom makes it clear he only wants the money. Nita sings "Let Me Have My Dreams" to Harold Astor, the star of the show.

Backstage, Jerry explains that Bob Wallace, the owner of the theater and long-term boyfriend of Nita, stopped paying the troupe, therefore leaving them with unpaid bills and actors, but this does not change Mr. Bloom’s mind. Just before he is about to leave, Sarah bumps into him and boasts about her requests from various people. She persuades him to stay when Ethel Waters went onstage to sing "Am I Blue?".

In the coat room, Kitty longs for the stage, and Mr. Wallace suggests that she get with him, to which she declines. Jimmy suggests to Jerry that they should hold up the box office to get the money. Mr. Wallace shows up in a drunken state and Jerry accuses Mr. Wallace of not paying because he couldn't get a first date with Kitty. Just before Mr. Wallace hits him, Sarah shows up and breaks the commotion unassumingly.

Another number plays ("Lift the Juleps to Your Two Lips"). Nita as the Phantom Sweetheart gets up on the wall and sings "Let Me Have My Dreams", though nobody else witnesses it. While nobody is looking, a mysterious armed figure robs the box office. The box office clerk yells for help and tells Jerry that they were just robbed. Joe, a theater detective accuses Jimmy and Jerry of robbing the box office. After the interrogation by Joe, Jerry and Jimmy accuse each other of the crime.

Onstage, Joe Beaton and Harold are going fox hunting. Nita runs out, and Harold Falls off his horse and blacks out. The screen blacks out, and fades into a dream palace ("In the Land of Let's Pretend") with Nita dressed as a queen with women in Zeigfeld style costumes. Joe Beaton comes out in a motorcycle and sentences Harold to death. Harold is woken up by Joe Beaton. Harold can only think about the phantom sweetheart. Harold's fiancée sings "Don't it Mean a Thing to You?". Bert, a man playing the butler, has stage fright and faints in the dressing room. Jerry takes his place, although he doesn’t know the line and messes up.

Backstage, Kitty is in the prop room, when Mr. Wallace walks in. He locks the door and starts to make advances and gives her alcohol. She screams for Jimmy who gets there in time to save her. He hits Mr. Wallace in the face and forces him out of the room. Jimmy turns angry with Kitty when he smells alcohol on her breath.

While Harold starts the Second Act, Nita refuses to go on without being paid. Harold tries to stall onstage until Kitty appears in the gazebo dressed as the Phantom Sweetheart in a full body veil singing "Let Me Have My Dreams". Backstage, everyone congratulates Kitty. Sarah is worried that Nita will hurt Kitty. Instead, Nita congratulates Kitty and tells her that her days of show business are over. Ethel Waters sings "Birmingham Bertha".

Kitty's dad confessed to robbing the box office backstage, and everyone agrees to let him go scot-free after returning the money. Bob Wallace is thrown out for harassing Kitty and hitting Jimmy. Nita says that she is going to leave Mr. Wallace and retire from the stage.

The final scene is show, which is Harold's wedding ("Wedding Day"). He reveals the Phantom Sweetheart which he claims as his real bride, and Joe Beaton proposes to Harold's Fiancée. During the bows, Kitty comes out with Jimmy and the show comes to its happy ending.

== Cast ==
- Betty Compson as Nita French
- Louise Fazenda as Sarah Fogarty
- Sally O'Neil as Kitty
- Joe E. Brown as Joe Beaton
- Purnell B. Pratt as Sam Bloom
- William Bakewell as Jimmy
- Madeline and Marion Fairbanks as the Dorsey Twins
- Wheeler Oakman as Bob Wallace (also known as Willie Durant)
- Sam Hardy as Jerry
- Thomas Jefferson as Dad
- Lee Moran as Pete, the Stage Manager
- Harry Gribbon as Joe
- Arthur Lake as Harold Astor
- Josephine Houston as Bert, Harold's fiancée
- Henry Fink as Father
- Otto Hoffman as Bart
- Tom O'Brien as box office operator
- Ethel Waters as herself/Bernice from Birmingham
- Harmony Four Quartette as themselves
- Four Covans as themselves
- Angelus Babe as himself

== Songs ==
- "Welcome Home"- Music by Harry Akst, lyrics by Grant Clarke, performed by Henry Fink and the Four Covans with Warner Bros. Vitaphone Orchestra and Stage Chorus
- "Let Me Have My Dreams"- Music by Akst, lyrics by Clarke, performed by Betty Compson with Warner Bros. Vitaphone Orchestra
- "Am I Blue?"- Music by Akst, lyrics by Clarke, performed by Ethel Waters and the Harmony Four Quartette with Warner Bros. Vitaphone Orchestra

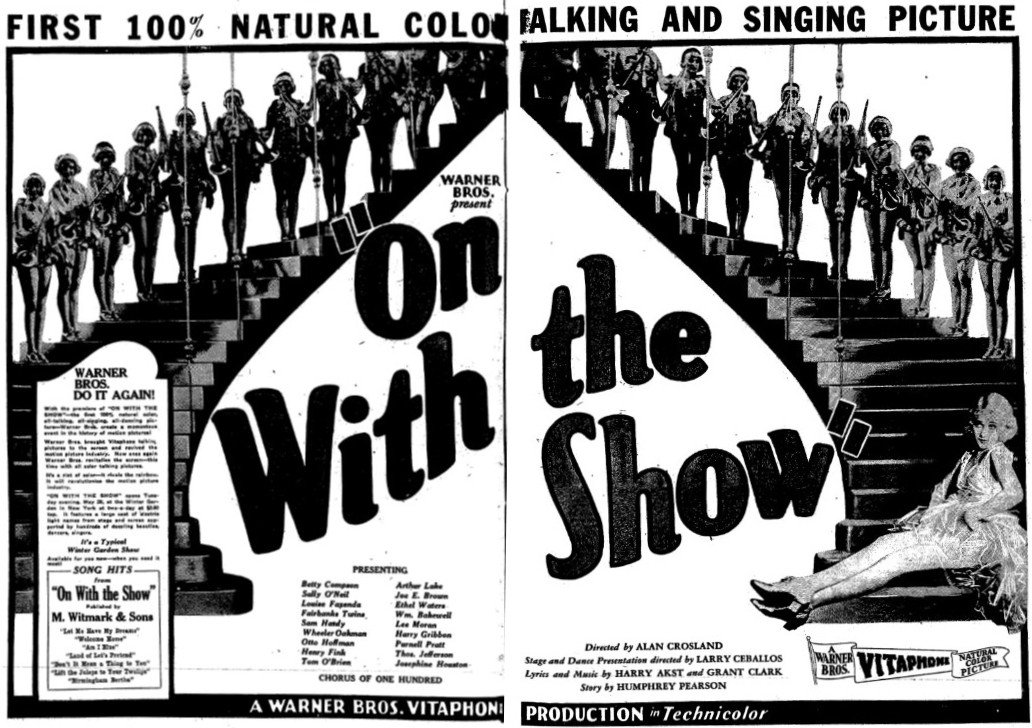
Advertisement from Variety magazine

- "Lift the Juleps to Your Two Lips"- Music by Akst, lyrics by Clarke, performed by Henry Fink, Josephine Huston, the Four Covans and Madeline and Marion Fairbanks with Warner Bros. Vitaphone Orchestra and Stage Chorus
- "Let Me Have My Dreams"- Music by Akst, lyrics by Clarke, performed by Betty Compson with Warner Bros. Vitaphone Orchestra
- "In the Land of Let's Pretend"- Music by Akst, lyrics by Clarke, performed by Mildred Caroll with Warner Bros. Vitaphone Orchestra and Stage Chorus
- "Don't it Mean a Thing to You?"- Music by Akst, lyrics by Clarke, sung by Josephine Houston and Arthur Lake, danced by Marion and Madeline Fairbanks with Warner Bros. Vitaphone Orchestra
- "Let Me Have My Dreams"- Music by Akst, lyrics by Clarke, performed by Sally O'Neil with Warner Bros. Vitaphone Orchestra
- "Birmingham Bertha"- Music by Akst, lyrics by Clarke, sung by Ethel Waters, danced by Angelus Babe with Warner Bros. Vitaphone Orchestra
- "Wedding Day"- Music by Akst, lyrics by Clarke, sung by Henry Fink, Arthur Lake, Sally O'Neil with Warner Bros. Vitaphone Orchestra and Stage Chorus
- "Finale"- On with the Show Medley, "Don't it Mean a Thing to You?" Performed by Josephine Houston/"Let me Have My Dreams" Performed by Sally O'Neil/"Am I Blue?" Performed by Bridal Chorus/"Lift the Juleps to your Two Lips" Performed by Bridal Chorus/ "Welcome Home" Performed by Warner Bros. Vitaphone Orchestra and Stage Chorus

=== Notes ===
The song "In the Land of Let's Pretend" was sung by The Gumm Sisters in the Vitaphone Varieties short film "Bubbles", as well as the Vitaphone Kiddies singing songs from Paris, Little Johnny Jones, and The Show of Shows. "Am I Blue" also gained popularity and was covered and featured in many other films.

== Production and promotion ==
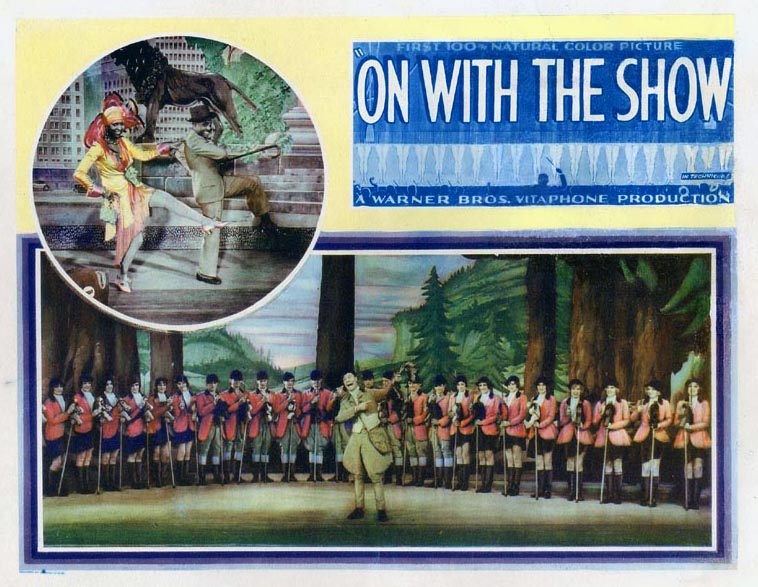
Lobby card

Warner Bros. promoted On with the Show! as filmed in "natural color." This was the first in a series of Warner Bros. contracted color films.

The film generated much interest in Hollywood and virtually overnight, most other major studios began filming in the color process. The film would be eclipsed by the far greater success of the second Technicolor film, Gold Diggers of Broadway. (Song of the West was completed first, but its release was delayed until March 1930).

== Reception ==
=== Box office ===
The film was a box-office hit, with a worldwide gross of more than $2 million.

According to Warner Bros. records, the film earned $1,741,000 domestically and $674,000 internationally.

=== Critical ===
Reviews from critics were mixed. Mordaunt Hall of The New York Times wrote that the film was "to be felicitated on the beauty of its pastel shades, which were obtained by the Technicolor process, but little praise can be accorded its story or to its raucous voices....It would have been better if this film had no story, and no sound, for it is like a clumsy person arrayed in Fifth Avenue finery." Variety reported that the film was "too long in running", but was nevertheless "impressive, both as an entertainment and as a talker." Film Daily called it "fine entertainment and a very adroit mixture of comedy, some rather bad pathos and musical comedy numbers." The New York Herald Tribune declared it "the best thing the films have done in the way of transferring Broadway music shows to the screen and, even if the story is bad and the entire picture considerably in need of cutting it is an admirable and frequently handsome bit of cinema exploring." John Mosher of The New Yorker wrote that the film was "completely undistinguished for wit, charm, or novelty, except that it is done in color. Possibly in the millennium all movies will be colored. In these early days of the art, however, not much can be said for it, except that it is not really distressing."

The film is recognized by American Film Institute in these lists:

- 2004: AFI's 100 Years...100 Songs:
  - "Am I Blue?" – Nominated

== Preservation ==
A surviving 20-second color fragment found in 2005.

One reel of the 35mm color nitrate print of On with the Show! exists at the BFI archive. Only black-and-white prints have survived from the remainder of the film. A fragment of an original color print lasting about 20 seconds surfaced in 2005. Other original color fragments were discovered in 2014. A copy of the black-and-white version has long been held by the Library of Congress. The film's copyright expired on January 1, 2025, resulting in the film entering the public domain.

== Home media ==
In December 2009, On with the Show! (in black and white) was made available on manufactured-on-demand DVD by the Warner Archive Collection.

== See also ==
- List of early color feature films
- List of early sound feature films (1926–1929)
- List of Warner Bros. films (1918–1929)
- List of incomplete or partially lost films
- Mint julep
