= June Preston =

American film actress and operatic soprano (1928–2022)

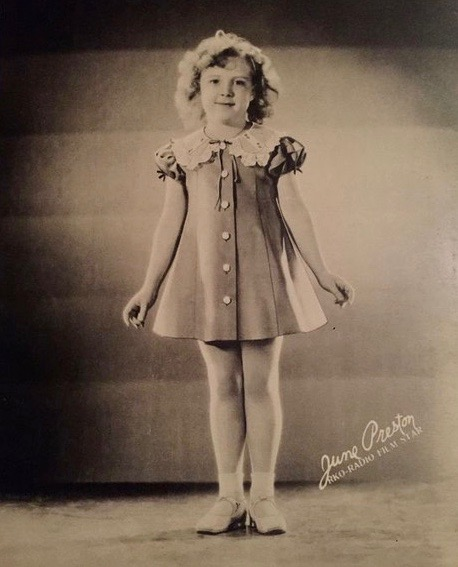
- Preston publicity photo c. 1935
- Born: December 29, 1928; Glendale, California, U.S.
- Died: May 11, 2022 (aged 93); Montclair, New Jersey, U.S.
- Education: Seattle University
- Occupations: Actress, opera singer
- Years active: 1934–1980
- Spouse: Saul Höuben (m. 1963)
- Children: 1

June Preston (December 29, 1928 – May 11, 2022) was an American child actress in the 1930s and early 1940s, who began her film career at RKO Pictures, with a minor role as Mrs. Blewett's daughter in the 1934 film Anne of Green Gables.

As a child star, she was promoted with heavy marketing and merchandising, including a clothing line, to position her as a child star rival to Shirley Temple.

Preston appeared in film shorts of Meglin Kiddies and Our Gang and had small cameos in feature films It Happened One Night, Christmas in July and Strawberry Blonde.

Preston performed as a soprano singer in the United States and in recitals in Latin America and Europe.

== Biography ==
=== Early life and film career ===
Preston was born in Glendale, California and trained at the Meglin Dance Studio in Beverly Hills and Santa Monica. After moving to Temple, Texas, at the age of four, her film career began during a trip to Hollywood, where her photograph was shown to the casting office of RKO in 1934 and she was cast in a small role in Anne of Green Gables. Preston then signed a contract with the studio and appeared in a variety of child star-focused films.

She also appeared in the 1934 MGM film Have a Heart. By 1936, she was promoted as an RKO "featured child player" and clothing model. She also had a small role in the film Our Gang Follies of 1938. For several years, a clothing line was produced under her name, including dresses named June Preston Frocks. After leaving film to study opera, she moved to West Seattle and attended James Madison Junior High and then West Seattle High School, graduating in 1947. Her high school would later, in 1989, induct her into their Hall of Fame.

=== Singing career ===
Preston studied music at Seattle University where she appeared in the university's 1947 production of Gilbert and Sullivan's H.M.S. Pinafore and was the soprano soloist in the university's performance of Giuseppe Verdi's Requiem in 1949. In 1950, she began a singing tour through Mexico, performing in Guadalajara at the Degollado Theater in July.

In the summer of 1952 she toured with a company led by Argentine opera impresario Gregorio Ravic, which included Nicola Moscona, Jean Madeira, and Graciela Rivera, for four weeks of performances in cities in Colombia. (Note: Ravic's company was known as the "Compañía de Ópera Estrellas del Metropolitan" (Stars of the Metropolitan) as several of the ensemble's leads were principal artists of the Metropolitan Opera (the "Met") who performed with this touring group while on summer break from the Met. However, it was not affiliated with the Met and also employed singers from other American opera companies. A 1952 Variety article reported that Preston was married to Ravic at this time.) Preston sang the role of Mimi in La bohème opposite the tenor Walter Fredericks as Rodolfo. She was a member of the chorus of the San Francisco Opera for the 1952–1953 season and 1953–1954 season. Beginning a tour through the Caribbean in early 1954, she conducted a series of performances in February of that year starting in Port-au-Prince, Haiti. Later in the month, she traveled to Roatán, Honduras and performed with pianist Manuel Rueda from the Dominican Republic.

On November 4 and 5, 1961, at the Kiel Opera House in St. Louis, she was a soloist in the final movement of Beethoven's Symphony No. 9 in concert with the St. Louis Symphony Orchestra. She subsequently began a tour of recitals in Europe. In October 1962, she sang at Op Gouden Wieken, a concert hall in The Hague. She gave a recital on November 30, 1962, in Barcelona at the Palau de la Música Catalana and a subsequent performance in Tarragona on December 3, 1962.

=== Personal life and death ===
Preston married Belgian concert violinist Saul Höuben in 1963. She died in Montclair, New Jersey, on May 11, 2022, from complications of dementia, aged 93.
