= Ethel Marion Milne =

American vaudevillian and mother of Judy Garland (1896–1953)

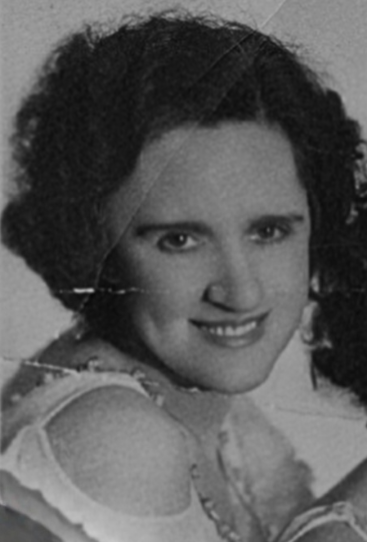
- Milne in 1930
- Born: November 17, 1896; Michigamme, Michigan, U.S.
- Died: January 5, 1953 (aged 56); Santa Monica, California, U.S.
- Occupation: Vaudevillian
- Spouse: Francis Avent Gumm (m. 1914; died 1935)
- Children: 3, including Judy Garland

Ethel Marion Milne (November 17, 1896 – January 5, 1953) was an American vaudevillian. She was the mother of Judy Garland and played a role in managing her three daughters' early careers in entertainment.

== Life and career ==
Milne was born on November 17, 1896, in Michigamme, Michigan, to Eva Marion Fitzpatrick and Robert Emmett Milne, a carpenter. She grew up in Superior, Wisconsin. Ethel’s early exposure to the performing arts was influenced by the popularity of vaudeville, a form of variety entertainment that flourished in the early 20th century, which later developed her interest in performance.

Milne was an actress, singer, and pianist. She married Francis “Frank” Gumm, a theater manager, in 1914. The couple moved to Grand Rapids, Minnesota. There, they managed the New Grand Theatre, which featured silent films and live performances. Together, they had three daughters: Mary Jane “Suzanne” Gumm, Dorothy Virginia “Jimmie” Gumm, and Frances “Baby” Ethel Gumm, who would later change her name to Judy Garland. The theatre showcased a variety of acts, including vaudeville performances, silent films, and live music, helping to foster a local arts scene. It was also the place where Milne's daughters began their performing careers as a vaudeville group The Gumm Sisters. Their early acts often featured a mix of singing, dancing, and harmonizing, with Milne accompanying them on the piano.

Milne served as manager for Garland during the early stages of her career. Milne negotiated Garland's contract with Metro-Goldwyn-Mayer and oversaw her professional development during this period.

As Garland's career progressed, including her breakthrough role, Dorothy Gale, in The Wizard of Oz (1939), professional tensions emerged between mother and daughter. Biographers have opined that Milne's rigorous management style may have influenced Garland's later psychological and substance abuse challenges.

Milne remained involved in her daughters' careers until her death on January 5, 1953, in the parking lot of Douglas Aircraft Company at the 27th Street in Santa Monica, California, at the age of 56.
