= Dan Resin =

American actor

- Born: February 22, 1931; South Bend, Indiana, US
- Died: July 31, 2010 (aged 79); Wayne, New Jersey, US
- Occupation: Actor

Dan Resin (February 22, 1931 – July 31, 2010) was an American actor.

== Early life ==
Resin was born in South Bend, Indiana. He was three years old when his parents divorced. Resin met his future wife in the seventh grade. He graduated from Indiana University Bloomington in 1954. While at Indiana University, Resin became a member of the Alpha Iota Chapter of the Theta Chi fraternity. Shortly after graduation, he was drafted into the United States Army and served in Fort Monmouth, New Jersey. After his discharge, he finished college at Columbia University in New York City.

He worked an assortment of jobs from singer to Master of Ceremonies at the Roxy Theater and later, Radio City Music Hall.

== Career ==
Dan played many roles on Broadway such as Freddie Eynsford-Hill in My Fair Lady (1956). Resin appeared in the original off-Broadway production of Once Upon a Mattress, and continued with the show when it made a successful move to Broadway. His stage productions include Don't Drink the Water, On a Clear Day You Can See Forever, Fade Out - Fade In, and Young Abe Lincoln.

Resin is most famous for his movie role as Dr. Beeper in the comedy film Caddyshack (1980). His other movie roles included Wise Guys, The Sunshine Boys, The Private Files of J. Edgar Hoover, The Happy Hooker (1975) and other films. Resin played the role of a young Richard Nixon in the 1972 parody film, Richard.

His television career included a CBS show, On Our Own; the soap opera Edge of Night; Lovers and Friends; David Frost Review; and an NBC show, Go USA. He made appearances on the kids show Captain Kangaroo, and was featured in the 1978 syndicated comedy Madhouse Brigade.

Resin may be best remembered by the public for his roles in TV commercials, such as the dapper-clad Ty-D-Bol man.

In the 1970s and 1980s, he was doing as many as two and three commercials a week. During one televised Super Bowl, he had two starring commercials air back to back, a feat unequaled by any actor.

Other acting roles include Music Box, The Man With One Red Shoe, Deadhead Miles, If Ever I See You Again, Remember WENN, Judith Krantz's Till We Meet Again, That's Adequate, Soggy Bottom USA, God Told Me To, Crazy Joe, Hail, and New York Undercover.

After semi-retirement from acting, he became an extraordinary minister of Holy Communion.

== Personal life ==
Resin and his wife, Margaret, lived in Union City, New Jersey, before moving to Weehawken and ultimately, Secaucus. He and his wife had three daughters, Elizabeth, Maryanne, and Alexandra.

Resin died from complications of Parkinson's disease on July 31, 2010, aged 79. He was survived by his wife of 55 years, Margaret, and their daughters.

== Filmography ==
Year	Title	Role	Notes
1975	Hail	The President	
1972	Richard	Young Richard	
1973	Deadhead Miles	Brickyard Foreman	
1974	Crazy Joe	FBI Agent	Uncredited
1975	The Happy Hooker	The Senator with Chris	
1975	The Sunshine Boys	Mr. Ferranti, Actor's Fund Home Director	
1976	God Told Me To	Wall Street Executive	
1977	The Private Files of J. Edgar Hoover	President's Advisor	
1977	For Liberty and Union	John Carlile	
1978	If Ever I See You Again	Account Supervisor	
1980	Caddyshack	Dr. Beeper	
1981	Soggy Bottom USA	Rogers	
1985	The Man With One Red Shoe	Man in Car	
1986	Wise Guys	Maitre d'	
1989	That's Adequate	Doctor	
