= Francis Avent Gumm =

American vaudevillian (1886–1935)

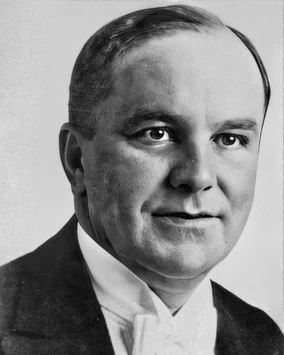
- Gumm circa 1920s
- Born: March 20, 1886; Murfreesboro, Tennessee, US
- Died: November 17, 1935 (aged 49); Los Angeles, California, US
- Burial place: Forest Lawn Memorial Park (Hollywood Hills)
- Other name: Frank Gumm
- Occupations: Vaudevillian; theater manager
- Spouse: Ethel Marion Milne (m. 1914)
- Children: 3, including Judy Garland

Francis "Frank" Avent Gumm (March 20, 1886 – November 17, 1935) was an American vaudevillian and theatre manager. He was the father of the American actress, singer, and vaudevillian Judy Garland.

== Early life ==
Gumm was born on March 20, 1886, in Murfreesboro, Tennessee, United States. He was the son of Clemmie (née Baugh) and William T. Gumm. After Gumm's mother died in 1895, his family faced poverty. His godfather, the millionaire George M. Darrow, discovered that Gumm was an exceptional vocalist and helped the boy earn a choral scholarship for college. Pl Gumm attended Sewanee Military Academy, followed by six years at the University of the South. He left college in 1904 to attend to his brother and sister in Murfreesboro; his father died in 1906. Gumm worked as a court reporter and stenographer by day and at his uncle Walter D. Fox's theater in the evenings. Gumm, his siblings, and his uncle moved to Tullahoma, Tennessee in approximately 1909. There, his uncle ran a Knights of Pythias home for orphans and widows.

== Career ==
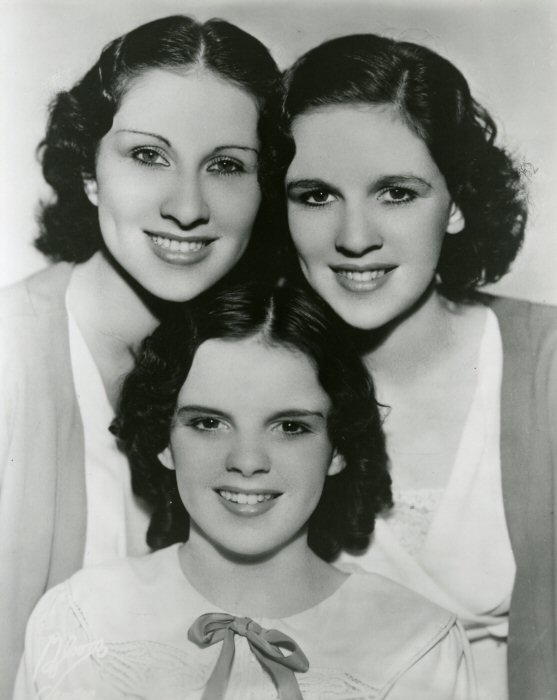
The Gumm Sisters, also known as The Garland Sisters, c. 1935. Top row, left to right: Mary Jane Gumm, Dorothy Virginia Gumm Bottom Row: Frances Ethel Gumm (Judy Garland)

Starting in 1910, Gumm toured in vaudeville as a tenor singer. He met his future wife, Ethel Marion Milne, in Superior, Wisconsin. She shared his passion for the performing arts, often playing the piano during performances while Gumm managed the logistics and bookings. In 1914, they married and moved to Grand Rapids, Minnesota, where Gumm owned and operated the New Grand Theatre. The theatre showcased a variety of acts, including vaudeville performances, silent films, and live music. Gumm's daughters began performing together at the theatre as a vaudeville group known as The Gumm Sisters. Their early acts often featured a mix of singing, dancing, and harmonizing, with Ethel Gumm accompanying them on the piano.

In 1926, seeking better opportunities for the daughters' careers, the Gumms moved to Lancaster, California (which is located near Hollywood). Gumm called his theater in Lomita, California Garland's Lomita Theatre.

== Personal life ==
Gumm married Ethel Marion Milne in 1914. The couple had three daughters: Mary Jane Gumm (born 1915), Dorothy Virginia Gumm (born 1917), and Frances Ethel Gumm (born 1922). The latter is better known as Judy Garland.

Despite a shared commitment to their daughters’ early careers, the Gumms' marriage reportedly faced tension due to financial pressures and personal struggles. Some biographies and historical accounts indicate that Gumm may have had sexual relationships with men that contributed to strain in his marriage and led to difficulties within the family.

Gumm died from spinal meningitis on November 17, 1935, in Cedars of Lebanon Hospital in Los Angeles, California, at the age of 49. He is buried in Forest Lawn Memorial Park.
