= Jones Beach Theater =

Outdoor amphitheatre in Wantagh, New York, US

Northwell at Jones Beach Theater
- The Beach
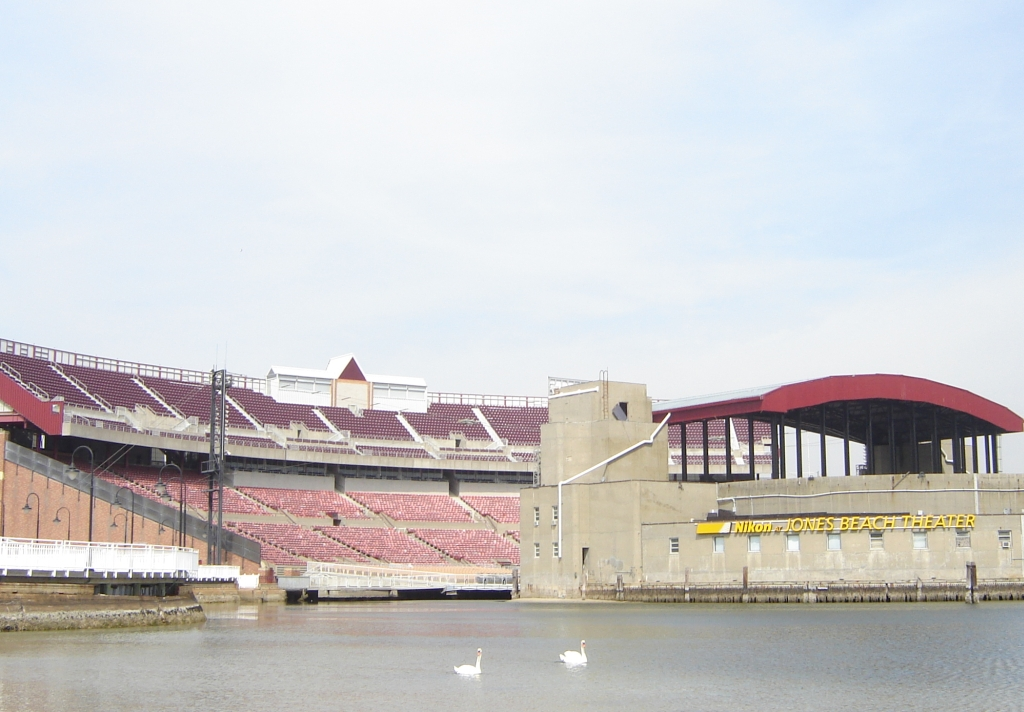
- The exterior of Jones Beach Theater, c. 2007
- Interactive map of Northwell at Jones Beach Theater
- Former names: New Jones Beach Marine Stadium (1952–1953); Jones Beach Marine Theater (1954–1994); Jones Beach Amphitheater (1994–2000); Jones Beach Theater (2000–2002, 2017); Tommy Hilfiger at Jones Beach Theater (2002–2006); Nikon at Jones Beach Theater (2006–2016); Northwell Health at Jones Beach Theater (2017–2024)
- Address: 1000 Ocean Parkway; Wantagh, NY 11793-4800
- Location: Jones Beach State Park
- Coordinates: 40.60101°N 73.50232°W
- Owner: NYS OPRHP
- Operator: Live Nation Entertainment
- Seating type: outdoor ballpark styled chairs
- Capacity: 15,000
- Event: various

Construction
- Built: October 1949
- Opened: June 26, 1952
- Renovated: 1992; 2013; 2017; 2024
- Expanded: 1998; 2009
- Cost: $4 million ($54.1 million in 2025 dollars)
- Architect: Robert Moses

Website
- parks.ny.gov/parks/jonesbeach/

Northwell at Jones Beach Theater, known simply as Jones Beach Theater, is an outdoor amphitheatre partially built over the water of Zachs Bay at Jones Beach State Park in Wantagh, New York. It is one of three major outdoor arenas in the New York metropolitan area, along with Forest Hills Stadium in Queens, and the PNC Bank Arts Center near the Jersey Shore. JBT is managed by Live Nation Entertainment. The theater was designed to specifications provided by Robert Moses, who created Jones Beach State Park.

== History ==
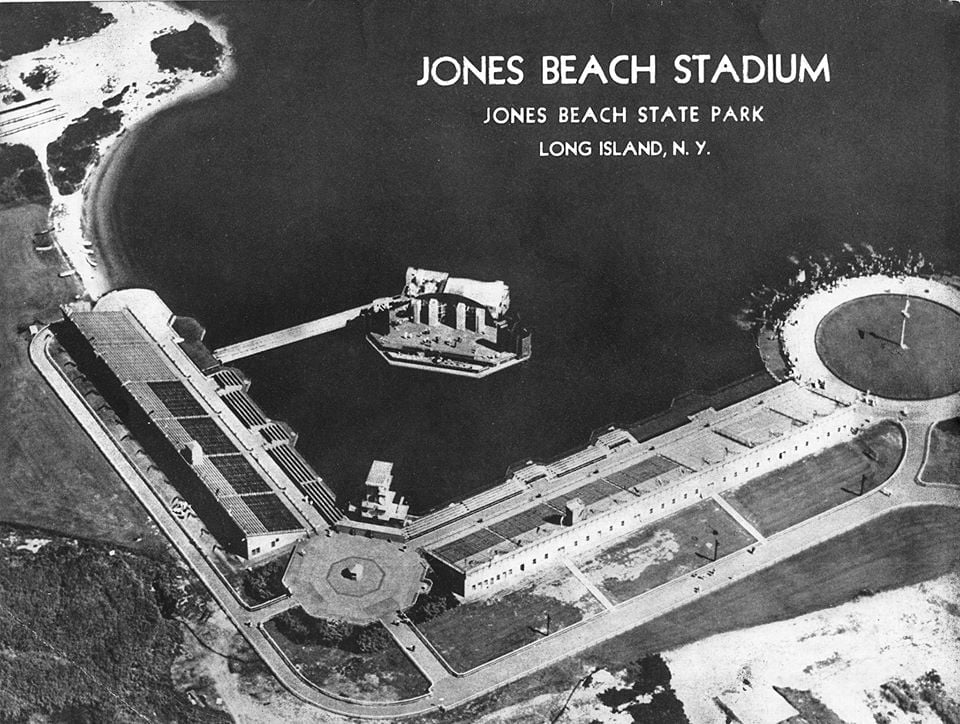
Original Jones Beach Marine Stadium 1930s

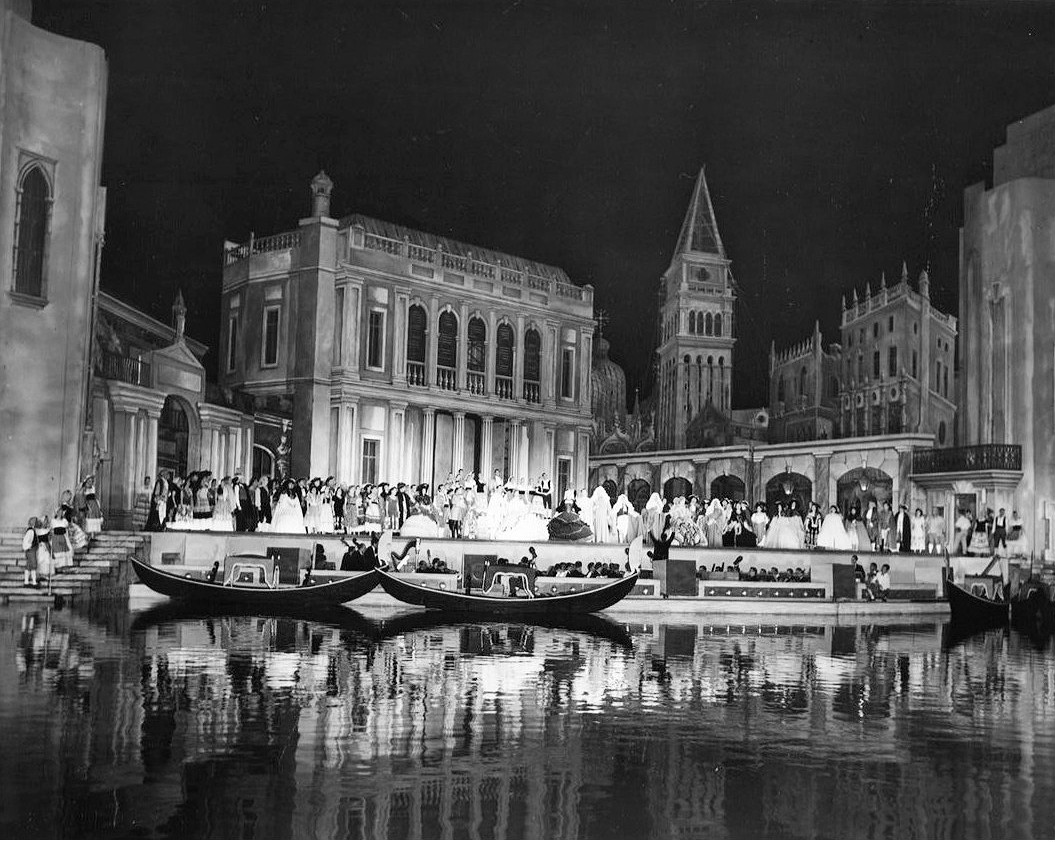
First act finale of the Mike Todd's staging of A Night in Venice

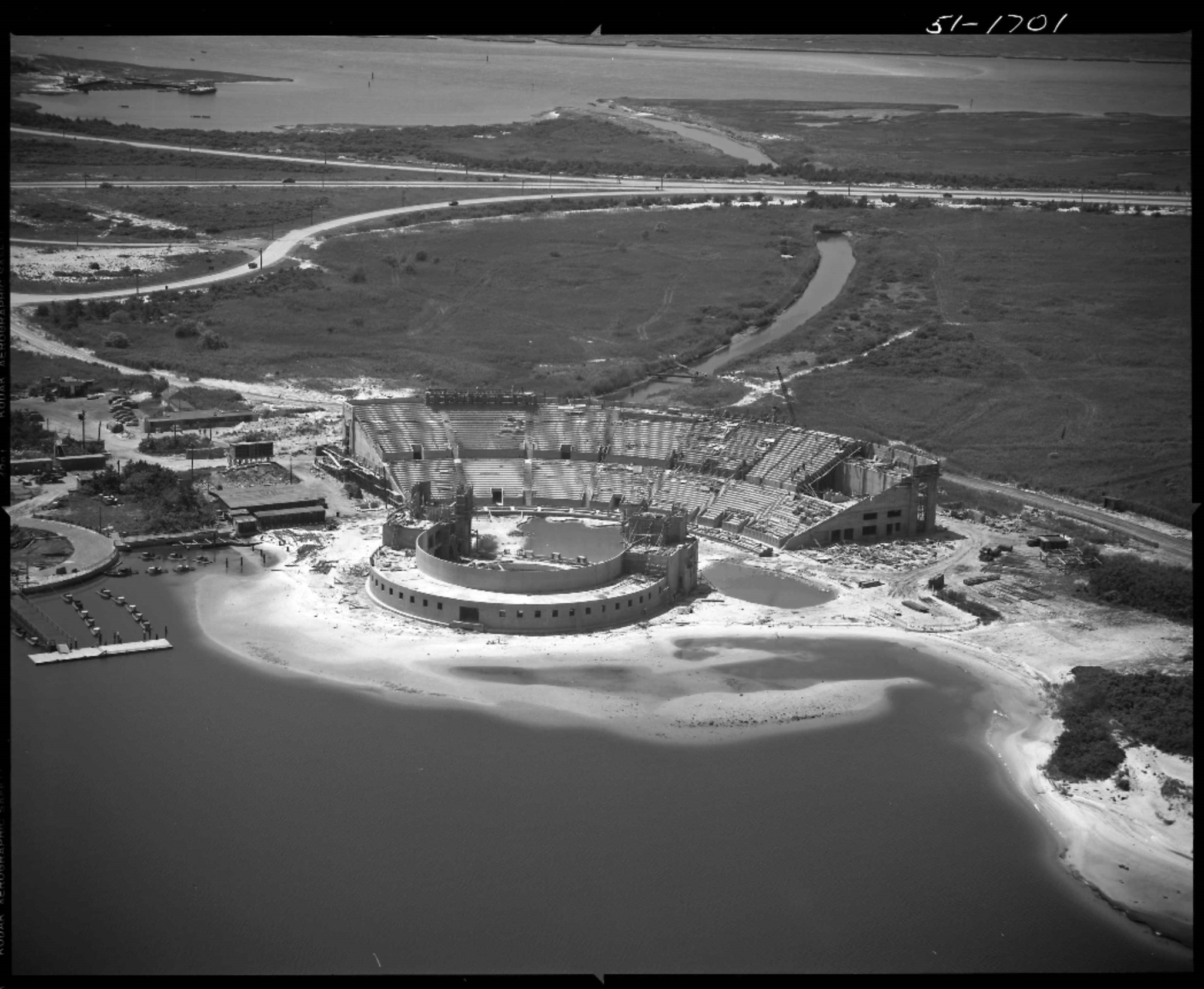
Jones Beach Theater Construction 1951

=== Musical era ===
In the 1930s, before the Robert Moses design, the original Jones Beach Marine Stadium was constructed as part of a Depression Era work relief program. Built over water, it developed a reputation as a venue for music and aquatic sports. In 1945, the temporary wooden structure was deemed unsafe and demolished. Construction of a new venue began on the same site in 1949 according to designs provided by Robert Moses. Sand was dredged between the theater and the stage to restore the water gap that had characterized the marine theater. The designs included an underwater tunnel between the theater and the backstage which still functions as of 2022.

Opened in June 1952 as the New Jones Beach Marine Stadium, the venue originally had 8,200 seats and hosted extravagant, often waterborne musicals. Film producer Mike Todd, as the venue's impresario for its first two seasons, unsuccessfully tried to court the La Scala opera company to use Jones Beach Theater as their summer home. The opening show was an elaborate staging of the operetta A Night in Venice by Johann Strauss II, complete with a revolving stage, fireworks, gondolas and floating set pieces. It broke box office records and starred Enzo Stuarti, Thomas Hayward, Norwood Smith and Nola Fairbanks. For an additional fee, this was followed by "Midnight Madness", a water circus aftershow featuring diving and water-skiing acts.

From 1954 to 1977, bandleader Guy Lombardo–at the invitation of his friend Robert Moses–produced numerous musicals at Jones Beach featuring elaborate floating sets and water features. The musicals were considered affordable and accessible for working-class families despite their million-dollar budgets. The performances rarely made a profit, but were still considered worthwhile by the Lombardo brothers. Lombardo was known to arrive at the venue by motorboat from his Freeport home, docking in the gap between the theater and stage. In 1954, the early phonograph recording star Billy Murray died of a heart attack while attending a Lombardo production of Arabian Nights at the theater.

Lombardo's final show was the 1977 production of Finian's Rainbow, with Christopher Hewett in the title role. After Lombardo's death in 1977, the series resumed in 1978 with Annie Get Your Gun, starring Lucie Arnaz. Beginning in the 1980s, the venue shifted primarily to concerts.

=== Concert era ===
In 1991 and 1992, under contract from concert promoter Ron Delsener, the theatre underwent an extensive renovation, adding a second level and increasing the capacity to 11,200 seats. The capacity was expanded again in 1998 to hold 15,000 seats.

In 2002, the company of clothing designer Tommy Hilfiger purchased the naming rights to the venue, renaming it "Tommy Hilfiger at Jones Beach Theater" for four years. On April 13, 2006, Tommy Hilfiger's company, under new ownership, declined its option to keep the company's name on the theater, and naming rights were purchased by the camera company Nikon, which renamed the venue "Nikon at Jones Beach Theater".

For a time the venue had a strict no-alcohol policy except in designated VIP boxes located behind the orchestra and the VIP tent area. Separate additional tickets are required to enter a VIP tent area.

In 2009, Jones Beach introduced The Bay Stage, which has a general admission capacity of 5,000. The performances are staged behind the concessions on the theater property. The theater property is located a short distance from the VIP area but The Bay Stage events cannot be viewed or heard from the VIP area.

In October 2012, Hurricane Sandy did major damage to the theater. Various structures were destroyed and much of the lower part of the arena was flooded, including the lower section of seats which were flooded more than halfway up. The venue reopened on May 31, 2013, after a $20 million rehabilitation project.

In January 2017, Jones Beach Theater undertook another renovation which added LED lighting, more cafes, and larger concourses. Nikon's naming rights contract expired at the end of 2016, and in February 2017, New York health system Northwell Health purchased the naming rights to the venue, renaming it the Northwell Health at Jones Beach Theater.

== See also ==
- List of contemporary amphitheatres
