= For Liberty and Union =

- Directed by: John K. Ball
- Written by: Kevin Tobin
- Produced by: Larry Keating; Ellis Dungan
- Starring: Dan Resin
- Narrated by: Gary Merrill
- Cinematography: A. J. Lhota
- Edited by: John P. Kenny
- Production company: Larry Keating/Ellis Dungan Production
- Release date: 1977 (West Virginia Independence Hall)
- Running time: ~20 minutes
- Country: United States
- Language: English

For Liberty and Union is a 1977 historical docudrama film.

== Plot ==
At the 1861 Wheeling Convention, delegates from Northwestern Virginia decided to break away from the Confederacy during the Civil War and become a new state.

== Cast ==
- Dan Resin as John Carlile
- Brooks Rogers as Waltman Willey
- William Lyman as Archibald Campbell
- David Judy as Francis Pierpont
- Bob Tracey as Samuel Crane
- Marilyn Hill as Mary Crane
- Hal O’Leary as John Nicholls

== Production ==
For Liberty and Union was sponsored by the West Virginia Independence Hall Foundation. Larry Keating was signed on to produce the film in 1977 as the restoration of the Independence Hall was nearing completion. The film was shot in the courthouse and custom house of the Independence Hall.

The film, which was originally a 16mm print, was preserved by the West Virginia State Archives via its preservation project and also received funds through the NFPF grant program.

== Release and reception ==
The film is showcased daily at the West Virginia Independence Hall.

Steve Stephens, writing for The Columbus Dispatch in 2013, wrote that For Liberty and Union "shows its age, but it still presents the statehood story in a clear and engaging fashion".
