= Hail (1972 film) =

Hail!
- Directed by: Fred Levinson
- Screenplay by: Phil Dusenberry and Larry Spiegel
- Starring: Dan Resin; Richard B. Shull; Dick O'Neill
- Release date: 1973
- Running time: 85 minutes
- Country: USA

Hail! (aka Hail to the Chief, Mr. President, Washington, B.C) is an American political comedy film directed 1970-1971 by Fred Levinson to a screenplay by Phil Dusenberry and Larry Spiegel. The film was screened 1972, but not released until 1973.

== Plot ==
Made during the administration of President Richard Nixon, the movie follows a presidential adviser who learns that the Chief Executive is jailing and persecuting others who oppose his strict mandates.

== Cast ==
- Dan Resin as The U.S. President
- Richard B. Shull as The Secretary of Health
- Dick O'Neill as The Attorney General
- Joseph Sirola Reverend Jimmy Williams
- Patricia Ripley as The First Lady
- Gary Sandy as Tom Goodman
- Willard Waterman as Vice President
