= Have a Heart (film) =

1934 film by David Butler

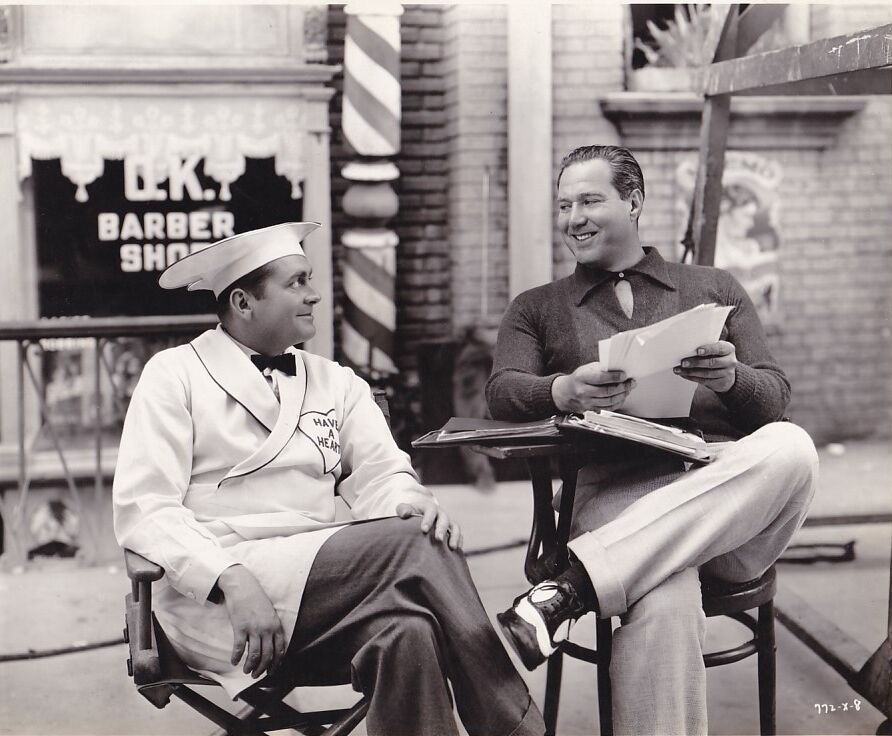
- James Dunn (left) and David Butler on the set of Have a Heart
- Directed by: David Butler
- Screenplay by: Florence Ryerson; Edgar Allan Woolf
- Story by: Buddy DeSylva; David Butler
- Produced by: John W. Considine Jr.
- Starring: Jean Parker; James Dunn; Una Merkel; Stuart Erwin; Willard Robertson
- Cinematography: James Wong Howe
- Edited by: Ben Lewis
- Music by: R.H. Bassett
- Production company: Metro-Goldwyn-Mayer
- Distributed by: Loew's Inc.
- Release date: September 7, 1934
- Running time: 80 minutes
- Country: United States
- Language: English

Have a Heart is a 1934 American drama film directed by David Butler and written by Florence Ryerson and Edgar Allan Woolf. The film stars Jean Parker, James Dunn, Una Merkel, Stuart Erwin and Willard Robertson. The film was released on September 7, 1934, by Metro-Goldwyn-Mayer.

== Plot ==
Sally is a dance teacher who, right before her wedding, has her leg crippled in an accident. Her fiancé breaks off the engagement. She begins a new job making dolls in her home, and sits by her window as she works. From her window seat she meets Jimmie, who sells Have-a-Heart ice cream pops to neighborhood children. The couple fall in love.

When she learns that Jimmie has been accused of stealing $400 from work Sally takes most of the money she's been saving for an operation and gives it to Jimmie's boss. When Jimmie learns what Sally has done he is upset that she appears to believe he is guilty, so he decides to end their romance.

The real thief is caught, and Sally has her money returned to her, so she is able to have the operation, but she lacks the will to relearn how to walk. Jimmie returns, giving her the motivation to recover, and the couple are married.

== Cast ==
- Jean Parker as Sally Moore
- James Dunn as James 'Jimmie' Flaherty
- Una Merkel as Joan O'Day
- Stuart Erwin as Gus Anderson
- Willard Robertson as Mr. Schauber
- Samuel S. Hinds as Dr. Spear
- Paul Page as Joe Lacy
- Muriel Evans as Helen
- Kate Price as Mrs. Kelly
- Pepi Sinoff as Mrs. Abrahams

== Production ==
Eighteen child performers from the Meglin School were in the cast.
