= Ralph Jacobus Fairbanks =

American prospector, entrepreneur, and pioneer

- Born: December 26, 1857; Payson, Utah, U.S.
- Died: October 3, 1943 (aged 85); Hollywood, California, U.S.
- Spouse: Celestia Adelaide Johnson (m. 1877; died 1938)
- Children: 11 (3 deceased)
- Relatives: Nola Fairbanks (granddaughter); Matthew Modine (great-grandson)

Ralph Jacobus Fairbanks (December 26, 1857 – October 3, 1943) was an American prospector, entrepreneur, and pioneer who established several towns in the Death Valley area of California, including Fairbanks Springs (1904–05), Shoshone (1910), and Baker (1929).

== Early life ==
Fairbanks was born to Mormon pioneer parents David and Susan Mandeville Fairbanks in Payson, Utah, on December 26, 1857.

== Career ==
He was a descendant of Jonathan Fairbanks. He followed a job with the railroad at start of the 20th century south to Las Vegas, Nevada, and eventually moved his family to Death Valley.

Earlier in 1883, Fairbanks had been among those called by John Taylor to start a new settlement in the Sevier Valley.

R. J. "Dad" Fairbanks, as he was known to locals, built businesses and towns throughout the region and built the first Standard Oil service station in the area, in Baker. He was known for saving tourists and prospectors who wandered into the desert, and also recovered bodies of unlucky travelers.

== Personal life ==
He married Celestia Adelaide Johnson in 1877 and had eleven children. Only eight survived to adulthood.

When Fairbanks was in his 70s, he moved to Santa Paula, California, with his wife Celeste to live with their youngest daughter, Zella Modine, and her family. Celeste died in 1938 and Ralph moved to Hollywood, California, with Zella and granddaughter Nola Fairbanks. Ralph died on October 3, 1943, at the Hollywood Nursing Home. His great-grandson is actor Matthew Modine.

Though his parents and wife were Members of the church of Jesus Christ of Latter-Day Saints, Fairbanks was never a devout member of the religion.
