= The Big Revue (film) =

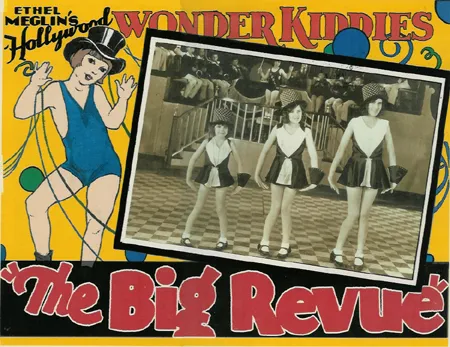
- Lobby card
- Directed by: Murray Roth
- Produced by: Gordon Hollingshead
- Starring: The Gumm Sisters; The Meglin Kiddies
- Music by: Milton Ager
- Production companies: Mayfair Pictures; Warner Bros. Pictures
- Distributed by: Warner Bros.
- Release date: September 14, 1929 (Fox Belmont Theater)
- Country: United States
- Language: English

The Big Revue, also titled as The Starlet Revue, is a 1929 American musical short film produced by Warner Bros. Pictures as part of their Vitaphone Varieties series. Directed by Murray Roth, the film features a cast of young performers, including The Gumm Sisters—a vaudeville trio that included a seven-year-old Frances Gumm, who would later change her name to Judy Garland. The short film is particularly notable for marking Garland's screen debut.

== Plot ==
The Big Revue consists of a series of song and dance numbers performed by a cast of child entertainers. In the vaudeville-inspired format, the young performers take turns showcasing musical acts that reflect the lively entertainment style of the late 1920s. Among the featured performances, The Gumm Sisters deliver a musical number that introduces audiences to Garland's early singing talent. Other child performers, including The Meglin Kiddies, also contribute to the revue-style presentation.

== Production ==
As part of Warner Bros.' Vitaphone Varieties series, The Big Revue was created during a transitional period in Hollywood when synchronized sound was becoming standard in filmmaking. Warner Bros. was at the forefront of this shift, having pioneered the use of synchronized sound in feature films with The Jazz Singer (1927). The Big Revue was one of several short films used to showcase this new technology, helping to integrate sound into cinematic entertainment beyond feature-length productions.

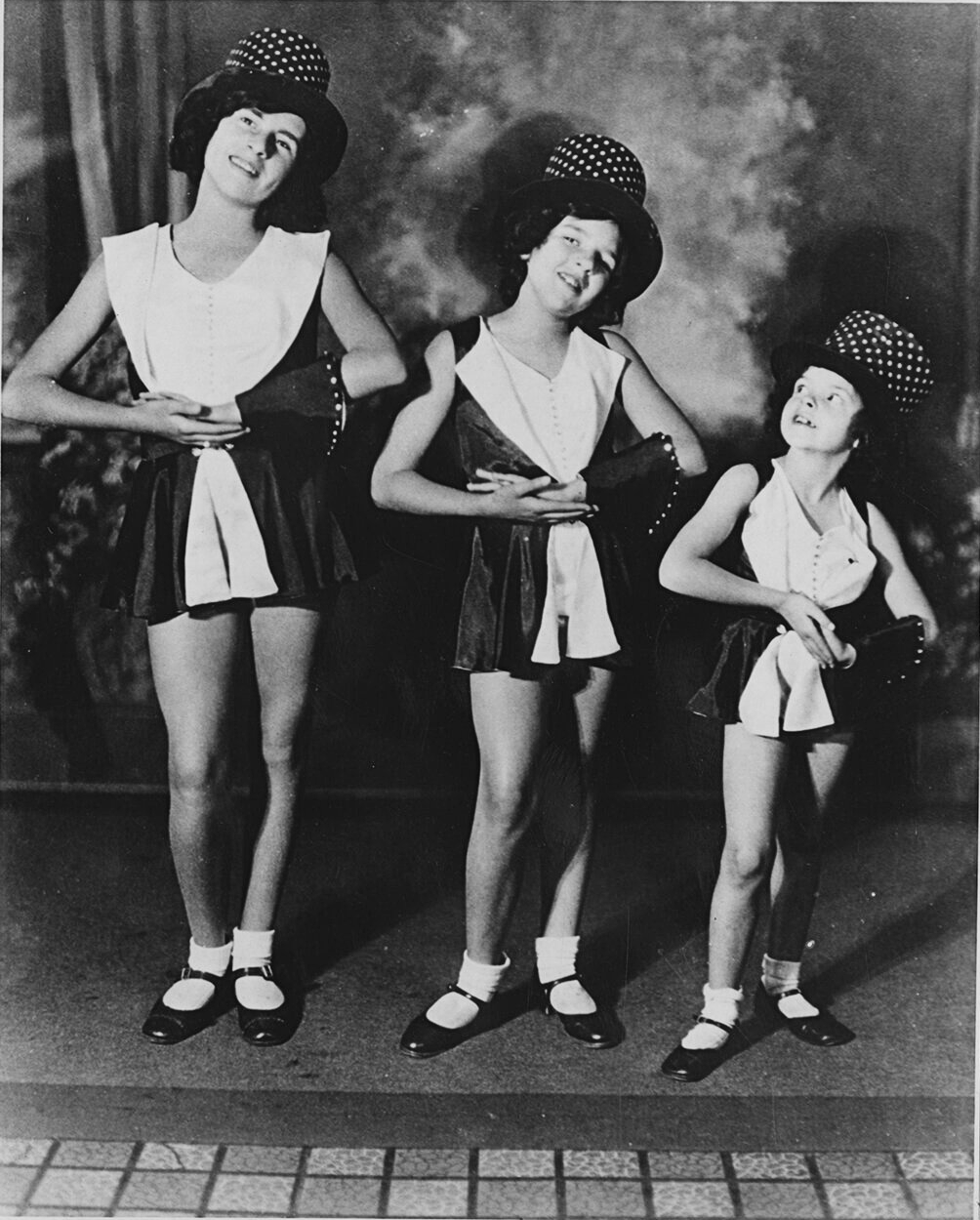
The Gumm Sisters performing in The Big Revue

The film was directed by Murray Roth, a filmmaker known for his work on short musical comedies. It was produced using the Vitaphone sound-on-disc system, which synchronized recorded dialogue and music with the film's visuals—a key advancement in cinema at the time.

== Cast ==
- Judy Garland – in her screen debut, performing as part of The Gumm Sisters.
- Dorothy Virginia Gumm – sister of Judy Garland and member of The Gumm Sisters.
- Mary Jane Gumm – sister of Judy Garland and member of The Gumm Sisters.
- The Meglin Kiddies – a troupe of young dancers.
- Additional child performers – various unnamed acts included in the revue.

== Reception and legacy ==
At the time of its release, The Big Revue was primarily seen as part of Warner Bros.' push to popularize sound films. While it did not receive widespread attention on its own, it holds historical significance today for marking the film debut of Judy Garland, who would later become one of Hollywood's most celebrated performers.

Garland's participation in The Big Revue is often referenced in retrospectives of her career, as it provides an early glimpse of the talent that would define her later success. Although the short film is not widely known today, it remains an important artifact of early sound cinema and vaudeville-influenced filmmaking.

== See also ==
- Vitaphone
- Judy Garland filmography
- Sound film
