= La Fiesta de Santa Barbara =

1935 film

- Title card
- Directed by: Louis Lewyn
- Produced by: Pete Smith; Lewis Lewyn
- Cinematography: Ray Rennahan
- Color process: Technicolor
- Distributed by: Metro-Goldwyn-Mayer
- Release date: December 7, 1935
- Running time: 19 minutes
- Country: United States
- Languages: English; Spanish

La Fiesta de Santa Barbara is a 1935 American comedy short film directed by Louis Lewyn. It was nominated for an Academy Award at the 9th Academy Awards in 1936 for Best Short Subject (Color). It features a 13-year-old Judy Garland singing "La Cucaracha" with her two sisters (billed as The Garland Sisters).

== Summaries ==
Hollywood stars participate in a Mexican-themed revue and festival in Santa Barbara. Andy Devine, the "World's Greatest Matador", engages in a bullfight with a dubious bovine supplied by Buster Keaton, and musical numbers are provided by Joe Morrison and The Garland Sisters. Comedy bits and dance numbers are also featured.

== Preservation status ==
La Fiesta de Santa Barbara has been preserved due to its historical and cultural significance, particularly as an example of early color cinematography. The film was selected for the National Film Registry by the Library of Congress, which has prompted further preservation efforts to maintain both original film elements and restored versions. The inclusion in the registry underscores its value and encourages ongoing efforts to prevent deterioration from aging film stock and fading Technicolor prints. The short film has also been made available on home media, which has helped it reach a wider audience and maintain relevance in popular culture. It appears as a "special feature" on select DVD and Blu-ray compilations that focus on classic Hollywood shorts, early color films, and MGM retrospectives.

== Cast ==
- Pete Smith as himself, Narrator (voice)
- Eduardo Durant's Rhumba Band as Themselves
- The Spanish Troubadors as Themselves
- The Fanchonettes as Themselves
- The Garland Sisters as Themselves
- Kirby and DeGage as Themselves
- Dude Ranch Wranglers as Themselves
- Warner Baxter as himself
- Chester Conklin as himself
- Mary Carlisle as herself
- Cecilia Parker as herself
- Ralph Forbes as himself
- Shirley Ross as herself
- Rosalind Keith as herself
- Ida Lupino as herself
- Toby Wing as herself
- Edmund Lowe as himself
- Gilbert Roland as himself
- Binnie Barnes as herself
- Robert Taylor as himself
- Harpo Marx as himself
- Andy Devine as himself
- Buster Keaton as himself
- Irvin S. Cobb as himself
- Joe Morrison as himself
- Maria Gambarelli as herself
- Gary Cooper as himself
- Ted Healy as himself
- Leo Carrillo as himself
- Adrienne Ames as herself
- Steffi Duna as herself
- Paul Porcasi as himself

== Reception ==
In April 1936, Variety reviewed the film positively noting that it "has enough singing, dancing and humor to attract attention aside from a slick color job". They also highlight the quality dialog, comedy by Keaton, Devine, Healy, and Cobb, and "a skillful intermingling of pretty girls".
