= Bubbles (film) =

1930 film

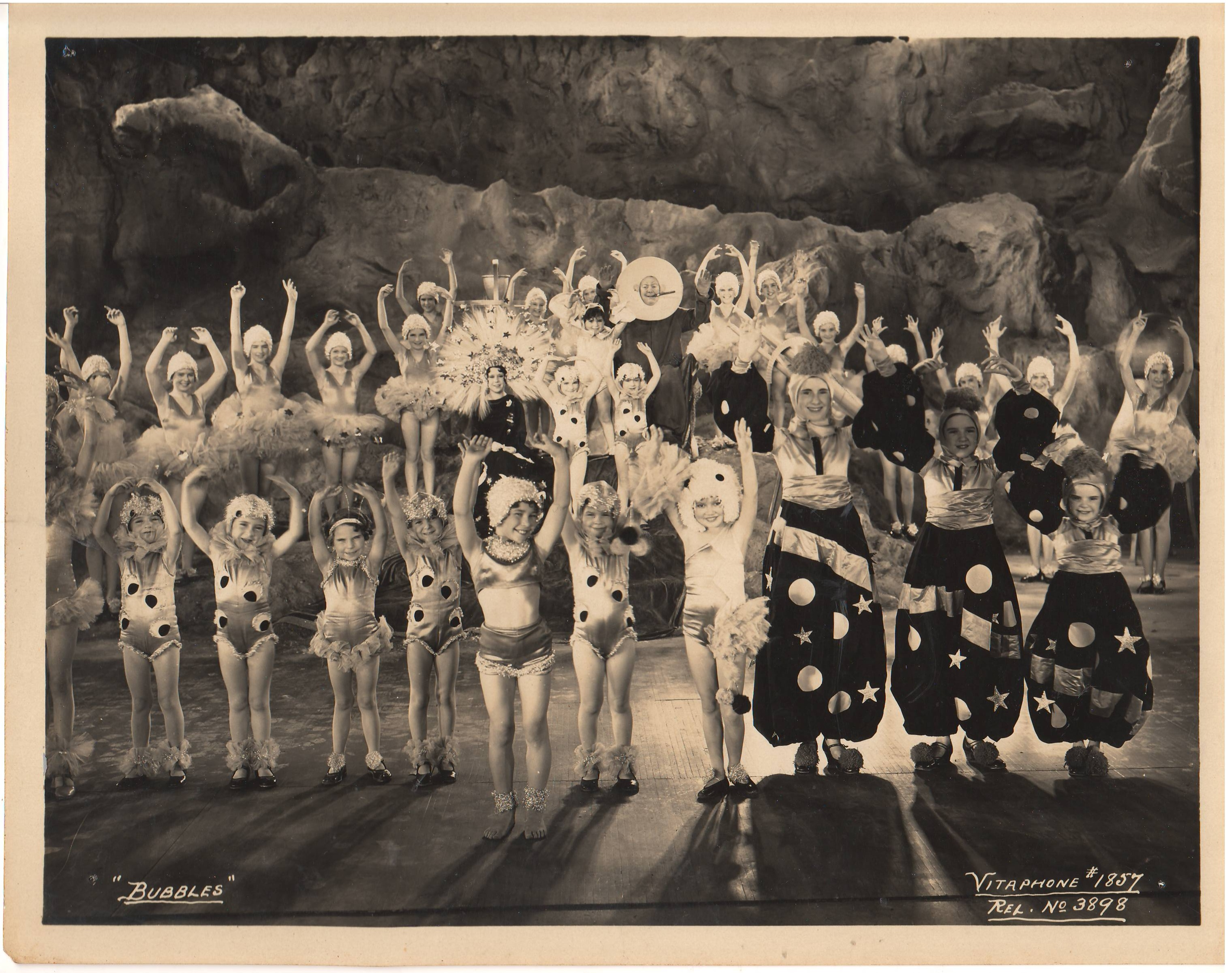
- A still from the 1930 Vitaphone Varieties short "Bubbles"
- Directed by: Roy Mack
- Starring: The Gumm Sisters; Marjorie Kane
- Cinematography: Howard Green; Willard Van Enger
- Music by: M.K. Jerome; Harold Berg
- Distributed by: Warner Bros.
- Release date: August 1930
- Running time: 9 minutes
- Country: United States
- Language: English

Bubbles is a 1930 American Vitaphone Varieties short film released by Warner Bros. in Technicolor. It was filmed in December 1929 at the First National Pictures studio with Western Electric apparatus, an early sound-on-film system, Rel. No. 3898. Bubbles is one of the earliest surviving recordings of Judy Garland on film, at 8 years old.

== Content ==
The short

A Vitaphone short film directed by Roy Mack, Bubbles features a land of make-believe where The Vitaphone Kiddies perform seven short singing, dancing and acrobatic acts. The opening act is Marjorie Kane singing "My Pretty Bubble". The second act is Judy Garland and her two older sisters, then known collectively as The Gumm Sisters, singing "In the Land of Let's Pretend", a song from Warner Bros' 1929 film On with the Show!, with Garland singing a short solo. The third act is one of the Vitaphone Kiddies singing the song "Miss Wonderful" from Paris. The next is a tap dancing number in ballet pointe shoes to "My Pretty Bubble". The fifth is a Vitaphone kiddie singing "Go Find Somebody to Love" from Little Johnny Jones. The following act is an acrobatic act to "My Pretty Bubble". The finale is a tap dance to "Lady Luck" from The Show of Shows.

== Cast ==
- Judy Garland as herself
- Mary Jane Gumm as herself
- Dorothy Virginia Gumm as herself
- Marjorie Kane as Mother in Checkered Dress
- The Vitaphone Kiddies as Themselves

== Preservation status ==
This short film now exists in black and white through copies made for television syndication, and was included as an extra on the 2004 deluxe DVD edition of Meet Me in St. Louis (1944).

Bubbles was one of the shorts included in the 1994 LaserDisc version of Judy Garland - The Golden Years at M-G-M. The audio from the movie of Garland's song is included in the 2010 CD set Judy Garland – Lost Tracks 1929 - 1959.
