= Frank Nastasi =

American actor and comedian (1923–2004)

Frank Nastasi (January 7, 1923 – June 15, 2004) was an actor and comedian best known for his work with Soupy Sales on the show Lunch with Soupy.

Born in Detroit, Michigan, Nastasi played Gramps the animal expert on Wixie Wonderland before he took over Clyde Adler's role on Lunch with Soupy, playing characters like White Fang, Black Tooth, Pookie, and Hippy. Nastasi also appeared with Sammy Davis Jr. in Golden Boy.

Nastasi died of a brain tumor in 2004.
