= The Meglin Kiddies =

American children's performing arts group

The Meglin Kiddies was an American troupe of acting, music and dance performers, consisting of children up to the age of 16. It was also known as The Meglin Professional Children's School, The Meglin Dance Studio, Meglin's Dance School, and Meglin's Wondrous Hollywood Kiddies.

== Background ==
The troupe was started by Ethel Meglin in 1928. Meglin was a Ziegfeld girl in feature films. Director/actor and Slapstick Keystone King Mack Sennett was supportive of the formation of the troupe's studio. Sennett donated a Meglin Kiddie studio building sign and assisted in securing an operations location on his lot. The Johnny Grant Building at 7018-7024 Hollywood Blvd once housed the Meglin Dance Studio on its second floor.

One of the most successful child stars of all time, Shirley Temple, was a Meglin Kiddie dancer when she was recruited for her first movie role: During a visit to the Meglin Kiddie studio, Charles Lamont, a director from Educational Pictures, chose Temple, hiding under the piano, for a part in a movie that he was about to direct."

Superstar Judy Garland was also a Meglin Kiddie. Garland's mother, Ethel Gumm, played the piano at the Meglin Kiddie studio to help pay for Garland's singing and dancing lessons there. The film debut of Judy Garland was in Meglin Kiddie short films. Garland also performed with the Meglin Kiddies over the radio, and live at theaters such as: Shrine Auditorium, Pantages Theatre (Hollywood), and Loew's State Theater in Los Angeles, California.

In the 1950s, the Meglin Kiddies had a television show.

Ethel Meglin retired in 1962, as did the studio and dance troupe.

== Filmography ==
- The Big Revue (1929) — AKA "The Meglin Kiddie Revue" & AKA "The Starlet Revue"—with Judy Garland (Francis Gumm & Sisters)
- The Land of Oz (1932) — Production company and actors/dancers (Film adapted from the book, Land of Oz)
- Show Kids (1934)
- In Love with Life (1934) — Floor show performers at the Kiddie Kabaret
- Too Many Parents (uncredited) (1936) — Themselves
- Roarin’ Lead (1936) — Dancers
- Maytime (1937) — Children In Maypole Number
- The Wizard of Oz (1939) — Munchkin child actors and dancers
- Reg’lar Fellers (1941) — Billy Lee's Band --Associate Producer: Ethel Meglin

== Notable Meglin Kids ==
In alphabetical order:

- Scotty Beckett
- Jackie Cooper
- Roland Dupree
- Nola Fairbanks
- Judy Garland
- Kathy Garver
- Farley Granger
- Virginia Grey
- Darryl Hickman
- Dwayne Hickman
- June Lang
- Billy Lee
- Cherylene Lee
- Virginia Lee
- Paul Marco
- Mary McCarty
- Ann Miller
- Sidney Miller
- June Preston
- Mickey Rooney
- Peggy Ryan
- Melody Thomas Scott
- Betta St. John
- Shirley Temple
- Jane Withers
