= Soupy Sales =

American comedian and actor (1926–2009)

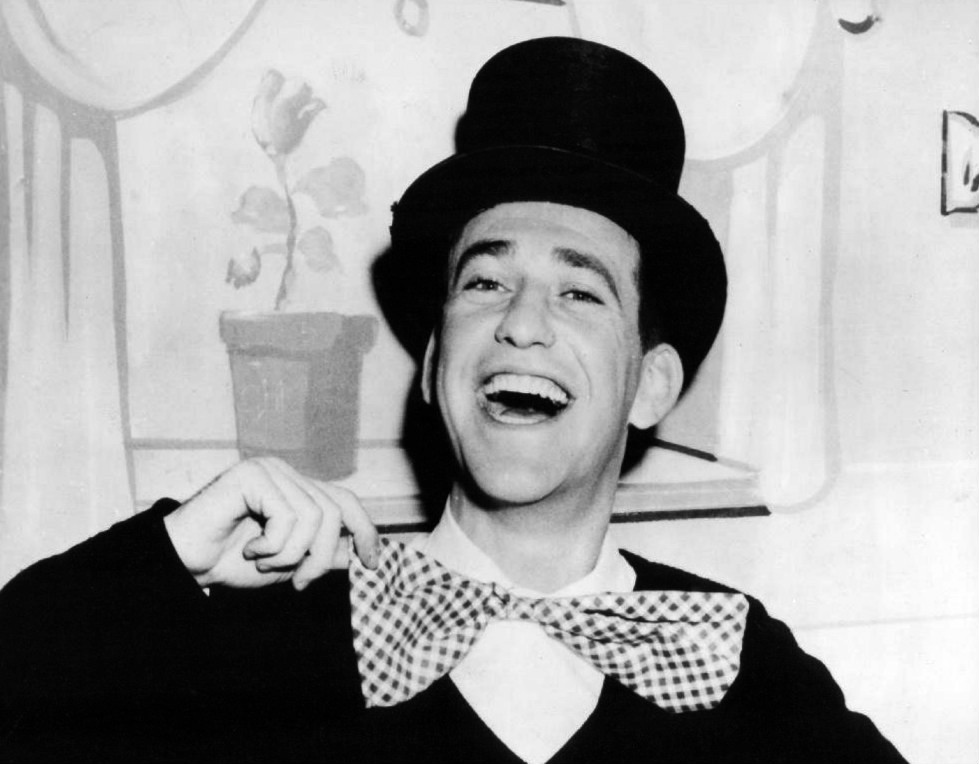
- Sales on Lunch with Soupy Sales in 1960
- Born: Milton Supman; January 8, 1926; Franklinton, North Carolina, U.S.
- Died: October 22, 2009 (aged 83); New York City, U.S.
- Notable work: Lunch with Soupy Sales
- Spouses: Barbara Fox (m. 1950; div. 1979); Trudy Carson (m. 1980)
- Children: Hunt Sales; Tony Sales

Comedy career
- Years active: 1949–2009
- Medium: Television; radio; film
- Genres: Slapstick, word play, improvisation

Milton Supman (January 8, 1926 – October 22, 2009), known professionally as Soupy Sales, was an American comedian, actor, radio-television personality, and jazz aficionado. He was best known for his local and network children's television series, Lunch with Soupy Sales (later titled The Soupy Sales Show) (1953–1966), a series of comedy sketches frequently ending with Sales receiving a pie in the face, which became his trademark. From 1968 to 1975 he was a regular panelist on the syndicated revival of What's My Line? and appeared on several other TV game shows. During the 1980s, he hosted his own radio show on WNBC in New York City.

== Early life ==
Milton Supman was born in Franklinton, North Carolina, to Irving Supman (Yiddish: אירווינג סופּמאַן) and Sadie Berman Supman (Yiddish: סיידי בערמאַן סופּמאַן). His father, a Jewish dry goods merchant, emigrated from Hungary in 1894. His was the only Jewish family in town; Sales joked that local Ku Klux Klan members bought the sheets used for their robes from his father's store.

According to an interview with the Television Foundation, his nickname originated in his youth from a mispronunciation of his last name, Supman, as "Soupman" and "Soupbone", being shortened to "Soupy".

When he became a disc jockey, he began using the stage name Soupy Hines. After he became established, it was decided that "Hines" was too close to the Heinz soup company, so he chose Sales, in part after vaudeville comedian Chic Sale. He graduated from Huntington High School in Huntington, West Virginia, in 1944. He enlisted in the United States Navy and served on USS Randall in the South Pacific during the latter part of World War II. He sometimes entertained his shipmates by telling jokes and playing crazy characters over the ship's public address system. One of the characters he created was "White Fang", a large dog that played outrageous practical jokes on the seamen. The sounds for "White Fang" came from a recording of The Hound of the Baskervilles.

Sales enrolled at Marshall University, known as Marshall College at that time, where he earned a master's degree in journalism. While there, he performed in nightclubs as a comedian, singer and dancer.

== Career ==
After graduating from Marshall, Sales began working as a scriptwriter and disc jockey at radio station WHTN (now WVHU) in Huntington. He moved to Cincinnati, Ohio, in 1949, where he was a morning radio DJ and performed in nightclubs. He began his television career on WKRC-TV in Cincinnati with Soupy's Soda Shop, TV's first teen dance program, and Club Nothing!, a late-night comedy/variety program.

=== Lunch with Soupy Sales ===
Sales is best known for his daily children's television show, Lunch with Soupy Sales. It was originally called 12 O'Clock Comics, and later known as The Soupy Sales Show. Improvised and slapstick in nature, it was a rapid-fire stream of comedy sketches, gags and puns, many of which resulted in Sales receiving a pie in the face, which became his trademark. He developed pie-throwing into an art form: straight to the face, on top of the head, a pie to both ears from behind, moving into a stationary pie, and countless other variations. He claimed that he and his visitors had been hit by more than 20,000 pies during his career. He recounted a time when a young fan mistakenly threw a frozen pie at his neck and he "dropped like a pile of bricks".

==== Detroit ====
A hand puppet featuring a likeness of Sales

Lunch with Soupy Sales began in 1953 from the studios of WXYZ-TV, Channel 7, in the historic Maccabees Building in Detroit. Sales occasionally took the studio cameras to the lawn of the Detroit Public Library, across the street from the studios, and talked with local students walking to and from school. Beginning no later than July 4, 1955, a Saturday version of Sales's lunch show was broadcast nationally on the ABC television network. His lunchtime program on weekdays was moved to early morning opposite Today and Captain Kangaroo.

During the same period that Lunch with Soupy Sales aired in Detroit, Sales also hosted a nighttime show, Soupy's On, to compete with 11 O'Clock News programs. The guest star was always a musician, often a jazz performer, at a time when jazz was popular in Detroit and the city was home to 24 jazz clubs. Sales believed his show helped sustain jazz in Detroit, as artists regularly sold out their nightclub shows after appearing on it.

Coleman Hawkins, Louis Armstrong, Duke Ellington, Billie Holiday, Charlie Parker and Stan Getz were among the musicians who appeared on the show; Miles Davis made six appearances. Clifford Brown's appearance on Soupy's On, according to Sales, may be the only extant footage of Brown, and has been included in Ken Burns' Jazz and an A&E Network biography about Sales.

Sales briefly had a third dinnertime show filmed largely in Detroit's Palmer Park area. His three shows were rumored to earn him in excess of $100,000 per year. One of his character puppets was Willy the Worm, a "balloon" propelled worm that emerged from its house and used a high pitched voice to announce birthdays or special events on the noontime show; but the character never appeared when Soupy moved to Los Angeles. In his lunchtime show, Sales always wore an orlon fabric sweater. In many of his shows, he appeared in costume, performed his dance, the Soupy Shuffle, introduced many characters such as Nicky Nooney, the Mississippi Gambler, etc., and took "zillions" of pies in the face.

==== Los Angeles ====
In 1960 Sales moved to the ABC-TV studios in Los Angeles. ABC canceled his show in March 1961, but it continued as a local program on KABC-TV until January 1962. It briefly went back on the ABC network as a late night fill-in for The Steve Allen Show in 1962, but was canceled after three months. All of the puppets on the show during its Los Angeles run were operated by Clyde Adler, whom a 1962 TV Guide listing describes as "West Coast disk jockey and comedian".

Sales' fame was significant enough that he was hired as a Tonight Show guest host in the period between Jack Paar and Johnny Carson.

==== New York ====
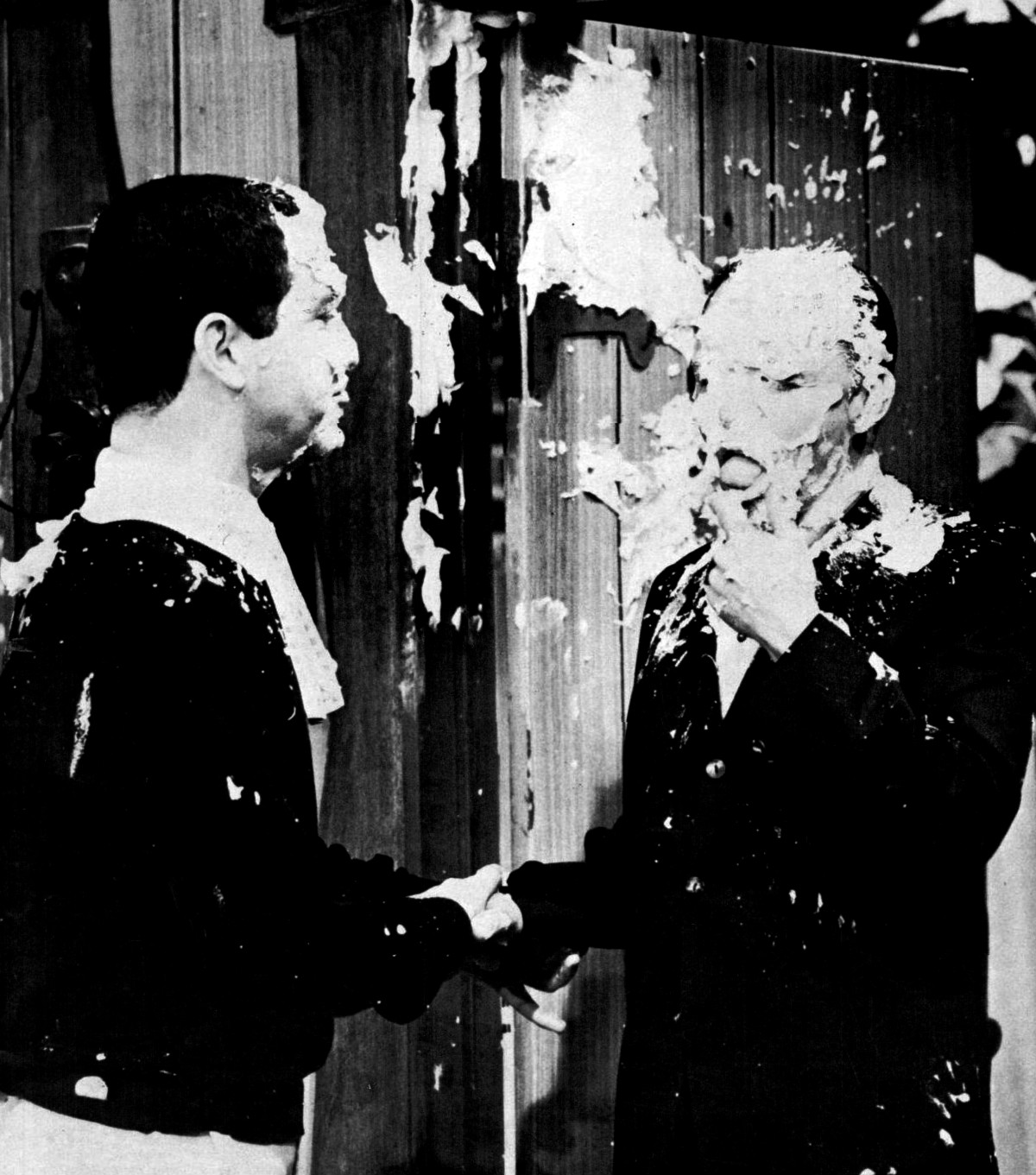
As Sales's guest, Frank Sinatra was no more immune to a pie in the face than his host.

On September 7, 1964, Sales found a new weekday home at WNEW-TV in New York City. This version was seen locally until September 2, 1966. Screen Gems syndicated 260 episodes to local stations outside the New York market during the 1965–66 season. This show marked the height of Sales's popularity. It featured guest appearances by stars such as Frank Sinatra, Tony Curtis, Jerry Lewis, Judy Garland and Sammy Davis Jr., as well as musical groups like the Shangri-Las, The Supremes and The Temptations. He was the subject of an article in the May 14, 1965, issue of LIFE.

==== The New Soupy Sales Show: Los Angeles ====
The New Soupy Sales Show appeared in 1978 with the same format, and ran for one season. 65 episodes were briefly syndicated, through Air Time International, to local stations in early 1979. It was taped in Los Angeles at KTLA, with Clyde Adler returning to work as a puppeteer with Sales.

=== Characters ===
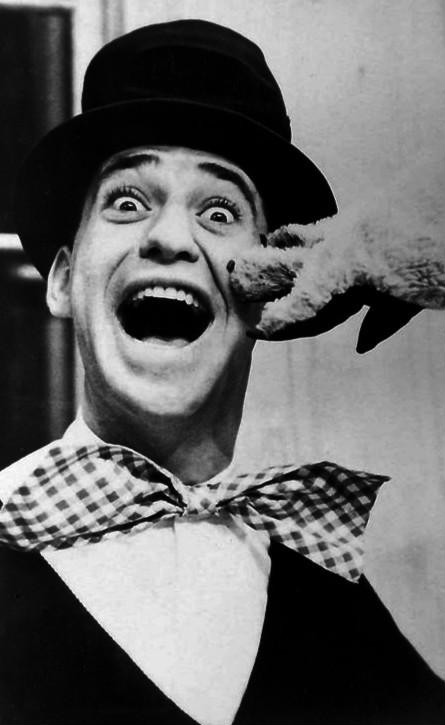
Sales with White Fang in 1957

Clyde Adler, the show's floor manager and a film editor at Detroit's WXYZ, performed in sketches and voiced and operated all puppets on Sales's show in Detroit in the 1950s and in Los Angeles from 1959 to 1962, as well as in 1978. Actor Frank Nastasi, who played the part of Gramps on WXYZ-TV's other kids' show Wixie Wonderland, assumed the role of straight man and puppeteer when Sales took the show to New York from 1964 to 1966. Nastasi was originally from Detroit and had worked with Sales at WXYZ. Appearing on the show were both puppets and live performers.

The puppets were:

- White Fang, "The Biggest and Meanest Dog in the USA", who appeared only as a giant white shaggy paw with black triangular felt "claws", jutting out from the corner of the screen. Fang spoke with unintelligible short grunts and growls, which Soupy repeated back in English, for comic effect. White Fang was often the pie thrower when Soupy's jokes bombed.
- Black Tooth, "The Biggest and Sweetest Dog in the USA", also seen only as a giant black paw with white triangular felt claws, and with more feminine, but similarly unintelligible, dialogue. Black Tooth's trademark was pulling Soupy off-camera to give loud and noisy kisses.
- For a short time there was a third dog character that became White Fang's girlfriend, Marilyn Monwolf. She caused some rivalry of affections between Black Tooth and White Fang, but later jilted them both for Joe Dogmaggio.
- Pookie the Lion, a lion puppet appearing in a large window behind Soupy (1950s), was a hipster with a rapier wit. For example: Soupy: "Do you know why my life is so miserable?" Pookie: "You got me!" Soupy: "That's why!" One of Pookie's favorite lines when greeting Soupy was, "Hey bubby... want a kiss?". In the Detroit shows, Pookie never spoke but communicated in whistles. That puppet also was used to mouth the words while pantomiming novelty records on the show.
- Hippy the Hippo, a minor character who occasionally appeared with Pookie the Lion. Frank Nastasi gave Hippy a voice for the New York shows. Clyde Adler also voiced Hippy in the shows done in the late 1970s.

==== New Year's Day incident ====
On January 1, 1965, miffed at having to work on the holiday, Sales ended his live broadcast by encouraging his young viewers to tiptoe into their still-sleeping parents' bedrooms and remove those "funny green pieces of paper with pictures of U.S. presidents" from their pants and pocketbooks. "Put them in an envelope and mail them to me and I'll send you a postcard from Puerto Rico", Sales instructed the children. Several days later substantial amounts of money had begun arriving in the mail; Sales stated that the total amount received was in the thousands of dollars but qualified that by stating that much of that was Monopoly or play money. Sales said he had been joking, and that whatever real money had been sent would be donated to charity, but as parents' complaints increased, WNEW's management suspended Sales for two weeks.

=== Records ===
One of the fans of the Soupy Sales show was Frank Sinatra. It appears Sinatra became a fan after his daughter Nancy begged him to visit the show. When Sinatra started his own record label, Reprise Records, he signed Sales to a recording contract, which produced two albums: The Soupy Sales Show in 1961 and Up in the Air in 1962.

Sales's novelty dance record, '"The Mouse", dates from the mid-1960s period of his career, when his show was based in New York. The single, released on the ABC-Paramount label, peaked at No. 76 on the Billboard Hot 100 chart in May 1965. Sales performed "The Mouse" on The Ed Sullivan Show in September 1965, just prior to The Beatles' segment on the show. In 1965, Soupy released a cover of the novelty song "Pakalafaka" (composed by Irving Taylor and originally performed by Earl Brown in 1958). Sales signed with Motown Records in 1969, releasing the single "Muck-Arty Park" (a play on the 1968 hit "MacArthur Park"), as well as the album A Bag of Soup. Soupy and Frank Nastasi also cut and recorded a comedy and song story disk, "Spy with a Pie", for ABC-Paramount. It was re-released by "Simon Says" children's records.

=== Game shows ===
From 1968 to 1975 Sales was a regular panelist on the syndicated revival of What's My Line? (He had been a guest panelist on one episode of the original version in 1965.) He was usually the first panelist introduced and occupied the chair on the far left side (facing the camera), next to Arlene Francis. In 1969, he appeared on Storybook Squares, a children's version of Hollywood Squares, as Henry VIII. In 1976, he hosted Junior Almost Anything Goes, ABC's Saturday morning version of their team-based physical stunt program. He was also a panelist on the 1980 revival of To Tell the Truth; he had appeared as a guest on the show during the mid- to late 1970s. Other game show appearances included over a dozen episodes of the original Match Game from 1966 to 1969 as well as one week of the revived version in 1976; a week of shows on the 1970s edition of The Gong Show; a couple of guest spots on Hollywood Squares (December 12, 1977, and April 4, 1978) and a few appearances on the combined version (Match Game-Hollywood Squares Hour) in 1983–84; and a recurring role in all versions of Pyramid from 1973 to 1988 and 1991 (in one famous episode of which he repeatedly uttered the word "bacon", trying to get a confused contestant to say "greasy things"); he also helped a contestant win the $50,000 grand prize on the 1981 incarnation of the show. He was considered as a host in Nickelodeon's game show, Double Dare, but was deemed too old (the job went to Marc Summers). He also made an appearance on Pictionary in 1997.

=== Radio show ===
Sales hosted a midday radio show on WNBC in New York from March 1985 to March 1987. His program was between the drive time shifts of Don Imus (morning) and Howard Stern (afternoon), with whom Sales had an acrimonious relationship. An example of this was an incident where Stern told listeners he was cutting the strings in Sales's in-studio piano at 4:05 p.m. on May 1, 1985. On December 21, 2007, Stern revealed this was a stunt staged for "theater of the mind" and to torture Sales; in truth, the piano was never harmed. Sales's on-air crew included his producer, Ray D'Ariano, newscaster Judy DeAngelis, and pianist Paul Dver.

=== Film ===
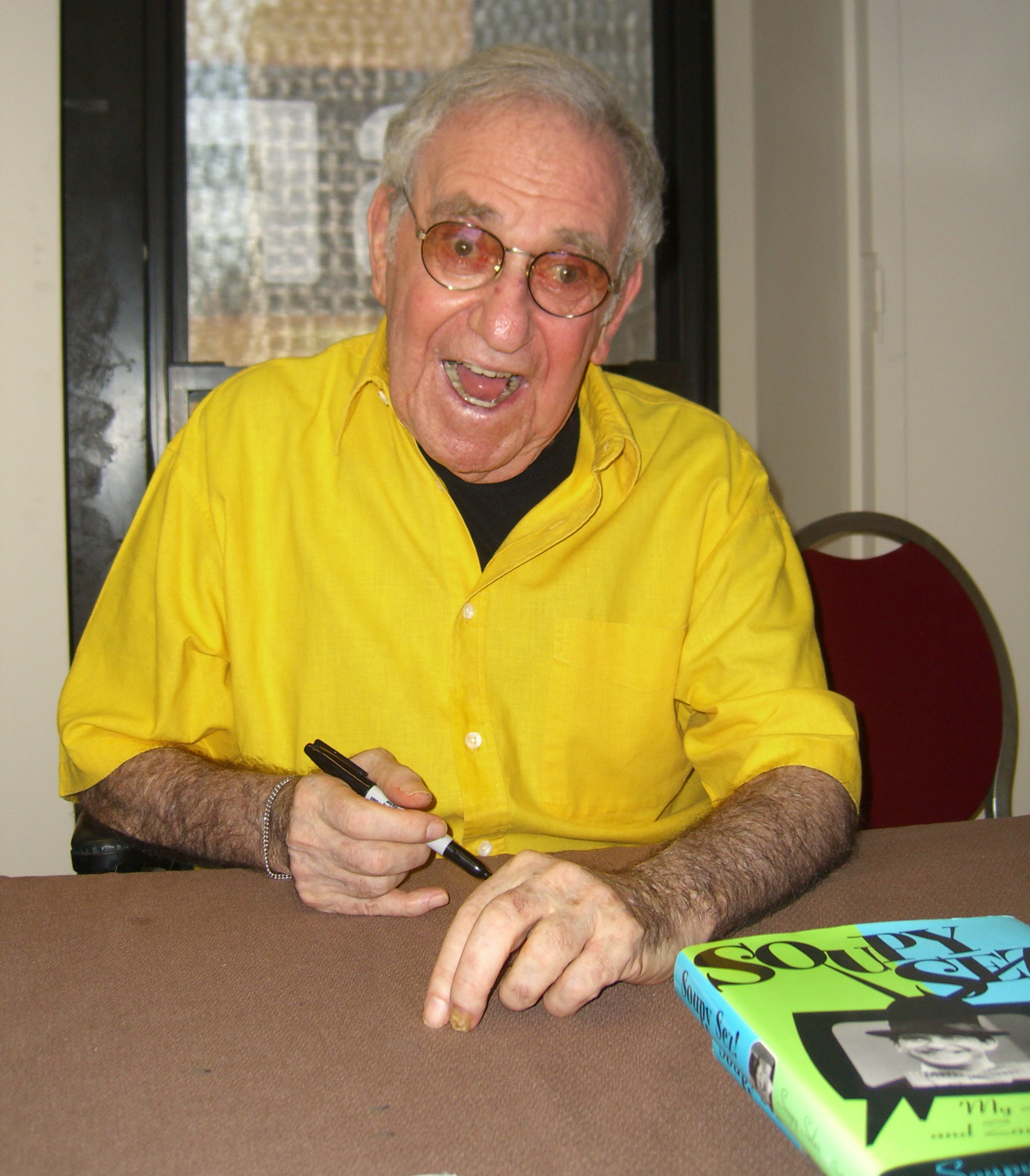
Sales autographing books at the Big Apple Convention in Manhattan, 2008

Sales had a sporadic film career that spanned over 40 years. Films in which Sales performed include:

- 1961 – The Two Little Bears
- 1963 – Critic's Choice
- 1966 – Birds Do It (starring role). Sales was vocal in his dislike for this film, writing in his autobiography that "it's now shown in six states as capital punishment."
- 1977 – Don't Push, I'll Charge When I'm Ready
- 1993 – The Making of... 'And God Spoke' - his memorable appearance as himself, hired by two incompetent filmmakers to portray Moses because Charlton Heston was not available.
- 1999 – Palmer's Pick Up
- 2000 – A Little Bit of Lipstick
- 2000 – Behind the Seams
- 2001 – This Train
- 2005 – The Innocent and the Damned
- 2005 – Angels with Angles

=== Television ===
- 1960 – The Rebel, Season 2, in Episode 9 ("The Legacy") as an unnamed stable owner and in Episode 15 ("The Hope Chest") as Meyers
- Sales appeared as himself in one of the later episodes of the CBS military sitcom/drama series Hennesey, starring Jackie Cooper
- Sales made several guest appearances on The Carol Burnett Show
- 1962 – Miss Teen USA pageant at Pacific Ocean Park in Santa Monica, California, where Sales hosted and crowned the winner (Linda Henning, 15, of Sioux Falls, South Dakota)
- 1962 – Ensign O'Toole, Season 1, Episode 5 ("Operation Jinx"), with Sales as Jinx Johnson
- 1963 – The Real McCoys, Episode 32 ("The McCoy Sound"), Sales played "Hank Salamanca", a musician guest at the fair
- 1964 – Route 66, Season 4, Episode 19 ("This is Going to Hurt Me More Than It Hurts You"), Route 66, Sales played Harlan Livingston III
- 1969 – The Beverly Hillbillies, Milburn Drysdale's nephew, Air Force ace Jet Bradford
- 1978–1981 – Sha Na Na, TV series
- 1982–1984 – Saturday Supercade, Sales provided the voice for the Nintendo character Donkey Kong, becoming the first actor to portray the character
- 1989 – Monsters, Season 2, Episode 6, as "Traveling Salesman"
- 1994 – Wings, Season 6, Episode 8 ("Miss Jenkins"), Sales played a character named Fred Gardner, and performed Simon Says with Lowell
- 2001 – Black Scorpion, super-villain Professor Prophet

== Personal life and death ==
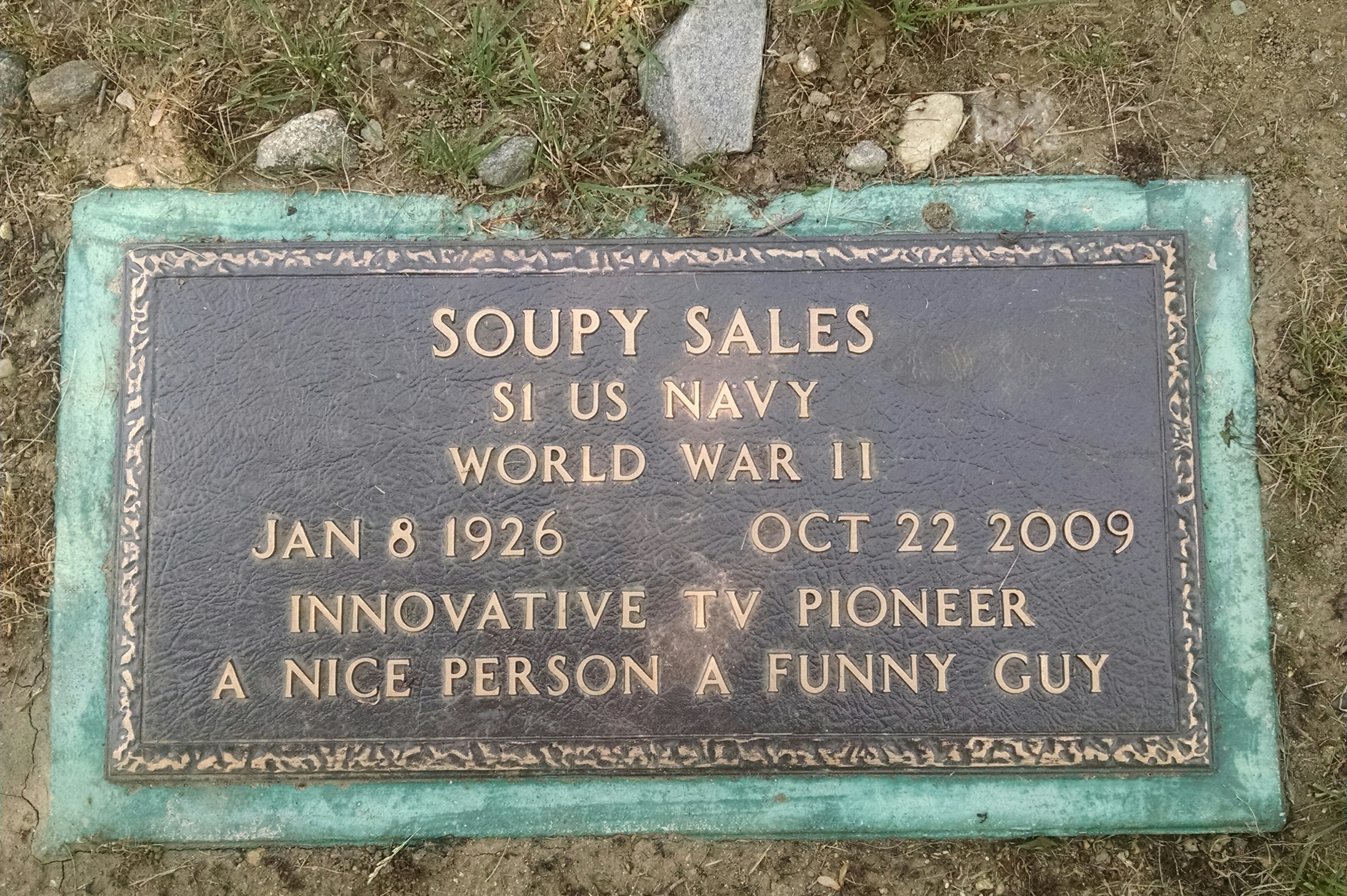

Sales was married twice: first to Barbara Fox, from 1950 until their divorce in 1979. They had two sons, both of whom are rock musicians: bassist Tony Sales and drummer Hunt Sales. (Note: The brothers were the rhythm section for Todd Rundgren in the early '70s, then for Iggy Pop starting in the mid-'70s, and later were half the band Tin Machine with David Bowie and Reeves Gabrels, from 1988 to 1992.) In 1980, Soupy Sales married dancer Trudy Carson, who survived him.

Sales died on October 22, 2009, at Calvary Hospice in Bronx, New York, aged 83, from cancer. He is buried at Kensico Cemetery in Valhalla, New York.

== Reruns ==
Janet Oseroff was Sales's manager in the last years of his life, and she continues to represent his estate with Sales's wife Trudy. They license reruns of over 100 shows, including the entirety of The New Soupy Sales Show and the extant episodes from Sales's earlier black-and-white shows. Sales's shows have aired since 2011 on Jewish Life Television and since 2013 on Retro Television Network, the latter airing once a week. As of 2026, JLTV offers a 24/7 free ad-supported streaming television channel devoted to Sales's programs.
