= Nola Fairbanks =

American actress (1924–2021)

- Born: Nola Jo Modine; December 10, 1924; Santa Paula, California, U.S.
- Died: February 8, 2021 (aged 96); Greenwich, Connecticut
- Spouse: James Larkin (1954 - 1990, divorced)
- Children: 4
- Relatives: Matthew Modine (nephew)

Nola Fairbanks (born Nola Jo Modine; December 10, 1924 – February 8, 2021) was an American actress. She was also the aunt of actor Matthew Modine.

== Early life ==
Fairbanks was born Nola Jo Modine in Santa Paula, California, on December 10, 1924, the daughter of Zella Vonola Fairbanks and Alexander Revard Modine. She is the granddaughter of Mormon pioneers Ralph Jacobus Fairbanks (aka R.J. "Dad" Fairbanks) and Celestia Adelaide (Johnson) Fairbanks, from Payson, Utah and Death Valley, California. She is a descendant of Jonathan Fairbanks, whose 17th century wood-frame house still stands in Dedham, Massachusetts.

As a child, she joined the Meglin Kiddies Dance Troupe where Shirley Temple was also a student. While her father, Alexander Revard Modine, worked for the Texaco Oil Company, Nola Jo's mother, Zella Vonola Fairbanks Modine, washed clothes to pay for her singing and dancing lessons during the Great Depression.

== Career ==
Her only movie role was as a "glorified extra" in The Corn Is Green in 1945, starring Bette Davis. Soon after, she joined the Lionel Barrymore production of the musical, Halloween at the Hollywood Bowl, and performed on The Standard Hour in addition to the Hollywood Canteen for servicemen.

Next, she went on tour as a soloist with the Sonja Henie Ice Show, completing two national tours. When the tours ended in New York, she stayed on with the show, named Howdy Mr. Ice at the Center Theatre in Rockefeller Center.

Her Broadway debut was in 1950 in the chorus of Cole Porter's Out of This World . She soon became an understudy and before long, assumed the lead. Summer stock performances included Miss Liberty with Dick Haymes in the Dallas Theatre as well as Die Fledermaus and finally Bloomer Girl in Toronto, Canada. Next, she joined the Broadway cast of Paint Your Wagon opposite James Barton, when Olga San Juan left the role of Jennifer Rumson. She took the show on tour with Burl Ives in the part of her father, Ben Rumson.

In 1952, she starred in the first musical production at the new Jones Beach Theatre in Long Island, New York. Mike Todd was the producer of this production of the Johann Strauss II operetta Eine Nacht in Venedig starring alongside Enzo Stuarti and Thomas Hayward.

After a winning performance on The Arthur Godfrey Radio Show, she appeared on his television show. Her final Broadway performance came when she was asked to replace Florence Henderson in the lead role in Fanny, co-starring Ezio Pinza.

She revived her career in 1978 with appearances in a short-lived sketch comedy TV series, Madhouse Brigade, produced by her husband. In 1981, he produced an off-Broadway show called Romance Is where Fairbanks performed with an ensemble cast. The show closed after a few performances.

== Personal life ==
Fairbanks married James Larkin in 1954 and had four children. They divorced in 1990. She died on February 8, 2021, at the age of 96, in Greenwich, Connecticut.
