= The Gumm Sisters =

American vaudeville group (1924–1935)

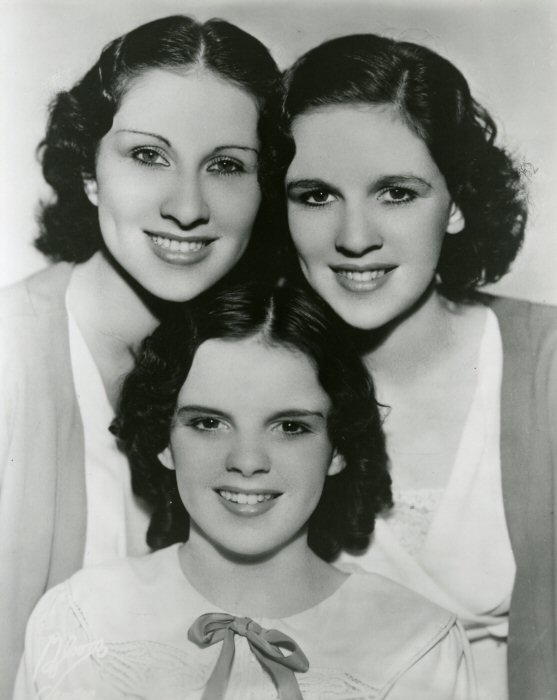
- The Gumm Sisters, also known as the Garland Sisters, c. 1935: Top row: Mary Jane and Dorothy Virginia Gumm; bottom: Judy Garland

Background information
- Origin: Lancaster, California, U.S.
- Genre: Vaudeville
- Years active: 1924–1935
- Members: Judy Garland; Dorothy Virginia Gumm; Mary Jane Gumm

The Gumm Sisters, later also known as The Garland Sisters, were an American vaudeville group composed of three sisters whose surname was Gumm, Dorothy Virginia (1917–1977), Mary Jane (1915–1964) and Frances Ethel (1922-1969). Active from 1924 to 1935, they gained recognition for their vocal harmonies, energetic performances, and appearances in short films. In 1935, Frances changed her name to Judy Garland. The group's early career, shaped by their parents’ involvement in vaudeville, helped lay the foundation for Garland’s later success.

== Career ==
=== Early years (1924–1929) ===
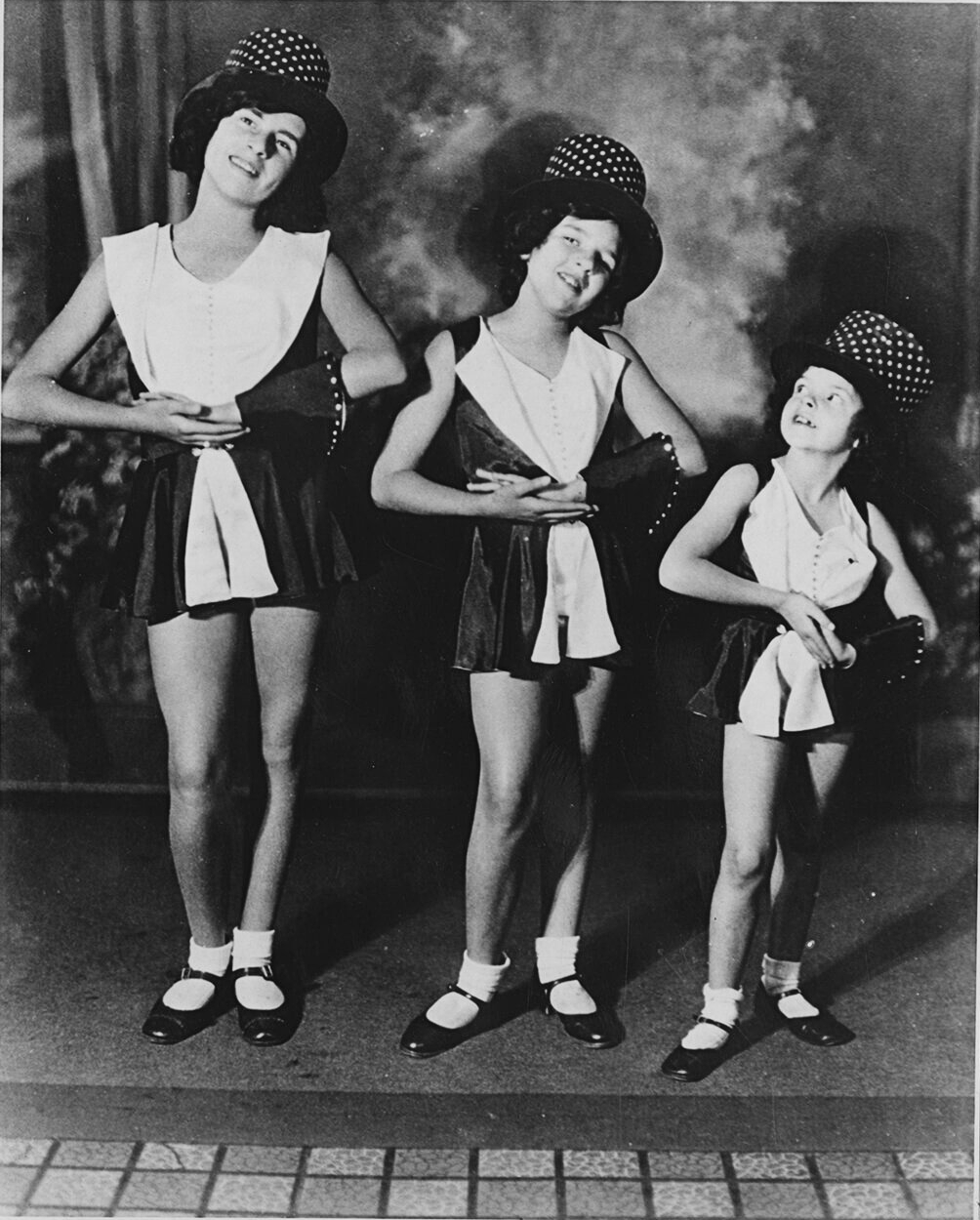
The Gumm Sisters in 1929

The Gumm Sisters' parents, Francis Avent Gumm and Ethel Marion Milne, were vaudeville performers who ran the New Grand Theater in Grand Rapids, Minnesota. From a young age, the sisters were immersed in music and stage performances, often appearing between shows that were held at their father’s theater. Garland's two older sisters, Dorothy Virginia and Mary Jane Gumm, were already singing together during these intermissions. Frances, nicknamed "Baby Gumm" at the time, made her first public singing appearance at a Christmas holiday show, demonstrating an early talent that captivated audiences.

By the mid-1920s, the family moved to Lancaster, California, where Ethel Gumm took an active role in managing her daughters' careers. The Gumm Sisters began performing in local venues, winning praise for their harmonized renditions of popular songs. Their mother, determined to push them toward greater success, secured bookings in regional vaudeville circuits. The sisters performed a mix of vocal numbers, dance routines, and comedy, reflecting the multi-talented nature of vaudeville acts at the time.

=== Rise to recognition (1929–1934) ===
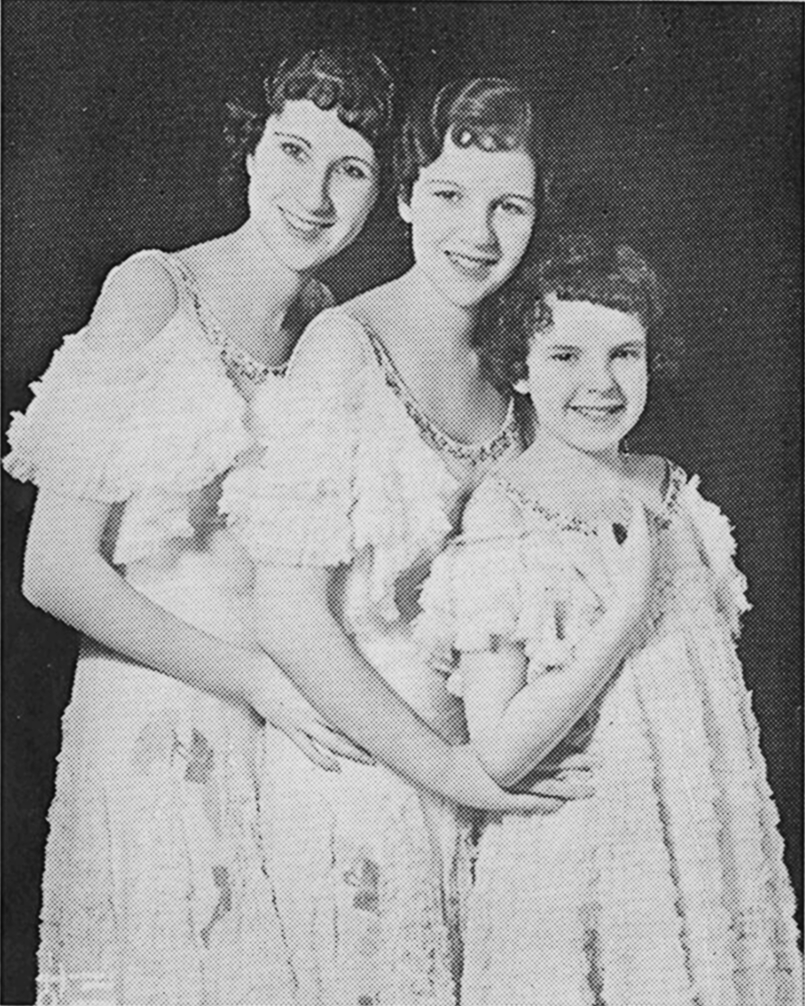
The Gumm Sisters in 1933

In 1929, the Gumm Sisters made their film debut in The Big Revue, a short film showcasing various musical acts. They followed with appearances in several other shorts, including A Holiday in Storyland (1929), The Wedding of Jack and Jill (1930), and Bubbles (1930). These performances, though relatively minor, helped increase their visibility. Around this time, the sisters also started appearing on radio programs, further broadening their audience.

Despite their growing recognition, the Gumm Sisters struggled with a name that was often mispronounced or mocked. Accounts from Judy Garland: The Secret Life of an American Legend suggest that audiences sometimes misread "Gumm" as "Glum," leading to confusion and occasional ridicule. This issue, along with a desire for a more glamorous stage name, contributed to their eventual rebranding.

=== Rebranding as The Garland Sisters (1934–1935) ===
In 1934, George Jessel reportedly suggested they change their name to "The Garland Sisters," believing it sounded more appealing and marketable. Around the same time, Frances Gumm adopted the name "Judy Garland," a decision that would soon set her apart from the trio.

The group continued to gain traction, performing at major venues, including the Chicago World’s Fair. They also secured a role in the 1935 Technicolor short film La Fiesta de Santa Barbara, marking their highest-profile film appearance. However, by this time, it was evident that Garland’s vocal talent was overshadowing the group. Ethel Gumm increasingly focused on promoting Garland as a solo performer, securing an audition for her at Metro-Goldwyn-Mayer. Her performance of "Zing! Went the Strings of My Heart" impressed MGM executives, leading to her signing with the studio in 1935.

== Disbandment and legacy ==
Following Garland’s signing with MGM, the group effectively disbanded. Dorothy and Mary Jane Gumm continued performing for a short time before retiring from show business. While the Gumm Sisters were never major stars in their own right, their contributions to vaudeville and early cinema remain a significant part of Garland’s early history.

The transition from Garland being in a family act to a solo career reflected the shifting nature of the entertainment industry at the time, as vaudeville gave way to radio and film stardom. Though Garland’s career ultimately eclipsed the group's legacy, the Gumm Sisters played a vital role in her development as an entertainer.

== Filmography ==
Title	Year	Role	Studio	Type	References
The Big Revue	1929	Themselves (as The Gumm Sisters)	Mayfair Pictures	Short film	
A Holiday in Storyland	1929	Themselves (as The Gumm Sisters)	First National Pictures	Short film	
The Wedding of Jack and Jill	1930	Themselves (as The Gumm Sisters)	First National Pictures	Short film	
Bubbles	1930	Themselves (as The Gumm Sisters)	First National Pictures	Short film	
La Fiesta de Santa Barbara	1935	Themselves (as The Garland Sisters)	Metro-Goldwyn-Mayer	Short film	
