= Roast Beef and Movies =

Roast-Beef and Movies
- Directed by: Samuel Baerwitz
- Written by: Richy Craig, Jr.
- Produced by: Samuel Baerwitz
- Starring: George Givot; Jerry Howard; Bobby Callahan; Frank O'Connor; Albertina Rasch
- Music by: Dimitri Tiomkin
- Distributed by: Metro-Goldwyn-Mayer
- Release date: February 10, 1934
- Running time: 16:16
- Country: United States
- Language: English

Roast-Beef and Movies is a short subject starring George Givot, Curly Howard (billed as "Jerry Howard"), Bobby Callahan, and the Albertina Rasch Dancers, released by Metro-Goldwyn-Mayer (MGM) on February 10, 1934. The music is by Dimitri Tiomkin, who was married to Rasch at the time.

== Plot ==
Three good-for-nothings overhear a movie producer and his partners offering a grand sum if someone will present him with a sure-fire movie idea. The leader of three dopes, Gus Parkyakarkus, barges into the meeting with his cohorts and proceeds to rattle off spiels for several inane prospective movies. The three are delighted to be told they have made a sale, but the producers turn out to be inmates from an insane asylum.

== Cast ==
- George Givot — Gus Parkyurkarkus
- Jerry Howard — Secretary stooge
- Bobby Callahan — Vice President stooge
- Frank O'Connor — MPC President
- Si Jenks — MPC Producer
- Warren Hymer — Man at gunpoint
- Ed Brady — Gunman
- Dorothy Granger — Easter Wester
- Jack Cheatham — 1st attendant
- Lee Phelps — 2nd attendant
- James Burrows — "Blue Daughter From Heaven" vocalist
- The Albertina Rasch Girls

== Production notes ==
Roast-Beef and Movies was an attempt by MGM (never known for producing skilled comedies) to create its own Three Stooge-themed comedy, with Givot as the Moe Howard-like leader, and Curly Howard – an actual Stooge – in the role normally played by middleman Larry Fine. Third wheel Bobby Callahan portrayed the "dumb-but-likable" character that Howard normally played. The film is the only known solo appearance of Curly Howard, appearing without fellow Stooges Moe and Larry or then-superior Ted Healy.

Roast-Beef and Movies was one of three MGM Stooge-related shorts filmed using the two-color Technicolor process, originally billed as Colortone Musical Revues. This process was also used in the 1933 films Nertsery Rhymes and Hello Pop!, both starring Ted Healy and His Stooges (Howard, Fine and Howard) and Bonnie Bonnell. The use of color was predicated on the decision to build plot devices in Roast-Beef and Movies around the following discarded Technicolor musical numbers from earlier 1930 MGM films:

- "Blue Daughter from Heaven" (Chinese ballet) from Lord Byron of Broadway;
- "Dust" from Children of Pleasure.

== Home media ==
Warner Archive released Roast-Beef and Movies on September 24, 2014 on DVD in region 1 as part of the Classic Shorts from The Dream Factory Series, Volume 3 (featuring Howard, Fine and Howard). The DVD includes the 5 Ted Healy and His Stooges shorts made for MGM: Plane Nuts (1933), Hello Pop! (1933), Beer and Pretzels (1933), Nertsery Rhymes (1933), and The Big Idea (1934).

== See also ==
- Three Stooges Filmography
