= Hello Pop! =

1933 American short film by Jack Cummings

Hello Pop
- Theatrical release poster
- Directed by: Jack Cummings
- Written by: Ted Healy; Matty Brooks; Moe Howard
- Starring: Ted Healy; Bonnie Bonnell; Moe Howard; Larry Fine; Curly Howard; Albertina Rasch Dancers; Henry Armetta; Edward Brophy; Tiny Sandford; Rosetta Duncan; Vivian Duncan
- Music by: Irving Berlin (song: "I’m Sailing on a Sunbeam"); Ballard MacDonald; Dimitri Tiomkin; Al Goodhart; Dave Dreyer
- Color process: Two-color Technicolor
- Distributed by: Metro-Goldwyn-Mayer
- Release date: September 16, 1933
- Running time: 16:23
- Country: United States
- Language: English

Hello Pop (the on-screen title does not have an exclamation point) was released by Metro-Goldwyn-Mayer on September 16, 1933, and is the third of five short films starring Ted Healy and His Stooges . The others are Nertsery Rhymes (1933), Plane Nuts (1933), Beer and Pretzels (1933), and The Big Idea (1934). A musical-comedy film, Hello Pop! features the Albertina Rasch Dancers and Bonnie Bonnell (Healy's girlfriend at the time).

The film was considered lost until a 35mm nitrate print was discovered in Australia in January 2013. Stooges Moe Howard, Larry Fine and Curly Howard were billed as "Howard, Fine and Howard."

== Plot ==
Papa is a theater producer who is trying to stage an elaborate musical revue. His efforts are constantly interrupted by demanding backstage personalities: a flaky Italian musician, a woman who keeps try to ask him something, Bonnie, and his raucous sons (the Stooges in children's costumes).

Papa is able to get the show ready for presentation, but during the main number, the Three Stooges slip beneath the enormous hoopskirt costume worn by the leading vocalist. They emerge on stage during the performance, ruining the show.

== Cast ==
- Ted Healy as Papa
- Moe Howard as Son
- Larry Fine as Son
- Curly Howard as Son
- Bonnie Bonnell as Bonnie
- Henry Armetta as Italian Musician
- Edward Brophy as Brophy
- Rosetta Duncan as Singer/Dancer
- Vivian Duncan as Singer/Dancer
- The Albertina Rasch Girls as Themselves
- Tiny Sandford as Strongman

== Production ==
Originally planned under the title Back Stage, Hello Pop was the third of five short films made by MGM featuring the vaudeville act billed as “Ted Healy and His Stooges.” The act focused primarily on Healy’s wit and caustic commentary, with the Stooges receiving the brunt of the physical slapstick. For the MGM short films, actress Bonnie Bonnell was incorporated into the configuration as Healy’s love interest.

Hello Pop was the second of two MGM Stooges shorts filmed in the two-color Technicolor process. (Nertsery Rhymes, the act’s first film for MGM, was also shot in color.). The use of color was predicated on the decision to build plot devices in Hello Pop! around the following discarded Technicolor musical numbers from earlier MGM films:

- "I'm Sailing on a Sunbeam" from the feature It’s a Great Life (1929);
- "Moon Ballet" from the unreleased feature The March of Time (1930)

== Preservation status ==
In the 1930s, studios were offered their two-color negatives by Technicolor, who was at that time storing them. Most studios declined the offer, the camera negatives were junked, and original release prints usually disposed of shortly after a theatrical run. A print existed in MGM's Vault #7 but was destroyed by a fire in 1965.

In January 2013, it was announced that Hello Pop had been located in an Australian private film collection and was in the process of being restored for public viewing. The film was screened at Film Forum in New York City on September 30, 2013.

== Home media ==
Warner Archive released Hello Pop on September 24, 2014, on DVD in region 1 as part of the Classic Shorts From The Dream Factory series, Volume 3 DVD set (featuring Howard, Fine and Howard). The DVD includes the other 4 Ted Healy and the Stooges shorts made for MGM, Plane Nuts (1933), Beer and Pretzels (1933), Nertsery Rhymes (1933), and The Big Idea (1934), as well as a short featuring Curly alone, Roast Beef and Movies (1934).

== See also ==
- The Three Stooges filmography
- Jail Birds of Paradise (1934)
- List of rediscovered films
