= Broadway to Hollywood (film) =

1933 film

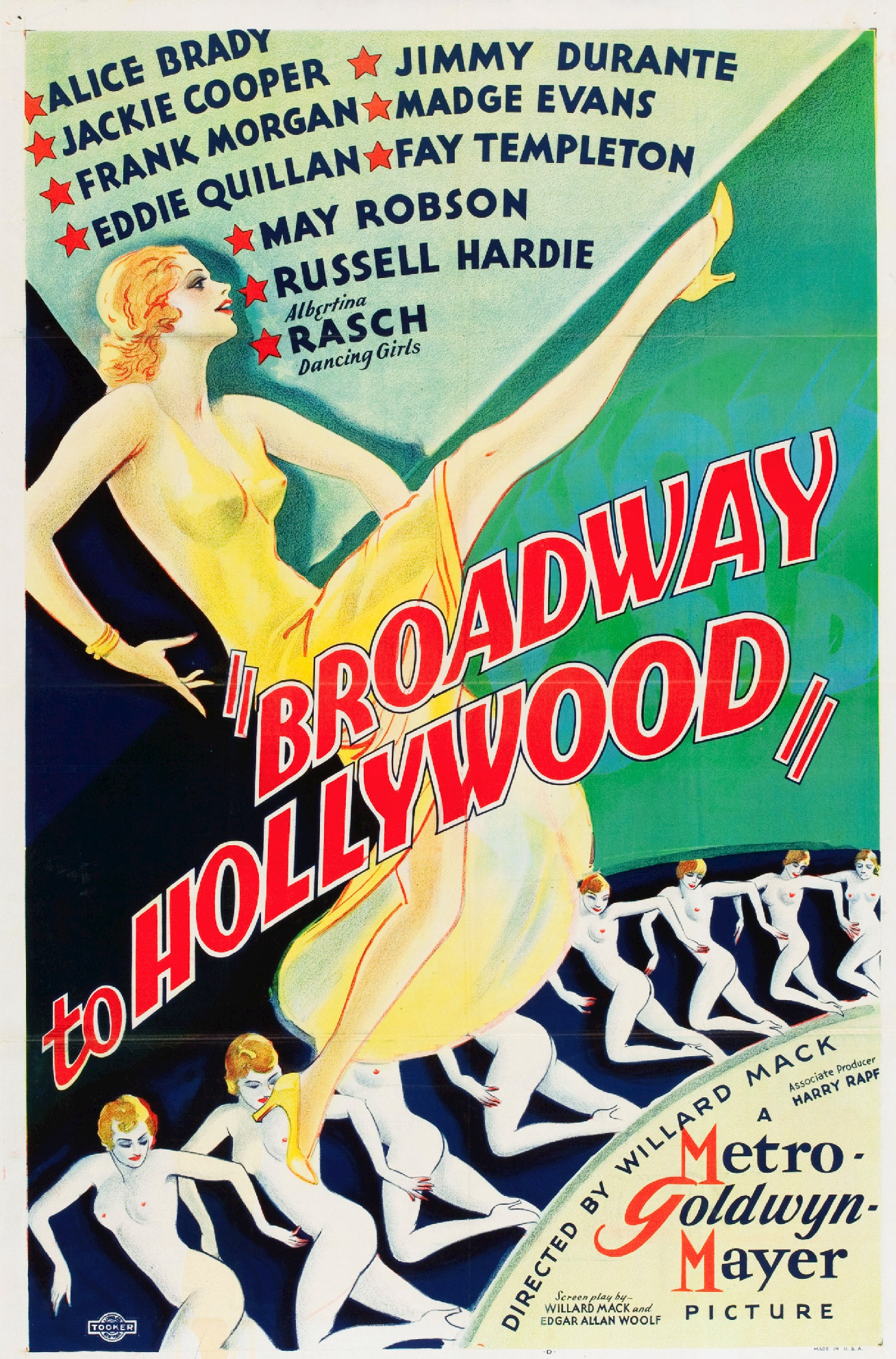
- Theatrical release poster
- Directed by: Willard Mack
- Screenplay by: Willard Mack; Edgar Allan Woolf
- Produced by: Harry Rapf
- Starring: Alice Brady; Frank Morgan; Jackie Cooper; Russell Hardie; Madge Evans; Mickey Rooney
- Cinematography: Norbert Brodine; William H. Daniels
- Edited by: William S. Gray; Ben Lewis
- Music by: William Axt
- Production company: Metro-Goldwyn-Mayer
- Distributed by: Metro-Goldwyn-Mayer
- Release date: September 15, 1933
- Running time: 85 minutes
- Country: United States
- Language: English

Broadway to Hollywood is a 1933 American pre-Code musical film directed by Willard Mack, produced by Harry Rapf, cinematography by Norbert Brodine and released by Metro-Goldwyn-Mayer. The film features many of MGM's stars of the time, including Frank Morgan, Alice Brady, May Robson, Madge Evans, Jimmy Durante, Mickey Rooney, and Jackie Cooper. Brothers Moe Howard and Curly Howard of The Three Stooges appear—without Ted Healy and without Larry Fine—almost unrecognizably, as Otto and Fritz, two clowns in makeup. It was the first film to feature Nelson Eddy.

== Plot ==
The Hackett family are vaudeville stalwarts, particularly Ted and Lulu Hackett, celebrated for their song-and-dance routines. Their son, Ted Jr., raised within the folds of the entertainment industry, rapidly outshines his parents in fame and acclaim. Upon receiving a prestigious offer for a leading role on Broadway, Ted Jr. orchestrates for his parents to join him in the production, albeit Ted Sr. is disheartened to realize their inclusion is solely to appease their son's desires. Disenchanted with their Broadway stint, the Hacketts return to vaudeville, only to confront the stark reality of their act's diminished appeal over time.

Simultaneously, Ted Jr. grapples with personal turmoil, including marriage and fatherhood, alongside struggles with alcoholism. Tragedy befalls the Hackett dynasty, casting a shadow over their future endeavors, while invoking contemplation on the cyclical nature of familial legacy and the potential repetition of past mistakes by subsequent generations.

== Cast ==
- Alice Brady as Lulu Hackett
- Frank Morgan as Ted Hackett
- Jackie Cooper as Ted Hackett Jr. as a Child
- Russell Hardie as Ted Hackett Jr.
- Madge Evans as Anne Ainsley
- Mickey Rooney as Ted Hackett III as a Child
- Eddie Quillan as Ted Hackett III
- Jimmy Durante as Jimmy
- May Robson as Veteran Actress
- Albertina Rasch Dancers as Themselves
- Fay Templeton as herself
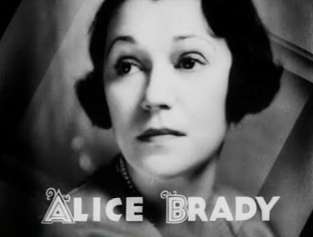
Alice Brady

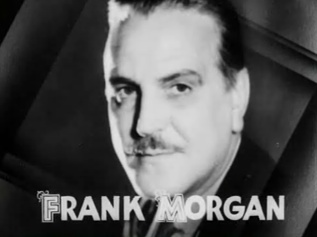
Frank Morgan

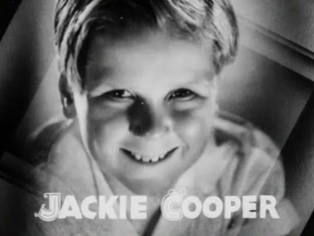
Jackie Cooper

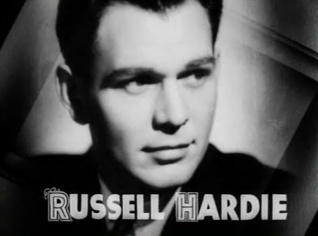
Russell Hardie

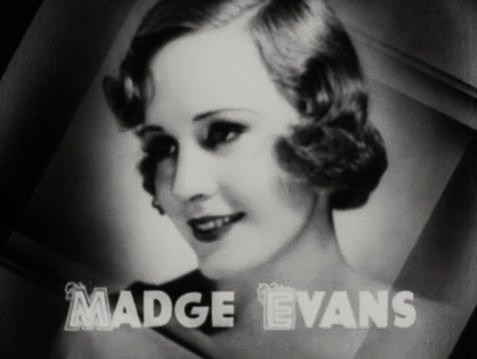
Madge Evans

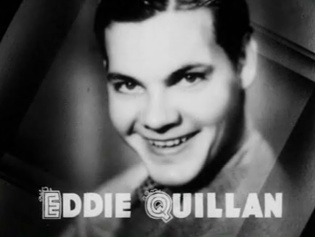
Eddie Quillan

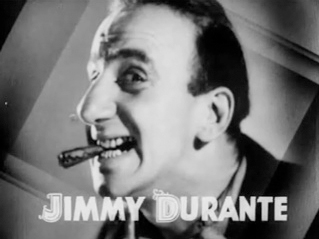
Jimmy Durante

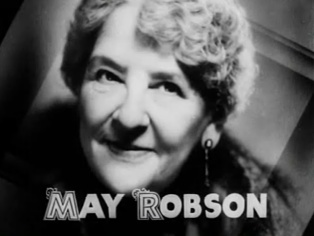
May Robson

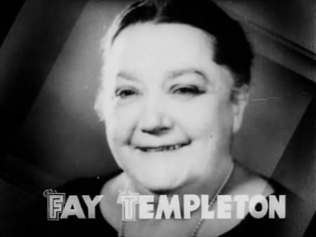
Fay Templeton

== Preservation ==
The film features several sequences taken from the unfinished MGM musical The March of Time (1930), including some filmed in the early two-color Technicolor process. Fay Templeton, DeWolf Hopper Sr., and Albertina Rasch and her dancers are featured in footage taken from The March of Time. However, current prints of Broadway to Hollywood as shown on Turner Classic Movies have no color sequences. The film was released on September 15, 1933, by Metro-Goldwyn-Mayer.

== See also ==
- Three Stooges Filmography
