= Al Boasberg =

American screenwriter

- Born: Albert Isaac Boasberg; December 5, 1891; Buffalo, New York, U.S.
- Died: June 18, 1937 (aged 45); Los Angeles, California, U.S.
- Resting place: Forest Lawn Cemetery, Buffalo, New York
- Occupations: Screenwriter, film director
- Years active: 1926-1937
- Family: James Michaels (nephew)

Albert Isaac Boasberg (December 5, 1891 – June 18, 1937) was an American comedy writer in vaudeville, radio, and film, as well as being a film director.

== Biography ==
Boasberg was born in Buffalo, New York in a Jewish family. He is credited with helping to create American stand-up comedy when he teamed with then-youthful vaudeville performer Jack Benny, helping develop Benny's familiar, reactive skinflint and thus helping make Benny a major star when he transitioned to radio in 1932. In fact, on the last day before his death, Boasberg wrote the lines that introduced the enduring Rochester character on Benny's radio show.

Similarly, Boasberg defined the enduring personalities of Bob Hope, Burns and Allen, Wheeler and Woolsey and Leon Errol. He was one of the early "script doctors", earning $1,000 a week to punch up radio scripts.

Boasberg also wrote, both credited and uncredited, for more than 60 short films and features between 1926 and 1937. Of especial note is his work on 1935's A Night at the Opera, which provided The Marx Brothers with a commercial comeback on the screen. Another Marxian, the comedy producer Sid Kuller, started out as a ghost-gag-writer for Boasberg.

Boasberg's other film writing credits included The General (starring Buster Keaton). A disagreement over screenwriting credit led to Boasberg's name being removed from the Marx Brothers’ second MGM film A Day at the Races (1937), which was his original project.

He directed the 1933 feature film Myrt and Marge which featured Ted Healy and his Three Stooges. He also directed 16 short films between 1929 and 1936, which included six Leon Errol two-reelers, four starring Walter Catlett, and Jail Birds of Paradise with Dorothy Appleby, Moe Howard and Curly Howard.

He died in Los Angeles, California, in 1937 from a heart attack. He is buried in Forest Lawn Cemetery in Buffalo, New York. Al Boasberg was the uncle of James Michaels.

In 2009, The Al Boasberg Comedy Award was established by The Buffalo International Film Festival.

== Selected filmography ==
- The General (1926)
- California or Bust (1927)
- Her Father Said No (1927)
- Quarantined Rivals (1927)
- Ladies' Night in a Turkish Bath (1928)
- Speedy (1928)
- Chasing Rainbows (1930)
- Fifty Million Frenchmen (1931)
- Cracked Nuts (1931)
- Freaks (1932)
- Jail Birds of Paradise (1934)
- A Night at the Opera (1935)
- A Day at the Races (1937)
