= Inga Andersen =

Argentine-Canadian singer and dancer (1909–1959)

- Andersen in 1939
- Born: March 10, 1909; Buenos Aires, Argentina
- Died: September 28, 1959 (aged 50); Prince George, British Columbia, Canada
- Occupations: Actress, dancer, and singer
- Known for: Entertainer to British troops at the front lines during World War II

Inga Hensina Andersen (March 10, 1909 – September 28, 1959) was a Canadian singer and dancer, born in Argentina of Danish heritage. She began learning to dance as a young girl and became a dance teacher in her teens. By 1940, she performed on the radio, television, and stage. She was a cabaret singer, who also wrote the lyrics for songs that she sang. She sang, danced, acted, and played the violin.

Early in her career, she trained and performed in Hollywood, Los Angeles. In New York, she entertained on Broadway. She performed with the Ziegfeld Follies and as one of the "Seven Albertina Dancers".

Andersen acted, sang, and choreographed dance in England, like Wild Violets at Drury Lane. She performed in Jack and Jill, Jack O'Diamonds, and The Women.

She remained in Europe during World War II, performing at the front lines, at bombed out buildings, and during black outs. She became known as "The Blackout Girl". Andersen was the first person to entertain the troops, starting just ten days into the war, and she continued for a total of six years, performing for two years after the war. She reportedly made the top ten of Hitler's black list for the propaganda songs she sang about him, like "Hail Adolph".

== Early life and training ==
Inga Hensina Andersen was born on March 10, 1909 in Buenos Aires, Argentina, to Metha Andersen (Note: Her middle name is also spelled Hansine. A newspaper article incorrectly states that she was born near Prince George in Canada.) and A.P. Andersen, both of whom were born in Denmark. She moved with her parents to Canada in 1912. Her father, a lumberman, builder, and lumberyard owner, moved the business and family to Prince George. Her brother Henning performed as a musician in Europe.

Andersen grew up in Prince George. She first learned to dance by her mother when she was a little girl. Then she followed a correspondence course to dance and become a star "in 15 easy lessons" and books. She refined her technique and skills by taking courses every summer in locales such as Detroit, New York, Pittsburgh, and Seattle. After studying at the Barbes School of Dance in Vancouver, she returned to Prince George and began teaching young girls at age 16. Andersen and her students were in a number of recitals in 1928 and 1929, including the Yambo dance. She also taught fur trappers to dance. With the money that she earned teaching, she went to Hollywood.

== Career ==
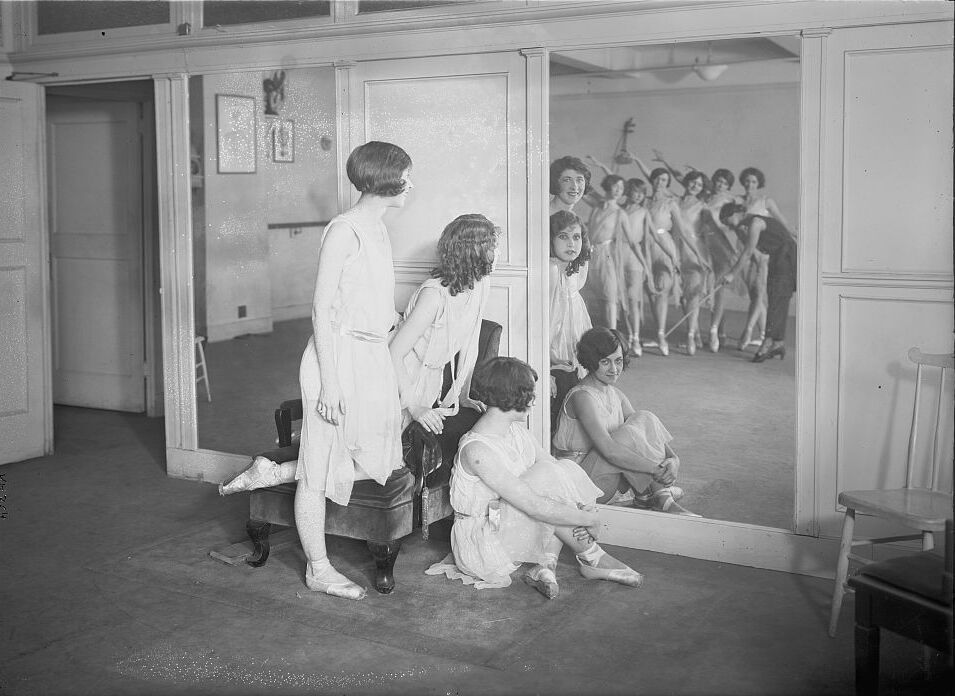
Ballet dancers trained by choreographer and dancer Albertina Rasch (1891-1967), reflected in a mirror.

In Los Angeles, she studied dance at Albertina Rasch's studio in 1929 and was hired as an instructor in the summer of 1930 at the Ernest E. Ryder School of Dancing. She went on to tour with the Rasch troupe throughout the U.S., ending in New Orleans. From there, she got work in New York in The Girl of the Golden West and Ballyhoo, performed with the Ziegfeld Follies, and Rasch asked Andersen to come to England to help with Wild Violets. It opened in Drury Lane in October 1932 and then toured the United Kingdom and South Africa. Andersen toured the United States as one of the famous "Seven Albertina Dancers."

In England, she performed in a starring role and choreographed most of the dances in Jack and Jill in 1934. She also had a starring role in Jack O'Diamonds in 1935. By the late 1930s, Andersen had acted in some films and was a regular on the BBC and the cabaret circuit in London. She was billed as "Canada's Sophisticated Songstress." On a visit home to Prince George in the summer of 1937, Andersen was feted at a Board of Trade appreciation banquet, hailed as "a great inspiration to the children of the city...."

Andersen and Fred Stone toured with Smiley Faces. She played for the Prince George, Duke of Kent and Princess Marina, Duchess of Kent and the William Coxen, Lord Mayor of London and Kathleen Coxen Lady Mayoress of London in 1939. The same year, she sang and acted in The Women. Andersen also performed in Paris, France.

At the beginning of World War II, she became popular for singing "We're Going to Hang out the Washing on the Siegfried Line". During World War II, she would not leave Europe for engagements in New York. Andersen entertained with cabaret shows at Cafe de Paris, where it was said that she "sang songs that were topical, witty and a bit naughty" at elegant places. She performed at The Churchill Club and Bagatelle in Mayfair, London. In London, she also starred in Fig Leaves (February 1940), Cole Porter's Du Barry Was a Lady (1942), and Flying Colours (1943).

== World War II ==
External image
- Andersen with the Irish Brigade

Ten days into World War II, Andersen began to perform for the British troops, the first entertainer to do so. She went to the front lines during World War II to entertain the soldiers. She acquired the name "The Blackout Girl" because she was rare among entertainers to perform during black-out conditions and alongside bombed out buildings. Andersen sang and acted for troops in Cairo.

She became lost and went behind German enemy lines to play to 80,000 soldiers during the Battle of Monte Cassino in Italy. Among the soldiers that she performed for were Americans, one of who asked, "What in the name of blankety-blank are you doing here!?" She sang propaganda songs, like "Hail Adolph" and "Hitler's Secret Weapon", that reportedly earned her a place in the top ten of Hitler's black list, or execution list. Her days were often 18 hours long, without soap and without enough water for drinking let alone washing. Without dressing rooms, she sometimes used a tank or the backs of five soldiers to hide behind when she changed her clothes. She continued to entertain the troops two years after the end of the war.

== Later career and death ==
After the war, she sang in New York at the Illustrator's Club, La Rue Restaurant and Le Vouvray. She was interviewed for Sarah Churchill's television show. She met Sarah's famous father during that war and noted that he "smokes as much as my Dad."

While in New York, she modeled and taught Latin American dancing in the Fred Astaire Studios. She entertained at Montreal's Mount Royal Hotel and Ruby Foo's. She was a guest performer for the International College of Surgeons' Convention in Buenos Aires, her birth city, where she met Eva Peron.

Andersen returned to Prince George in the late 1950s and died on September 28, 1959, aged 50. She was survived by her brother Henning, who lived in Vancouver, and her father, still living in Prince George. Her mother died August 1, 1941. Andersen is buried next to her parents, both whom are now deceased, in a cemetery at Prince George.
