= Bonnie Bonnell =

American entertainer (1905–1964)

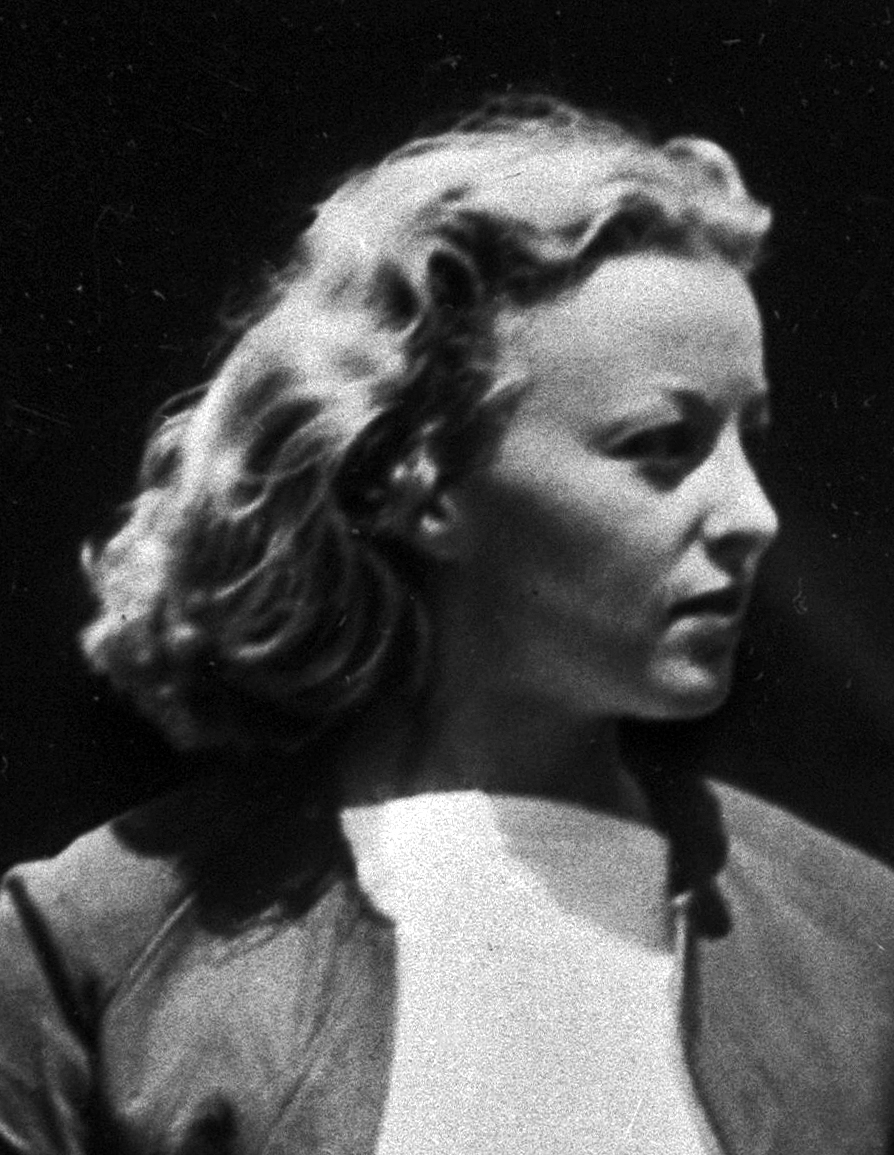
- Bonnell in 1941
- Born: Marion Wright Bonnell; August 1, 1905; Thomasville, Georgia, U.S.
- Died: March 14, 1964 (aged 58); Santa Monica, California, U.S.
- Other names: Bonny
- Occupation(s): Film actress singer
- Years active: 1933–1934

Bonnie Bonnell (August 1, 1905 – March 14, 1964) was an actress who played "straight woman" in seven early short comedies, most of which featured the Three Stooges when they worked with Ted Healy, between 1933 and 1934.

== Career ==
According to Stooges biographers, she was also Healy's offscreen girlfriend during that time. In the film Plane Nuts, she plays a "fourth stooge", working as a partner to Moe, Larry, and Curly as they torment Healy during his stage act. She was a stage and vaudeville actress for several years before her film career.

Bonnell died of liver failure on March 14, 1964, at age 58 in Santa Monica, California.

== Filmography ==
- Nertsery Rhymes (1933) as The Fairy Godmother (billed as "Bonny")
- Beer and Pretzels (1933) as Bonny
- Hello Pop! (1933) as Bonny
- Plane Nuts (1933) as Bonnie
- Myrt and Marge (1933) as gate crasher
- The Big Idea (1934) as cleaning lady
- Hollywood on Parade (1934) as woman in bar
