= Beer and Pretzels =

1933 American short film by Jack Cummings

- Directed by: Jack Cummings
- Written by: Ted Healy; Matty Brooks; Moe Howard
- Starring: Ted Healy; Bonnie Bonnell; Moe Howard; Larry Fine; Curly Howard; Edward Brophy; Jack Norton; Smilin Jack Smith; Martin Sperzel; Al Teeter
- Music by: Al Goodhart; Gus Kahn
- Distributed by: Metro-Goldwyn-Mayer
- Release date: August 26, 1933 (U.S.)
- Running time: 20:23
- Country: United States
- Language: English

Beer and Pretzels was released by Metro-Goldwyn-Mayer on August 26, 1933, and is the second of five short films starring Ted Healy and His Stooges (Moe Howard, Larry Fine and Curly Howard). The others are Nertsery Rhymes (1933), Plane Nuts (1933), Hello Pop! (1933), and The Big Idea (1934). A musical-comedy film, Beer and Pretzels features Bonnie Bonnell, Healy's girlfriend at the time.

Some footage of Healy and the Stooges from the unfinished MGM musical The March of Time was included in the film as well.

== Plot ==
Ted Healy and his Stooges are entertainers. But because Healy is much more interested in women than he is in performing, they are thrown out of the Happy Hour Theatre. Unable to keep a job anywhere else, they are reduced to waiting tables at a high-class restaurant. This, of course, ends up being a disaster as the restaurant is thrown into chaos because of them. So, yet again, they are thrown back out on to the streets.

== Cast ==
=== Credited ===
- Ted Healy as himself
- Moe Howard as Moe
- Larry Fine as Larry
- Curly Howard as Curly
- Bonnie Bonnell as Bonny Latour

=== Uncredited ===
- Edward Brophy as Theater Manager
- Fred Malatesta as Restaurant Manager
- Jack Smith as Singing Bartender
- Martin Sperzel as Singing Bartender
- Al Teeter as Singing Bartender

== Home Video Releases ==
Beer and Pretzels was released on DVD September 14, 2014 as part of the Warner Archive Collection Classic Shorts from the Dream Factory, Volume 3, which includes all 5 Ted Healy and His Stooges MGM shorts as well as the 2-color 1934 MGM short Roast-Beef and Movies featuring Jerome "Curly" Howard.

== See also ==
- The Three Stooges filmography
