= Ethelind Terry =

American actress

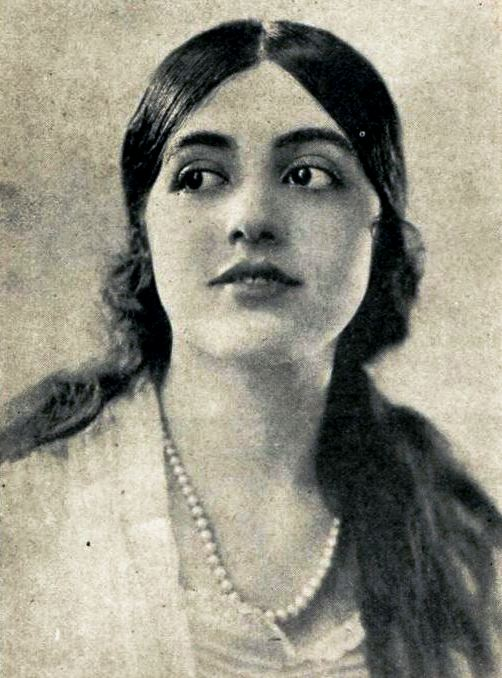
- Born: August 14, 1899; Philadelphia, Pennsylvania, United States
- Died: March 17, 1984 (aged 84); Fort Lauderdale, Florida, United States
- Occupation: actress
- Years active: 1920–1937
- Spouses: Benedict Bogeaus (m. 1928; div. 1931) Dick Purcell (m. 1942; div. 1942)

Ethelind Terry (14 August 1899 – 17 March 1984) was an American stage and film actress.

== Career ==
Terry starred in one of the most famous Broadway shows of the 1920s, the musical Rio Rita produced by Florenz Ziegfeld. She also starred in the film Lord Byron of Broadway.

== Marriages ==
Terry married Benedict Bogeaus in 1928. They divorced in 1931. Terry eloped to Las Vegas with the actor Dick Purcell. The two married on March 3, 1942, only to divorce on August 26, 1942.

== Theatrical appearances ==
- Honeydew (Broadway, premiered September 6, 1920)
- Kid Boots (Broadway, premiered December 31, 1923)
- Rio Rita (Broadway, premiered February 2, 1927)
- Nina Rosa (Broadway, premiered September 20, 1930)

== Filmography ==
- Music Box Revue (1923), Pathé film of C. B. Cochran's London production including Terry performing with Renie Riano
- Lord Byron of Broadway (1930)
- Nertsery Rhymes (1933), The Woman in the Shoe Scene from Lord Byron of Broadway
- Arizona Days (1937)
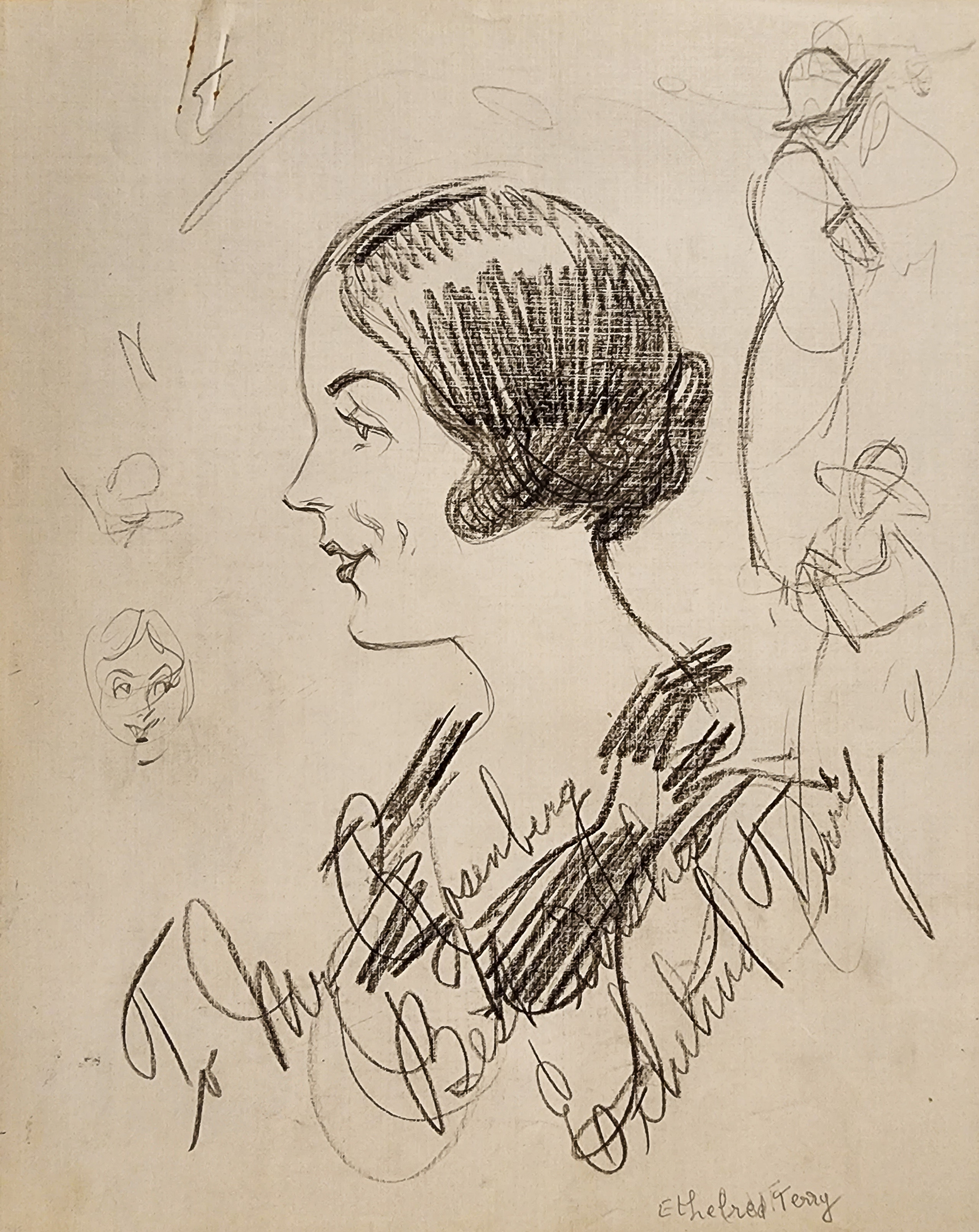
  Signed drawing by Manuel Rosenberg 1924
