= George Givot =

American actor (1903–1984)

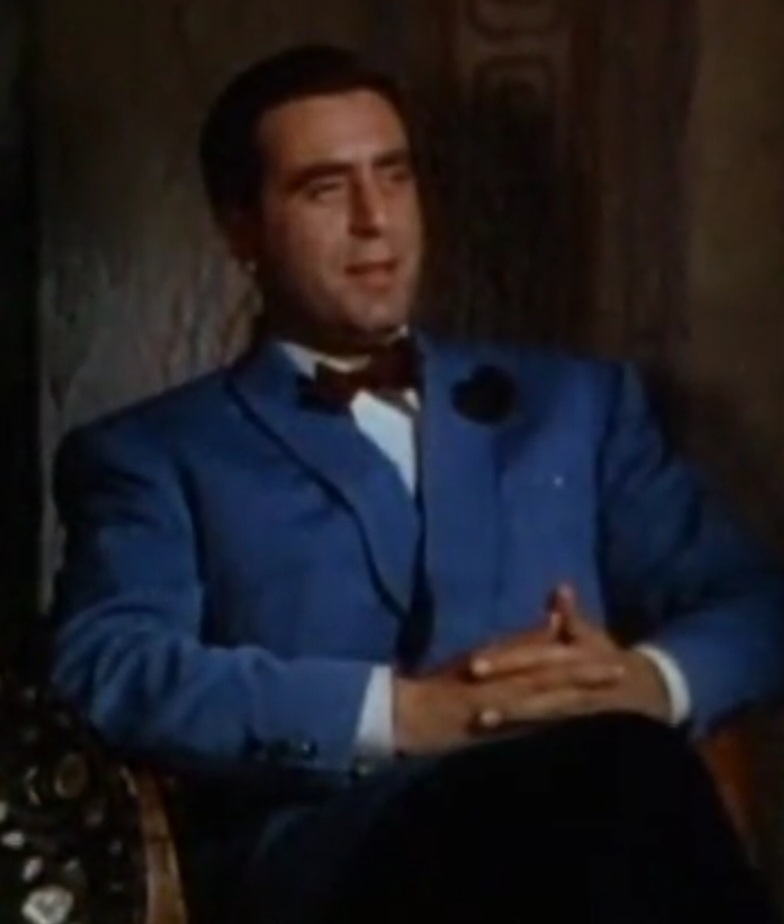
- Givot in Fiesta (1941)
- Born: George David Givot; February 18, 1903; Ekaterinoslav, Russian Empire (now Dnipro, Ukraine)
- Died: June 7, 1984 (aged 81); Palm Springs, California, U.S.
- Occupations: Comedian, actor
- Years active: 1933–1961
- Spouses: Maryon Curtis (m. 1937; div. 1941) Dorothy Durkee (m. 1945)

George David Givot (February 18, 1903 – June 7, 1984) was a Russian-born American comedian and actor on Broadway and in vaudeville, movies, television and radio. He was known for speaking in a comedic fake Greek dialect and was styled the "Greek Ambassador of Good Will". His best known movie role may be as the voice of Tony in the Disney animated film Lady and the Tramp (1955), where he serenaded the titular characters with the romantic ballad "Bella Notte."

== Early life ==
Givot said that he did not know who his parents are; he was adopted by a French family when he was three. According to official documents, he was born on 18 February 1903 in Ekaterinoslav (now Dnipro, Ukraine), Russian Empire, to Walf Givistinsky - later William Wolf Givot(1875–1955) and Sofya—later Sarah—Givistinsky (née Garber) (1875–1930).

According to the 1910 census, the family emigrated to the US in 1906 and settled in Omaha, Nebraska. They later moved to Chicago, where Givot went to high school and college. His night school journalism instructor became fed up with the class clown and sent him to see the man in charge of the midnight to 3 am broadcasts at a radio station, who hired him. Paul Ash heard Givot perform and gave him his start in vaudeville.

== Dialect comedian ==
Givot was one of the earliest, perhaps the earliest, of the Greek dialect comedians, working in vaudeville, nightclubs, film and radio from the 1920s on. He had learned some Greek working in a Greek candy store in Omaha as a soda jerk. In 1949, Billboard magazine reviewer Bill Smith panned his performance in one East Side venue ("saw him take the prize for dullness"), but praised him for the same routines in "Billy Rose's mauve decade nitery":

Givot's act is made up of tolerable singing and corn. The latter, dressed up with his Greek dialect, takes on a certain kind of freshness. That, plus Givot's appearance and salesmanship, won him yocks upon yocks. ... Givot is a natural with his Greek malaprops and situation gags.

In 1926, 16-year-old student Helen Britt was taken into custody for trying to blackmail the vaudeville entertainer, but was released when police were satisfied she was just joking.

== Broadway ==
When Mae West wrote the play The Constant Sinner, she wanted to cast African American Lorenzo Tucker as her character's black lover. This would have been extremely controversial in the segregation-era United States of the 1930s, so she reluctantly agreed to have Givot perform in blackface instead. The producers insisted that Givot remove his wig at the end of every performance to show the audience he was white. The Constant Sinner ran on Broadway for 64 performances from September to November 1931.

George and Ira Gershwin were hired to showcase English music hall star Jack Buchanan in Pardon My English. When Buchanan was unable to convincingly play half of his double role (the lower-class German thug Golo Schmidt), he was replaced by Givot. Givot and Josephine Huston introduced the Gershwin song "Isn't It a Pity?" in the 1933 Broadway musical. Pardon My English was a flop and soon closed.

He had much better success as one of the stars of the 1944 Cole Porter musical Mexican Hayride. Here he met his future second wife, co-star Dorothy Durkee. Al Hirschfeld drew a caricature of Givot and others in the cast.

== Film ==
Givot appeared in a number of Big V Comedies, comedy shorts produced by Warner Bros. and Vitaphone in the 1930s. With the 1934 Technicolor short Roast-Beef and Movies, MGM tried to create its own version of the Three Stooges, with Givot as the Greek Moe Howard-like leader, and Curly Howard—an actual Stooge—in the role normally played by Larry Fine.

Givot played supporting roles not only in comedies and musicals, but also in dramas, from his debut in The Chief (1933) to the war movie China Gate (1957). Givot did star once, in the 1942 musical Flying with Music. As the voice of Tony in the animated Disney film Lady and the Tramp (1955), he introduced the Sonny Burke-Peggy Lee song "Bella Notte".

== Television ==
Givot was the original host of the Bonnie Maid Versa-Tile Varieties television series, which began airing in 1949 at 9 pm on Fridays on NBC. The September 10, 1949, Billboard issue gave him a moderately good review:

The veteran comic handled his emcee chores with the ease of vast experience and moved the standard vaude format along at a bright, brisk pace. His jokes and "Greek ambassador" routine were pretty stale, but his warm, show-wise personality televised well, and he undoubtedly helped imbue the show's talented but largely untried acts with a professional air.

Nonetheless, he was replaced after two months.

He also appeared on The Ed Sullivan Show twice in 1958, on May 11 and July 27.

== Radio ==
Givot had his own radio show at different times. He was one of the panelists on Stop Me If You've Heard This One when it was revived in 1947. The April 20, 1946, issue of Billboard referred to him as a "one-time radio biggie".

== Personal life ==
He married actress Maryon Curtis in 1937. According to his advance man, Givot planned to retire and become a "gentleman farmer ... on his estate in Tarzana, Calif.", but marital problems drained his finances, forcing him to continue working. The couple divorced in 1941. On December 1, 1945, he married Dorothy Durkee. The two had become acquainted when they both starred in the musical Mexican Hayride; in fact, Durkee's character had chased Givot's.

According to newspaper gossip columnist Hedda Hopper, notorious gangster Bugsy Siegel was a friend of Givot's and once inadvertently saved his life. Siegel persuaded the comedian to stay an extra day in Chicago; the plane he was going to take crashed, with the loss of 17 lives.

== Death ==
George Givot died of a heart attack on June 7, 1984, in Palm Springs, California. He was interred in California.

== Broadway credits ==
- Earl Carroll's Sketch Book (1929–1930)
- The Constant Sinner (1931)
- Americana (1932 revival)
- Pardon My English (1933)
- Mexican Hayride (1944–1945)
- Do Re Mi (1960–1962)

== Complete filmography ==
- Nothing Ever Happens (1933 short) - Chef (uncredited)
- Gobs of Fun (1933 short) - Greek sailor
- The Chief (1933) - Greek clothing merchant
- Howd' Ya Like That? (1934 short) - Greek sailor
- Roast Beef and Movies (1934 short) - Gus Parkyurkarkus
- Ed Sullivan's Headliners (1934 short) - Greek restaurant owner
- Hollywood Party (1934) - Liondora, aka Grand Royal Duke
- Riffraff (1936) - Markis
- Paddy O'Day (1936) - Mischa Petrovitch
- The White Hope (1936 short) - George
- Thin Ice (1937) - Alex
- Step Lively, Jeeves! (1937) - Prince Boris Caminov
- The Hit Parade (1937) - Herman
- Wake Up and Live (1937) - Manager
- Conquest (1937) - Constant (uncredited)
- 45 Fathers (1937) - Prof. Bellini
- Beg, Borrow or Steal (1937) - Izmanov
- Hollywood Cavalcade (1939) - Englishman
- Young as You Feel (1940) - Boris Mousilvitch
- Fiesta (1941) - Fernando Gómez
- Flying with Music (1942) - Harry Bernard
- Road to Morocco (1942) - Neb Jolla
- Two Saplings (1943 short)
- The Leather Burners (1943) - Sam Bucktoe
- Du Barry Was a Lady (1943) - Cheezy / Count de Roquefort
- Behind the Rising Sun (1943) - Boris
- Government Girl (1943) - Count Bodinsky (uncredited)
- The Falcon and the Co-eds (1943) - Dr. Anatole Graelich
- Riffraff (1947) - Rues
- Captain Pirate (1952) - Tomas Velasquez
- April in Paris (1952) - François
- Lost in a Turkish Bath (1953 short) - Bertram Fairweather
- Three Sailors and a Girl (1953) - Emilio Rossi
- The Racers (1955) - Baron (uncredited)
- Lady and the Tramp (1955) - Tony (voice)
- Ain't Misbehavin' (1955) - Greek boatman
- The Benny Goodman Story (1956) - Jake Primo
- Miracle in the Rain (1956) - Headwaiter
- The Girl Can't Help It (1956) - Lucas (uncredited)
- China Gate (1957) - Cpl. Pigalle

== See also ==
- Parkyakarkus, another Greek dialect comedian
