= Nell Martin =

American novelist

Nell Columbia Boyer Martin (1890–1961), usually known as Nell Martin and also published under the name Columbia Boyer, was an American author from Illinois specializing in light-hearted mysteries and short stories.

== Biography ==
Her full name was Nell Columbia Boyer Martin. Having worked as a strawberry picker, newspaper reporter, taxi-cab driver, lawyer's assistant, laundry worker, singer, actress and press agent before becoming a writer, she referred to herself as a "Jill of all trades."

In her career as a writer, she also published under the name Columbia Boyer as well as her full name Nell Columbia Boyer Martin.

Her "Maisie" short stories were published in Top Notch Magazine in 1927–1928, and Dashiell Hammett suggested that they may have later inspired the movie and radio series starring Ann Sothern as the character Maisie Ravier. However, it is recorded elsewhere that the concept for the original Maisie film came from the novel Dark Dame by Wilson Collison, and Collison is credited as original writer or creator of the character on many of the Maisie films.

Her 1928 novel Lord Byron of Broadway was made into a movie of the same title by MGM in 1930.

She was at one time the lover of the mystery writer Dashiell Hammett and he dedicated his 1931 novel The Glass Key to her. She married Ashley Weed Dickinson, a journalist and author.

== Works ==
Martin wrote eight novels and over 200 short stories. Her novels include:

- The Constant Simp (1927), which was reportedly a parody of the novel, The Constant Nymph
- The Mosaic Earring (1927)
- Lord Byron of Broadway: A Novel (1928)
- The Other Side of the Fence: A Novel (1929)
- Lovers Should Marry (1933), which she dedicated to Hammett.
