= Jail Birds of Paradise =

- Theatrical release poster
- Directed by: Al Boasberg
- Written by: Al Boasberg
- Produced by: Jack Cummings; Samuel Baerwitz
- Starring: Dorothy Appleby; Moe Howard; Curly Howard
- Distributed by: Metro-Goldwyn-Mayer
- Release date: March 10, 1934
- Running time: 18 minutes
- Country: United States
- Language: English

Jail Birds of Paradise is a lost American 1934 Metro-Goldwyn-Mayer short starring Dorothy Appleby plus brothers Moe and Curly Howard (of Three Stooges fame).

The film was written and directed by Al Boasberg, and filmed in Technicolor. The film was released on March 10, 1934.

== Synopsis ==
When the Warden of Paradise Prison is absent for three months, his daughter Miss Deering (Dorothy Appleby) decides to turn the prison into the 'Paradise', a luxurious hotel complete with all the amenities, and she sets the prison guards to run the 'hotel' for her. As Miss Deering and her secretary tour the prison there are a series of sight gags that involve various prisoners; among them, registering at Paradise's front desk, are Joe Pantz (Moe Howard), an axe murderer who has transferred from Leavenworth.

During a show held in the Prison Auditorium that evening with dinner and music, Moe enters with Curly Howard, who is wearing a toupée, and the two work a hair tonic scheme among the other prisoners; this scene was later reworked for Moe Howard, Larry Fine and Joe DeRita in their 1961 feature, Snow White and the Three Stooges. The evening ends with gunshots and a vase-throwing melee among the prisoners.

The Dodge Twins appear in a number called "The Lock Step", which had been shot in color early in 1930 at the then brand new MGM extra high sound Stage Six for The March of Time, an MGM musical which was never finished or released. This sequence was recycled in Jail Birds of Paradise.

== Cast ==
- Dorothy Appleby as Miss Deering, Prison Warder
- Heinie Conklin as Prisoner
- Beth Dodge as Bell Hop (credited as Dodge Twins)
- Betty Dodge as Bell Hop (credited as Dodge Twins)
- Harrison Greene as Prisoner
- Curly Howard as Prisoner (credited as Jerry Howard)
- Moe Howard as Joe Pantz
- M-G-M Dancing Girls as Themselves
- Frank Moran as Convict
- Jack Pennick as "Redface", Convict
- Shirley Ross as Herself
- Leo White as Tailor
- Austin J. Young as Dancer

== Preservation status ==
This film is now considered a lost film, with no studio, collector prints or negatives known to exist. According to some sources the only known copy was destroyed in the 1965 MGM vault fire.

== See also ==
- The Three Stooges filmography
- Hello Pop! (1933)
- List of lost films
