= Mad Holiday =

1936 film by George B. Seitz

- Directed by: George B. Seitz
- Screenplay by: Florence Ryerson; Edgar Allan Woolf
- Based on: Murder in a Chinese Theatre by short storyJoseph Santley
- Produced by: Harry Rapf
- Starring: Edmund Lowe; Elissa Landi; ZaSu Pitts; Ted Healy; Edmund Gwenn; Edgar Kennedy
- Cinematography: Joseph Ruttenberg
- Edited by: George Boemler
- Music by: William Axt
- Production company: Metro-Goldwyn-Mayer
- Distributed by: Metro-Goldwyn-Mayer
- Release date: November 13, 1936
- Running time: 71 minutes
- Country: United States
- Language: English

Mad Holiday is a 1936 American comedy mystery film directed by George B. Seitz and written by Florence Ryerson and Edgar Allan Woolf. The film stars Edmund Lowe, Elissa Landi, ZaSu Pitts, Ted Healy, Edmund Gwenn and Edgar Kennedy. The film was released on November 13, 1936, by Metro-Goldwyn-Mayer.

== Plot ==
Philip Trent, the star of a series of Hollywood mystery films, is tired of their receptiveness and goes on an ocean cruise to get away from it. However, on board an apparent murder takes place, only for it to turn out to be an invention of the author of the novels on which his films are based. Things take another turn when a real body is discovered on the ship.

== Cast ==
- Edmund Lowe as Philip Trent
- Elissa Landi as Peter Dean
- ZaSu Pitts as Mrs. Faye Kinney
- Ted Healy as Mert Morgan
- Edmund Gwenn as Williams
- Edgar Kennedy as Donovan
- Soo Yong as Li Tai
- Walter Kingsford as Ben Kelvin
- Herbert Rawlinson as Captain Bromley
- Raymond Hatton as Cokey Joe Ferris
- Rafaela Ottiano as Ning
- Harlan Briggs as Mr. Bertie Kinney
- Gustav von Seyffertitz as Hendrick Van Mier
