= Soup to Nuts =

1930 film by Benjamin Stoloff

- Trade magazine ad
- Directed by: Benjamin Stoloff
- Written by: Rube Goldberg
- Produced by: A. L. Rocket
- Starring: Ted Healy; Charles Winninger; Frances McCoy; Lucile Browne; Stanley Smith; Hallam Cooley; George Bickel; William H. Tooker; Shemp Howard; Harry Howard; Larry Fine; Fred Sanborn
- Cinematography: Joseph Valentine
- Edited by: Clyde Carruth
- Music by: Cliff Friend; James Monaco
- Distributed by: Fox Film Corporation
- Release date: September 28, 1930
- Running time: 70 minutes
- Country: United States
- Language: English

Soup to Nuts is a 1930 American pre-Code comedy film written by cartoonist, sculptor, author, and inventor Rube Goldberg and directed by Benjamin Stoloff. It was the film debut of the original four members who would later, minus Ted Healy, go on to become known as The Three Stooges comic trio (Shemp Howard, Moe Howard, and Larry Fine). Goldberg made a cameo appearance in the film as himself, opening letters in a restaurant. Several other comedians are also featured.

The U.S. copyright to Soup to Nuts expired, and the film entered the public domain on January 1, 2026.

== Plot ==
Soup to Nuts (1930)

Ted Healy is a salesman for the Schmidt Costume Shop who spends his free time at the local fire station with the firemen. Old man Schmidt spends more time building crazy inventions (typical of the devices of writer/cartoonist Rube Goldberg) than tending to his business; as a consequence, he is bankrupt, and his business is taken over by his creditors, who send a young man named Carlson to manage it. Carlson immediately falls for Schmidt's niece, Louise, but she resists him.

Meanwhile, General Avocado comes to the costume shop to order uniforms for a revolution he is planning in San Stevedore, but his army flees in fright without paying when a child bursts a toy balloon. Ted also swings a deal with the Fire Department to supply costumes for the firemen's ball. Carlson wants to take Louise, so Ted hatches a plan to take Louise and have himself and Carlson dressed alike, then switch places at the ball. When Louise learns of the switch, she runs back to the shop and locks herself in her room. Carlson chases her home and unknowingly starts a fire while trying to persuade her to come out. The firemen arrive to extinguish the blaze, with the unexpected help of one of Old Man Schmidt's inventions, and Louise and Carlson finally reconcile.

== Cast ==
=== Credited ===
- Ted Healy as Ted
- Frances McCoy as Queenie
- Stanley Smith as Richard Carlson
- Lucile Browne as Louise
- Charles Winninger as Otto Schmidt
- Hallam Cooley as D. Quincy Throckmorton
- George Bickel as Gus Klein
- Shemp Howard as fireman
- Larry Fine as fireman
- Harry Howard as fireman
- William H. Tooker as Ferguson
- Fred Sanborn as mute fireman

=== Uncredited ===
- Billy Barty as Junior
- Rube Goldberg as himself (cameo)
- Heinie Conklin as fireman playing checkers
- Billy Bletcher as revolutionary
- Billy Engle as revolutionary
- Bobby Barber as revolutionary
- Jimmy Aubrey as revolutionary
- Billy Engle as revolutionary
- Robert Milasch as revolutionary
- Mack Swain as first fat diner
- Leo White as husband with cake

== The Three Stooges appearance ==
This film was released before Shemp, Moe & Larry first broke out on their own and toured as "Howard, Fine & Howard: Three Lost Soles" from Fall 1930 to mid-1932. They rejoined Healy in July 1932 for the Broadway revue Passing Show of 1932, but Healy quit during rehearsals, which subsequently prompted Shemp Howard to leave on August 19, 1932 (he remained with Passing for a time, and then began a solo career, landing at Brooklyn's Vitaphone Studios in May 1933). Younger Howard brother Jerry (Curly) replaced Shemp on August 20, 1932, and Ted Healy's stooges became Moe, Larry & Curly. The Stooges finally split from Healy in March 1934, and became The Three Stooges at Columbia Pictures. (When Curly was debilitated by strokes years later, Shemp reluctantly abandoned his solo career and returned to the Stooges). In Soup to Nuts, Shemp appears to be the "leader" of the three. He has most of the dialogue and does a lot of the pushing and hitting, and he was billed before the other two in the credits. Moe was credited as "Harry Howard."

In the film, the Stooges use one of their longest running gags. This same gag was used not only in many of their short films and feature length films but also in their final feature length film Kook's Tour.

- "Is there gas in the tank?"
- "The arrow points half way. I don't know if it's half empty or half full."

This is the first film where the Stooges sing a cappella style: "You'll Never Know What Tears Are" as well as the only time they sang it in a film with Shemp.

Heinie Conklin portrays one of the firemen. Conklin later made appearances in the Stooges' films at Columbia.

== Home media ==
- Soup to Nuts. Beverly Hills, CA, US: Twentieth Century Fox Home Entertainment. 2005. ASIN B0007IO77W. OCLC 1251705477.
