= China Gate (1957 film) =

1957 film by Samuel Fuller

- Theatrical poster
- Directed by: Samuel Fuller
- Written by: Samuel Fuller
- Produced by: Samuel Fuller
- Starring: Gene Barry; Angie Dickinson
- Cinematography: Joseph F. Biroc; Cinemascope
- Edited by: Gene Fowler Jr.
- Music by: Victor Young; Max Steiner
- Color process: Black and white
- Production company: Globe Enterprises
- Distributed by: 20th Century Fox
- Release date: May 22, 1957 (New York City)
- Running time: 96 minutes
- Country: United States
- Language: English
- Budget: $150,000

China Gate is a 1957 American CinemaScope war film written, produced and directed by Samuel Fuller and released through 20th Century Fox. The film is set during the First Indochina War (1946–1954), and depicts the relationship between a sergeant of the French Foreign Legion and the Eurasian wife whom he had abandoned.

== Plot ==
Sergeant Brock and Goldie are American Korean War veterans now serving as French Foreign Legion mercenaries in the First Indochina War. Brock's wife is a "half caste" Chinese-European named "Lucky Legs" who resorts to smuggling to feed her five-year-old son she had with Brock. Brock abandoned her and the baby when he was born with Asian features, feeling a "half breed" would not be welcome in America; an attitude towards miscegenation prevalent at the time. Lucky is recruited by the French high command to use her expertise of the area and her connection to the communist Major Cham to get a demolition squad of Legionnaires led by Brock to a vital hidden Viet Minh ammunition dump on the border with Red China. In return for her services, Lucky is promised by the French that they will arrange for her five-year-old son's emigration to America.

The raid is filled with animosity between the former lovers, booby traps, and enemy patrols. On arrival at the ammunition dump hidden in a mountain, Lucky discovers the commanding officer is her former friend, Major Cham, who wants to take her and her son to a new life in Moscow. Cham is a high flyer corporate executive (in the manner of Fuller's gangsters in Underworld U.S.A.) marked for great things in the world of international communism. The sabotage mission is successful but at great cost, as Lucky dies blowing up the dump. Brock reconciles with his child and is last seen walking along holding his hand in preparation for returning to America, as Goldie reprises the title song.

== Cast ==
- Gene Barry as Sgt. Brock
- Angie Dickinson as Lucky Legs
- Nat King Cole as Goldie
- Paul Dubov as Capt. Caumont
- Lee Van Cleef as Maj. Cham
- George Givot as Cpl. Pigalle
- Gerald Milton as Pvt. Andreades
- Neyle Morrow as Leung
- Marcel Dalio as Father Paul
- Maurice Marsac as Col. De Sars
- Warren Hsieh as The Boy
- Paul Busch as Cpl. Kruger
- Sasha Harden as Pvt. Jaszi
- James Hong as Charlie
- Willie Soo Hoo as Moi Leader (as William Soo Hoo)
- Walter Soo Hoo as Guard
- Weaver Levy as Khuan

== Soundtrack ==
China Gate was the last score Victor Young composed; the film was finished by his friend Max Steiner. Harold Adamson wrote lyrics to Young's beautiful theme for the film. Though originally not intending to sing in the film, Cole sang China Gate as he walked through a bombed out village followed by Brock's little son, making it a memorable tune and a fitting tribute to Young.

China Gate was released as a cover version in 2001 by Chris Whitley.

== Bans ==
Before China Gate was to be released, Fuller received a call from Romain Gary, the French Consul-General in Los Angeles, inviting him to lunch. Gary said the film's prologue was too harsh towards France and asked Fuller to change it. Fuller refused, but the two became firm friends with similar interests. The film was never released in France. Many years later, Fuller filmed a story of Gary's, White Dog (1982), that Fuller and Curtis Hanson adapted for the screen.

The film was also banned in Israel for "excessive cruelty" towards Russian and Chinese soldiers.

== Home media ==
China Gate was released on DVD and Blu-ray Disc by Mongrel Media on March 26, 2013.

== See also ==
- List of American films of 1957
