= Nertsery Rhymes =

1933 American film by Jack Cummings

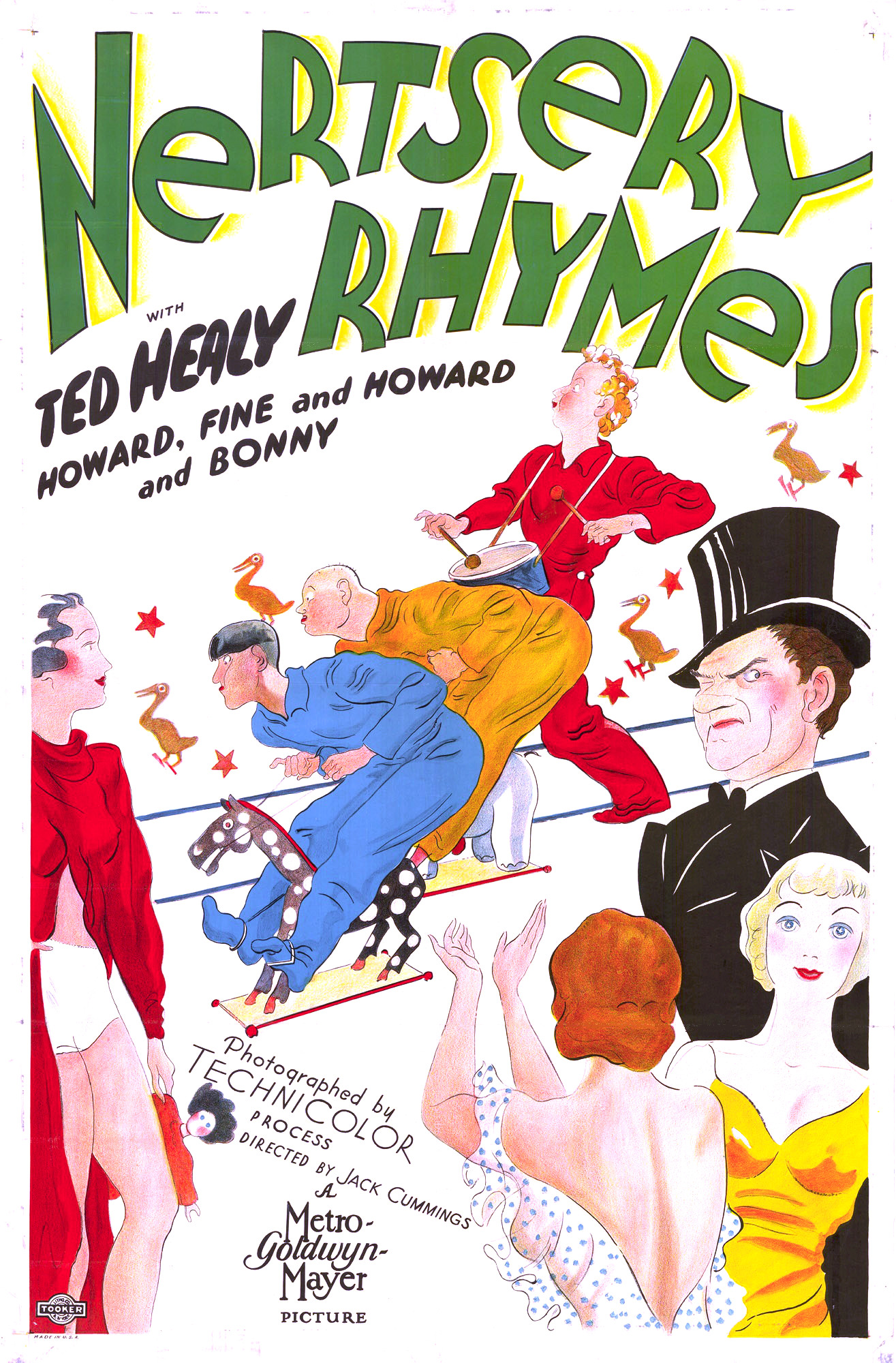
- Film poster
- Directed by: Jack Cummings
- Written by: Moe Howard; Ted Healy; Matt Brooks
- Starring: Ted Healy; Moe Howard; Larry Fine; Curly Howard; Bonnie Bonnell
- Color process: Two-color Technicolor
- Distributed by: Metro-Goldwyn-Mayer
- Release date: July 6, 1933
- Running time: 20:07
- Country: United States
- Language: English

Nertsery Rhymes is a 1933 American Pre-Code musical comedy short film starring Ted Healy and His Stooges, released on July 6, 1933, by Metro-Goldwyn-Mayer. It is the first of five short films the comedy team made for the studio. The others are Plane Nuts (1933), Hello Pop! (1933), Beer and Pretzels (1933), and The Big Idea (1934).

== Plot ==
The Stooges play Ted Healy's children who refuse to go to sleep unless they are told a bedtime story. Healy first tries singing a comic version of The Midnight Ride of Paul Revere which ultimately fails putting the young lads to sleep. Healy's date, the Good Fairy (Bonnie Bonnell) then tells them her own bedtime story, courtesy of a musical revue.

The trio eventually turn in for the evening, only to have Curly request a second bedtime story. Healy and the Good Fairy then proceed to tell the children about The Woman in the Shoe. When that fails to work, a frustrated Healy smacks the three lads over the head with a rubber mallet, knocking them unconscious. After Healy leaves on a date with the Good Fairy, the trio woke up and also went on a date with three dancing girls, ending the story.

== Cast ==
- Ted Healy as Papa
- Moe Howard as son 1
- Larry Fine as son 2
- Curly Howard as son 3
- Bonnie Bonnell as The Good Fairy

== Uncredited cast ==
- Beth Dodge as Turn of a Fan Dancer
- Betty Dodge as Turn of a Fan Dancer
- Lottice Howell as Turn of a Fan Singer
- The Rounders as Woman in Shoe Quintet
- Ethelind Terry as The Woman in the Shoe

== Production notes ==
Nertsery Rhymes was the first of three MGM Stooge-related shorts filmed using the two-color Technicolor process, originally billed as Colortone Musical Revues. This process would also be used in Hello Pop! (1933), again starring Healy, Bonnell and the Stooges, as well as Roast-Beef and Movies (1934), a film featuring Curly Howard's only known solo appearance apart from the Stooges. The use of color was predicated on the decision to build plot devices in Nertsery Rhymes around the following discarded Technicolor musical numbers from 1930 MGM films:

- "The Woman in the Shoe" from the musical Lord Byron of Broadway;
- "The Turn of a Fan" from the unreleased feature The March of Time.

== Home Video Releases ==
Nertsery Rhymes was released on DVD September 14, 2014 as part of the Warner Archive Collection Classic Shorts from the Dream Factory, Volume 3, which includes all 5 Ted Healy and His Stooges MGM shorts as well as the 2-color 1934 MGM short Roast-Beef and Movies featuring Jerome "Curly" Howard.
