= Plane Nuts =

1933 American short film by Jack Cummings

- Directed by: Jack Cummings
- Written by: Ted Healy; Matty Brooks
- Starring: Ted Healy; Moe Howard; Larry Fine; Curly Howard; Bonnie Bonnell; Geneva Mitchell; Mary Halsey; Kathryn Crawford; Loretta Andrews; Gus Arnheim and His Orchestra
- Cinematography: Busby Berkeley
- Music by: Jimmy McHugh; Dorothy Fields
- Distributed by: Metro-Goldwyn-Mayer
- Release date: October 14, 1933
- Running time: 19:41
- Country: United States
- Language: English

Plane Nuts was released by Metro-Goldwyn-Mayer on October 14, 1933, and is the fourth of five short subjects starring Ted Healy and His Stooges (Moe Howard, Larry Fine and Curly Howard). The others are Nertsery Rhymes (1933), Hello Pop! (1933), Beer and Pretzels (1933), and The Big Idea (1934). A musical-comedy film, Plane Nuts features Bonnie Bonnell as Healy's love interest. The Stooges were billed as "Howard, Fine and Howard."

== Cast ==
- Ted Healy as himself
- Moe Howard as Moe
- Larry Fine as Larry
- Curly Howard as Curly
- Bonnie Bonnell as Woman with Flowers

== Uncredited cast ==
- Albertina Rasch Dancers as Themselves
- Lorretta Andrews as Chorus Girl
- Mildred Dixon as Chorus Girl
- Mary Halsey as Chorus Girl
- Nelly Loren as showgirl

== Production notes ==
The musical numbers "Happy Landing" and "Dance Until Dawn" were lifted from the 1931 MGM feature film Flying High.

The Stooges and Healy were to appear in a segment where they fly around the world backwards, but it was cut from the final version. This footage is discussed, with production photos, in Leonard Maltin's 1990 television documentary The Lost Stooges.

== Home Video Releases ==
Plane Nuts was released on DVD September 14, 2014 as part of the Warner Archive Collection Classic Shorts from the Dream Factory, Volume 3, which includes all 5 Ted Healy and His Stooges MGM shorts as well as the 2-color 1934 MGM short Roast-Beef and Movies featuring Jerome "Curly" Howard.

== See also ==
- The Three Stooges filmography
