= Fred Sanborn =

American vaudeville performer (1899–1961)

- Born: November 23, 1899; Haverhill, Massachusetts, U.S.
- Died: March 9, 1961 (aged 61); Cupertino, California, U.S.
- Occupations: Actor, comedian, musician
- Years active: 1930–1950

Fred C. Sanborn (November 23, 1899 – March 9, 1961) was an American vaudeville performer, actor, and musician. He was most notable as a member of Ted Healy's comedy troupe Ted Healy and his Southern Gentlemen (a group which included the trio that became the famous Three Stooges).

Sanborn was frequently featured in the group's early vaudeville acts, as well as their 1929 Broadway show, A Night in Venice (the first of Sanborn's three Broadway musicals/revues). However, after starring with Healy, Moe Howard, Larry Fine, and Shemp Howard in the Rube Goldberg film Soup to Nuts—for which Sanborn also wrote a song—he left the group, preferring to concentrate on his music rather than become known as a "Healyite". Sanborn's character was somewhat similar to Charlie Chaplin's Tramp character; a small man with a lopsided walk who rather than speaking, whispers in other characters' ears while waggling his thick eyebrows. He appeared in films sporadically throughout the 1930s-1940s- two with Olsen and Johnson- often in small, unspeaking comedy roles; a rare exception was his final film, the 1945 musical comedy Night Club Girl, in which he acts as an emcee and does have several lines.

His live act usually incorporated playing of a xylophone and pantomime. His wife often assisted in his show by preparing and performing off-stage gags to which he would react on stage.

His last television performance was as a comedian on The Ed Wynn Show in 1950. Sanborn died on March 9, 1961 at Cupertino, California.

== Filmography ==
- Soup to Nuts (1930)
- Here Comes The Band (1935) (also featured Ted Healy)
- Hellzapoppin' (1941) (also featured Shemp Howard)
- Crazy House (1943) (playing "Jumbo" to Shemp's "Mumbo")
- Lucky Cowboy (1944) (short film)
- National Barn Dance (1944)
- Night Club Girl (1945)
