= The Big Idea (1934 film) =

1934 American film by William Beaudine

- Directed by: William Beaudine
- Written by: Ted Healy; Matty Brooks
- Starring: Ted Healy; The Three Stooges; Bonnie Bonnell; Muriel Evans; Heinie Conklin; Lew Harvey; Jimmy Hollywood; Eddie Bartell; Henry Taylor; Tut Mace; MGM Dancing Girls
- Music by: L. Wolfe Gilbert
- Distributed by: Metro-Goldwyn-Mayer
- Release date: May 12, 1934 (U.S.)
- Running time: 19:15
- Country: United States
- Language: English

The Big Idea was released by Metro-Goldwyn-Mayer on May 12, 1934, and is the fifth and last of five short films starring Ted Healy and His Stooges. The others are Nertsery Rhymes (1933), Plane Nuts (1933), Hello Pop! (1933), and Beer and Pretzels (1933). This act consisted of Ted Healy, Moe Howard, Larry Fine and Curly Howard. The latter 3 left the act in March 1934 to form The Three Stooges.

== Plot ==
A scenario company president, played by Ted Healy, is trying to think but never ending visits to his office have him distracted. Being visited by a man with a gun, a woman who loves making a mess, and a trio of musicians can be distracting to anyone. Trying to think while all these wackos keep interrupting, hilarity is sure to ensue.

== Cast ==
- Ted Healy as Scenario Company President
- Moe Howard as Healy's Stooge (as Howard)
- Larry Fine as Healy's Stooge (as Fine)
- Curly Howard as Healy's Stooge (as Howard)
- Bonnie Bonnell as Cleaning Lady
- Muriel Evans as Honey, Ted's Fiancée
- The Radio Rogues as Themselves (as Three Radio Rogues)
- Tut Mace as Dancer
- M-G-M Dancing Girls as Themselves

== Production ==
Like other shorts Healy and the Stooges filmed at MGM, stock footage was utilized to fill out the 20 minutes. For The Big Idea, MGM used musical numbers edited out of the feature films Dancing Lady (1933), which has a supporting role by Healy and a cameo by the Stooges, and Going Hollywood (1933).

This is one of the last films and the fifth and final musical-comedy short subject in which the Three Stooges appeared with longtime partner Ted Healy. By the time of the release of The Big Idea, the Three Stooges had signed a new contract with Columbia Pictures to do a series of comedy short films without Healy, beginning with Woman Haters (1934).

== Home Video Releases ==
The Big Idea was released on DVD in 2014 as part of the Warner Archive Collection Classic Shorts from the Dream Factory, Volume 3, which includes all 5 Ted Healy and His Stooges MGM shorts as well as the 2-color 1934 MGM short Roast-Beef and Movies featuring Jerome "Curly" Howard. The Big Idea is included as an extra on the Warner Archive Collection Blu-ray release of the 1934 movie Manhattan Melodrama. The Blu-ray was released October 28, 2025.
