= Jack O'Diamonds =

Musical play

Jack O'Diamonds is a musical play with music by Noel Gay and book and lyrics by Clifford Grey and H.F. Maltby. It opened at London's Gaiety Theatre on 25 February 1935.

The New York Times reported that it opened to good notices and that its American star, Zelma O'Neal "scored a triumph". One critic said of her pairing with co-star Reginald Purdell: "The spirit with which these two combine lends life and a touch of originality to the whole production".
