= The March of Time (film) =

Unreleased 1930 American film

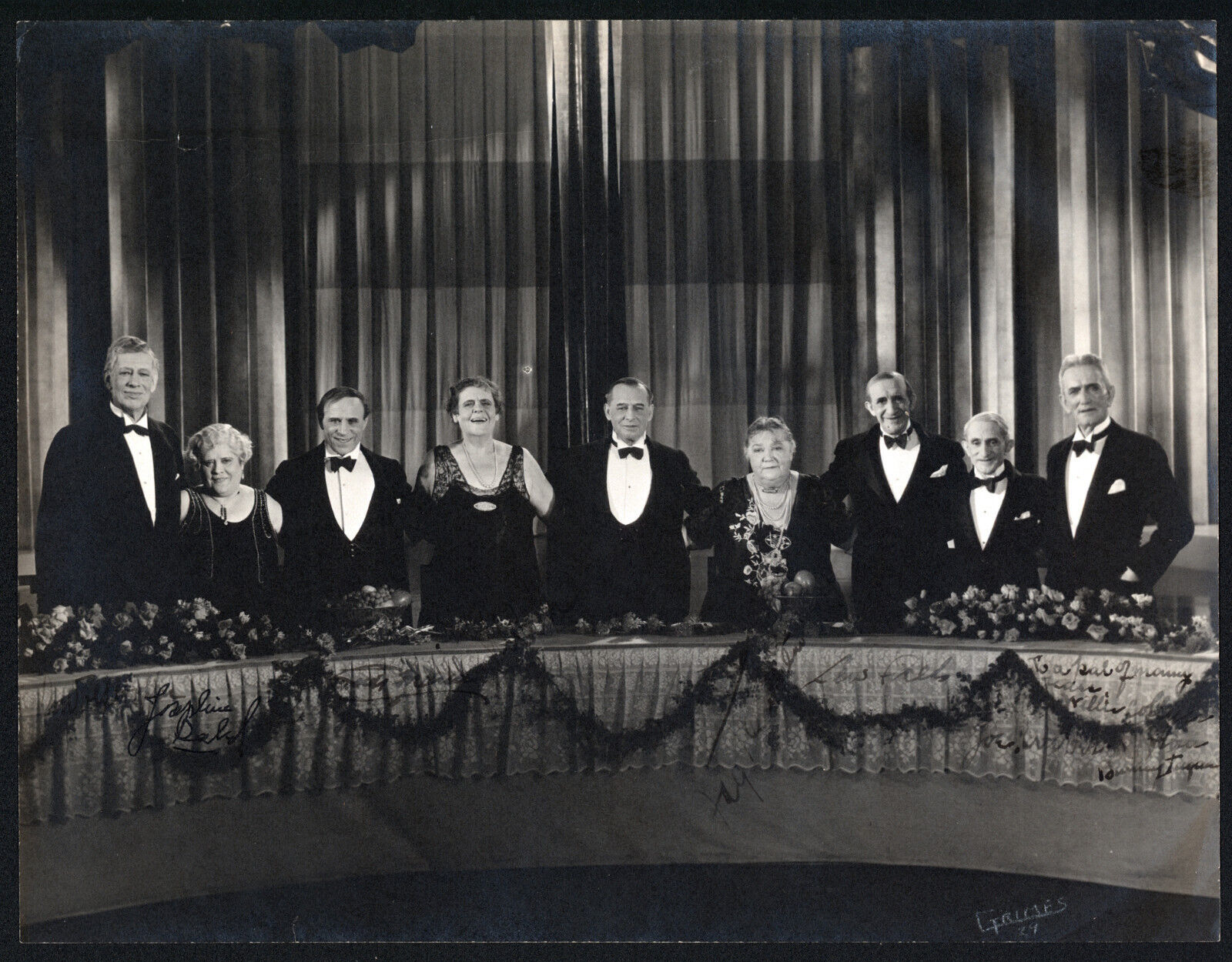
- l to r: De Wolfe Hopper, Josephine Sabel, Louis Mann, Marie Dressler, William Collier Sr., Fay Templeton, Lew Fields, Joe Weber Barney Fagan
- Directed by: Charles Reisner
- Produced by: Harry Rapf
- Production company: Metro-Goldwyn-Mayer
- Running time: Unknown (Unfinished - probably 1 hours?)
- Country: United States
- Language: English

The March of Time is the title of an unreleased 1930 American pre-Code musical film directed by Charles Reisner. The film was originally scheduled to be released in September 1930 by Metro-Goldwyn-Mayer (MGM) but was shelved. The March of Time would have been one of the many musicals partially filmed in two-color Technicolor.

== Production ==
The unfinished film was originally titled Hollywood Revue of 1930 and was conceived by producer Harry Rapf as a follow-up to MGM's The Hollywood Revue of 1929, which he had also produced. The film was retitled The March of Time, as it was to consist of three sections which featured past performers from the stage and the vaudeville circuit, then-present-day performers and up-and-coming performers. Production began in Fall 1929, but by October 1930 MGM had decided to shelve the project as interest for musicals or musical revues had waned.

Among the performers who filmed scenes for The March of Time were Joe Weber and Lew Fields of the Weber and Fields comedy team, Gus Edwards, Fay Templeton, Marie Dressler, Van and Schenck, DeWolf Hopper Sr., Buster Keaton, Albertina Rasch and her dancers, Polly Moran, Cliff Edwards, Benny Rubin, Ramon Novarro performing "Long Ago in Alcala," Bing Crosby performing "Poor Little G-String,"the Duncan Sisters performing "Graduation Day," Barney Fagan performing a soft shoe routine, and Raquel Torres performing "The Story of An Old Spanish Clock".

In order to salvage the $750,000 ($14.5 million in 2025) that had already been spent on the film, MGM announced plans to use the footage in a planned project starring Jimmy Durante that was to be released in 1932. That project was also abandoned. Footage from The March of Time later found its way into the musical shorts The Devil's Cabaret (1930), Crazy House (1930), Nertsery Rhymes (1933), Hello Pop! (1933) and Jail Birds of Paradise (1934). MGM's 1931 musical revue Wir schalten um auf Hollywood (We Tune In to Hollywood), produced for the German market, also featured many sequences from The March of Time. MGM considered foreign versions for the French and Spanish speaking markets as well, but the box office failure of The Hollywood Revue of 1929 in France eliminated that possibility. The Technicolor finale of March of Time along with some black-and-white sequences were included in Broadway to Hollywood (1933). Footage from the unfinished film also appears in That's Entertainment! III (1994).

== See also ==
- List of early color feature films
