= Albertina Rasch =

Austrian-born American dancer and choreographer (1891–1967)

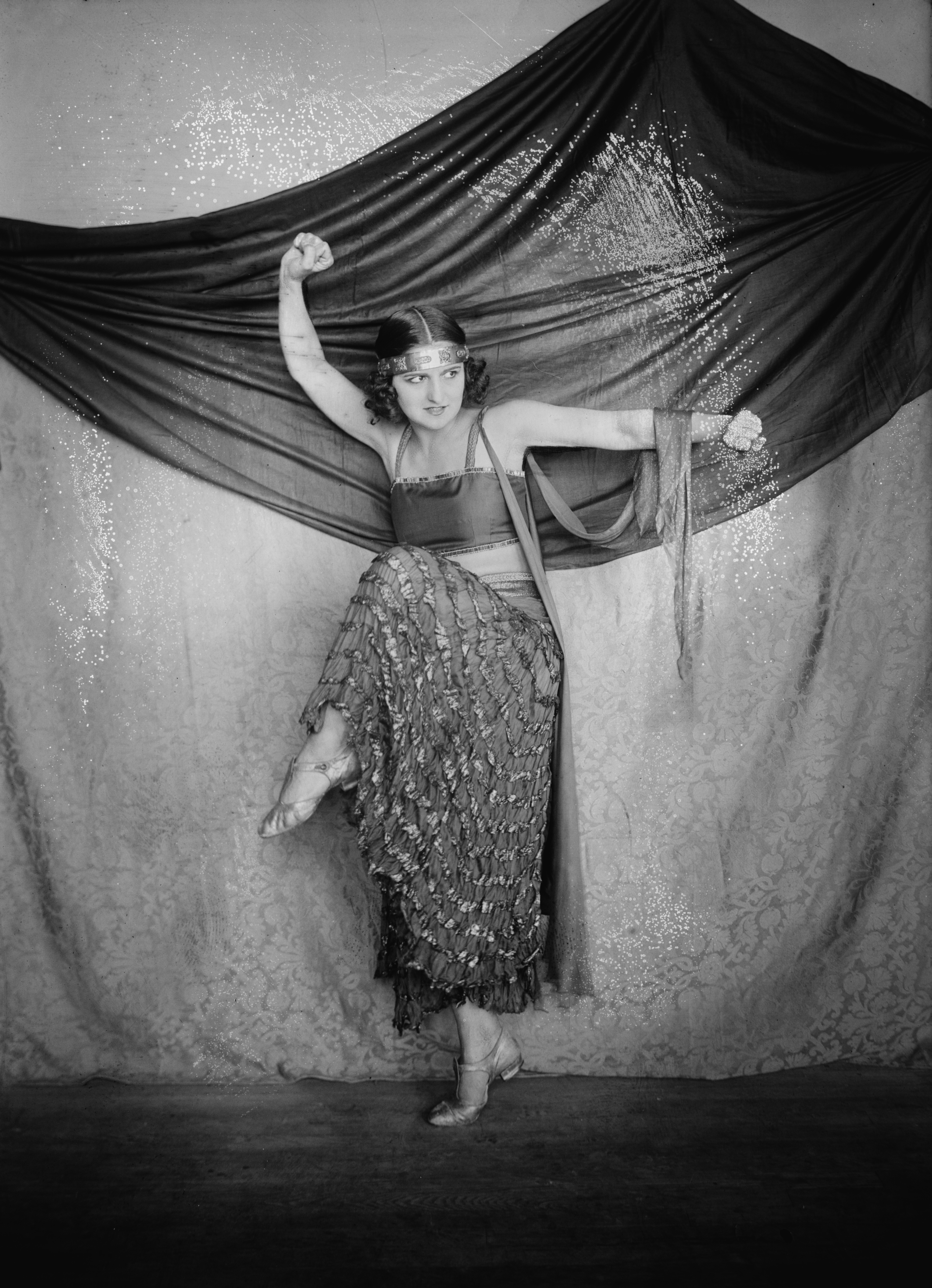
- Albertina Rasch, circa 1915
- Born: January 19, 1891; Vienna, Austria-Hungary (now Austria)
- Died: October 2, 1967 (aged 76); Woodland Hills, Los Angeles, California, U.S.
- Occupations: Dancer, choreographer, ballerina
- Spouse: Dimitri Tiomkin (1927–1967)

Albertina Rasch (January 19, 1891 – October 2, 1967) was an Austrian-American dancer, company director, and choreographer.

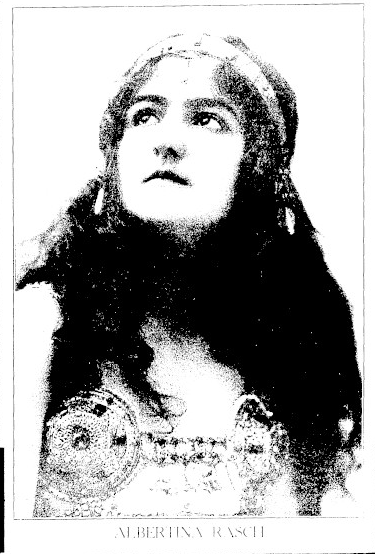
Albertina Rasch on the cover of Player magazine, January 17, 1913.

== Early life ==
Rasch was born in 1891 (although she would later shave five years off her age), in Vienna (in what was then Austria-Hungary), to a family of Polish Jewish descent. She grew up studying in an imperial dancing school, the Vienna State Opera House, and "worked her way up to the position of ballerina through that institution."

== Career ==
Rasch began performing before the age of fourteen. During the American “dance craze” of the 1910s, she left Vienna for the United States, appearing in shows at the New York Hippodrome, also known as “the National Amusement Institution of America” and the Winter Garden. She also “appeared with opera companies, including the metropolitan, Los Angeles, and Chicago operas” before becoming première danseuse for the Century Opera Company.

In 1915, Rasch stated in an article in Musical America that “she wished to take a company of girls on tour, “just as Pavlowa has done with her Russians.”” During 1916 and 1917, Rasch toured with Sarah Bernhardt before returning to New York as a concert performer with a supporting ballet troupe. That troupe marked the beginning of the Albertina Rasch Dancers, “a troupe of highly disciplined and balletically trained girls who performed in many revues, musicals, and recitals during the 1920s and 1930s.” The dancers often “wore skimpy costumes and performed in chorus-girl formations."

Rasch later signed a “contract with the Keith-Albee circuit for the seasons 1919-1922." On those vaudeville tours, “she often performed alongside “Negro” jazz bands as they were referred to at the time."

In 1923, Rasch opened her first dance studio in Manhattan (where Bill Robinson taught tap). She would later open a second studio in Los Angeles. Throughout the 1920s, Rasch’s school transformed "from a dance school offering a range of dance styles, including a Pavlova-esque free-form ballet, to an enterprise focused on turning out her “Albertina Rasch Girls." Rasch felt that the precision of the dancers would “make ballet dancing acceptable to American tastes.” She and her school would later further focus on dance as a “way to develop grace, charm, slenderness, and attractiveness.”

In 1925, the Albertina Rasch Dancers performed her Rhapsody in Blue (1925), one of her “first experiments combining ballet moves with American Jazz dance.”

She starred in a number of Ziegfeld productions, appeared at the Moulin Rouge and performed with Josephine Baker before adapting her classical training and techniques for the Broadway theatre and films.

Rasch's early stage work for such projects as George White's Scandals evoked the Black Crook tradition of inserting fantasy dance sequences that had little to do with the plot between book scenes. In 1930 she created the dances for the revue, Three's A Crowd. The New York Times said "... Mme. Rasch, director of the dances, who has made a pleasant departure from music show routine . . ." She soon established herself as a creative force with a routine she devised for Tilly Losch in the 1931 revue, The Band Wagon. Wearing gloves covered with blacklight paint, Losch stood in front of a mirror on a darkened stage and performed a "ballet" in which only her hands could be seen to the Arthur Schwartz and Howard Dietz song "Dancing in the Dark".

Rasch also helped establish Cole Porter's "Begin the Beguine" as a popular standard by choreographing it to an ethnic dance in Jubilee (1935). Additional Broadway credits include The Three Musketeers, Rio Rita (1927), Show Girl (1929), The Bohemian Girl, The Great Waltz (1934), Lady in the Dark (1941), and Marinka (1945).

At Metro-Goldman-Mayer (MGM), Rasch specialized in “balletic spectacles and operettas” in Hollywood. She “supervised and directed almost all of the camera work on her dances” and “was the only established female dance director in Hollywood." Some of her credits include: Rogue Song (1930), The Merry Widow (1934) with Jeanette MacDonald and Maurice Chevalier, Broadway Melody of 1936 (1936) with Jack Benny and Eleanor Powell, The Firefly (1937), Rosalie (1937) with Powell and Nelson Eddy, Sweethearts (1938), The Great Waltz (1938), The Girl of the Golden West (1938) with MacDonald and Eddy, Marie Antoinette (1938) with Norma Shearer, and Broadway Melody of 1940 (1940) with Fred Astaire.

Footage of Rasch filmed for the unfinished Metro-Goldwyn-Mayer musical The March of Time (1930) was used in the MGM film Broadway to Hollywood (1933) with Frank Morgan and Alice Brady. MGM also reused her "Chinese Ballet" from Lord Byron of Broadway (1930) in the short film Roast Beef and Movies (1934).

== Personal life ==
Rasch married composer Dimitri Tiomkin in 1927; they remained married until her death on October 2, 1967, at age 76 in Woodland Hills, California, following a prolonged illness.

== See also ==
- Inga Andersen, assistant, student, and one of the Seven Albertina Rasch dancers
