= Lord Byron of Broadway =

1930 American musical drama film

- Directed by: Harry Beaumont; William Nigh
- Written by: Nell Martin (novel); Crane Wilbur
- Starring: Charles Kaley; Ethelind Terry; Marion Shilling; Clifton Edwards
- Cinematography: Henry Sharp
- Edited by: Anne Bauchens
- Music by: Songs:: Nacio Herb Brown (music); Arthur Freed (lyrics)
- Distributed by: Metro-Goldwyn-Mayer
- Release date: February 28, 1930
- Running time: 77 minutes
- Country: United States
- Language: English

Lord Byron of Broadway (1930), also known as What Price Melody?, is an American Pre-Code musical drama film, directed by Harry Beaumont and William Nigh. It was based on a best selling book by Nell Martin, which "was widely praised by critics as an extremely true and amusing romance of stage life." It was filmed in black and white with two-color Technicolor sequences.

== Plot ==
Lord Byron of Broadway (1930)

Starting and ending relationships gives a composer (Charles Kaley) ideas for songs, until he meets and marries a woman Marion Shilling.

== Cast ==
- Charles Kaley as Roy Erskine
- Ethelind Terry as Ardis Trevelyn
- Marion Shilling as Nancy Clover
- Cliff Edwards as Joe Lundeen
- Gwen Lee as Bessie ("Bess")
- Benny Rubin as Phil
- Jack Byron as Mr. Millaire (as John Byron)
- Gino Corrado as Riccardi
- Iris Adrian As Lady In The Audience (uncredited)
- Jack Benny As Radio Voice (uncredited)
- Ann Dvorak As Chorus Girl (uncredited)

== Soundtrack ==
Charles Kaley recorded two of the songs for Brunswick Records (Record Number 4718). These songs were "Should I" and "A Bundle of Love Letters". Both of these songs proved to be major song hits in late 1929 and early 1930 and were recorded by numerous artists. For example, James Melton and Lewis James recorded vocal versions of "A Bundle of Love Letters" while Frank Munn recorded "Should I".

- "A Bundle of Love Letters"

(1930)
Music by Nacio Herb Brown
Lyrics Arthur Freed
Played on piano by Marion Shilling and sung by Charles Kaley
Played on piano by Marion Shilling and sung by Cliff Edwards and Charles Kaley in a vaudeville show

- "The Japanese Sandman"

(1920)
Music Richard A. Whiting
Lyrics by Ray Egan
Sung by Cliff Edwards in his vaudeville show

- "The Doll Dance"

Music by Nacio Herb Brown
Lyrics Arthur Freed
Danced to by Rita Flynn and Hazel Craven in a vaudeville show

- "Blue Daughter of Heaven"

(1930)
Music by Dimitri Tiomkin
Lyrics by Ray Egan
Sung offscreen by James Burroughs and danced to by Albertina Rasch Ballet\

- "Should I?"

(1930)
Music by Nacio Herb Brown
Lyrics Arthur Freed
Sung by Charles Kaley at a nightclub
Reprised by Ethelind Terry at a recording studio
Played at the end

- "The Woman in the Shoe"

(1930)
Music by Nacio Herb Brown
Lyrics Arthur Freed
Sung by Ethelind Terry, an offscreen male singer and the chorus in a show
Danced to by the chorus
Reprised by male trio

- "Old Pal, Why Did You Leave Me?"

(1930)
Music by Nacio Herb Brown
Lyrics Arthur Freed
Played on piano and sung by Charles Kaley and Benny Rubin

- "Only Love Is Real"

(1930)
Music by Nacio Herb Brown
Lyrics Arthur Freed
Played on piano by Marion Shilling on radio and sung by an unidentified male singer
Reprised by Ethelind Terry on radio

- "You're the Bride and I'm the Groom"

(1930)
Music by Nacio Herb Brown
Lyrics Arthur Freed
Played on piano and sung by Charles Kaley

- "Love Ain't Nothin' But the Blues"

(1930)
(From "Chasing Rainbows (1930)")
Music by Louis Alter
Lyrics by Joe Goodwin
Played instrumentally

== Production ==
In 1928, MGM announced it was going to turn the novel Lord Byron of Broadway by Nell Martin into a musical starring stars William Haines and Bessie Love. However, as they both had mediocre singing voices, they were replaced by Charles Kaley, star of Earl Carroll's Vanities and Ethelind Terry, star of Florenz Ziegfeld's Rio Rita. At that time, Kaley and Terry were well-known stage stars. MGM used the "Woman in the Shoe" musical segment in two short films, Nertsery Rhymes (1933) and Roast Beef and Movies (1934).

== Critical response ==
The expensive film received mixed reviews, mainly due to the lackluster direction of William Nigh and Harry Beaumont. Its Technicolor sequences and musical score, however, were universally praised. "The story's strong enough to be festooned with Technicolored girls, ballets, songs and effects without breaking down," said Photoplay "You'll like this."

Sheet music sales and sales of phonograph records with songs from the film were brisk. "Should I" and "A Bundle of Old Love Letters" proved to be among the most popular song hits of the year 1930.

== See also ==
- List of early color feature films
