= Dimitri Tiomkin =

Russian and American composer (1894–1979)

- Tiomkin, c. 1930s
- Born: Dimitri Zinovievich Tiomkin; May 10, 1894; Kremenchug, Russian Empire (now in Ukraine)
- Died: November 11, 1979 (aged 85); London, England
- Occupation: Composer
- Years active: 1929–1979
- Notable work: High Noon; Giant
- Spouses: Albertina Rasch (m. 1926; died 1967) Olivia Patch (m. 1972)
- Website: dimitritiomkin.com

Dimitri Zinovievich Tiomkin (Note: Russian: Дмитрий Зиновьевич Тёмкин, romanized: Dmitry Zinovyevich Tyomkin, Ukrainian: Дмитро Зиновійович Тьомкін, romanized: Dmytro Zynovijovych Tiomkin) (May 10, 1894 – November 11, 1979) was a Russian (Note: Attributed to the following sources:) and American film composer and conductor. Classically trained in Saint Petersburg before the Bolshevik Revolution, he moved to Berlin and then New York City after the Russian Revolution. In 1929, after the stock market crash, he moved to Hollywood, where he became best known for his scores for Western films, including Duel in the Sun, Red River, High Noon, The Big Sky, 55 Days at Peking, Gunfight at the O.K. Corral, Rio Bravo, The Alamo, and Last Train from Gun Hill.

Tiomkin received 22 Academy Award nominations and won four Oscars: three for Best Original Score – for High Noon, The High and the Mighty, and The Old Man and the Sea – and one for Best Original Song for "The Ballad of High Noon" from High Noon.

== Early life and education ==
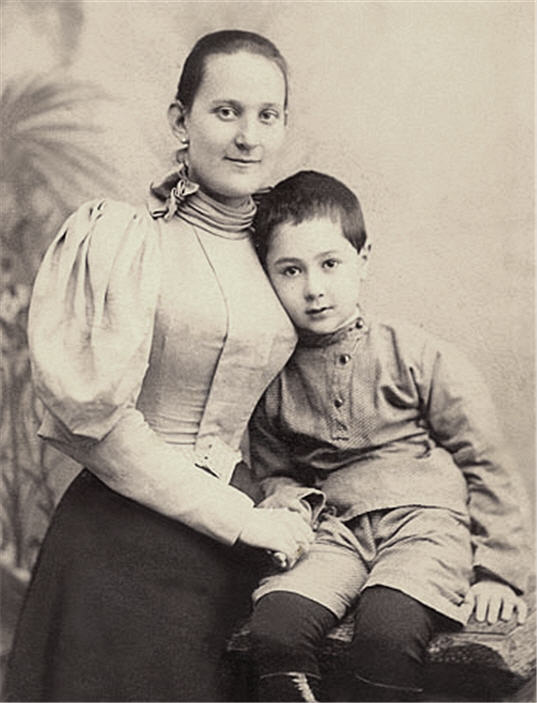
With his mother, circa 1900

Dimitri Zinovievich Tiomkin was born on May 10, 1894, in Kremenchug, a city then in the Poltava Governorate of the Russian Empire and now in Ukraine.

His family was of Jewish descent; his father, Zinovy Tiomkin, was a "distinguished pathologist" and associate of professor Paul Ehrlich, and later a notable Zionist leader. His mother, Maria Tartakovskaya, was a musician who began teaching the young Tiomkin piano at an early age. Her hope was to have her son become a professional pianist, according to Tiomkin biographer Christopher Palmer. Tiomkin described his mother as being "small, blonde, merry and vivacious."

Tiomkin was educated at the Saint Petersburg Conservatory, where he studied piano with Felix Blumenfeld, teacher of Vladimir Horowitz, and harmony and counterpoint with Alexander Glazunov, mentor to Sergei Prokofiev and Dmitri Shostakovich. He also studied piano with Isabelle Vengerova.

He survived the revolution and found work under the new regime. In 1920, while working for the Petrograd Military District Political Administration (PUR), Tiomkin was one of the lead organizers of two revolutionary mass spectacles, the Mystery of Liberated Labor, a mystery play for the May Day festivities, and The Storming of the Winter Palace for the celebrations of the third anniversary of the Bolshevik Revolution. He supported himself while living in Saint Petersburg by playing piano accompaniment for numerous Russian silent films. Tiomkin joined many exiles in moving to Berlin after the Russian Revolution to live with his father. In Berlin, from 1921 to 1923, he studied with the pianist Ferruccio Busoni and Busoni's disciples Egon Petri and Michael von Zadora. He composed light classical and popular music, and made his performing debut as a pianist playing Franz Liszt's Piano Concerto No. 2 with the Berlin Philharmonic.

He moved to Paris with his roommate, Michael Khariton, to perform a piano duo repertory together. They did this before the end of 1924.

== Career ==
In 1925, the duo received an offer from the New York theatrical producer Morris Gest and emigrated to the United States. They performed together on the Keith/Albee and Orpheum vaudeville circuits, in which they accompanied a ballet troupe run by the Austrian ballerina Albertina Rasch. Tiomkin and Rasch's professional relationship evolved into a personal one, and they married in 1927.

While in New York, Tiomkin gave a recital at Carnegie Hall that featured contemporary music by Maurice Ravel, Alexander Scriabin, Francis Poulenc, and Alexandre Tansman. He and his new wife went on tour to Paris in 1928, where he played the European premiere of American George Gershwin's Concerto in F at the Paris Opera, with Gershwin in the audience.

After the stock market crash in October 1929 reduced work opportunities in New York, Tiomkin and his wife moved to Hollywood, where she was hired to supervise dance numbers in MGM film musicals. He worked on some minor films, some without being credited under his own name. His first significant film score project was for Paramount's Alice in Wonderland (1933). Although Tiomkin worked on some smaller film projects, his goal was to become a concert pianist. In 1937, he broke his arm, injuring it so much that he ended that possible career. He began to focus on work as a film music composer.

=== Working for Frank Capra (1937–1946) ===
Tiomkin received his first break from Columbia director Frank Capra, who chose him to write and perform the score for Lost Horizon (1937). The film gained significant recognition for Tiomkin in Hollywood. It was released the same year that he became a naturalized US citizen.

In his autobiography, Please Don't Hate Me! (1959), Tiomkin recalls how the assignment by Capra forced him to first confront a director in a matter of music style:

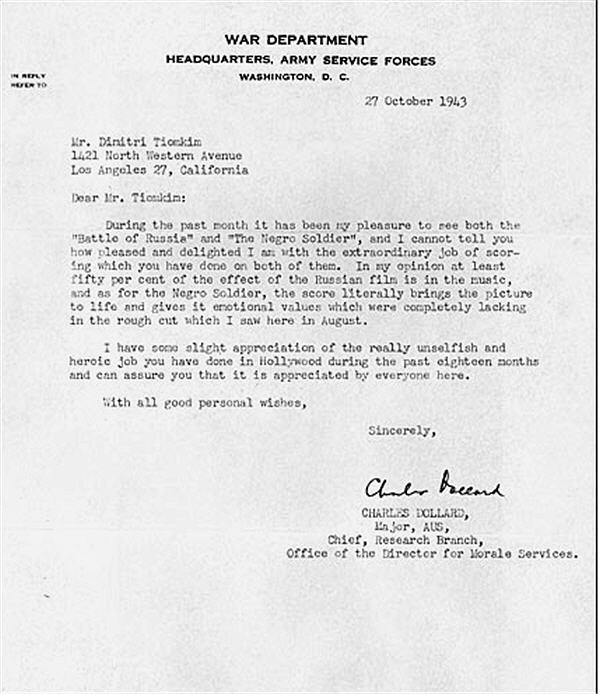
Army letter thanking Tiomkin

[H]e gave me the job without reservation. I could write the score without interference, and he would hear it when it was done. Lost Horizon offered me a superb chance to do something big.... I thought I might be going a little too far in the matter of expense, and went to Frank one day as he sat in the projection room [and explained the score.].... He looked shocked. "No, Dimi, the lama is a simple man. His greatness is in being simple. For his death, the music should be simple, nothing more than the muttering rhythm of a drum." "But Frank, death of lama is not ending one man, but is death of idea. Is tragedy applying to whole human race. I must be honest. Music should rise high, high. Should give symbolism of immense loss. Please don't hate me."

He worked on other Capra films during the following decade, including the comedy You Can't Take It With You (1938), Mr. Smith Goes to Washington (1939), Meet John Doe (1941), and It's a Wonderful Life (1946). During World War II, he continued his close collaboration with Capra by composing scores for his Why We Fight series. These seven films were commissioned by the US government to show American soldiers the reason for United States' participation in the war. They were later released to the general US public to generate support for American involvement.

Tiomkin credited Capra for broadening his musical horizons by shifting them away from a purely Eurocentric and romantic style to a more American style based on subject matter and story.

=== High Noon (1952) ===
Following his work for Fred Zinnemann on The Men (1950), Tiomkin composed the score for the same director's High Noon (1952). His theme song was "Do Not Forsake Me, Oh My Darlin'" ("The Ballad of High Noon"). At its opening preview to the press, the film, which starred Gary Cooper and Grace Kelly, did badly. Tiomkin writes that "film experts agreed that the picture was a flat failure.... The producers hesitated to release the picture." Tiomkin bought the rights to the song and released it as a single for the popular music market, with singer Frankie Laine. The record became an immediate success worldwide. Based on the song's popularity, the studio released the film four months later, with the words sung by country western star Tex Ritter. The film received seven Academy Award nominations and won four awards, including two for Tiomkin: Best Original Music and Best Song. Walt Disney presented him with both awards that evening.

According to film historian Arthur R. Jarvis Jr., the score "has been credited with saving the movie." Another music expert, Mervyn Cooke, agrees, adding that "the song's spectacular success was partly responsible for changing the course of film-music history". Tiomkin was the second composer to receive two Oscars (score and song) for the same dramatic film. (The first was Leigh Harline, who won Best Original Score for Disney's Pinocchio and Best Song for "When You Wish Upon a Star". Ned Washington wrote its lyrics as he did for "Do Not Forsake Me, Oh My Darlin".)

The song's lyrics briefly tell High Noon's entire story arc, a tale of cowardice and conformity in a small Western town. Tiomkin composed his entire score around this single western-style ballad. He also eliminated violins from the ensemble. He added a subtle harmonica in the background, to give the film a "rustic, deglamorized sound that suits the anti-heroic sentiments" expressed by the story.

According to Russian film historian Harlow Robinson, building the score around a single folk tune was typical of many Russian classical composers. Robinson adds that the source of Tiomkin's score, if indeed folk, has not been proven. The Encyclopedia of Modern Jewish Culture, on page 124, states: "The fifty-year period in the USA between 1914, the start of the First World War and the year of Irving Berlin's first full score, Watch Your Step, and 1964, the premiere of Bock and Harnick's Fiddler on the Roof, is informed by a rich musical legacy from Yiddish folk tunes (for example Mark Warshavsky's "Di milners trem," The miller's tears: and Dimitri Tiomkin's "Do Not Forsake Me." High Noon) ... "

Tiomkin won two more Oscars in subsequent years: for The High and the Mighty (1954), directed by William A. Wellman, and featuring John Wayne; and The Old Man and the Sea (1958), adapted from an Ernest Hemingway novel. During the 1955 ceremonies, Tiomkin thanked all of the earlier composers who had influenced him, including Beethoven, Tchaikovsky, Rimsky-Korsakov, and other names from the European classical tradition.

The composer worked again for Zinnemann on The Sundowners (1960).

=== Film genres and other associations ===
Many of his scores were for Western films, which were extremely popular in this period, and for which he is best remembered. His first Western was the King Vidor-directed Duel in the Sun (1946). In addition to High Noon, among his other Westerns were Giant (1956), Friendly Persuasion (1956), Gunfight at the O.K. Corral (1957), and Last Train from Gun Hill (1959). Rio Bravo (1959), The Alamo (1960), Circus World (1964) and The War Wagon (1967) were made with the involvement of John Wayne. Tiomkin received Oscar nominations for his scores in both Giant and The Alamo. He told TV host Gig Young that his aim in creating the score for Giant was to capture the "feelings of the great land and great state of Texas."

Although influenced by European music traditions, Tiomkin was self-trained as a film composer. He scored many films of various genres, including historical dramas such as Cyrano de Bergerac (1950), The Fall of the Roman Empire (1964), and Great Catherine (1968); war movies such as The Court-Martial of Billy Mitchell (1955), The Guns of Navarone (1961), and Town Without Pity (1961); and suspense thrillers such as 36 Hours (1965).

Tiomkin also wrote scores for four of Alfred Hitchcock's suspense dramas: Shadow of a Doubt (1943), Strangers on a Train (1951), I Confess (1953), and Dial M for Murder (1954). Here he used a lush style relying on solo violins and muted trumpets. He composed the score for the science fiction thriller The Thing from Another World (1951), which is considered his "strangest and most experimental score." He also worked with Howard Hawks on The Big Sky (1952) and Land of the Pharaohs (1955), with John Huston on The Unforgiven (1960), and with Nicholas Ray on 55 Days at Peking (1963).

=== Television ===
In addition to the cinema, Tiomkin composed for television, including such memorable theme songs as Rawhide (1959) and Gunslinger. Although Tiomkin was hired to compose the theme for The Wild Wild West (1965), the producers rejected his music and subsequently hired Richard Markowitz as his replacement.

Tiomkin also made a few cameo appearances on television programs. These include being the mystery challenger on What's My Line? and an appearance on Jack Benny's CBS program in December 1961, in which he attempted to help Benny write a song. He also appeared as a contestant on the October 20, 1955, episode of the TV quiz program You Bet Your Life, hosted by Groucho Marx.

He composed the music to the song "Wild Is The Wind". It was originally recorded by Johnny Mathis for the film Wild Is the Wind (1957).

=== Composition styles and significance ===
He's a Russian-born gentleman who has written just about the most American-sounding tunes you and I have ever heard.

— Gig Young, TV interview with Tiomkin in 1956

Although Tiomkin was a trained classical pianist, he adapted his music training in Russia to the rapidly expanding Hollywood film industry, and taught himself how to compose meaningful film scores for almost any story type. Film historian David Wallace notes that despite Tiomkin's indebtedness to Europe's classical composers, he would go on to express more than any other composer, "the American spirit—its frontier spirit, anyway—in film music."

Tiomkin had no illusions about his talent and the nature of his film work when compared to the classical composers. "I am no Prokofiev, I am no Tchaikovsky. But what I write is good for what I write for. So please, boys, help me." Upon receiving his Oscar in 1955 for The High and the Mighty, he became the first composer to publicly list and thank the great European masters, including Beethoven, Strauss, and Brahms, among others.

Music historian Christopher Palmer says that Tiomkin's "genius lay in coming up with themes and finding vivid ways of creating sonic color appropriate to the story and visual image, not in his ability to combine the themes into a complex symphonic structure that could stand on its own." In addition he speculates how a Russian-born pianist like Tiomkin, who was educated at a respected Russian music conservatory, could have become so successful in the American film industry:

He came from a Big Country, too, and in America's vastness, particularly its vast all-embracingness of sky and plain, he must have seen a reflection of the steppes of his native Ukraine. So the cowboy becomes a mirror image of the Cossacks: both are primitives and innocents, etched on and dwarfed by a landscape of soul-stirring immensity and rugged masculine beauty. And as an exile himself, Tiomkin would have identified with the cowboys, pioneers and early settlers who people the world of the Western ... . [T]hose like Tiomkin who blazed a trail in Hollywood were actually winning the West all over again.

Tiomkin alluded to this relationship in his autobiography:

A steppe is a steppe is a steppe... . The problems of the cowboy and the Cossack are very similar. They share a love of nature and a love of animals. Their courage and their philosophical attitudes are similar, and the steppes of Russia are much like the prairies of America.

=== Techniques of composing ===
Tiomkin's methods of composing a film score have been analyzed and described by music experts. Musicologist Dave Epstein, for one, has explained that after reading the script, Tiomkin would then outline the film's major themes and movements. After the film itself had been filmed, he would make a detailed study of the timing of scenes, using a stopwatch to arrange precise synchronization of the music with the scenes. He would complete the final score after assembling all the musicians and orchestra, rehearse a number of times, and then record the final soundtrack.

Tiomkin paid careful attention to the voices of the actors when composing. According to Epstein, he "found that in addition to the timbre of the voice, the pitch of the speaking voice must be very carefully considered...." To accomplish this, Tiomkin would go to the set during filming and would listen to each of the actors. He would also talk with them individually, noting the pitch and color of their voices.

Tiomkin explains why he took the extra time with actors:

The music has the function of helping describe the characters. It helps paint the portraits.... [Giving an example] It was my job to soften her face, to make her look more Continental, more refined. We did it with the music which accompanied her every appearance on the screen, by developing a delicate, graceful theme.

== Personal life and death ==
Tiomkin married Albertina Rasch in 1926; she died in 1967. In 1972, he married Olivia Patch, his secretary.

On November 11, 1979, Tiomkin died in London, England, two weeks after fracturing his pelvis in a fall. He was interred in Forest Lawn Memorial Park Cemetery in Glendale, California.

== Legacy ==
During the 1950s, Tiomkin was the highest-paid film composer, composing close to a rate of a picture each month, achieving his greatest fame during the 1950s and 1960s. Between 1948 and 1958, his "golden decade," he composed 57 film scores. In 1952, he composed nine film scores, including High Noon, for which he won two Academy Awards. In the same decade, he won two more Oscars and his film scores were nominated nine times.

In his lifetime, Tiomkin became known both for a memorable 1954 awards acceptance and for his ability to learn language. During his televised 1954 Oscars acceptance speech for "The High and the Mighty", it was noted that Tiomkin thanked classical composers Bach, Brahms, Beethoven, and Debussy rather than his modern-day colleagues. A 1957 New York Times article stated that Tiomkin had learned to speak Russian, German, Polish, Ukrainian, French, Italian, Yiddish, and English.

He was honored in the Soviet Union and Russia. In 1967, he was a member of the jury of the 5th Moscow International Film Festival. In 2014, his theme songs to It's a Wonderful Life and Giant were played during the closing ceremony for the 2014 Winter Olympics in Sochi, Russia.

Beginning with Lost Horizon in 1937, through his retirement from films in 1979, and until modern times, he is recognized as being the only Russian to have become a Hollywood film composer. Other Russian-born composers, such as Irving Berlin, wrote their scores for Broadway plays, many of which were later adapted to film.

Tiomkin was the first film score composer to write both the title theme song and the score. He expanded on that technique in many of his westerns, including High Noon and Gunfight at the O.K. Corral, in which the theme song was repeated as a common thread running through the entire film. For the film Red River his biographer Christopher Palmer describes how the music immediately sets the epic and heroic tone for the film:

The unison horn-call is indeed an invocation: the gates of history are flung wide and the main theme, high and wide as the huge vault of the sky, rides forth in full choral-orchestral splendour.

Because of this stylistic contribution to westerns, along with other film genres, using title and ongoing theme songs, he had the greatest impact on Hollywood films in the following decades up until the present. With many of his songs being used in the title of films, Tiomkin created what composer Irwin Bazelon called "title song mania." In subsequent decades, studios often attempted to create their own hit songs to both sell as a soundtrack and to enhance the movie experience, with a typical example being the film score for Titanic.

He was known to use "source music" in his scores. Some experts claim these were often based on Russian folk songs. Much of his film music, especially for westerns, was used to create an atmosphere of "broad, sweeping landscapes," with a prominent use of chorus. During a TV interview, he credited his love of the European classic composers along with his ability to adapt American folk music styles to creating grand American theme music.

A number of Tiomkin's film scores were released on LP soundtrack albums, including Giant and The Alamo. Some of the recordings, which usually featured Tiomkin conducting his own music, have been reissued on CD. The theme song to High Noon has been recorded by many artists, with one German CD producer, Bear Family Records, producing a CD with 25 different artists performing that one song.

In 1999, the US Postal Service added his image to their "Legends of American Music" stamp series. The series began with the issuance of one featuring singer Elvis Presley in 1993. Tiomkin's image was added as part of their "Hollywood Composers" selection.

In 1976, RCA Victor released Lost Horizon: The Classic Film Scores of Dimitri Tiomkin (US catalog ARL1-1669, UK catalog GL 43445) with Charles Gerhardt and the National Philharmonic Orchestra. Featuring highlights from various Tiomkin scores, the album was later reissued by RCA on CD with Dolby Surround Sound.

The American Film Institute ranked Tiomkin's score for High Noon as No. 10 on their list of the 100 greatest film scores. His scores for the following films were also nominated for the list:

- The Alamo (1960)
- Dial M for Murder (1954)
- Duel in the Sun (1946)
- Friendly Persuasion (1956)
- The Guns of Navarone (1961)
- Lost Horizon (1937)

== Awards and nominations ==
=== Academy Awards ===
- 1972 – nominated for "Best Music, Scoring Adaptation and Original Song" Score for Tchaikovsky (1969)
- 1965 – nominated for "Best Music, Score – Substantially Original" for The Fall of the Roman Empire (1964)
- 1964 – nominated (with Paul Francis Webster) for "Best Music, Original Song" for 55 Days at Peking (1963) for "So Little Time", sung by Andy Williams
- 1964 – nominated for "Best Music, Score – Substantially Original" for 55 Days at Peking (1963)
- 1962 – nominated for "Best Original Song" for Town Without Pity (1961)
- 1962 – nominated for "Best Scoring of a Dramatic or Comedy Picture" for The Guns of Navarone (1961)
- 1961 – nominated (with Paul Francis Webster) for "Best Music, Original Song" for The Alamo (1960) for "The Green Leaves of Summer", sung by The Brothers Four
- 1961 – nominated for "Best Scoring of a Dramatic or Comedy Picture" for The Alamo (1960)
- 1961 – nominated for "Best Original Song" for The Young Land (1959)
- 1959 – won an Oscar for "Best Scoring of a Dramatic or Comedy Picture" for The Old Man and the Sea (1958)
- 1958 – nominated for "Best Scoring of a Dramatic or Comedy Picture" for Wild Is the Wind (1957)
- 1957 – nominated for "Best Original Song" for "Friendly Persuasion", "Best Scoring of a Dramatic or Comedy Picture" for "Giant" (1956)
- 1955 – won an Oscar for "Best Scoring of a Dramatic or Comedy Picture" for The High and Mighty
- 1955 – nominated for "Best Original Song" for "The High and the Mighty" (1954)
- 1953 – won (with Ned Washington) an Oscar for "Best Original Song" for High Noon (1952) for "Do Not Forsake Me, Oh My Darlin'", sung by Tex Ritter
- 1953 – won an Oscar for "Best Music, Scoring of a Dramatic or Comedy Picture" for High Noon (1952)
- 1950 – nominated for "Best Scoring of a Dramatic or Comedy Picture" for Champion (1949)
- 1945 – nominated for "Best Scoring of a Dramatic or Comedy Picture" for The Bridge of San Luis Rey (1944)
- 1944 – nominated for "Best Scoring of a Dramatic or Comedy Picture" for The Moon and Sixpence (1943)
- 1943 – nominated for "Best Scoring of a Dramatic or Comedy Picture" for The Corsican Brothers (1941)
- 1940 – nominated for "Best Music, Scoring" for Mr. Smith Goes to Washington (1939)

=== Golden Globe Awards ===
- 1965 for "Best Original Score" for The Fall of the Roman Empire (1964)
- 1962 for "Best Motion Picture Score" for The Guns of Navarone (1961)
- 1962 for "Best Motion Picture Song" for Town without Pity (1961)
- 1961 for "Best Original Score" for The Alamo (1960)
- 1957 he received the "Special Award" as "Recognition for film music"
- 1955 he received the "Special Award" "For creative musical contribution to Motion Picture"
- 1953 for "Best Motion Picture Score" for High Noon (1952)
