= Ted Healy =

American vaudeville performer, comedian, and actor (1896–1937)

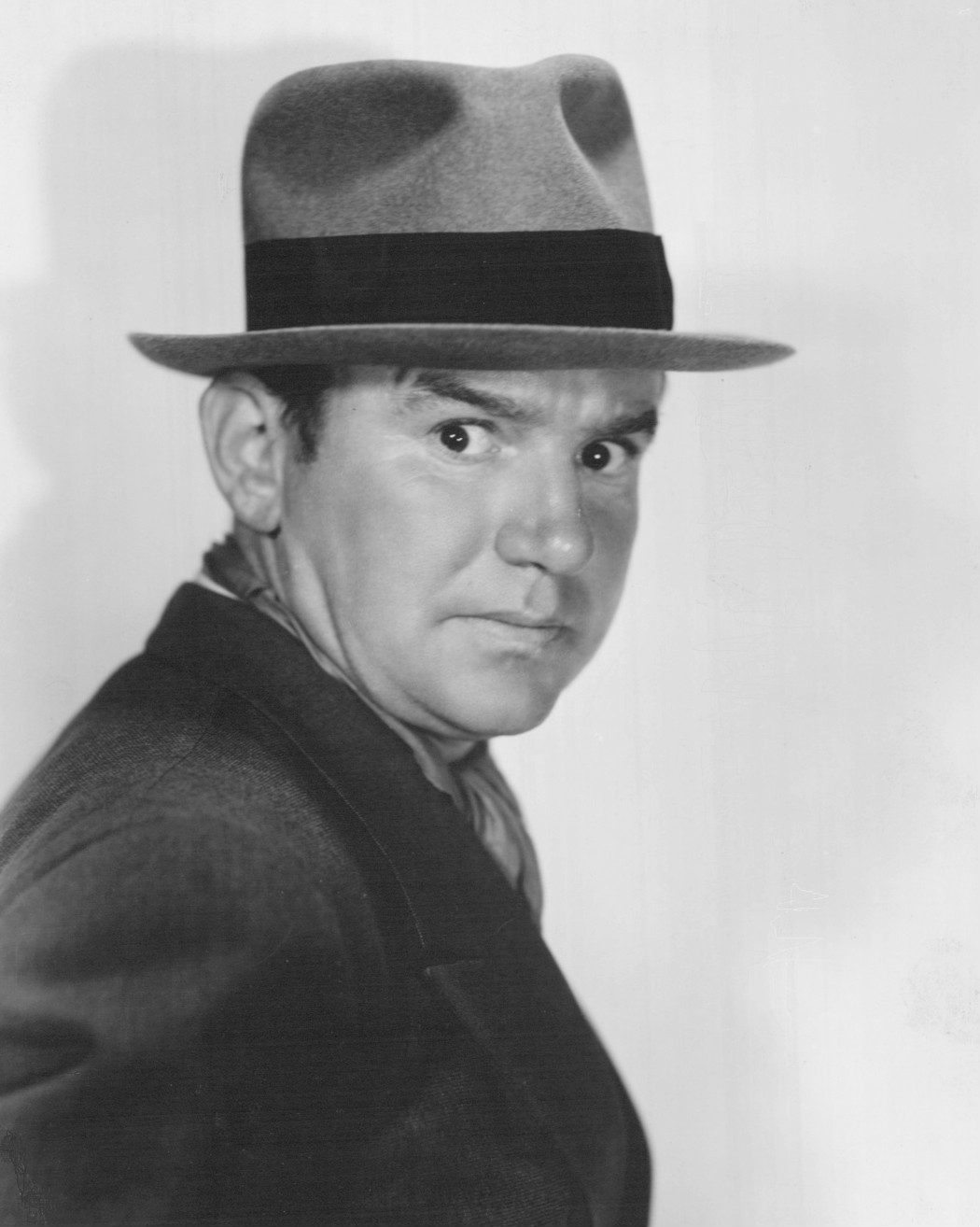
- Healy in 1937
- Born: Charles Ernest Lee Nash; October 1, 1896; Kaufman, Texas, U.S.
- Died: December 21, 1937 (aged 41); Los Angeles, California, U.S.
- Resting place: Calvary Cemetery (Los Angeles)
- Occupations: Comedian, actor
- Years active: 1912–1937
- Spouses: Betty Brown (m. 1922; div. 1932) Betty Hickman (m. 1936)
- Children: 1

Ted Healy (born Charles Ernest Lee Nash; October 1, 1896 – December 21, 1937) was an American vaudeville performer, comedian, and actor. Though he is chiefly remembered as the creator of the Three Stooges and the style of slapstick comedy that they later made famous, he had a successful stage and film career of his own and was cited as a formative influence by several later comedy stars.

== Early life ==
Healy was born on October 1, 1896, in Kaufman, Texas, to Charles McKinney Nash and Mary Eugenia (McGinty) Nash. Sources conflict on his precise birth name; most indicate he was born Charles Ernest Lee Nash, but according to baptismal records, he was born Ernest Lea Nash. He attended Holy Innocents School in Houston before the family, including his elder sister, Elizabeth Marcia Nash (1895–1972), who later appeared in two 1930s films in small roles under the stage name Marcia Healy (The Sitter Downers and The Great Ziegfeld), moved to New York City in 1908. While there, he attended high school at De La Salle Institute. Nash initially intended to become a businessman, but eventually decided on the stage.

== Show-business career ==
Nash made his first foray into show business in 1912 at the age of 15, when his childhood friend Moe Howard and he joined the Annette Kellerman Diving Girls, a vaudeville act that included four boys. The act ended quickly after an accident on stage, and Nash and Howard went their separate ways. Nash then developed a vaudeville act and adopted the stage name Ted Healy. His act was a hit, and Healy soon expanded his role as a comedian and master of ceremonies. In the 1920s, he was the highest-paid performer in vaudeville, making $9,000 a week (equivalent to about $166,000 in 2024). He added performers to his stage show, including his new wife, Betty Brown (Betty Braun), and his German Shepherd dog.

The Healys' revue toured, listed on the marquee as Syncopated Toes, and when some of his acrobats quit in late 1923, Moe Howard answered the advertisement for replacements. Since Howard was not an acrobat, Healy cast his old friend as a stooge (a purported member of the audience who is picked, ostensibly at random, to come onstage). In the routine, Howard's appearance would end with Healy losing his trousers.

=== Ted Healy and his Southern Gentlemen ===
Howard's brother Shemp joined the act as a heckler in early 1924, but both Howards temporarily left show business in mid-1925. Ted and Betty were hired in June 1925 to star in the Broadway revue Earl Carroll Vanities of 1925. Ted brought some of the routines he developed with the Howard brothers, using three comics under contract to Carroll, (Dave Chasen, Kenneth Lackey, and Lou Warren). After a contract dispute in which Carroll was determined to be in the wrong, Ted and Betty left Vanities in October 1925 with Lou Warren and relaunched their Syncopated Toes revue, then retitled Fun in the Healy Manner. By January 1926, Shemp Howard had returned, and they successfully toured the country through the summer of 1926. Ted and Betty received another Broadway opportunity, this time from the Shubert brothers, who hired them for The Passing Show of 1926, with Ted bringing Shemp and Lou along. Passing only enjoyed a preview tour and did not open on Broadway, but the Shuberts and Healy retooled the show into the successful A Night in Spain, with Phil Baker joining the Healys as its stars. For Spain, Ted used four stooges in some scenes: Shemp, Lou Warren, brother-in-law Sam "Moody" Braun, and Dick Hakins. Arriving on Broadway in May 1927 after four months of successful previews, Hakins fell ill and was replaced by comedy/specialty dancer Bobby Pinkus. In November 1927, Spain began a national tour with four months at Chicago's Four Cohans Theatre. Larry Fine, who had been working as the lead performer and house master of ceremonies at Chicago's Rainbo Gardens nightclub and restaurant, was added to Healy's group of comics in late March 1928.

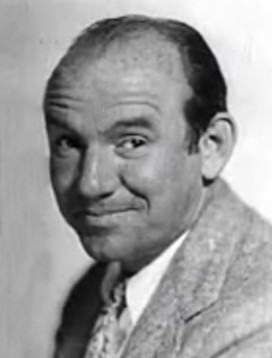
Healy in The Casino Murder Case (1935)

The Shuberts hired Ted to star in their new show, A Night in Venice. Moe Howard returned to show business and joined Ted at his home in Connecticut to develop some comedy bits for the revue, which began rehearsals in January 1929. Shemp Howard also returned, but Larry Fine was in Atlantic City with his wife, waiting for the birth of his daughter. Healy hired comedy xylophonist Fred Sanborn in Fine's place. Around mid-February, Fine joined the Venice cast.

During the run of A Night in Spain, Ted and Betty performed a song-and-dance stage act in nightclubs and other theaters after the evening show, but the Healys split in 1928. Ted came up with the idea to spotlight his stooges in a new act, with the emphasis on comedy and slapstick humor. Concurrent with their performances in Venice, Healy booked his troupe in additional shows as "Ted Healy and his Southern Gentlemen" and later as "Ted Healy and his Racketeers". A Night in Venice had a brief road tour after Broadway and closed in March 1930.

Fox Films hired Healy to costar in the film Soup to Nuts (filmed in July 1930), and Ted brought Moe, Shemp, Larry, and Fred Sanborn with him. In late August 1930, the Stooges and Healy parted ways after a dispute over a movie contract. Sanborn began a solo career, and the remaining trio began performing on their own, using such monikers as "the Three Lost Soles" and "Howard, Fine, and Howard", and often incorporated material from previous Healy shows. Healy attempted to sue the Stooges for using his material, but the copyright was held by the Shubert Theatre Corporation, for which the routines had been produced, and the Stooges had the Shuberts' permission to use it.

Healy hired replacement stooges—Eddie Moran (soon replaced by Richard "Dick" Hakins), Jack Wolf (father of sportscaster Warner Wolf), and Paul "Mousie" Garner—in early 1931. This group appeared with Healy in two Broadway plays, The Gang's All Here and Billy Rose's Crazy Quilt.

Moe, Larry, and Shemp rejoined Healy's act in late July 1932, but Shemp left on August 19 to pursue a solo career and was replaced by his younger brother, Curly Howard. The switch from Shemp to Curly happened very quickly, and on August 27, 1932, only eight days after Shemp departed, "Ted Healy with Howard, Fine and Howard" premiered Curly at the RKO Palace in Cleveland, Ohio. The new lineup's personal appearances headlined many of the prime nightclubs and movie palaces nationally for the next several months. In late spring 1933, Ted was contracted by MGM, and the act once more headed to Hollywood, this time to stay. Over the next year, Ted's comedy team appeared in several MGM shorts and even supported stars such as Clark Gable and Joan Crawford in theatrical films, including Dancing Lady, a blockbuster that featured Healy in an important supporting role, as well as Fred Astaire. On his own, Healy was given major roles in MGM features such as Bombshell with Jean Harlow and Operator 13 with Marion Davies and Gary Cooper. In March 1934, Fine and the Howards permanently and more-or-less amicably parted professional ways with Ted Healy and began working at Columbia Studios as The Three Stooges.

=== After the Stooges ===
Healy appeared in a succession of films for MGM from 1934 to 1937 and was also loaned to 20th Century-Fox and Warner Bros. for films by those companies, playing both dramatic and comedic roles. One of his films, Mad Holiday (1936), featured stooge Dick Hakins as his sidekick. In San Francisco (1936), a new lineup of "stooges" consisting of Jimmy Brewster, Red Pearson, and Sammy Glasser (Sammy Wolfe) filmed a scene with Healy, but it was omitted from the final release; a few production stills of them survive. Also, in the Technicolor short subject La Fiesta de Santa Barbara (1935), Jimmy Brewster briefly appears to "stooge" with Healy. During this period, Healy took to wearing a toupée in public. His last film, Hollywood Hotel (1937), was released a few days after he died.

== Personal life ==
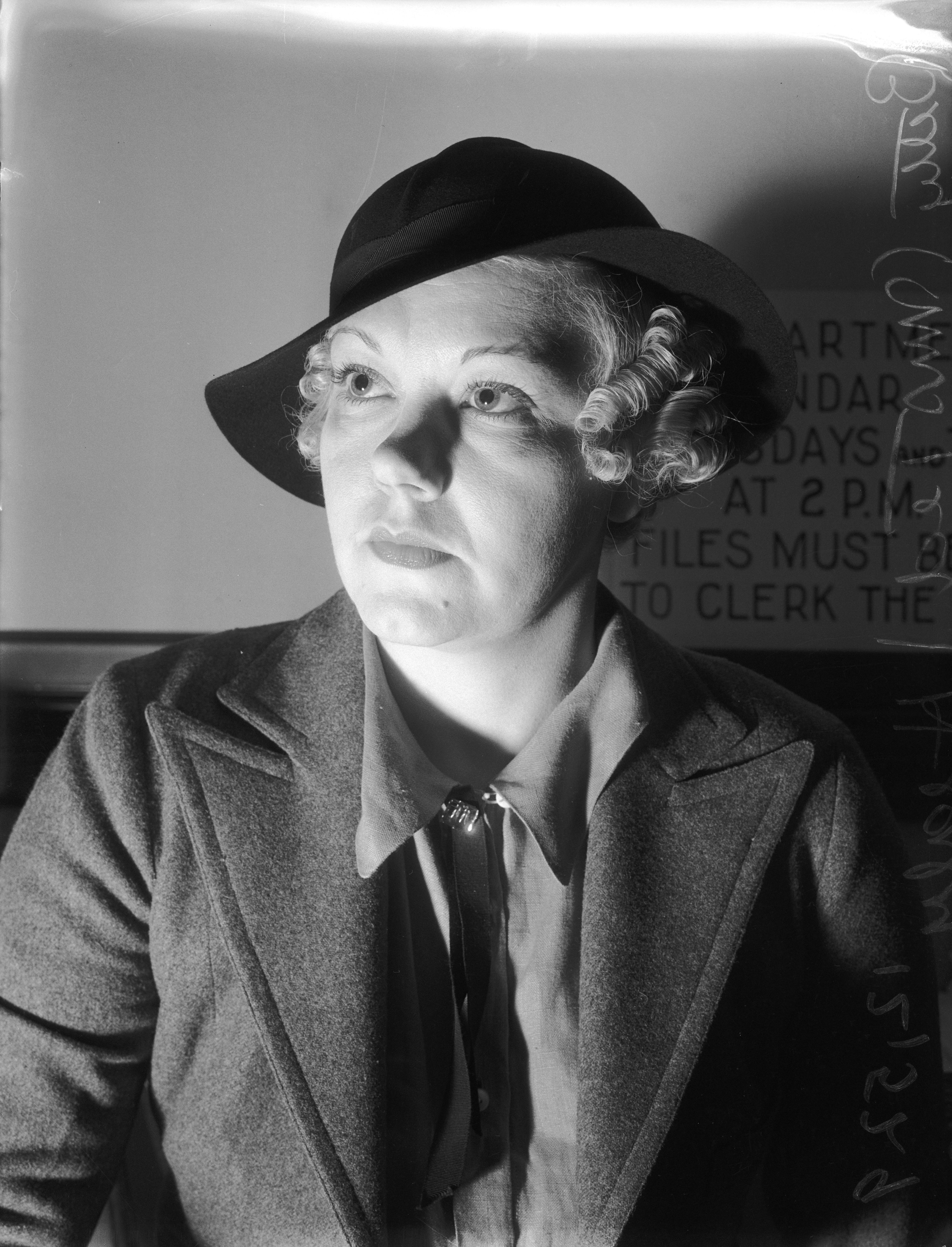
Healy's first wife Betty Brown

Healy's first wife was dancer and singer Betty Brown (born Elizabeth Braun), whom he married in 1922, one week after they met. The couple worked together in vaudeville, then divorced in 1932 after Brown sued socialite Mary Brown Warburton (the granddaughter of business tycoon John Wanamaker) for "alienation of her husband's affections".

Healy's second marriage was to UCLA student Betty Hickman. After introducing himself, Healy proposed immediately, and the couple became engaged the following day. They were married in Yuma, Arizona, on May 15, 1936, after a midnight elopement by plane. Hickman was granted a divorce on October 7, 1936, which was nullified after a reconciliation. Their son, John Jacob, was born on December 17, 1937, four days before Healy's death.

Healy campaigned for the re-election of President Herbert Hoover in 1932.

== Death ==
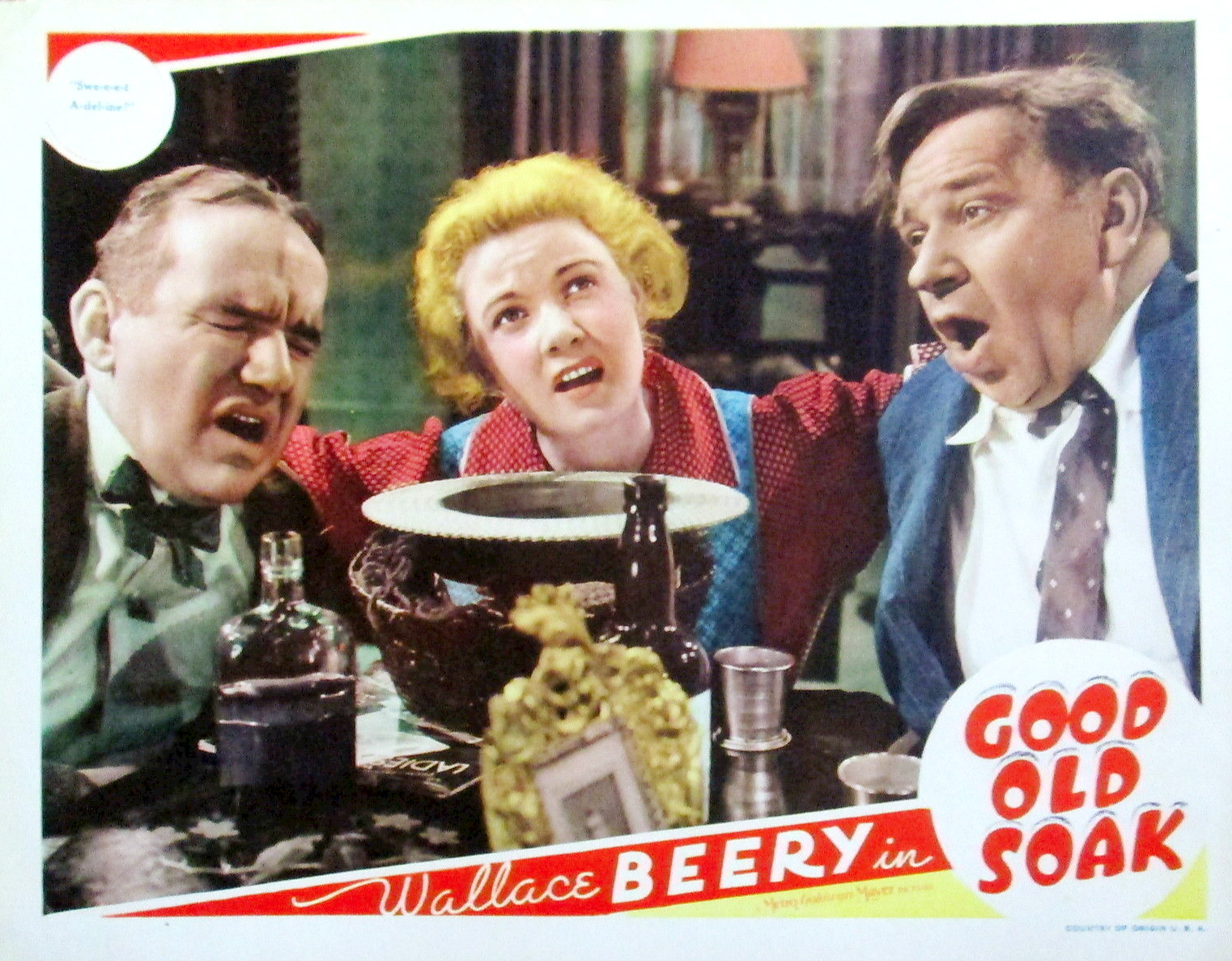
The Good Old Soak lobby card with Wallace Beery and Healy

Healy died on December 21, 1937, at the age of 41, after an evening of celebration at the Trocadero nightclub on the Sunset Strip in Los Angeles. He was reportedly celebrating the birth of his son, an event he had eagerly anticipated, according to Moe Howard. "He was nuts about kids", wrote Howard. "He used to visit our homes and envied the fact that we were all married and had children. Healy always loved kids and often gave Christmas parties for underprivileged youngsters and spent hundreds of dollars on toys."

The circumstances surrounding his death remain a matter of some controversy. An MGM spokesman initially announced the cause as a heart attack, but the presence of recent wounds—a cut over his right eye and a "discolored" left eye, combined with reports of an altercation at the Trocadero, gave rise to speculation that he died as a result of those injuries.

Healy's friend, writer Henry Taylor, told Moe Howard that the fight was preceded by an argument between Healy and three men whom he identified as "college fellows". The younger men allegedly knocked Healy to the ground and kicked him in the head, ribs, and abdomen. Wrestler Man Mountain Dean reported that he was standing in front of the Plaza Hotel in Hollywood at 2:30 am when Healy emerged, bleeding, from a taxi. He related an "incoherent story" of being attacked at the Trocadero, but could not identify his assailant. Dean contacted a physician, Sydney Weinberg, who treated Healy at the hotel. Another friend, Joe Frisco, then drove him to his home. Wyantt LaMont, Healy's personal physician, was summoned to the home the following morning when Healy began experiencing convulsions. Despite the efforts of LaMont and a cardiologist, John Ruddock, Healy died later that day. Because of the circumstances, LaMont refused to sign Healy's death certificate.

A later source alleged that the three assailants were not college boys, but rather actor Wallace Beery, Albert R. Broccoli, and Broccoli's cousin, agent/producer Pat DiCicco. While no documentation exists in contemporaneous news reports that either Beery or DiCicco was present, Broccoli admitted that he was indeed involved in a fist fight with Healy at the Trocadero. He later modified his story, stating that a heavily intoxicated Healy had picked a fight with him and the two had briefly scuffled and then shook hands and parted ways. In other reports, Broccoli admitted to pushing Healy, but not striking him.

Following an autopsy, the Los Angeles County coroner reported that Healy died of acute toxic nephritis secondary to acute and chronic alcoholism. Police closed their investigation, as nothing in the report indicated that his death was caused by physical assault.

Healy was a prodigious spender; despite a weekly salary of $1,700 (equivalent to $30,000 in 2025), he died in debt. He indulged in numerous personal luxuries and paid his assistant performers' salaries out of his own pocket. He was also financially generous to friends when they were out of work; for example, while unemployed, Frisco lived at an expensive hotel on Healy's tab. Betty was left responsible for a multitude of liabilities, including hospital bills related to the birth of her son and Healy's medical care. She remained hospitalized for some time after Healy died, leaving their house unattended; as a result, it was burglarized and looted of everything of value.

A trust fund was organized by friends and colleagues to provide financial support for Betty and her child. A fundraiser was also held, including a $10-per-plate dinner (equivalent to $224 in 2025) and an auction of the Hollywood Hotel's ledger with hundreds of famous signatures, but Betty later asserted that she never received any proceeds from the fundraiser.

Ted Healy is interred at Calvary Cemetery in Los Angeles, along with his mother and sister.

== Legacy ==
In the decades that followed, many comedy stars, including Milton Berle, Bob Hope, and Red Skelton, cited Healy as a mentor and significant influence on their careers. "Back in 1925, Ted Healy took me aside and gave me some wonderful advice," Berle told Walter Winchell, in 1955. "'Milton, always play to the public. Never mind playing to the theatrical crowd. Don't try to impress the trumpet player in the pit. Entertain the people and you'll get rich and famous.'" Alex Gard's caricature of Healy was the first of several hundred displayed at Sardi's restaurant in New York City's Theater District.

== Filmography ==
Year	Title	Role	Notes
1926	Wise Guys Prefer Brunettes	Napoleon Fizz	Short film
1930	Soup to Nuts	Ted "Teddy"	
1931	A Night in Venice		
1933	Nertsery Rhymes	Papa	Short film Story
1933	Stop, Sadie, Stop	Ted	Short film. A lost film
1933	Beer and Pretzels	Himself	Short film Writer
1933	Hello Pop!	Father	Short film Writer
1933	Stage Mother	Ralph Martin	
1933	Bombshell	Junior Burns	
1933	Plane Nuts	Himself	Short film Writer
1933	Meet the Baron	Head Janitor	
1933	Dancing Lady	Steve - Patch's Assistant	
1933	Myrt and Marge	Mullins	
1934	Fugitive Lovers	Hector Withington Jr.	
1934	Lazy River	William "Gabby" Stone	
1934	The Big Idea	Ted Healy, Scenario Company President	Short film Writer
1934	Hollywood Party	Reporter	Uncredited; last film with the Stooges
1934	Operator 13	Doctor Hitchcock	
1934	Paris Interlude	Jimmy	
1934	Death on the Diamond	'Truck' Hogan	
1934	The Band Plays On	Joe O'Brien	
1934	Forsaking All Others		(scenes deleted)
1935	The Winning Ticket	Eddie Dugan	
1935	The Casino Murder Case	Police Sergeant Ernest Heath	
1935	Reckless	Smiley	
1935	Murder in the Fleet	Gabby O'Neill	
1935	La Fiesta de Santa Barbara	Himself	Color short film
1935	Mad Love	Reagan	
1935	Here Comes the Band	Happy	
1935	It's in the Air	Clip McGurk	
1936	Speed	Clarence Maxmillian "Gadget" Haggerty	
1936	San Francisco	Mat	
1936	Sing, Baby, Sing	Al Craven	
1936	The Longest Night	Police Sergeant Magee	
1936	Mad Holiday	Mert Morgan	
1937	Man of the People	Joe The Glut	
1937	The Good Old Soak	Al Simmons	
1937	Varsity Show	William Williams	
1937	Hollywood Hotel	Fuzzy Boyle	
1938	Love Is a Headache	Jimmy Slattery	
1938	Of Human Hearts		Uncredited
