= Jack Cummings (director) =

Canadian-American film director (1905–89)

John Cummings (February 16, 1905 – April 28, 1989) was a Canadian-American film producer and director. He was best known for being a leading producer at Metro-Goldwyn-Mayer.

Cummings spent most of his career at Metro-Goldwyn-Mayer; his uncle, Louis B. Mayer initially hired him in the 1920s as an office boy and expected him to work his way up through the ranks.

Cummings became a staff producer at MGM in 1934, where he worked in the B-feature unit for two years. In 1936, he produced the extravagant Cole Porter musical Born to Dance, which established his reputation as a respected producer. Cummings remained at MGM even after his uncle was fired as head of the studio in 1951. Over the years, Cummings worked with stars including the Marx Brothers, Red Skelton, Esther Williams, and Fred Astaire, producing some of the era's best-known musicals, including 1953's Kiss Me Kate and Seven Brides for Seven Brothers in 1954, for which he received an Academy Award nomination. He left MGM to become an independent producer affiliated with Twentieth Century-Fox and produced the 1959 remake of The Blue Angel and the 1960 movie version of the Abe Burrows-Cole Porter Broadway musical Can-Can. In 1964, he returned to MGM one last time to produce the Elvis Presley musical Viva Las Vegas. Other credits included Easy to Wed, It Happened in Brooklyn, Three Little Words, The Last Time I Saw Paris, Interrupted Melody, and The Teahouse of the August Moon.

Dorothy Kingsley, the writer, later said:

Jack Cummings was an excellent producer, though he was L. B.'s [Louis B. Mayer's] nephew, which reacted against him. He let it react against him. Everyone else would go up and ask L. B. for something, but Jack never would because he was his nephew. He went through every department in the studio—cutting, music, sound, everything. He had a good story mind, too. He knew about everything and he was one of the best producers.

Cummings felt later in life his contribution to the movies had been downplayed because of his connection to Mayer. According to Charles Champlin "he was both rewarded by and rather cruelly punished by the relationship."

Dore Schary said Cummings was, with Arthur Freed and Joe Pasternak, one of the leading musical producers at MGM but "had talents that fell somewhere between Joe’s and Arthur’s. Jack had taken on the burden of proving he was more than L. B. Mayer’s nephew. The burden ofttimes made him sensitive and quick to resort to truculence. He was the realist.... Jack had a good comedic sense and of the three was the best in the field of nonmusical films.... Jack was lean, a good golfer, a tough and demanding man who dressed the best, always looked trim and showered."

Lester Cole wrote "He was very intelligent and really learned the craft, but he made his way up only slowly, painfully. He was resented and put down as "the boss's kid nephew," despite his skill."

== Biography ==
Jack Cummings was born in Saint John, New Brunswick on February 16, 1905 the son of Louis Komiensky and Ida Mayer, sister of Louis B. Mayer. He had two sisters, Ruth (married to film director Roy Rowland) and Mitzi (married to film producer Sol Baer Fielding), as well as a younger half brother Leonard 'Sonny' Cummings.

Cummings went to work at the MGM prop department at age seventeen. He worked as an office boy, script clerk, assistant director and short subject director for MGM studios. His short credits include The General (1929) and Gentlemen of Polish (1934).

=== Producer ===
Cummings’ first film as producer was The Winning Ticket (1935) with Leo Carrillo. He worked uncredited on Tarzan Escapes (1936), taking over from producer Phil Goldston. Then he had a huge hit with Born to Dance (1936), a musical starring Eleanor Powell and James Stewart. Cummings followed this with another musical with Powell, Broadway Melody of 1938 (1938), best remembered for featuring Judy Garland singing "You Made Me Love You (I Didn't Want to Do It)". He also made the drama Yellow Jack (1938), starring Robert Montgomery

Cummings made the Judy Garland film Listen, Darling (1938), which was only a minor success, followed by the Eleanor Powell musicals Honolulu (1939) and Broadway Melody of 1940 (1940), the latter co starring Fred Astaire. Cummings made Two Girls on Broadway (1940) a musical with Lana Turner and George Murphy, produced at short notice with available talent in order to fill a gap.

Cummings made two films with Powell and Red Skelton, Ship Ahoy (1942) and I Dood It (1943), both very popular, plus the comedy Go West (1940) with the Marx Brothers.

After the musical Broadway Rhythm (1944) with George Murphy, Cummings made Bathing Beauty (1944), the starring debut of Esther Williams, alongside Skelton. The movie was massively popular and Cummings produced several more Williams films: Easy to Wed (1946) with Van Johnson, Fiesta (1947) with Ricardo Montalban, Neptune's Daughter (1949) with Skelton and Montalban, Texas Carnival (1951) with Skelton and Howard Keel.

Other musicals Cummings made around this time included It Happened in Brooklyn (1947) with Frank Sinatra; Three Little Words (1950) a biopic with Skelton Fred Astaire, that introduced Debbie Reynolds; Two Weeks with Love (1950), with Powell, Montalban and Renolds; and Lovely to Look At (1952), with Skelton, Keel and Kathryn Grayson. The latter film lost money due to its high cost. In September 1950 Cummings announced he would start up a production company with Roy Rowland but this did not eventuate.

Cummings' non musicals included The Romance of Rosy Ridge (1947) with Van Johnson and Janet Leigh, who made her film debut; it was written by Lester Cole who was a friend of Cummings, and lost money at the box office. There was also The Stratton Story (1949) a biopic with James Stewart and June Allyson, which was a huge hit; Excuse My Dust (1951), a comedy with Red Skelton; and Sombrero (1953), with Montalban. Like Fiesta, Sombrero was shot in Mexico, where Cummings enjoyed spending time. Cummings and Cole planned to make a biopic of Zapata but the project was cancelled.

Cummings produced Kiss Me Kate (1953), based on the Cole Porter musical, starring Keel and Grayson, and featuring a young Bob Fosse. Then he made two films directed by Stanley Donen, Give a Girl a Break (1953), starring Marge and Gower Champion, and Seven Brides for Seven Brothers (1954), with Keel and Jane Powell. The former flopped but the latter was a huge box office hit and would be the film of which Cummings was the most proud. Howard Keel wrote in his memoirs "Donen did a good job directing Seven Brides, but the real hero and brains behind it was Jack Cummings." Donen later said making the film was "a nightmare because it was a terrible struggle from the beginning of the picture until the end" in part because he clashed with Cummings.

Cummings made some popular non-musicals: The Last Time I Saw Paris (1954), a drama with Elizabeth Taylor and Van Johnson; Many Rivers to Cross (1955) a Western with Robert Taylor and Eleanor Parker, co starring Russ Tamblyn and Jeff Richards from Seven Brides; and Interrupted Melody (1955), a biopic of Marjorie Lawrence starring Parker and Glenn Ford. Cummings had spent three years on Interrupted Melody. These films were all hugely popular. Paris and Melody featured early performances from Roger Moore.

Cummings' last film for MGM was the popular comedy The Teahouse of the August Moon (1956) with Ford and Marlon Brando.

=== Post MGM career ===
In March 1955 Cummings announced he would leave MGM once the 18 months left on his contract ran out.

In June 1957 Cummings formed a company with Louis B Mayer to make two films. The Dragon Tree and Paint Your Wagon. However Mayer died before either could be made. In June 1958 Cummings signed a deal with 20th Century Fox. His films for Fox included The Blue Angel (1959), an unsuccessful remake of the 1930 film, starring May Britt and Curt Jurgens; Can-Can (1960), an adaptation of the Broadway hit, with Frank Sinatra; Bachelor Flat (1961), a Frank Tashlin comedy with Terry Thomas; and The Second Time Around (1961), a comedy with Debbie Reynolds. Of these the most successful was Can Can which Cummings said "wasn't a great picture" but "made a lot of money." Plans for him to produce Birdman of Alcatraz ended due to lack of government co operation. Other unmade films at Fox included a remake of Stage Door, plus The Will Adams Story and Paint Your Wagon.

In July 1961 Cummings returned to MGM signing a deal with head of production Sol Siegel to make eight features over four years through his own company. His projects included a sequel to Seven Brides, The Widow to be made in Mexico, The Will Adams Story and Dragon Tree. While at MGM however he made only one film Viva Las Vegas (1964) with Elvis Presley.

Cummings' last credit was Pipe Dreams (1976) with Gladys Knight.

=== Personal life ===
Cummings was married to Margery Straus, with whom he had two daughters, Julie Ann and Cathy. He divorced Margery in 1946 after fifteen years of marriage.

In 1947, Cummings married Betty Kern, daughter of composer Jerome Kern. They had daughters Linda Kern (b. 1952) and Carla Luisa and Cummings adopted Betty's son from her previous marriage to Artie Shaw, Steven. Cummings and Kern were later divorced. She married Marvin Lee Miller in 1964.

Cummings died at age 84 on April 28, 1989 at Cedars Sinai Medical Centre.

== Partial filmography ==
- The Winning Ticket (1935)
- Tarzan Escapes (1936)
- Born to Dance (1936)
- Broadway Melody of 1938 (1937)
- Yellow Jack (1938)
- Listen, Darling (1938)
- Honolulu (1939)
- Broadway Melody of 1940 (1940)
- Two Girls on Broadway (1940)
- Go West (1940)
- Ship Ahoy (1942)
- I Dood It (1943)
- Broadway Rhythm (1944)
- Bathing Beauty (1944)
- Easy to Wed (1946)
- It Happened in Brooklyn (1947)
- Fiesta (1947)
- The Romance of Rosy Ridge (1947)
- The Stratton Story (1949)
- Neptune's Daughter (1949)
- Two Weeks with Love (1950)
- Three Little Words (1950)
- Excuse My Dust (1951)
- Texas Carnival (1951)
- Lovely to Look At (1952)
- Sombrero (1953)
- Give a Girl a Break (1953)
- Kiss Me Kate (1953)
- Seven Brides for Seven Brothers (1954)
- The Last Time I Saw Paris (1954)
- Many Rivers to Cross (1955)
- Interrupted Melody (1955)
- The Teahouse of the August Moon (1956)
- The Blue Angel (1959)
- Can-Can (1960)
- The Second Time Around (1961)
- Bachelor Flat (1962)
- Viva La Vegas (1964)
- Pipe Dreams (1976)

== Awards and nominations ==
27th Academy Awards, held March 1955. Nominated for Best Picture (Seven Brides for Seven Brothers). Lost to Sam Spiegel for On the Waterfront.
