= The Great Morgan =

1945 film by Nat Perrin

- Directed by: Nat Perrin
- Written by: Nat Perrin
- Produced by: Jerry Bresler
- Starring: Frank Morgan
- Cinematography: Charles Salerno, Jr.
- Edited by: Tom Biggart
- Music by: Max Terr
- Distributed by: Metro-Goldwyn-Mayer
- Release date: 1945
- Running time: 57 minutes
- Country: United States
- Language: English

The Great Morgan is a 1945 American musical-comedy film released by Metro-Goldwyn-Mayer. The film is considered one of the more unusual in the MGM canon in that it is a compilation film built around a slight plot line, with a running time of less than 60 minutes.

The film was produced for overseas (i.e. non-United States) markets and features Frank Morgan (best remembered today as the Wizard in MGM's The Wizard of Oz) appearing as himself. The premise of the film is that a bumbling Morgan is given a chance to produce a movie, but ends up botching it and accidentally editing several unrelated comedic and musical short subjects together with his own film, "The Burning Secret."

Three segments had been cut from earlier musicals: "Got a Pair of New Shoes" (by Nacio Herb Brown and Arthur Freed), performed by dancer Eleanor Powell, cut from her 1939 film Honolulu (some sources state the scene comes from Broadway Melody of 1938, but that is incorrect); "Thank You Columbus" (by Burton Lane and Yip Harburg), performed by The King Sisters, cut from Meet the People; and "I Fell in Love with the Leader of the Band" (by Jule Styne and Herb Magidson), sung by Virginia O'Brien backed by Tommy Dorsey and orchestra, cut from Ship Ahoy. A Pete Smith short film entitled Badminton is also shown, possibly made exclusively for the film.

Another three segments came from the MGM short "Musical Masterpieces": two songs sung by Carlos Ramirez, and the instrumental "Flight of the Bumblebee".

Among the non-musical segments of the film is a look at the history of the automobile in suburban America and a profile of a champion badminton player. There are also cameos by MGM supervisor of sound Douglas Shearer, art director Cedric Gibbons and costume designer Irene.

For many decades The Great Morgan was believed to be a lost film. A print was found in 1980, and another was discovered a few years later. The film was subsequently released to the American home video market and is occasionally shown on Turner Classic Movies.

== Cast ==
- Frank Morgan as Frank Morgan
- Leon Ames as K.F. Studio Exec
- Carlos Ramírez as Singer in 'Musical Masterpieces' (archive footage)
- Lucille Norman as Singer in 'Musical Masterpieces' (archive footage)
- Eleanor Powell as Film Character (archive footage)
- Virginia O'Brien as Film Character (archive footage)
- The King Sisters as The King Sisters (archive footage)
- Jacqueline White as Mother in 'Our Old Car' (archive footage)
