= Spin Little Pinball =

"Spin Little Pinball" is a novelty musical number from the 1944 musical film Sensations of 1945 featuring Eleanor Powell in her last major film role prior to her retirement. In the number, Powell tap dances as if she were a life-size pinball, being bounced around inside a pinball machine. Receiving mixed reviews, the dance concept piece was a throwback to the Busby Berkeley-style of choreography of the 1930s. The song was written by popular songwriters Al Sherman and Harry Tobias.

== Sources ==
- Sherman, Robert B. Walt's Time: from before to beyond, Santa Clarita: Camphor Tree Publishers, 1998.
- IMDB.com reference
- YouTube reference Video on YouTube
