= Broadway Rhythm =

1944 film by Roy Del Ruth

- Theatrical release poster
- Directed by: Roy Del Ruth
- Written by: Dorothy Kingsley; Harry Clork
- Story by: Jack McGowan
- Based on: Very Warm for May; 1939 musical by Jerome Kern; Oscar Hammerstein, 2nd.
- Produced by: Jack Cummings
- Starring: George Murphy; Ginny Simms
- Cinematography: Leonard Smith, A.S.C.
- Edited by: Albert Akst
- Music by: Johnny Green
- Production company: Metro-Goldwyn-Mayer
- Release date: April 13, 1944
- Running time: 115 minutes
- Country: United States
- Language: English

Broadway Rhythm is a 1944 American Technicolor musical film directed by Roy Del Ruth. The film stars George Murphy and Ginny Simms, with Charles Winniger, Gloria DeHaven, Nancy Walker, Ben Blue, Lena Horne, Eddie Anderson, Hazel Scott, Kenny Bowers, The Ross Sisters and Dean Murphy. The film prominently features Tommy Dorsey and his Orchestra. It was produced and released by Metro-Goldwyn-Mayer (MGM).

It was originally announced as Broadway Melody of 1944 to follow MGM's Broadway Melody films of 1929, 1936, 1938, and 1940. It was originally slated to star Eleanor Powell and Gene Kelly, but Louis B. Mayer and MGM loaned Kelly out to Columbia to play opposite Rita Hayworth in Cover Girl (1944). The film instead starred Murphy, who had appeared in Broadway Melody of 1938 and Broadway Melody of 1940. Mayer then replaced Powell with Simms.

== Plot ==
Murphy plays a successful Broadway musical comedy producer named Johnnie Demming. He needs a star for his new show. He's smitten with the glamorous film star, Helen Hoyt (Simms), and offers the part to her, but she turns him down because she wants to be sure she's in a hit. Johnnie's father (Winninger), retired from vaudeville, wants to do his own show. He gets his daughter, Patsy (DeHaven) and also Helen. Johnnie feels betrayed by his father.

== Cast ==
- George Murphy as Jonnie Demming
- Ginny Simms as Helen Hoyt
- Charles Winninger as Sam Demming
- Gloria DeHaven as Patsy Demming
- Nancy Walker as Trixie Simpson
- Ben Blue as Felix Gross
- Lena Horne as Fernway de la Fer
- Eddie "Rochester" Anderson as Eddie
- Tommy Dorsey and his Orchestra
- Hazel Scott as herself
- Kenny Bowers as Ray Kent
- The Ross Sisters as Maggie, Aggie and Elmira
- Dean Murphy as Hired Man
- Louis Mason as Farmer
- Bunny Waters as Bunnie
- Walter B. Long as Doug Kelly
- Sara Haden as Miss Wynn

== Soundtrack ==
The film is very loosely based on the Broadway musical Very Warm for May (1939). However, all the songs from the musical except for "All the Things You Are" were left out of the film. Some of the songs from the movie are by the writers of the original musical, Jerome Kern and Oscar Hammerstein II:

- All the Things You Are
- That Lucky Fellow
- In Other Words, Seventeen
- All in Fun

=== Additional songs ===
- "Somebody Loves Me" by George Gershwin, Ira Gershwin
- "Who's Who", "Solid Potato Salad", "Irresistible You", "Milkman Keep Those Bottles Quiet", "I Love Corny Music" by Raye and DePaul
- "What Do You Think I Am", "Brazilian Boogie" by Martin and Blane
- "Pretty Baby" by Tony Jackson, Egbert Van Alstyne, Gus Kahn
- "Amor" by Gabriel Ruiz, Ricardo Lopez Mendez

== See also ==
- List of American films of 1944
