= The Broadway Melody =

1929 film

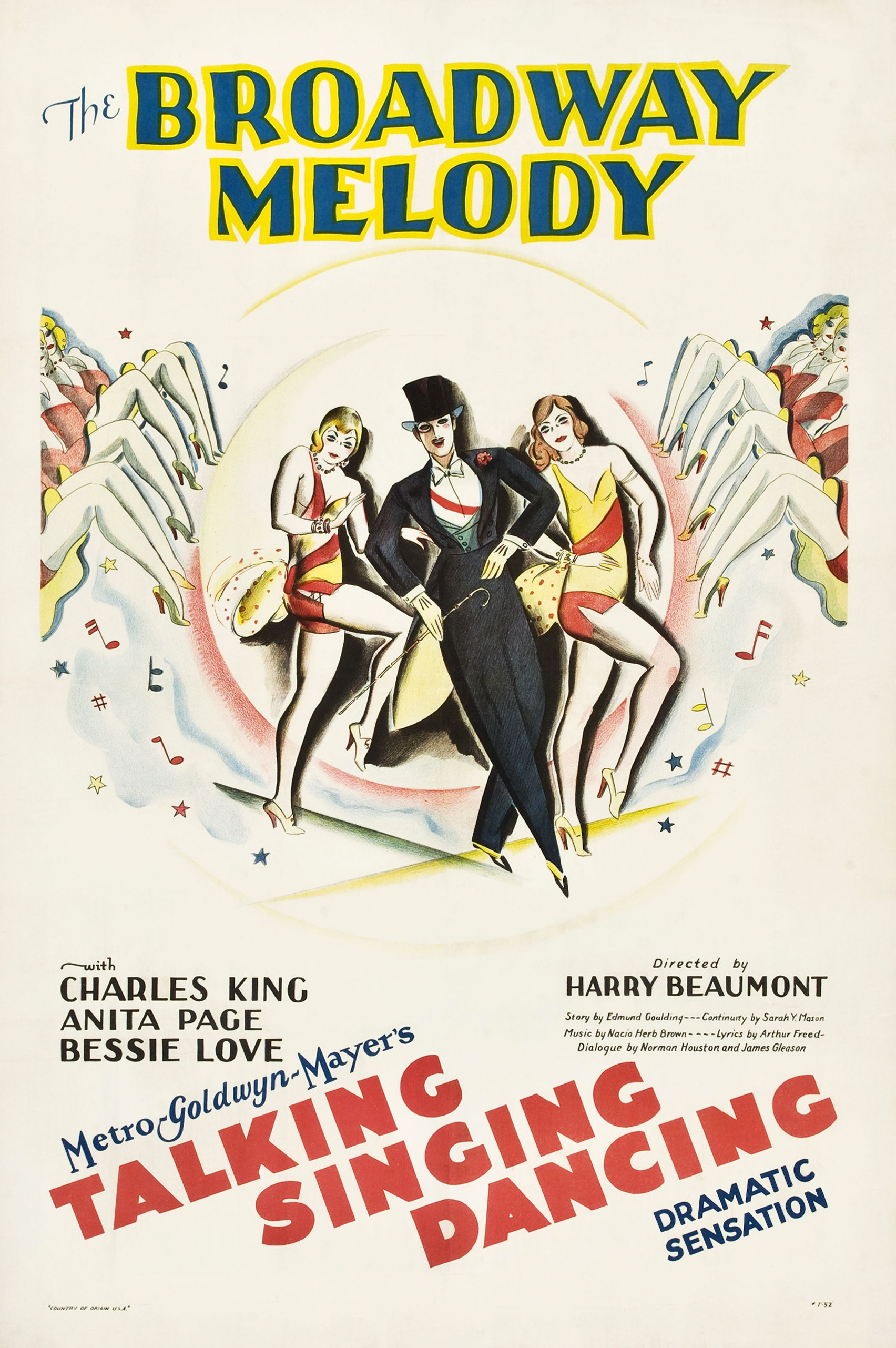
- Theatrical release poster
- Directed by: Harry Beaumont
- Written by: Sarah Y. Mason (continuity); Norman Houston (dialogue); James Gleason (dialogue); uncredited: Earl Baldwin (titles)
- Story by: Edmund Goulding
- Produced by: Irving Thalberg; Lawrence Weingarten
- Starring: Charles King; Anita Page; Bessie Love
- Cinematography: John Arnold
- Edited by: Sam S. Zimbalist; uncredited: William LeVanway (silent version)
- Music by: (see article)
- Color process: Black and White (with a Technicolor sequence)
- Distributed by: Metro-Goldwyn-Mayer
- Release dates: February 1, 1929 (Grauman's Chinese Theatre); February 8, 1929 (NYC); June 12, 1929 (U.S.)
- Running time: 101 minutes
- Country: United States
- Language: English
- Budget: $379,000
- Box office: $4.4 million

The Broadway Melody, also known as The Broadway Melody of 1929, is a 1929 American pre-Code musical film and the first sound film to win an Academy Award for Best Picture. It was one of the early musicals to feature a Technicolor sequence, which sparked the trend of color being used in a flurry of musicals that would hit the screens in 1929–1930.

The Broadway Melody was written by Norman Houston and James Gleason from a story by Edmund Goulding and directed by Harry Beaumont. Original music was written by Arthur Freed and Nacio Herb Brown, including the popular hit "You Were Meant for Me". The George M. Cohan classic "Give My Regards to Broadway" is used under the opening establishing shots of New York City, its film debut. Bessie Love was nominated for an Academy Award for Best Actress for her performance. Today, the Technicolor sequence survives only in black and white. The film was the first musical released by Metro-Goldwyn-Mayer and was Hollywood's first all-talking musical.

Having been published in 1929, it entered the public domain on January 1, 2025.

== Plot ==
The Broadway Melody

Eddie Kearns sings "The Broadway Melody" and tells some chorus girls that he has brought the Mahoney Sisters vaudeville act to New York to perform it with him in the latest revue being produced by Francis Zanfield. Harriet "Hank" Mahoney and her sister Queenie Mahoney are awaiting Eddie's arrival at their apartment. Hank, the older sister, prides herself on her business sense and talent, while Queenie is lauded for her beauty. Hank is confident they will make it big, while Queenie is less eager to put everything on the line to become a star. Hank declines the offer of their Uncle Jed to join a 30-week traveling show but consents to think it over.

Eddie, who is engaged to Hank, arrives and sees Queenie for the first time since she was a young girl and is instantly taken with her. He tells them to come to a rehearsal for Zanfield's revue to present their act. Flo, a dancer in Zanfield's company, sabotages their performance by placing a bag in the piano, which causes a fight with Hank. Zanfield isn't interested in it but says he might have a use for Queenie, who begs him to give Hank a part as well, saying both will work for one wage. She also convinces him to pretend that Hank's business skills won him over. Eddie witnesses this exchange and becomes even more enamored of Queenie for her devotion to her sister. During a dress rehearsal for the revue, Zanfield says the pacing is too slow for "The Broadway Melody" and cuts Hank and Queenie from the number.

Meanwhile, another woman is injured after falling off a set prop, and Queenie is selected to replace her. Nearly everyone is enamored with Queenie, particularly notorious playboy Jacques "Jock" Warriner. While Jock begins to woo Queenie, Hank is upset that Queenie is building her success on her looks rather than her talent.

Over the following weeks, Queenie spends a lot of time with Jock, of which Hank and Eddie fervently disapprove. They forbid her to see him, which results in Queenie pushing them away and deteriorating the relationship between the sisters. Queenie is only with Jock to fight her growing feelings for Eddie, but Hank thinks she's setting herself up to be hurt. Eventually, Eddie and Queenie confess their love for each other, but Queenie, unwilling to break her sister's heart, runs off to Jock once again.

After witnessing Queenie's fierce outburst toward Eddie and his devastated reaction to it, Hank finally realizes that they are in love. She berates Eddie for letting Queenie run away and tells him to go after her. Hank claims to have never loved him and that she'd only been using him to advance her career. After he leaves, Hank breaks down and alternates between sobs and hysterical laughter. She composes herself enough to call Uncle Jed to accept the job with the 30-week show.

There's a raucous party at the apartment Jock had recently purchased for Queenie, but he insists they spend time alone. When she resists his advances, he says it's the least she could do after all he's done for her. He begins to get physical, but Eddie bursts in and attempts to fight Jock, who knocks him through the door with one punch. Queenie runs to Eddie and leaves Jock and the party behind.

Sometime later, Hank and Uncle Jed await the return of Queenie and Eddie from their honeymoon. The relationship between the sisters is on the mend, but there is obvious discomfort between Hank and Eddie. Queenie announces she's through with show business and will settle in their new house on Long Island. She insists that Hank live with them when her job is over. After Hank leaves with her new partner and Uncle Jed, Queenie laments that she couldn't help her sister find the happiness she deserves. Ironically, Hank's new partner is Flo, the blonde who tried to sabotage the act when the sisters first arrived in New York. The final scene shows Hank on her way to the train station. She promises her new partner that they'll be back on Broadway within six months.

== Cast ==
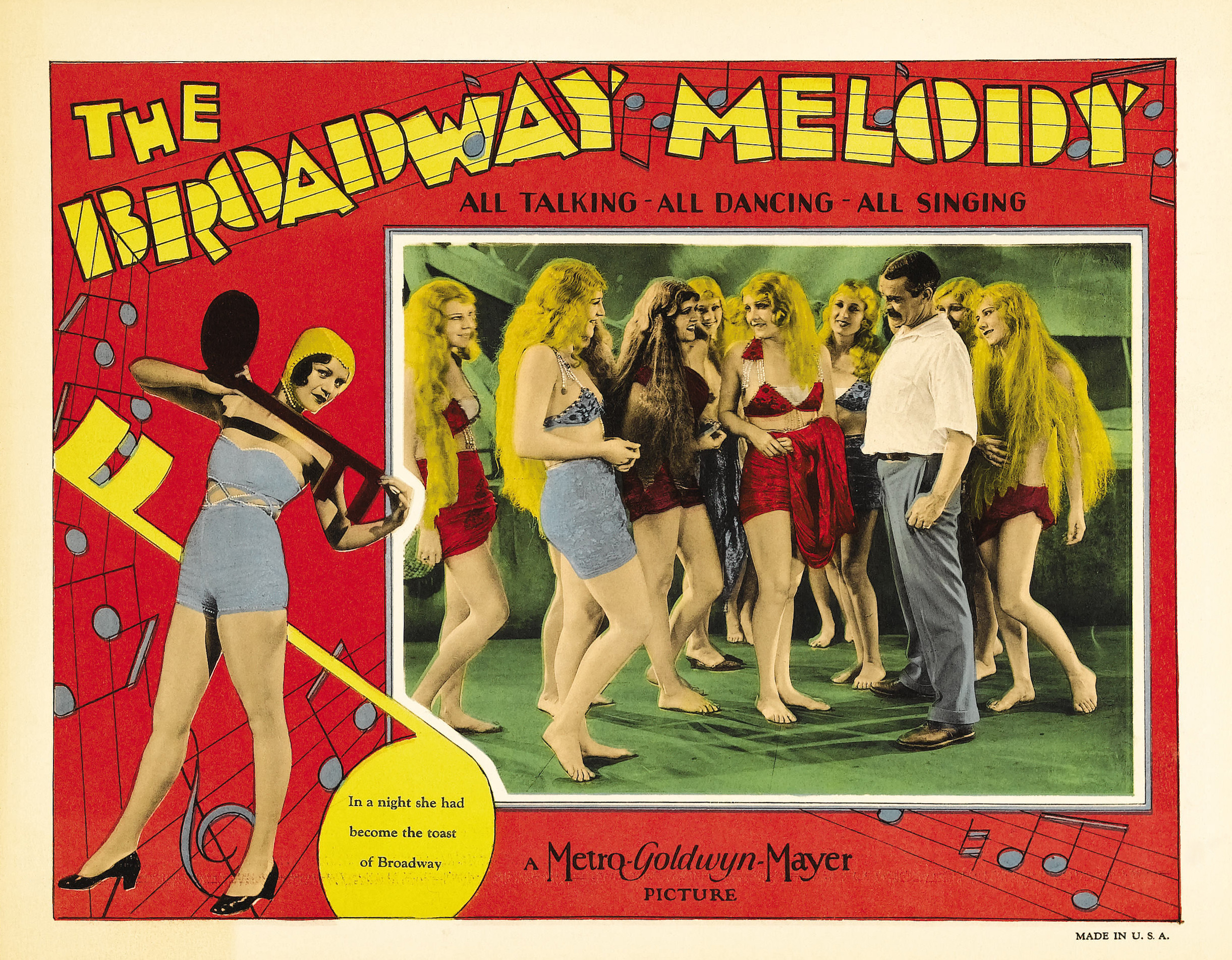
Lobby card

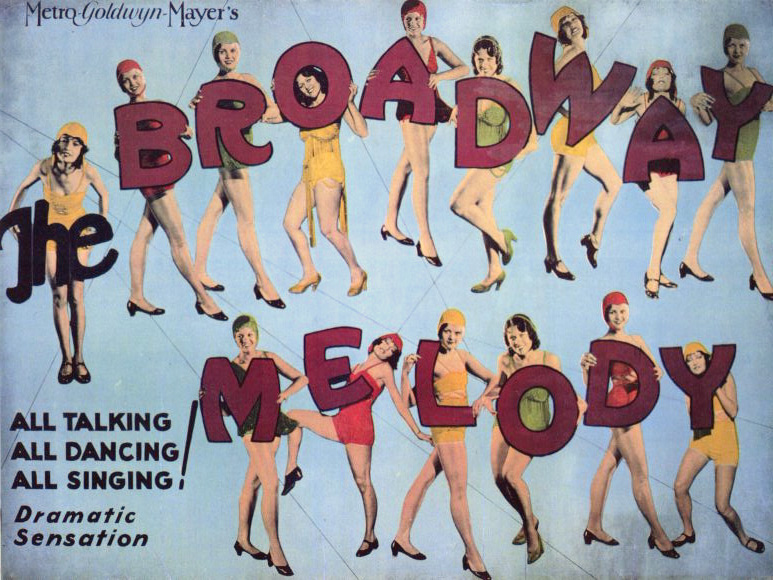
Poster

- Anita Page as Queenie Mahoney
- Bessie Love as Harriet "Hank" Mahoney
- Charles King as Eddie Kearns
- Jed Prouty as Uncle Jed
- Kenneth Thomson as Jacques Warriner
- Edward Dillon as stage manager
- Mary Doran as Flo, the blonde
- Eddie Kane as Zanfield
- J. Emmett Beck as Babe Hatrick
- Marshall Ruth as Stew
- Drew Demarest as Turpe
- James Gleason as music publisher (uncredited)

== Musical numbers ==
Music by Nacio Herb Brown, lyrics by Arthur Freed, except as noted.

- "Broadway Melody"
- "Love Boat"
- "You Were Meant for Me"
- "Wedding of the Painted Doll"
- "Boy Friend"
- "Truthful Parson Brown"—music and lyrics by Willard Robison
- "Lovely Lady"

== Production ==
Because the movie was one of the early sound features and one of the early sound musicals, the production learned to record sound properly through trial and error. After the rushes were viewed, the sets were modified to enhance recording quality, and scenes were re-shot, resulting in extended days for the actors and a prolonged overall shooting schedule. It took over three hours to film Bessie Love's brief ukulele-playing scene. For earlier takes, a full orchestra was off-camera, but for later takes, the actors sang and danced to prerecorded music. A silent version of the film was produced, as there were still many motion picture theaters without sound equipment at the time.

John Arnold shot with spherical lenses on 35mm black-and-white film, with one sequence in color. The film was presented in an aspect ratio of 1.37:1 (sound on disc version) and 1.20:1 (sound on film version).

The film featured a musical sequence for "The Wedding of the Painted Doll," presented in early two-color Technicolor (red and green filters). Color quickly became associated with the musical genre, and numerous features were released in 1929 and 1930 that either featured color sequences or were filmed entirely in color, like On with the Show (1929), Gold Diggers of Broadway (1929), Sally (1929), The Life of the Party (1930), and others. The complete color footage is not extant, although a brief film fragment still survives.

A 16-second 35mm Technicolor film fragment from the very beginning of the "Wedding of the Painted Doll" did manage to escape total degradation. This surviving physical footage is currently preserved at the George Eastman Museum (formerly George Eastman House) in Rochester, New York. The 24-foot fragment was discovered in 2012 at Haghefilm Conservation B.V. in Amsterdam. The footage was part of a compilation reel of two-color Technicolor print tests and snippets originally sourced from Technicolor's former laboratory in Boston.

== Reception and legacy ==
=== Contemporary ===
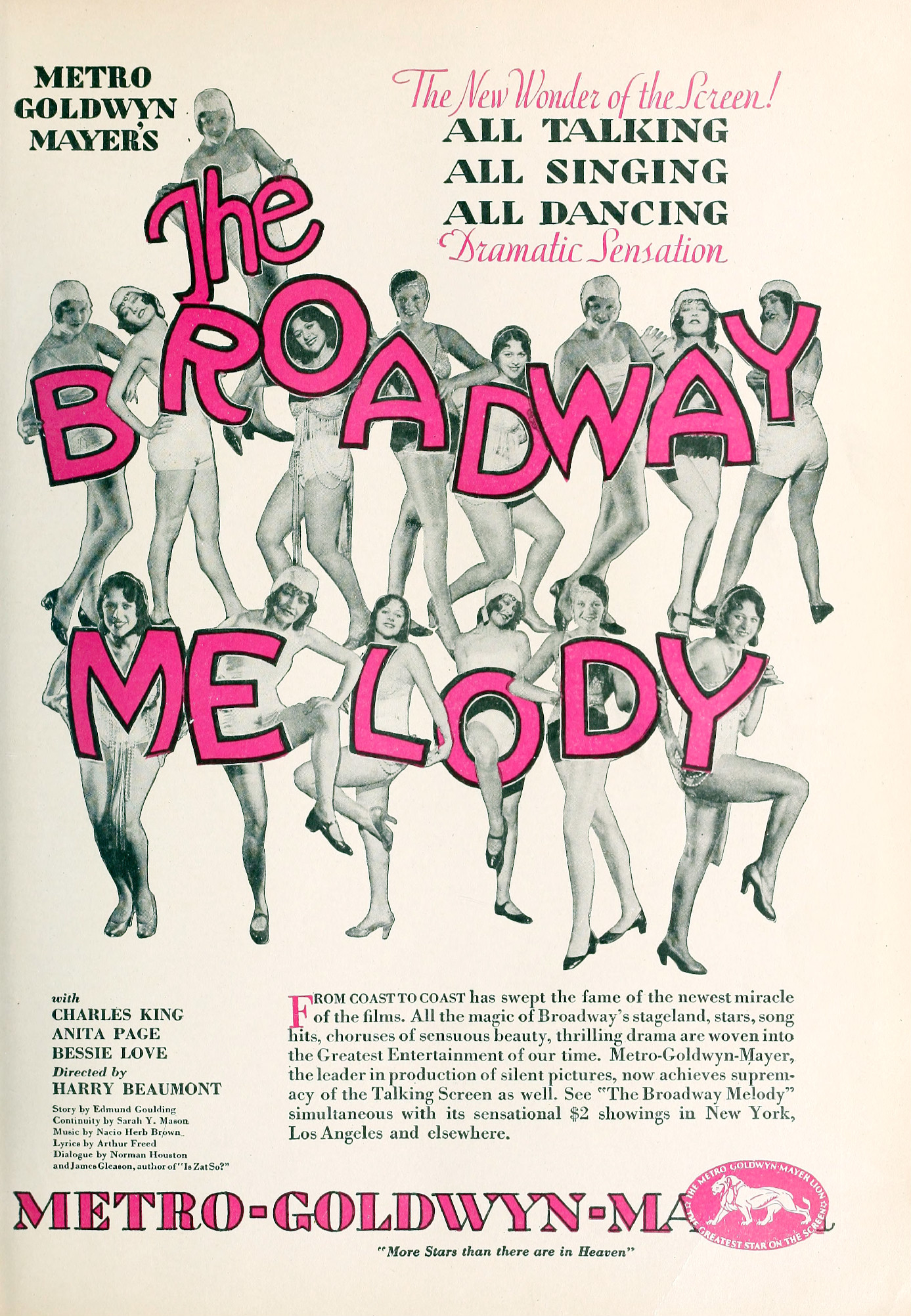
Ad for the film as seen in most magazine publications of the time.

The Broadway Melody was a substantial success and made a profit of $1.6 million for MGM. It was the top grossing picture of 1929 and won the Academy Award for Best Picture.

Contemporary reviews from critics were generally positive. Variety wrote that it "has everything a silent picture should have outside of its dialog. A basic story with some sense to it, action, excellent direction, laughs, a tear, a couple of great performances and plenty of sex." "Has everything", agreed Film Daily. "Sure-fire moneymaker that will drag 'em in everywhere."

"This picture is great. It will revolutionize the talkies", wrote Edwin Schallert for Motion Picture News. "The direction is an amazing indication of what can be done in the new medium."

Mordaunt Hall of The New York Times wrote a mixed review, calling it "rather cleverly directed" but "somewhat obvious", with sentiment "served out too generously in most of the sequences." Hall called King's performance "vigorous", but of Page, he wrote, "Her acting, especially her voice, does not enhance her personality. Notwithstanding, it must be admitted that there are girls who talk as they are made to for the screen. Miss Page, however, fails to give one an impression of spontaneity, for she recites rather than speaks her lines."

John Mosher of The New Yorker wrote, "The stage background allows opportunity for one or two musical interpolations, and no one is more glad than we that the talkies charmingly succeed in a very pleasant ballet. Because of that, we shall try to forget the dialogue of the play, and that James Gleason ever wanted to take any credit for it."

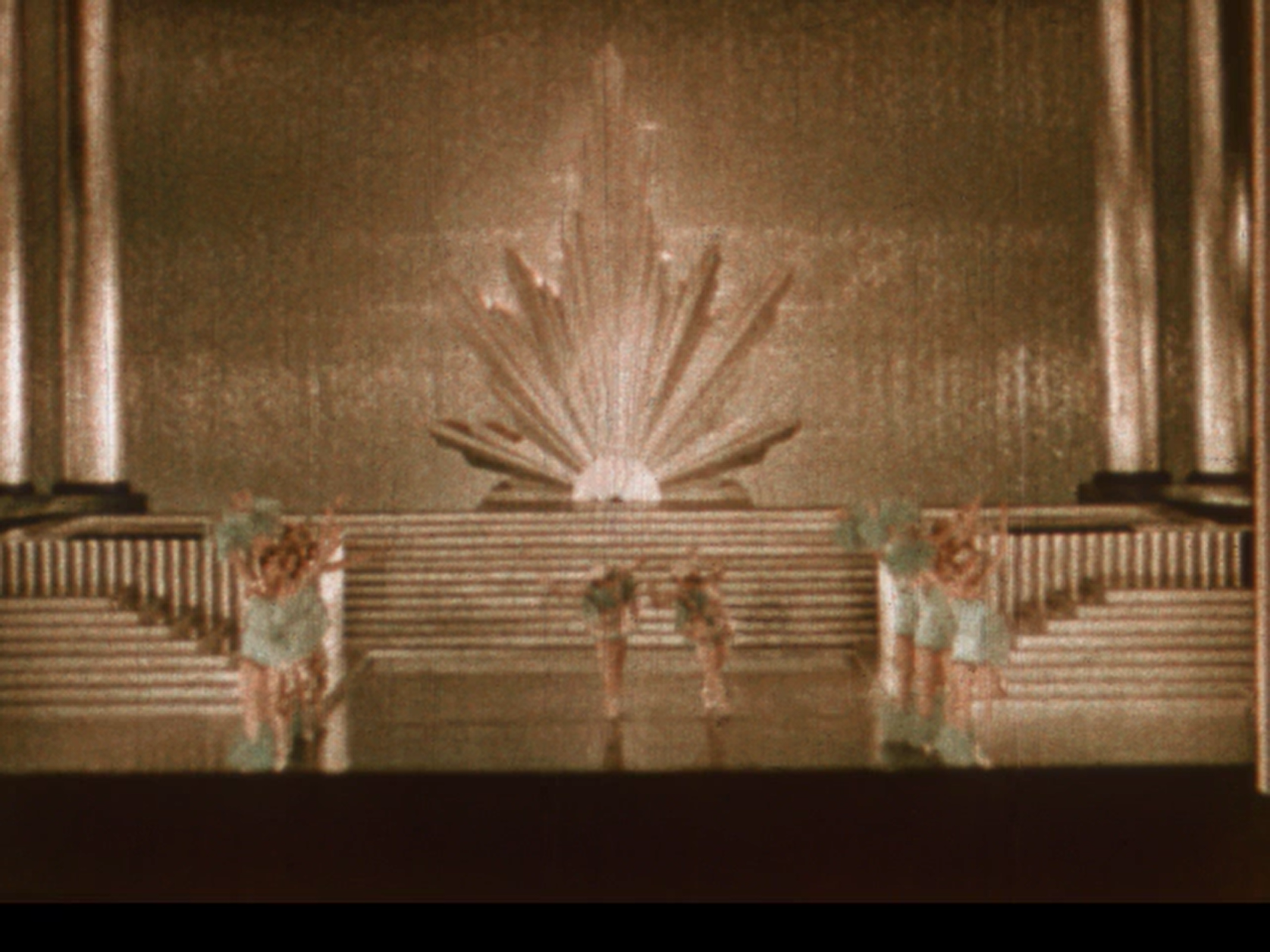
Extant color frame of the lost color sequence 'Wedding of the Painted Doll'

=== Accolades ===
The film was nominated for three Academy Awards at the 1930 ceremony: Best Actress (Bessie Love), Best Director (Harry Beaumont), and Outstanding Picture. No nominations were announced before the 1930 ceremonies. Love and Beaumont are presumed to have been under consideration, and they are listed as such by the Academy of Motion Picture Arts and Sciences.

Award	Category	Nominee(s)	Result	Ref.
Academy Awards	Outstanding Picture	Metro-Goldwyn-Mayer	Won	
Academy Awards	Best Director	Harry Beaumont	Nominated	
Academy Awards	Best Actress	Bessie Love	Nominated	

=== Retrospective ===
Historically, The Broadway Melody is often considered the first complete example of a Hollywood musical. Contemporary critics now view the movie as clichéd and overly melodramatic, despite its innovative status for its time and its contributions to the concept and structure of musical films. It currently holds a rating of 42% at Rotten Tomatoes, based on 31 reviews, with a weighted average of 5.50/10. The site's consensus is that the film "is interesting as an example of an early Hollywood musical, but otherwise, it's essentially bereft of appeal for modern audiences".

Assessing the film in 2009, James Berardinelli wrote, "The Broadway Melody has not stood the test of time in ways that many of its more artistic contemporaries have. Some of its deficiencies can be attributed to ways in which the genre has been re-shaped and improved over the years, but some are the result of the studio's validated belief that viewers would be willing to ignore bad acting and pedestrian directing in order to experience singing, dancing, and talking on the silver screen."

== Sequels ==
MGM later made three more movies with similar titles: Broadway Melody of 1936, Broadway Melody of 1938, and Broadway Melody of 1940. Although not direct sequels in the traditional sense, they all had the same basic premise of a group of people putting on a show (the films also had recurring cast members playing different roles, most notably dancer Eleanor Powell who appeared in all three).

The original movie was remade in 1940 as Two Girls on Broadway. Another Broadway Melody film was planned for 1943 (starring Gene Kelly and Eleanor Powell), but production was cancelled when Kelly was loaned to Columbia for Cover Girl (1944). Broadway Rhythm, a 1944 musical by MGM, was originally to have been titled Broadway Melody of 1944.

== Home media ==
Warner Home Video released The Broadway Melody on a Region 1 special edition DVD in 2005. It is included in the 18-disc Best Picture Oscar Collection, also released by Warner Home Video. The film was given a Blu-ray release from a 4K restoration by Warner Archive in July 2023. After the DVD had been released, a 25- to 30-second establishing shot of New York City, missing from 35mm prints and the DVD release, was discovered in a 16mm print. This footage was put back into the film when Warner Bros. Home Entertainment restored the film for its 2023 Warner Archive Blu-Ray release. However, the entire "Wedding of the Painted Doll" sequence remains in black and white on the Blu-ray.

== See also ==
- List of early color feature films
- List of early sound feature films (1926–1929)
