= Honolulu (film) =

1939 film by Edward Buzzell

- Film poster
- Directed by: Edward Buzzell
- Written by: Herbert Fields; Frank Partos; Harry Ruskin; George Oppenheimer
- Produced by: Jack Cummings
- Starring: Eleanor Powell; Robert Young; George Burns; Gracie Allen
- Cinematography: Ray June
- Edited by: Conrad A. Nervig
- Music by: Harry Warren (songs); Franz Waxman (incidental music)
- Production company: Metro-Goldwyn-Mayer
- Distributed by: Loew's Inc.
- Release date: February 3, 1939
- Running time: 84 minutes
- Country: United States
- Language: English

Honolulu is a 1939 American musical comedy film directed by Edward Buzzell and starring Eleanor Powell, Robert Young, George Burns and Gracie Allen. The picture was produced by Metro-Goldwyn-Mayer. Also appearing in the film are Rita Johnson, Eddie "Rochester" Anderson, Sig Rumann and Ruth Hussey.

== Plot ==
Brooks Mason, a top movie star, is tired of being in the public eye. He discovers that Hawaii-based businessman George Smith looks enough like him to be his twin. He arranges to switch places with Smith temporarily. When Mason steps into Smith's life, he finds himself in a tug-of-war between Smith's fiancée, and a dancer named Dorothy March, with whom he has fallen in love. Meanwhile, Smith discovers that being a movie star is not all that it is made out to be.

Joe Duffy, Mason's garrulous manager, has not been informed of the switch. So when Smith gets fed up with the impersonation and tries to go back to Hawaii, Duffy has him put in a straitjacket for his own good. Luckily, the hotel doctor (Sig Ruman) suggests humoring him by taking him to Hawaii.

Smith arrives minutes before Duffy is to marry Cecelia, and the switch is made without the bride knowing it.

Millie De Grasse then arrives with HER lookalike sister, causing Duffy to faint dead away.

== Cast ==
- Eleanor Powell as Miss Dorothy 'Dot' March
- Robert Young as Brooks Mason / George Smith / David in the movie
- George Burns as Joe Duffy
- Gracie Allen as Millicent 'Millie' De Grasse
- Rita Johnson as Cecelia Grayson
- Clarence Kolb as Mr. Horace Grayson
- Jo Ann Sayers as Nurse
- Ann Morriss as Gale Brewster
- Willie Fung as Wong, Mason's Hawaiian servant
- Cliff Clark as First Detective
- Edward Gargan as Second Detective
- Eddie Anderson as Washington, Mason's Hollywood servant
- Sig Rumann as Professor Timmer, psychiatrist
- Ruth Hussey as Eve, David's wife in the movie
- Russell Hicks as Clifford Jones
- Kealoha Holt as Native Dancing Girl
- Edward LeSaint as Minister
- Edgar Dearing as Jailer
- Tom Neal as Ambulance Intern
- Betty Jaynes as Singer
- Phillip Terry as Bandleader at Costume Party
- Roy Atwell as Bearded Man Aboard Ship (uncredited)

== Production ==
Eleanor Powell's dance routines were given a mostly Hawaiian flavor. One of her routines was performed in blackface in tribute to Powell's idol, Bill 'Bojangles' Robinson. The comedy of Burns and Allen is also featured, although the two actors work separately for much of the movie, their characters only meeting in the final minutes. Powell and Gracie Allen sing and dance together in a sequence featuring the titular song. This was George Burns' last film appearance until his Oscar-winning performance in The Sunshine Boys in 1975. The film is also notable for offering a somewhat rare cinematic look at pre-World War II Honolulu.

There is a musical sequence featuring Gracie Allen, accompanied by musicians made to look like the Marx Brothers (including two Grouchos), while several actors in the audience are costumed to look like such famous actors as Clark Gable, W.C. Fields and Oliver Hardy.

Footage of one of Powell's dance routines (done in a hula skirt to a tiki drum orchestra) would be reused in the later comedy, I Dood It, while another dance performance that was cut from the film appeared seven years later in the "hodge-podge" production The Great Morgan.

== Bibliography ==
- Pugh, Megan. America Dancing: From the Cakewalk to the Moonwalk. Yale University Press, 2015.
