= I Dood It =

1943 musical-comedy film directed by Vincente Minnelli

- theatrical poster
- Directed by: Vincente Minnelli
- Written by: Sig Herzig; Fred Saidy
- Produced by: Jack Cummings
- Starring: Red Skelton; Eleanor Powell
- Cinematography: Ray June; Charles Rosher
- Edited by: Robert J. Kern
- Music by: Georgie Stoll
- Production company: Metro-Goldwyn-Mayer
- Distributed by: Loew's Inc.
- Release date: September 1943
- Running time: 102 minutes
- Country: United States
- Language: English
- Budget: $1,135,000
- Box office: $2,157,000

I Dood It (UK title By Hook or by Crook) is a 1943 American musical comedy film starring Red Skelton and Eleanor Powell, directed by Vincente Minnelli, and released by Metro-Goldwyn-Mayer. The screenplay is by Fred Saidy and Sig Herzig and the film features Richard Ainley, Patricia Dane, Lena Horne, and Hazel Scott. John Hodiak plays a villain in this production, just his third movie role. Jimmy Dorsey and his Orchestra provide musical interludes.

== Plot ==
At a nightclub, Jimmy Dorsey and his orchestra perform "One O'Clock Jump", attended by Broadway star Constance "Connie" Shaw and her fiancé Larry West. Shaw's obsessive fan Joseph "Joe" Renolds also attends, having constantly following her across town. After Dorsey's orchestra finishes, Shaw tells her radio audience she is performing a Western rope dance at a nearby theatre. When the performance ends, Connie kisses her attending fans with a ticket, except Joseph who has misplaced it. Before she leaves, Connie spots Larry kissing socialite Suretta Brenton. Joseph finds his ticket, and gets two kisses from Connie and Suretta.

Enamored, Joe returns to his tailor shop workplace, and returns the borrowed suit. On a subsequent night, Connie arrives at a nightclub and again sees Larry seated next to Suretta. Enraged with jealousy, Constance sits at Joe's table and pretends to be his date. The two perform a dance together. Later, Joe attends another performance of Dixie Lou, a Civil War play starring Connie and Larry. Backstage, Roy Hartwood, an actor performing in the play, is a secret Axis agent tasked to destroy the theatre, which is next door to a war ammunitions warehouse. He is approached by his handler to exit the theatre tomorrow night so it will be demolished by a capsule bomb.

After the play, Kenneth Lawlor, the producer of Dixie Lou, brings Suretta into Constance's dressing room to discuss Suretta being Connie's understudy. Connie immediately notices Suretta's ruby bracelet that Larry had purchased for her. Inflamed with jealousy, Connie destroys her dressing room and storms out. She notices Joseph in the hallway and knowing his infatuation towards her, she impulsively marries him. Sometime later, Connie and Joe return to the nightclub where Connie reveals her marriage, but falsely claims he owns South African gold mines.

During their honeymoon, Connie writes a farewell letter and places a sleeping pill inside Joe's champagne glass. However, Joe switches the glasses, and Connie falls asleep. The next morning, Kenneth visits the newlywed couple at their suite with Larry and Suretta, who has discovered Joe's real occupation. His employer Ed Jackson arrives and reveals Joe actually works as a pants presser. Embarrassed, Connie decides to divorce Joseph. Distraught, Joe returns to his workplace where he dreams of Connie performing a hula dance. Having pity on Joseph, Ed forces him to return to the theatre to see Connie again.

Back at the theatre, Kenneth shows investors his next musical revue, with performances by Hazel Scott and Lena Horne. Joe sneaks in, but is thrown out. He then falls into a crevice outside the theatre, dug by Roy Hartwood. Looking for Connie, Joe mistakenly arrives inside Roy's dressing room, where Roy asks him to be his understudy since Joe has memorized Dixie Lou. Joe performs Roy's part but makes several mishaps, infuriating Kenneth and the theatre staff. During the performance, Joe realizes Roy is a saboteur and tries to prevent the bombing. Backstage, Joe fights Roy, and knocks him out. Impressed by his bravery, Connie professes her love towards him. Joe defuses the bomb and becomes the co-producer of Connie's next show Star Eyes.

== Cast ==
- Red Skelton as Joseph Rivington Renolds
- Eleanor Powell as Constance Shaw
- Richard Ainley as Larry West
- Patricia Dane as Suretta Brenton
- Sam Levene as Ed Jackson
- Jimmy Dorsey as Jimmy Dorsey
- Thurston Hall as Kenneth Lawlor
- Lena Horne as Lena Horne
- Hazel Scott as Hazel Scott
- John Hodiak as Roy Hartwood
- Butterfly McQueen as Annette
- Charles Judels as Stage Manager
- Lionel Braham as Mr. Gillingham (uncredited)
- Tommy Dorsey as himself
- Joe Yule Sr. as theatre doorman (uncredited)
- Margaret Seddon as the elderly lady sitting next to Joe (uncredited)
- Bob Eberly and Helen O'Connell as themselves (singers in Jimmy Dorsey Band)

== Production ==
Powell's most notable performance in the film comes near the beginning when she executes a complex dance routine involving lariats and cowboys. Powell, in her introduction to the book Gotta Sing, Gotta Dance, recalled that she knocked herself unconscious while rehearsing a stunt for this sequence involving a rope and ultimately had to don a football helmet to protect herself. The final dance scene with Powell was taken from Born to Dance (1936). Many of the physical gags were done by Buster Keaton in the film Spite Marriage (1929). Keaton had an uncredited role in writing gags for some of Skelton's early MGM films.

Skelton and Powell had previously worked together in Ship Ahoy (1942). In that film, they appeared with Tommy Dorsey, Jimmy's brother.

This was Powell's final starring role at MGM. After this, she would make a cameo appearance in Thousands Cheer, play a lead role in the United Artists film Sensations of 1945, and return to MGM for a cameo in Duchess of Idaho (1950) before retiring from the screen for good.

The rather ungrammatical title was from one of Red Skelton's radio catchphrases of the day. In 1942, Jack Owens, The Cruising Crooner, wrote a song for Skelton based on it: "I Dood It! (If I Do, I Get a Whippin')", but that song does not appear in this film.

Jimmy Dorsey's theme song "Contrasts" appears in the film. He also performs the jazz and pop standard "Star Eyes" which he was the first to release. The film opens with the Jimmy Dorsey orchestra performing Count Basie's "One O'Clock Jump". As the tempo and energy of the music increases several couples can be seen dancing in the confined space in front of their theater seats, and other fans leave their seats to stand in front of the band stage.

Dance direction in the film was by Bobby Connolly, and the "Western Rope Dance," assisted by Bob Eberly and Jimmy Dorsey's Orchestra, is the second scene in the film.

The doorman was played by Joe Yule Sr., Mickey Rooney's father.

One bit has somebody making a disparaging remark about Jimmy Dorsey's orchestra behind Joe's back. Joe turns around to find himself face-to-face with Jimmy's brother Tommy. (The two brothers notoriously feuded in real life, though they eventually reconciled).

== Box office ==
According to MGM records the film earned $1,615,000 in the US and Canada and $542,000 elsewhere resulting in a profit of $319,000.
