= Born to Dance =

1936 film by Roy Del Ruth

- theatrical release poster
- Directed by: Roy Del Ruth
- Screenplay by: Jack McGowan; Sid Silvers
- Story by: Jack McGowan; Sid Silvers; Buddy G. DeSylva
- Produced by: Jack Cummings
- Starring: Eleanor Powell; James Stewart; Virginia Bruce; Una Merkel; Sid Silvers; Frances Langford; Raymond Walburn; Buddy Ebsen; Alan Dinehart
- Cinematography: Ray June
- Edited by: Blanche Sewell
- Music by: Cole Porter
- Production company: Metro-Goldwyn-Mayer
- Distributed by: Loew's Inc.
- Release date: November 27, 1936 (US)
- Running time: 106 minutes
- Country: United States
- Language: English

Born to Dance is a 1936 American musical film directed by Roy Del Ruth and starring Eleanor Powell, James Stewart, and Virginia Bruce. It was produced and distributed by Metro-Goldwyn-Mayer. The score was composed by Cole Porter.

== Plot ==
While on leave, sailor Ted Barker meets Nora Paige at the Lonely Hearts Club, which is owned by Jenny Saks, the wife of fellow sailor Gunny Saks. Ted instantly falls in love with Nora.

Ted later meets Broadway star Lucy James aboard a submarine while she is on a publicity tour. Her Pekingese dog falls overboard, Ted rescues it, and Lucy falls in love with him. Though Ted has already scheduled a date with Nora, he is ordered by his captain, Dingby, to meet Lucy in a nightclub.

Nora, who lives with Jenny and her daughter, Sally, aspires to become a Broadway dancer. Her newfound career is in serious jeopardy, though, when she inadvertently comes between Lucy and her boss McKay. Nora distances herself from Ted after seeing pictures of Lucy and him in a newspaper the next morning.

Lucy convinces McKay to stop the press campaign, threatening to leave the Broadway production if any more photos or articles about Ted and her are published. Nora becomes Lucy's understudy and thinks about her behavior towards Ted. Nora gets fired suddenly after McKay tells her to perform a dance that Lucy considers undanceable, but Ted knows exactly what to do after he is told the whole story.

== Cast ==
- Eleanor Powell (singing voice dubbed by Marjorie Lane) as Nora Paige
- James Stewart as Ted Barker
- Virginia Bruce as Lucy James
- Una Merkel as Jenny Saks
- Sid Silvers as "Gunny" Sacks
- Frances Langford as "Peppy" Turner
- Raymond Walburn as Captain Dingby
- Alan Dinehart as McKay
- Buddy Ebsen as "Mush" Tracy
- Juanita Quigley as Sally Saks
- Georges and Jalna Toregas as themselves
- Reginald Gardiner as Conducting Central Park Policeman
- Barnett Parker as Floorwalker
- J. Marshall Smith, L. Dwight Snyder, Ray Johnson, Del Porter as the Foursome

== Soundtrack ==
Unless otherwise noted, information is taken from IMDb's soundtrack section for this movie.

- "Rolling Home" (1936)
  - Music and lyrics by Cole Porter
  - Sung by the Foursome, Sid Silvers, Buddy Ebsen, James Stewart, and male chorus
- "Rap, Tap on Wood" (1936) (also called "Rap-Tap on Wood")
  - Music and lyrics by Cole Porter
  - Danced by Eleanor Powell and the Foursome
  - Sung by Marjorie Lane and the Foursome
  - Also danced by Eleanor Powell at a rehearsal
- "Hey, Babe, Hey" (1936)
  - Music and lyrics by Cole Porter
  - Danced by Eleanor Powell, James Stewart, Sid Silvers, Buddy Ebsen, Una Merkel, Frances Langford, and the Foursome
  - Sung by Marjorie Lane, James Stewart, Sid Silvers, Buddy Ebsen, Una Merkel, Frances Langford, and the Foursome
  - Hummed by Una Merkel
  - Played also as background music
- "Entrance of Lucy James" (1936)
  - Music and lyrics by Cole Porter
  - Sung by Raymond Walburn, Virginia Bruce, the Foursome, and male chorus
- "Love Me, Love My Pekinese" (1936)
  - Music and lyrics by Cole Porter
  - Sung by Virginia Bruce and male chorus
  - Danced by Eleanor Powell
- "Easy to Love" (1936)
  - Music and lyrics by Cole Porter
  - Played during the opening credits and as background music
  - Sung by Marjorie Lane and James Stewart, Frances Langford, danced by Langford and Buddy Ebsen
  - Eleanor Powell - visual performance
  - Mock conducted by Reginald Gardiner as the Central Park Policeman, who spoofs conductor Leopold Stokowski, incorporating his long hair and dramatic gestures
  - Reprised by the cast at the end
- "I've Got You Under My Skin" (1936)
  - Music and lyrics by Cole Porter
  - Danced by Georges and Jalna
  - Sung by Virginia Bruce
  - Played also as background music
- "Swingin' the Jinx Away" (1936); (also called "Swinging the Jinx Away")
  - Music and lyrics by Cole Porter
  - Played during the opening credits
  - Sung by Frances Langford, Buddy Ebsen, the Foursome, and male chorus
  - Danced by Buddy Ebsen and Eleanor Powell
- "Sidewalks of New York" (1894)
  - Music by Charles Lawlor
  - Lyrics by James W. Blake
  - In the score during the "Rolling Home" number
- "Columbia, the Gem of the Ocean" (1843)
  - Written by David T. Shaw
  - Arranged by Thomas A. Beckett
  - In the score during the "Rolling Home" number, also in the score during the "Swingin' the Jinx Away" number and partially sung by the chorus
- "The Prisoner's Song (If I Had the Wings of an Angel)" (1924)
  - Music and lyrics by Guy Massey
  - In the underscore when "Gunny" Saks is shown in the brig

== Production ==
The film's working title was This Time It's Love.

The film stars dancer Eleanor Powell and was a follow-up to her successful debut in Broadway Melody of 1936. The film co-stars James Stewart as Powell's love interest and Virginia Bruce as the film's resident femme fatale and Powell's rival. Powell's Broadway Melody co-stars Buddy Ebsen and Frances Langford]return to provide comedy and musical support. Highlights of the film include a rare musical number by Stewart (at which the actor later poked fun in the That's Entertainment! retrospective), and a bombastic finale called "Swingin' the Jinx Away". Set amidst a pre-Second World War naval backdrop, the Depression-era "feel good" number (which runs nearly 10 minutes) makes topical references to the economy and political leaders (with a "shout out" to Cab Calloway thrown in for good measure) sung by Powell, adds in an eccentric dance routine by Ebsen, and ends in a flurry of tap dancing by Powell culminating in a patriotic salute, and finally a blast of cannon fire. This finale was also lifted in its entirety and reused in another Powell film, I Dood It, co-starring Red Skelton. Although considered one of Powell's (and MGM's) most memorable musical numbers, and often featured in retrospectives such as That's Entertainment!, musical director Roger Edens was often quoted as being embarrassed by the segment.

In 1936, a part was written for Judy Garland. Cole Porter wrote in his diary that it was his "great Joy" that he was writing for a film featuring Garland. Her part was written out of the film, though, before she could begin any work on the film.

The film introduced the Porter standards "You'd Be So Easy to Love" (performed by Stewart and Marjorie Lane, dubbed for Powell) and "I've Got You Under My Skin" (performed by Bruce), which was nominated for the Academy Award for Best Original Song. It was the first film in which Stewart sang.

Some of the musical numbers were recorded in stereophonic sound, making this one of the first films to use multichannel technology. Rhino Records included the stereo tracks in its soundtrack album, released on CD, including Jimmy Stewart and Marjorie Lane's performance of "You'd Be So Easy to Love".

== Accolades ==
The film was nominated for two Academy Awards; Cole Porter was nominated for Best Song for "I've Got You Under My Skin," and Dave Gould was nominated for Best Dance Direction.

The film was nominated by American Film Institute in 2004 in its AFI's 100 Years...100 Songs for "I've Got You Under My Skin".
