= Virginia O'Brien =

American actress and singer (1919–2001)

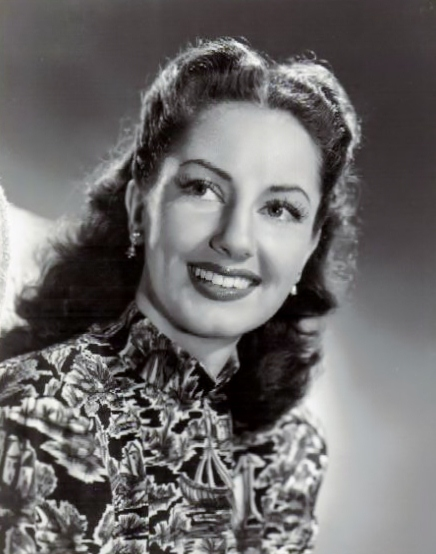
- O'Brien in the 1940s
- Born: Virginia Lee O'Brien; April 18, 1919; Los Angeles, California, U.S.
- Died: January 16, 2001 (aged 81); Woodland Hills, California, U.S.
- Resting place: Forest Lawn Memorial Park, Glendale, California
- Occupations: Actress, singer
- Years active: 1940–2001
- Known for: Roles in MGM musicals
- Spouses: Kirk Alyn (m. 1942; div. 1955) Vern Evans (m. 1958; div. 1966) Harry B. White (m. 1968; died 1996)
- Children: 4

Virginia Lee O'Brien (April 18, 1919 – January 16, 2001) was an American actress, singer, and radio personality known for her comedic singing roles in Metro-Goldwyn-Mayer musicals of the 1940s.

== Life and career ==
O'Brien primarily performed in comedic roles during the height of her formal film career. This was in part due to her humorous singing style, which involved her singing in a deadpan manner, with no facial expressions and very little movement– reportedly she stumbled upon this "gimmick" by accident during a stage show when she became virtually paralyzed with stage fright before singing a number in the Los Angeles stage production Meet the People. The audience found the performance to be hilarious and she was soon hired to repeat this performance in a number of movies beginning in 1940, for which she gained the nicknames "Frozen Face" and "Miss Ice Glacier" amongst others. When she was not singing, her acting style was just as emotive as other actresses, and she did not always employ her gimmick when singing, as evidenced by her performance in the excerpt from Show Boat in the 1946 film Till the Clouds Roll By. She made her Broadway debut in the short-lived musical Keep Off the Grass with Jimmy Durante and recorded four of the songs for Columbia Records. She also recorded several sides for Decca Records, including two of her signature songs – "The Wild, Wild West" and "Say We're Sweethearts Again".

Among the films she appeared in at MGM were The Big Store (1941) with the Marx Brothers, Lady Be Good (1941), Ship Ahoy (1942) with Eleanor Powell and Red Skelton, Thousands Cheer (in which she endured ribbing from Mickey Rooney about her singing style), Du Barry Was a Lady (with Skelton and Lucille Ball), the film version of Meet the People with Dick Powell, The Harvey Girls (with Judy Garland) though she dropped out halfway through filming due to a pregnancy, and Ziegfeld Follies. After appearing once again with Red Skelton in 1947's Merton of the Movies and after a guest appearance the following year in the short, Musical Merry-Go-Round, O'Brien was suddenly dropped from her MGM film contract, and she moved into television and back to live performances.

She made two film appearances after this: Francis in the Navy (1955) and a brief appearance in the 1976 Walt Disney Studios comedy, Gus. She was among the stars in a 1972 nostalgia revue entitled The Big Show of 1928 with Allan Jones, Cass Daley, Beatrice Kay, and Sally Rand, which toured the country and played New York's Madison Square Garden. In 1984, she created a cabaret act, "Virginia O'Brien Salutes the Great MGM Musicals," which was recorded at the Masquer's Club in Hollywood, and is currently available on CD and on iTunes. She performed several times at such clubs as Hollywood's Roosevelt Hotel Cinegrill, the Vine St. Bar and Grill, and the Gardenia, as well as the Plush Room in San Francisco.

She continued to perform well into the 1990s with both her one-woman show and a production of Show Boat, co-starring Alan Young, and also headlined The Fabulous Palm Springs Follies.

She died aged 81 in Woodland Hills, California, from natural causes. She is buried at the Forest Lawn Memorial Park in Glendale, California.

== Filmography ==
Year	Film	Role	Notes
1940	Hullabaloo	Virginia Ferris	
1940	Sky Murder	Lucille LaVonne (uncredited)	
1941	The Big Store	Kitty	
1941	Lady Be Good	Lull	
1941	Ringside Maisie	Herself	Specialty Singer
1942	Panama Hattie	Flo Foster	
1942	Ship Ahoy	Fran Evans	
1943	Thousands Cheer	Herself	Specialty Singer
1943	Du Barry Was a Lady	Ginny	
1944	Two Girls and a Sailor	Herself	Specialty Singer
1944	Meet the People	"Woodpecker" Peg	
1946	The Show-Off	Hortense	
1946	Till the Clouds Roll By	Ellie Mae	in Show Boat/Specialty Singer
1946	Ziegfeld Follies		Specialty Singer
1946	The Harvey Girls	Alma from Ohio	
1947	Merton of the Movies	Phyllis Montague	
1948	Musical Merry-Go-Round	Herself	Specialty Singer
1955	Francis in the Navy	Nurse Kittredge	
1976	Gus	Reporter	
