= I've Got My Eyes on You (1939 song) =

1939 song by Cole Porter

"I've Got My Eyes on You" is a popular song by Cole Porter, published in 1939 and written for the Hollywood musical film Broadway Melody of 1940 where it was introduced by Fred Astaire.

== Other recordings ==
The song has since been recorded by a number of artists, including:

- Patti Page for her album In the Land of Hi-Fi (1956)
- Fred Astaire for his album The Astaire Story (1952)
- Dianne Reeves (in 2005) for the Grammy Award-winning soundtrack to Good Night, and Good Luck.

== Other appearances ==
- Later that year, it was included in Andy Hardy's Private Secretary (1940) where it was sung by Kathryn Grayson.
- It appears, played as background music, by a band in the 1956 musical High Society, starring Frank Sinatra, Bing Crosby and Grace Kelly.
- The song was used in the 1940 comedy The Philadelphia Story starring Katharine Hepburn and Cary Grant, in which it was played at the party the night before the wedding.
