= The Ross Sisters =

Trio of American singers

- Genres: Vocal group, acrobats, contortionists
- Years active: c.1942–1948
- Past members: Betsy Ann aka Dorothy Jean Ross ("Aggie"); Veda Victoria aka Eva Vicki Ross ("Maggie"); Dixie Jewell aka Veda Victoria Ross ("Elmira")

The Ross Sisters were a trio of American singers and dancers consisting of Betsy Ann Ross (1926–1996), Veda Victoria "Vicki" Ross (1927–2002), and Dixie Jewell Ross (1929–1963), who used the stage names Aggie, Maggie, and Elmira. They performed as a three-part harmony trio, who also danced and were particularly noted for their acrobatics and contortionism. Their careers peaked during the 1940s, when they featured prominently in the 1944 Metro-Goldwyn-Mayer musical film Broadway Rhythm, footage from which appeared in the 1994 compilation film That's Entertainment! III.

== Early life and performing careers ==
The Ross sisters were born in West Texas, to Veda Cordelia Lipham and Charles Adolphus Ross. Their performances were first reviewed in Billboard in September 1942, when they appeared in Boston in the show Count Me In. The reviewer wrote, "The acrobatic antics of the Ross Sisters stop the show on two occasions. These kids are fresh, and their work is sensational." In May 1943 they appeared in Post War Revue, presented by Billy Rose at the Diamond Horseshoe nightclub in New York City, where a review praised their "amazing acro contortion work".

After performing a "grand acrobatic dance" in the 1944 MGM musical film Broadway Rhythm, to the song "Solid Potato Salad" co-written by Don Raye, Gene de Paul and Hughie Prince, they appeared regularly in nightclub shows around the United States. In May 1944, a reviewer noted that: "Girls are weak in the voice department but go over on the contortion stuff. Trick back bends with hanky pick-ups raise a flock of oohs and aahs from customers. Gals walk off to a good hand." The sisters arrived in Southampton, England, on the Queen Mary in September 1946. Several weeks later, they performed before King George VI and Queen Elizabeth at the 1946 Royal Variety Performance at the London Palladium. They were featured in Piccadilly Hayride, a London stage revue starring comedian Sid Field, that ran from 1946 to 1948, and performed "Five Minutes More", a song by Sammy Cahn and Jule Styne, which was a hit for Frank Sinatra.

By 1950, the sisters had all married, and there are no records of later public performances.

== Biographical details ==
Published sources and some official records conflict on the names and dates of the sisters, as they appear to have used each other's names at different times. When Broadway Rhythm was filmed, birth records indicate that the sisters were between about 14 and 17 years old. It has been suggested that in order to perform in London in 1946, the two younger sisters assumed the identity of their next oldest sister to make them appear to be older than their true age. The oldest of the three used the identity of an older sister who had died as an infant. They were recorded on the Queen Mary passenger list as Dorothy (aged 21), Eva (20) and Victoria (18), though their real names and ages were Betsy Ann (20), Veda Victoria (18), and Dixie (17). Each sister also used a different stage name.

- Betsy Ann Ross (also known as Dorothy Jean Ross; stage name "Aggie") was born on June 26, 1926, in Colorado City, Texas. Her birth name was Eva, but she was recorded as Betsy Ann Ross in the 1930 US Census. She used the name and identity of a sister, Dorothy Jean Ross, who had died as a baby. She married Burnice C. (also known as Robert "Bunny") Hightower, an American dancer, in 1947. He has been described as an alcoholic suffering from schizophrenia who once beat her so badly that she almost died. They appeared together many times on The Ed Sullivan Show. They divorced in 1957, and she married Hieronymus "Rony" Abagi, with whom she had two daughters. They divorced in 1969, and shortly afterwards she remarried Hightower, who died the following year. Dorothy Jean Hightower died in Troup, Texas, on November 21, 1996.
- Veda Victoria Ross (also known as Eva Vicki Ross; stage name "Maggie") was born on November 8, 1927, in Roscoe, Texas. She later adopted the name Eva from her elder sister's birth name and was known as Eva Vicki. She married puppeteer Robert Lamouret in Paris in 1950, and had two daughters with him. Lamouret's act included Dudule, a duck puppet dressed in a sailor's outfit. Lamouret and Dudule were featured in RKO Radio Pictures' 1949 musical revue Make Mine Laughs, and they also appeared in episodes of The Ed Sullivan Show. On the July 28, 1957, broadcast of What's My Line?, she appeared as a guest. She used the name Eva Lamouret and surprised the panel (but did not stump them) by revealing that she was a chiropractor. After her husband's death in 1959, Eva Vicki Lamouret married Robert Sherman Hender; they divorced in 1973. She died in Maitland, Florida, on May 29, 2002.
- Dixie Jewell Ross (also known as Veda Victoria Ross; stage name "Elmira") was born on August 9, 1929, in Loraine, Texas. Using her sister's name Veda Victoria Ross, she married English entertainer Dickie Henderson in London on July 10, 1948; they had a son and a daughter. Dixie Henderson died aged 33, on her wedding anniversary, July 10, 1963, following an overdose of barbiturates, and is buried in Gunnersbury Cemetery, Acton.

After their father's death in 1955, their mother remarried and was known as Veda Matteson; she died, aged 94, in 2000.
