= Sensations of 1945 =

1944 film by Andrew L. Stone

- Directed by: Andrew Stone
- Written by: Frederick J. Jackson; Andrew Stone
- Produced by: Felix Jackson; James Nasser; Andrew Stone
- Starring: Eleanor Powell; Dennis O'Keefe; W.C. Fields
- Cinematography: Peverell Marley; John Mescall
- Edited by: James Smith
- Music by: Al Sherman; Harry Tobias; Mort Glickman; Heinz Roemheld; Jack Yellen
- Distributed by: United Artists
- Release date: June 30, 1944
- Running time: 86 minutes
- Country: United States
- Language: English

Sensations of 1945 is a 1944 American musical-comedy film directed by Andrew Stone and starring Eleanor Powell. Released by United Artists, the film was an attempt to recapture the ensemble style of films such as Broadway Melody of 1936 by showcasing a number of top musical and comedy acts of the day, in a film linked together by a loose storyline. Sensations of 1945 stars dancer Powell and Dennis O'Keefe as two rival publicists who fall in love, but the film's main purpose is to showcase a variety of different acts, ranging from tightrope walking to comedy to Powell's athletic tap dancing. The rollicking supporting cast features W.C. Fields in his final role the year before his death, C. Aubrey Smith, Eugene Pallette, dancer David Lichine, Lyle Talbot, Sophie Tucker, jazz pianist Dorothy Donegan, Cab Calloway, Woody Herman, jazz pianist/composer Gene Rodgers, and Les Paul.

The picture is notable for several reasons. It was Powell's first and only film after leaving Metro-Goldwyn-Mayer, where she became a star nearly a decade earlier; it was also her final starring role in a film, after which she would only make a cameo in MGM's Duchess of Idaho in 1950 and some unused footage of her would appear in a 1946 MGM compilation, The Great Morgan. Powell's dance inside a giant pinball machine (as part of the song, "Spin Little Pinball") has been cited by critics variously as both a highlight and as the nadir of her film career.

Hubert Castle plays the role of Olaf, “The Great Gustafson”; the setting of Olaf’s high-wire publicity stunt is the Royal Gorge in Colorado.

The film was nominated for an Academy Award for Best Music Scoring.

== Cast ==
- Eleanor Powell as Ginny Walker
- Dennis O'Keefe as Junior Crane
- C. Aubrey Smith as Dan Lindsey
- Eugene Pallette as Gus Crane
- Mimi Forsythe as Julia Westcott
- Lyle Talbot as Randall
- Hubert Castle as The Great Gustafson
- W. C. Fields as himself
- Sophie Tucker as herself
- Dorothy Donegan as herself
- The Christianis as Themselves
- Pallenberg Bears as Themselves
- Cab Calloway and His Band as Themselves
- Woody Herman and His Band as Themselves
- David Lichine as himself
- Richard Hageman as Pendergast
- Marie Blake as Miss Grear
- Stanley Andrews as Mr. Collins
- "Uncle Willie" as himself
- Gene Rodgers as himself
- Mel Hall as himself
- Johnson Brothers as Themselves
- Flying Copelands as Themselves
- Starless Night as himself
- Les Paul Trio as Themselves
- And Louise Currie, Constance Purdy, Wendell Niles, Anthony Warde
