= Lady Be Good (1941 film) =

1941 film by Norman Z. McLeod

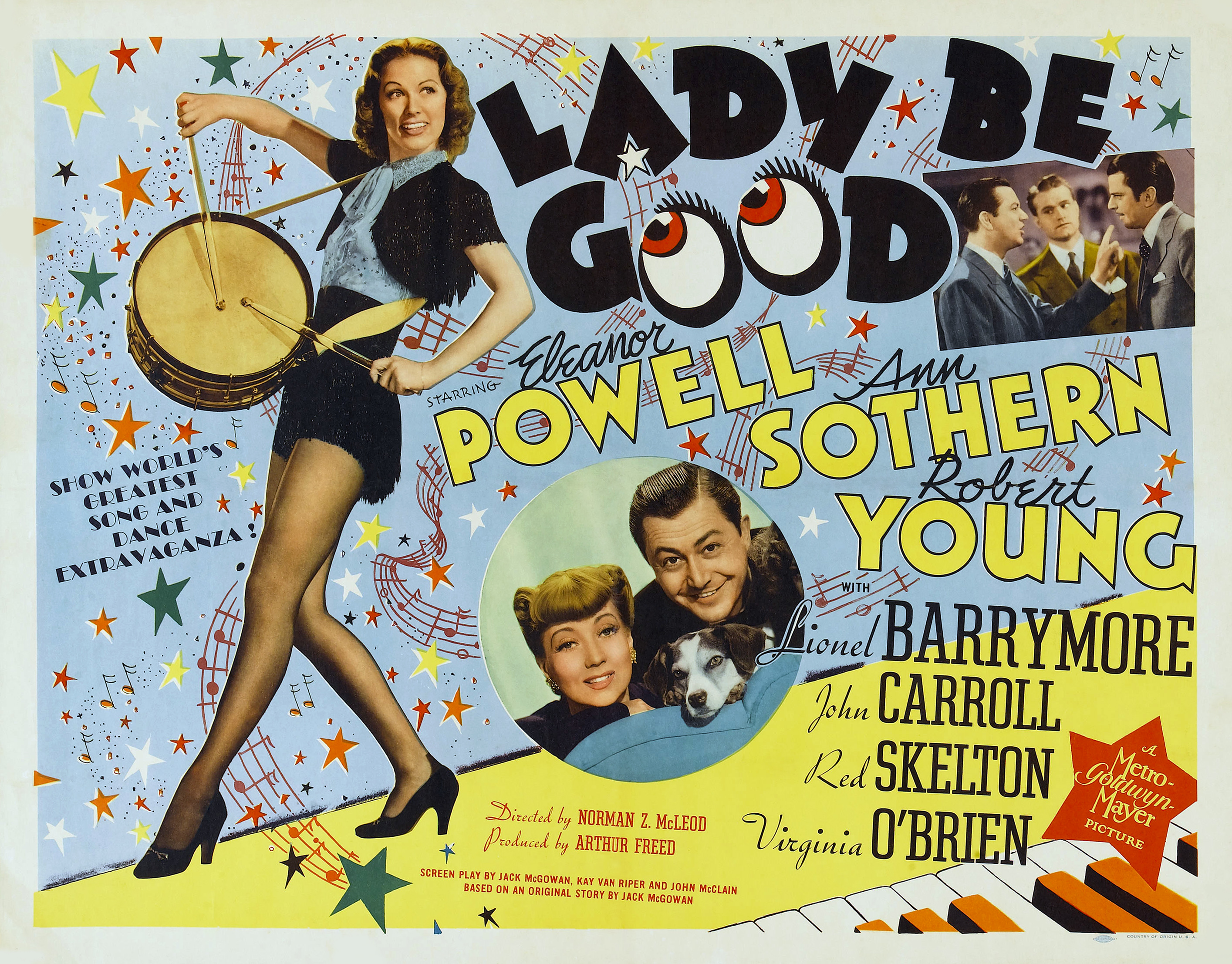
- Film poster
- Directed by: Norman Z. McLeod
- Written by: Jack McGowan; Kay Van Riper; John McClain
- Produced by: Arthur Freed
- Starring: Eleanor Powell; Robert Young; Ann Sothern; John Carroll
- Cinematography: George J. Folsey; Oliver T. Marsh
- Edited by: Fredrick Y. Smith
- Music by: Roger Edens; Jerome Kern; Oscar Hammerstein II; George Gershwin; Ira Gershwin
- Production company: Metro-Goldwyn-Mayer
- Distributed by: Loew's Inc.
- Release date: September 1, 1941 (U.S.)
- Running time: 112 minutes
- Country: United States
- Language: English

Lady Be Good is an American musical film directed by Norman Z. McLeod and starring Eleanor Powell, Ann Sothern, Robert Young, Lionel Barrymore, and Red Skelton. It was made by Metro-Goldwyn-Mayer and produced by Arthur Freed. This was the first of several films Powell made with Skelton. Powell received top billing, but Sothern and Young are the main stars. They play, respectively, Dixie Donegan, a would-be lyricist, and Eddie Crane, a struggling composer.

The film takes its title and theme song ("Oh, Lady be Good!") from the 1924 George and Ira Gershwin Broadway musical, Lady Be Good, but otherwise has no connection to the play. According to film historian Robert Osborne in his introduction to a broadcast of the film on Turner Classic Movies in August 2006, MGM devised the film as a vehicle to launch Sothern as a musical star. Since she and Young were known primarily as light comic stars, the studio brought in Powell for a supporting role, but gave her top billing to attract audiences.

This film's most notable sequence involves an epic tap dance routine by Powell, to the melody of Gershwin's "Fascinating Rhythm" (another song taken from the play). This musical number later featured in two films in the That's Entertainment! documentary series. In one of the films (That's Entertainment! III), behind-the-scenes footage reveals how this scene was accomplished. So Powell could dance between a series of pianos without interruption, stage hands quietly removed pieces of the set off-camera as she worked her way across the stage. This musical sequence was directed by Busby Berkeley. Another sequence features Powell doing a dance routine with a dog that she trained for the number. There are also phenomenal dance routines by the Berry Brothers. The film won an Academy Award for Best Song for "The Last Time I Saw Paris," composed by Jerome Kern and Oscar Hammerstein II.

== Plot ==
The story is framed by testimony in the court of Judge Murdock, where Dixie Crane is seeking a divorce. He asks how the principals first met and the first flashback begins...Eddie Crane a young composer, is struggling with a tune he has just written. When his girlfriend, Dixie Donegan, provides words almost by accident, the song is published and is a great success. A few years later, now married and successful songwriters with a hit Broadway show behind them, Dixie realizes that Eddie is spending more time in rich New York society than composing. They divorce, but quickly realize they miss working together; their new work raises them to the top of the charts and they are honored at an industry banquet, where Dixie sings ”The Last Time I Saw Paris.” (The song won the Academy Award for Best Original Song for 1941, even though it was not written for the film.) Eddie becomes intensely jealous, and thanks to the machinations of their friends, they end up getting married again. Driving home after the ceremony, they discover that their plans are very different. Dixie wants to start writing the music for a big new show—their dream project—right away. Eddie plans a honeymoon in Bermuda first. Dixie not only refuses the honeymoon, she tells him they are going to have to continue to live apart while they write the new show. They separate, and Eddie quits the show. He begins composing a symphony under the aegis of Mrs. Wardley, a wealthy patron of the arts who has her eye on Eddie as well as his music. The opening of Dixie's show is represented by the legendary “Fascinatin’ Rhythm” production number featuring Eleanor Powell. Eddie disappears for 6 months and returns from South America too late to protest the second divorce, also in Judge Murdock’s court. Not realizing that this time the judge refused to grant it, he proposes to Dixie.

== Cast ==
- Eleanor Powell as Marilyn Marsh
- Ann Sothern as Dixie Donegan
- Robert Young as Eddie Crane
- Lionel Barrymore as Judge Murdock
- John Carroll as Buddy Crawford
- Red Skelton as Joe 'Red' Willet
- Virginia O'Brien as Lull
- Tom Conway as Mr. Blanton
- Dan Dailey as Bill Pattison
- Reginald Owen as Max Milton
- Rose Hobart as Mrs. Wardley
- Phil Silvers as Nightclub Compere
- Connie Russell as Singer
- Berry Brothers as Themselves

== Songs ==
- "You'll Never Know" (music & lyrics by Roger Edens)
- "Your Words and My Music" (music by Edens, lyrics by Arthur Freed)
- "Lady Be Good" (music by George Gershwin, lyrics by Ira Gershwin)
- "The Last Time I Saw Paris" (music by Jerome Kern, lyrics by Oscar Hammerstein II)
- "Fascinating Rhythm" (music by George Gershwin, lyrics by Ira Gershwin)

== Legacy ==
The name Lady Be Good was bestowed on an American B-24D Liberator bomber, which flew for the United States Army Air Forces during World War II out of North Africa. It disappeared on April 4, 1943, during the raid on Naples, Italy. It was found virtually intact in the Libyan desert in 1958.

The film is recognized by American Film Institute in these lists:

- 2004: AFI's 100 Years...100 Songs:
  - "The Last Time I Saw Paris" – Nominated

== See also ==
- Lionel Barrymore filmography
