= Two Girls on Broadway =

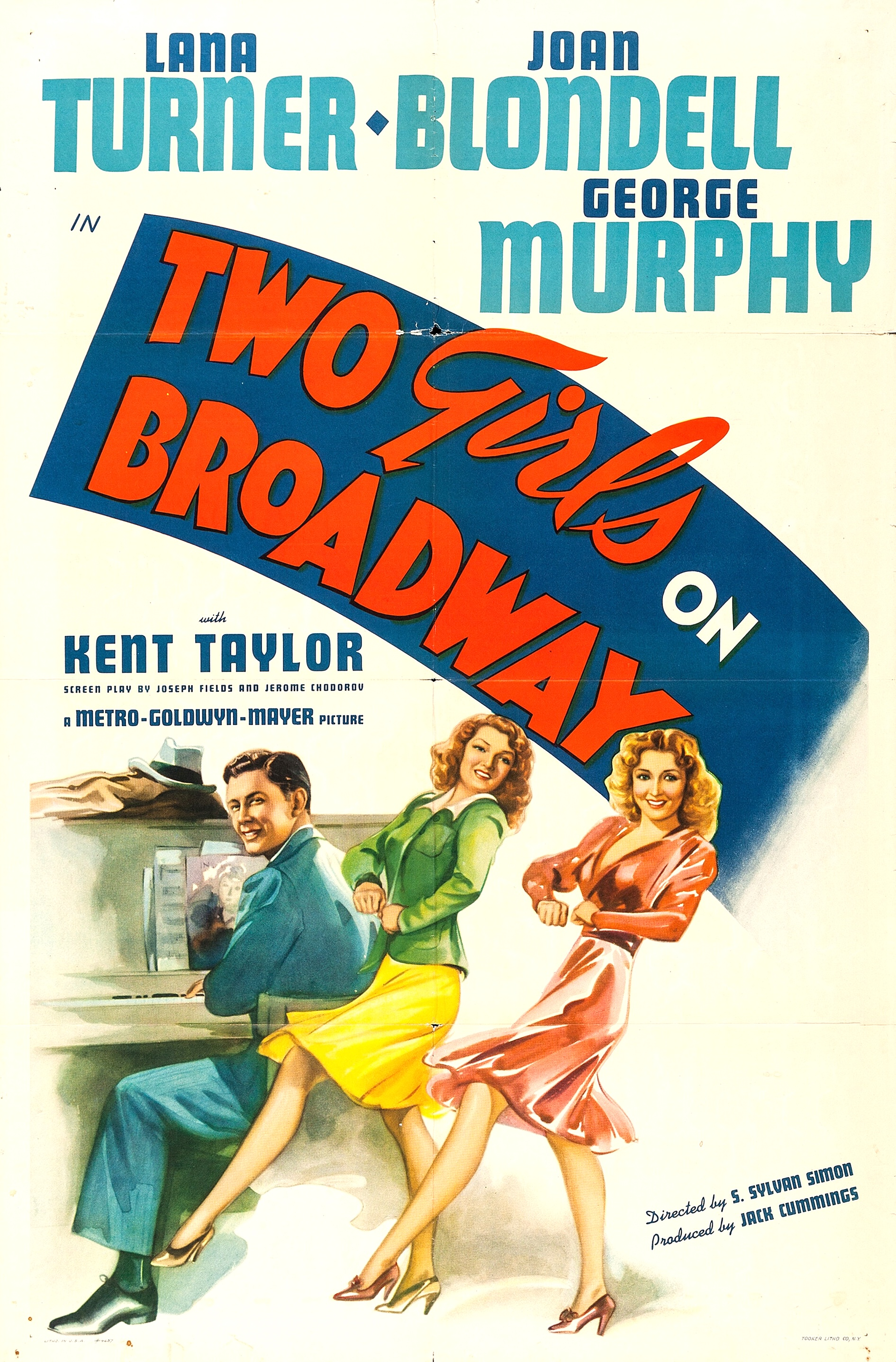
- Theatrical poster
- Directed by: S. Sylvan Simon
- Written by: Joseph Fields; Jerome Chodorov
- Story by: Edmund Goulding
- Produced by: Jack Cummings
- Starring: Lana Turner; Joan Blondell; George Murphy; Kent Taylor
- Cinematography: George J. Folsey
- Edited by: Blanche Sewell
- Music by: David Raksin; Robert W. Stringer
- Production company: Metro-Goldwyn-Mayer
- Distributed by: Loew's Inc.
- Release date: April 19, 1940
- Running time: 73 minutes
- Country: United States
- Language: English
- Budget: $427,000
- Box office: $673,000

Two Girls on Broadway is a 1940 American musical film directed by S. Sylvan Simon and starring Lana Turner and Joan Blondell. It follows two sisters attempting to forge a career as Broadway performers. The film is a remake of The Broadway Melody (1929).

== Plot ==
Molly Mahoney forms a vaudeville act with her fiancé Eddie Kerns. Working at a local dance school in small-town Nebraska, she longs to become a star performing on Broadway. Eddie persuades her to leave town for New York City, and after their arrival, Eddie debuts on the radio with his so-called singing canaries. Although the canaries are unable to sing, Eddie is not, and following an impressive debut he is offered a job at the station. He convinces co-worker Buddy Bartell to grant Molly and her little sister Pat an audition.

What promised to be a big opportunity turns into the start of noticeable tensions between the sisters, when Bartell announces he wants to team Eddie and Pat. Molly, meanwhile, is offered a degrading job selling cigarettes. Instead of complaining, Molly swallows her pride and allows Pat to take the limelight meant for her. Meanwhile, wealthy and often-married playboy 'Chat' Chatsworth falls for Pat and starts flirting with her. After a while, Molly finds out about Chat's wild past through her gossipy friend Jed Marlowe, and tries to warn her sister.

Her worries turn out to be unnecessary, though, as Pat feels more attracted to Eddie. She does not want to hurt Molly's feeling or ruin her engagement, and decides to return home. Molly, who is unaware of Pat's motives for leaving, insists that she stay. Thinking it is the only way of forgetting her feelings for Eddie, Pat accepts a proposal from Chat and elopes with him. When Eddie hears about this, he is alarmed, because he had been secretly in love with Pat the entire time. He admits his true feeling for Pat to Molly, and is encouraged to follow her. However, upon arriving at the apartment, Eddie finds out that Pat and Chat have already left.

Overhearing one of Chat's servants of Pat and Chat's whereabouts, Eddie rushes to City Hall. Breaking up a wedding ceremony that has already begun, Eddie professes his love for Pat. With the blessing of Molly, Pat and Eddie decide to marry, while Molly returns home.

== Cast ==
- Lana Turner as Patricia 'Pat' Mahoney
- Joan Blondell as Molly Mahoney
- George Murphy as Eddie Kerns
- Kent Taylor as 'Chat' Chatsworth
- Richard Lane as Buddy Bartell
- Wallace Ford as Jed Marlowe
- Otto Hahn as Ito, Chatworth's servant
- Lloyd Corrigan as Judge Hennessey
- Don Wilson as Mr. Boyle, Radio Announcer
- Charles Wagenheim as Harry, Bartell's Assistant
- May McAvoy - uncredited

== Production ==
The film was Joan Blondell's first film for Metro-Goldwyn-Mayer. By the time of production, Lana Turner was hailed 'The Girl They're All Talking About! Lovely Lana, America's Blonde Bonfire, in her hottest, most daring role!' Being in the middle of a highly publicized career, Turner was in the position to demand top billing, even though she was less experienced than her co-stars.

Principal photography for Two Girls on Broadway began in January 1940.

== Release ==
Two Girls on Broadway was released theatrically in the United States on April 19, 1940.

=== Home media ===
The film was made available on DVD by the Warner Archive Collection on August 23, 2010.

== Reception ==
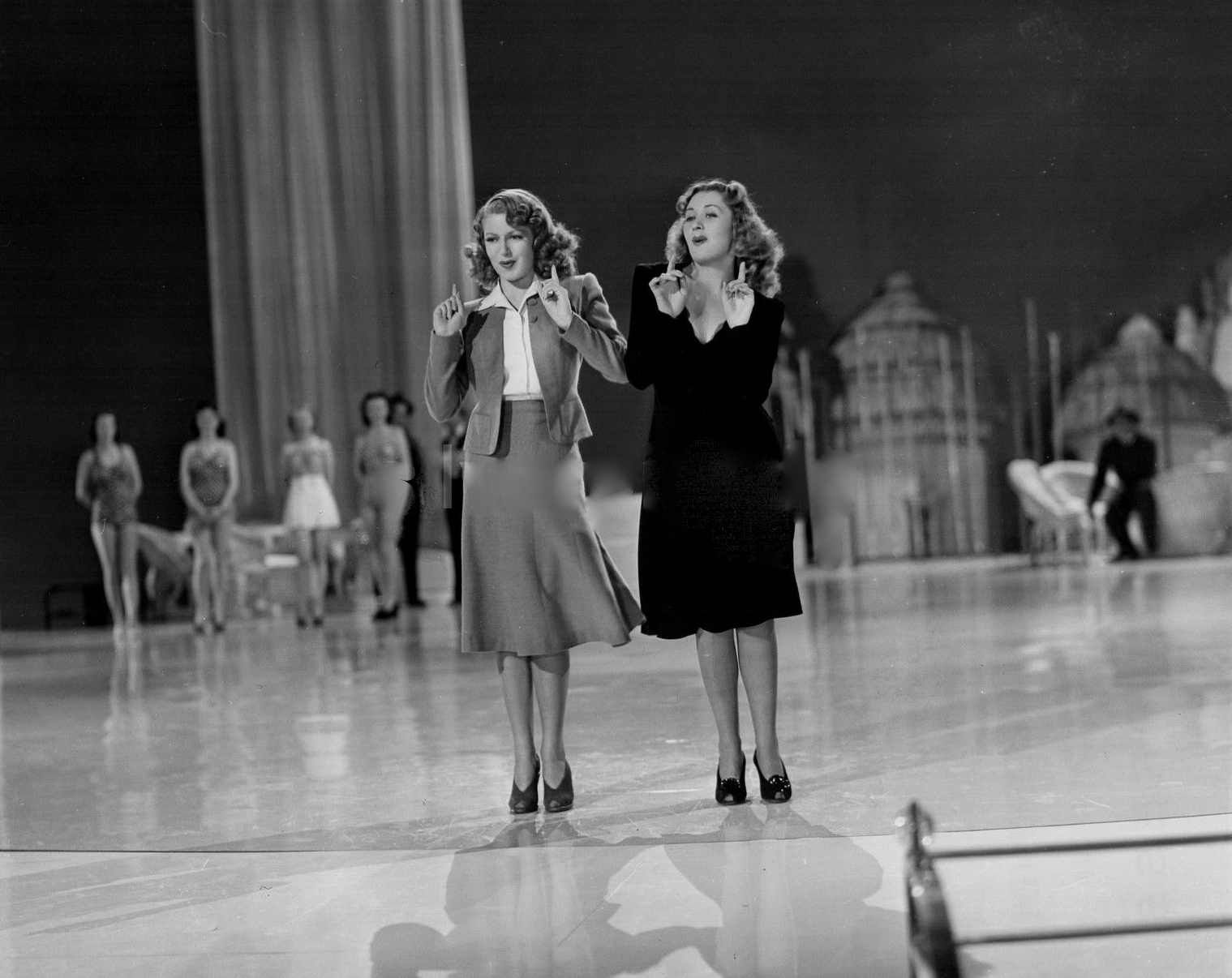
Turner and Blondell during an on-set rehearsal

=== Box office ===
According to MGM records the film earned $475,000 in the US and Canada and $198,000 elsewhere resulting in a profit of $12,000.

=== Critical response ===
The film received mixed reviews, with most critics complaining about the plot taking a second place to showcasing Turner. A New York Times critic wrote: "With Lana Turner figuring prominently in the doings, it is fairly safe to predict that none of the patrons will bother to inquire where and when they have seen Two Girls on Broadway before. There is an indefinable something about Miss Turner that makes it a matter of small concern." Wanda Hale of the New York Daily News gave the film a mixed review, noting that the story "doesn't seem as effective as it did back in 1929," though she praised Blondell's performance as well as that of Wallace Ford.

Alternately, Turner was praised for her musical talents, one reviewer describing her dance abilities as "precision and grace". A critic for The Hollywood Reporter even wrote that she should be teamed with Fred Astaire. Wood Soanes of the Oakland Tribune also praised Turner's performance, and described the film as a "pleasing fable."
