= Ship Ahoy (film) =

1942 film by Edward Buzzell

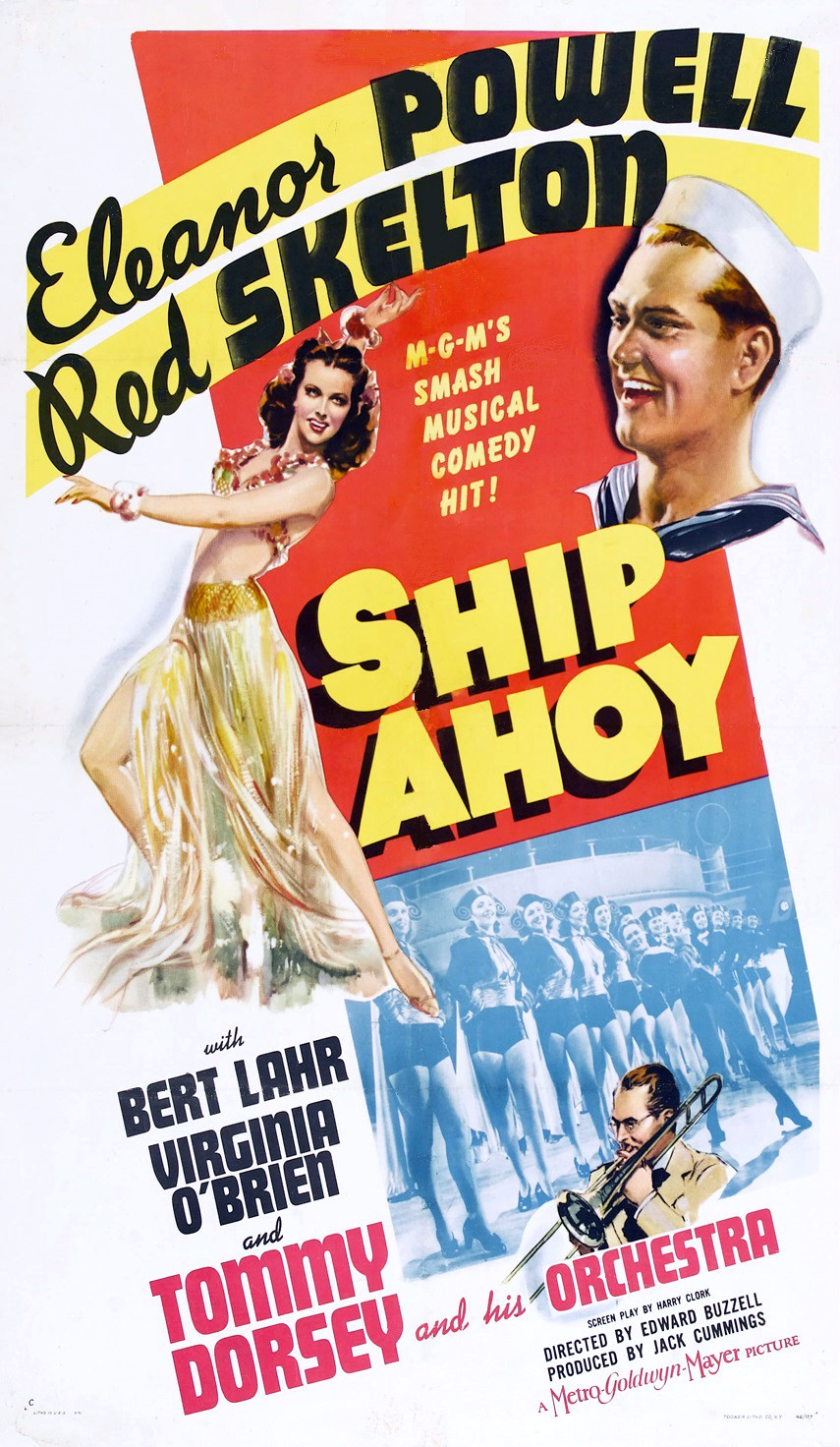
- Theatrical poster
- Directed by: Edward Buzzell
- Screenplay by: Harry Clork; Irving Brecher(uncredited); Harry Kurnitz(uncredited)
- Story by: Matt Brooks; Bradford Ropes; Bert Kalmar
- Produced by: Jack Cummings
- Starring: Eleanor Powell; Red Skelton; Bert Lahr; Virginia O'Brien
- Cinematography: Robert H. Planck; Leonard Smith; Clyde De Vinna
- Edited by: Blanche Sewell
- Music by: Score: George Bassman; George Stoll; Songs: Burton Lane (music); Yip Harburg (lyrics)
- Production company: Metro-Goldwyn-Mayer
- Distributed by: Loew's Inc.
- Release date: May 1942
- Running time: 95 minutes
- Country: United States
- Language: English
- Budget: $1,037,000
- Box office: $2,507,000

Ship Ahoy is a 1942 American musical-comedy film directed by Edward Buzzell and starring Eleanor Powell and Red Skelton. It was produced by MGM.

== Plot ==
Tallulah Winters is a dancing star who is hired to perform on an ocean liner. Before she leaves, she is recruited by what she believes is a branch of the American government and asked to smuggle a prototype explosive mine out of the country. In fact, she is unknowingly working for Nazi agents who have stolen the mine. Meanwhile, Merton Kibble, a writer of pulp fiction adventure stories suffering from severe writer's block, is on the same ship, and soon he finds himself embroiled in Tallulah's real-life adventure.

The brief finale takes place in front of a Navy recruiting station, surrounded by a chorus of sailors. The guys and their girls—and Dorsey's orchestra —are all in uniform, singing "Last Call for Love".

== Cast ==
- Eleanor Powell as Tallulah Winters
- Red Skelton as Merton K. Kibble
- Bert Lahr as "Skip" Owens
- Virginia O'Brien as Fran Evans
- William Post Jr. as H. U. Bennett
- James Cross as "Stump"
- Eddie Hartman as "Stumpy"
- Stuart Crawford as Art Higgins
- John Emery as Dr. Farno
- Bernard Nedell as Pietro Polesi
- Philip Ahn as Felix
- Nestor Paiva as Waldo
- Mariska Aldrich as Waldo's mother
- Tommy Dorsey as himself
- Frank Sinatra as himself
- Buddy Rich as himself
- Ziggy Elman as himself
- Moroni Olsen as Inspector Davis
- George Watts as hotel detective
- Ralph Dunn as Flammer
- William Tannen as Grimes

== Production ==
Frank Sinatra's uncredited performance as a singer with the Tommy Dorsey Orchestra was an important early step in establishing his film career.

The movie includes a number in which Powell's character, communicates with US agent in the audience by tapping out a message in morse code.

Metro-Goldwyn-Mayer's promotional efforts included a war bonds tour with members of the cast.

The film was to be called I'll Take Manila but was renamed after the Japanese captured the Philippines. The setting was changed to Puerto Rico and the song “I'll Take Manila" became "I'll Take Tallulah".

Skelton and Powell next paired up in 1943's I Dood It. In that film, they appeared with Jimmy Dorsey, Tommy's brother.

== Reception ==
The film got strong reviews which helped it succeed at the box office. In his June 26, 1942 review in The New York Times, Bosley Crowther lightly praised the “moderate and tuneful little cruise…Metro has stretched the whole thing out about half again as long as it should be, with the consequence that it sags and labors rather heavily in spots. But it skips along right merrily when Miss Powell is doing her turns, especially in a lively rhythm number to a tune called "I'll Take Tallulah." “ Variety panned the film, "The names on the marquee will mean a fair amount of business for this musical, though the asinine story and treatment, plodding direction and some rather poor performances would ordinarily scuttle a film like 'Ship Ahoy? If ever a picture in recent years looked as though it was shot off the director's cuff, this is it."

According to MGM records the film earned $1,831,000 at the US and Canadian box office and $676,000 elsewhere, making the studio an estimated profit of $1,470,000.
