= Broadway Melody of 1940 =

1940 film by Norman Taurog

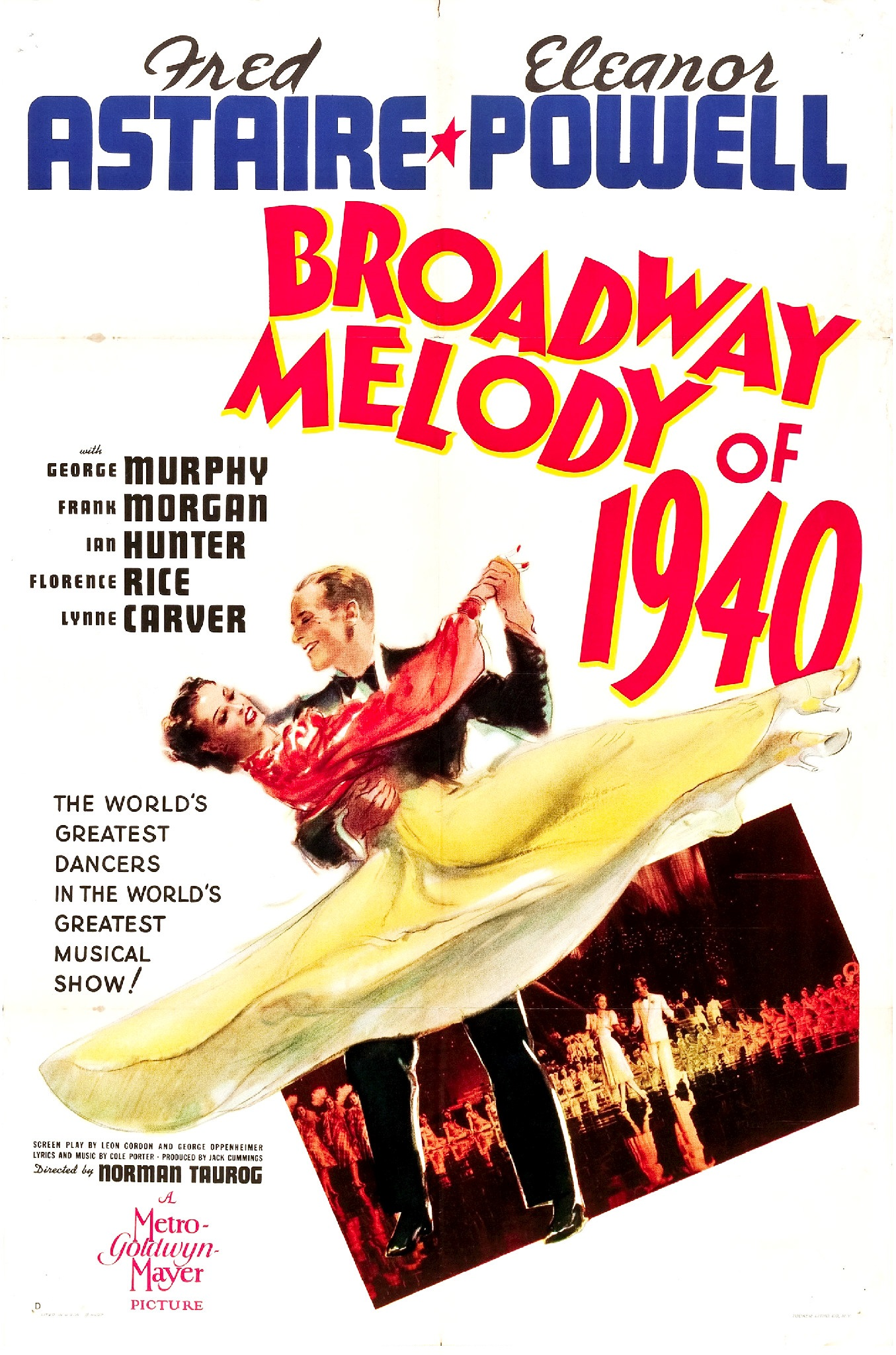
- 1940 Theatrical Poster
- Directed by: Norman Taurog
- Written by: Story: Jack McGowan; Dore Schary; Screenplay: Leon Gordon; George Oppenheimer
- Produced by: Jack Cummings
- Starring: Fred Astaire; Eleanor Powell
- Cinematography: Oliver T. Marsh; Joseph Ruttenberg
- Edited by: Blanche Sewell
- Music by: Darrell Calker; Roger Edens; Walter Ruick
- Production company: Metro-Goldwyn-Mayer
- Distributed by: Loew's, Inc
- Release date: February 9, 1940 (United States)
- Running time: 102 minutes
- Country: United States
- Language: English

Broadway Melody of 1940 is a 1940 musical film starring Fred Astaire, Eleanor Powell and George Murphy (Astaire's first male dancing partner on film). It was directed by Norman Taurog and features music by Cole Porter, including "Begin the Beguine". Metro-Goldwyn-Mayer (MGM) produced the film.

The film was the fourth and final entry in MGM's "Broadway Melody" series of films, and is notable for being the only on-screen pairing of Astaire and Powell, who were considered the finest film musical dancers of their time.

== Plot ==
Johnny Brett and King Shaw are a dance team so down on their luck that they work in a dance hall for no money. Meanwhile, Clare Bennett is a big Broadway star. Owing to a case of mistaken identity, Shaw is offered the chance to be Clare's dancing partner in a new Broadway show, when Johnny's dancing was really what producer Bob Casey saw and wanted. The partnership breaks up, but Johnny still helps out King, who lets his newfound success go to his head. Clare eventually realizes that Johnny, not King, is the better dancer, and she falls in love after having lunch with him. When Shaw gets drunk on opening night, Johnny steps in and saves the show with a brilliant performance, though he lets King think he did it himself. Clare later tells King the truth. Just before the next show, Clare discovers King drunk again, and Johnny becomes the permanent replacement. After the show, they find out that King was pretending to be drunk so that Johnny would get the job.

== Cast ==
- Fred Astaire as Johnny Brett
- Eleanor Powell as Clare Bennett
- George Murphy as King Shaw
- Frank Morgan as Bob Casey
- Ian Hunter as Bert C. Matthews
- Florence Rice as Amy Blake, Casey's Secretary
- Lynne Carver as Emmy Lou Lee
- Ann Morriss as Pearl Delonge
- Trixie Firschke as Juggler
- Herman Bing as Silhouettist (uncredited)

Cast notes:

- Mel Blanc appears, uncredited, as a panhandler.

== Musical numbers ==
- "Please Don't Monkey with Broadway" - words and music by Cole Porter, sung and danced by Fred Astaire and George Murphy
- "All Ashore" - words and music by Roger Edens, sung by Eleanor Powell, one of the few times she was ever shown singing with her own voice rather than being overdubbed.
- "Between You and Me" - words and music by Cole Porter, sung by George Murphy, danced by Murphy and Eleanor Powell
- "I've Got My Eyes on You" - words and music by Cole Porter, sung and danced by Fred Astaire
- "Jukebox Dance" - words and music by Walter Ruick, danced by Eleanor Powell and Fred Astaire. Powell later said this number was her favorite out of all her filmed dances.
- "I Concentrate on You" - words and music by Cole Porter, sung by Douglas McPhail, danced by Eleanor Powell and Fred Astaire
- "Begin the Beguine" - words and music by Cole Porter, sung in two styles as part of the final musical piece in the film. The song is first sung in dramatic style by mezzo-soprano Lois Hodnott (who was used to dub Carmen D'Antonio) on a "tropical" set, with Powell, joined by Astaire dancing in side-by-side, their choreography drawing heavily on flamenco dance. Later, after it is sung in what was then contemporary jazz style by The Music Maids, Astaire and Powell tap dance to a big band accompaniment; the sequence includes a passage in which they tap dance with no musical accompaniment. The big-band/jazz segment was featured in the 1974 documentary That's Entertainment!, which noted in the narration that this dance was the last of MGM's big black-and-white production numbers.
- "I've Got My Eyes on You" (instrumental and choral reprise) - danced by Fred Astaire, Eleanor Powell and George Murphy
- "Il bacio" with music by Luigi Arditi and lyrics by Gottardo Aldighieri was performed by Charlotte Arren (uncredited) in the movie as a parody of opera singers.

== Production ==
Broadway Melody of 1940 was based on a story by Jack McGowan and Dore Schary. Schary would go on to be head of production (1948) and then president (1951) of MGM until 1956. The film was originally planned to be shot in Technicolor, but because of the unsettled state of Europe due to World War II, MGM decided to stick to black and white.

The film was the fourth and final entry in MGM's loosely connected Broadway Melody series, which began with the original The Broadway Melody released in 1929, and was followed by Broadway Melody of 1936 and Broadway Melody of 1938. The films were unconnected except for the use of the song "Broadway Melody" (the 1940 entry did not feature the number, although a bit of it can be heard over the film's opening credits), and the fact that Powell starred in the 1936, 1938 and 1940 entries, playing different roles in each. A fifth Broadway Melody film was planned for release in the early 1940s, pairing Eleanor Powell with Gene Kelly, but production was cancelled at the rehearsal stage. Another production was to have been called Broadway Melody of 1944 but was instead renamed Broadway Rhythm. The 1940 entry is considered Powell's last major successful film, as she would go on to appear in a succession of only moderate hits before retiring from the screen several years later. It has the distinction of being the first non-documentary film featuring Powell to be released on DVD.

Fred Astaire had just left RKO, and Broadway Melody of 1940 was his first film for MGM since his small part in 1933's Dancing Lady. Astaire was reportedly slightly intimidated by Powell because she was considered one of the few female dancers capable of out-performing Astaire. According to Powell in her introduction to the book, The MGM Story, the feeling was somewhat mutual. Powell recalled finally saying to Astaire, "Look, we can't go on like this. I'm Ellie; you're Fred. We're just two hoofers," after which, they got along well, and rehearsed so much they wore out their pianist.

Broadway Melody of 1940 was in production from early September until late November 1939. The set for the "Begin the Beguine" number cost $120,000 to construct. It utilized a sixty-foot multi-paneled mirror mounted on a revolving track to change backgrounds.

The film is alluded to in satirist Tom Lehrer's song "George Murphy", about the dancer becoming a United States senator:

Think of all the musicals we have in store,
Imagine: Broadway Melody of Nineteen Eighty-Four.

== Accolades ==
"Begin the Beguine" was nominated for the American Film Institute's 2004 list AFI's 100 Years...100 Songs, while the film was nominated for the 2006 AFI's Greatest Movie Musicals.
