= Meet the People =

1944 film by Charles Reisner

- Directed by: Charles Reisner
- Screenplay by: Sig Herzig; Fred Saidy; Virginia Kellog (add'l contribs, uncredited)
- Based on: Meet the People; 1940 play by Sol and Ben Barzman and Louis Lant
- Produced by: E.Y. Harburg
- Starring: Lucille Ball; Dick Powell
- Cinematography: Robert L. Surtees
- Edited by: Alex Troffey
- Music by: Songs: Sammy Fain (music); E.Y. Harburg (lyrics) et al.
- Production company: Metro-Goldwyn-Mayer
- Distributed by: Loew's Inc.
- Release dates: June 1, 1944 (Los Angeles); September 7, 1944 (New York City)
- Running time: 90 minutes
- Country: United States
- Language: English
- Budget: $1,302,000
- Box office: $960,000

Meet the People (1944) is a Metro-Goldwyn-Mayer musical comedy film made, and set, during World War II, and starring Lucille Ball and Dick Powell and featuring Virginia O'Brien, Bert Lahr, Rags Ragland and June Allyson. The film takes its title from a successful Los Angeles musical revue, which ran on Broadway from December 25, 1940, to May 10, 1941. Vaughn Monroe and his orchestra, Spike Jones and his City Slickers, and Virginia O'Brien were also in the original stage cast. O'Brien sings the hit song "Say That We're Sweethearts Again".

== Plot ==
Welder William "Swanee" Swanson works at a shipyard in Morganville, Delaware. One day he sees the brightly shining Broadway star Julie Hampton speak in front of a crowd of workers at the yard, and he instantly falls in love with her.

Luckily enough, Julie has promised to go on a date with the man who sells the most war bonds within a certain time limit. Swanee lies to Julie and tells her that he has $7,500 in pledges. He also tells the workers that Julie will kiss every worker who makes additional pledges to him. The crowd goes wild with excitement, and Swanee easily wins the prize.

Swanee drives Julie up to the romantic Inspiration Point in his old car, trying to impress her. He also tells her about the musical he has written together with his cousin John, a U.S.M.C. It is about working men, and he even performs the theme love song for her. He calls the musical "Meet the People". She is impressed enough to show the musical screenplay to a Broadway producer, Monte Rowland, and the producer agrees to stage the play on the condition that he can use old costumes from previous shows.

When the show is rehearsed, Swanee discovers that all the roles have glittery showbiz costumes, and the actors don't look the least like working men. He is disappointed, and demands the costumes to be altered. Monte refuses and cancels the show, hoping that Swanee will surrender and give in.

But he doesn't. Instead he leaves New York in anger, denounces Julie and the showbiz industry, and goes back to Morganville. Julie follows him there, determined to make him change his mind. She starts working at the shipyard as a welder, and finds out that she enjoys the work very much. She also makes a lot of new friends among her colleagues, who are eager to get to know the beautiful star.

Julie continues dating Swanee, and she tells him about her motive for coming with him. She wants to change the show, and hire some out-of-work chorus friends of hers to be on stage. Swanee likes the idea, and signs a new deal with Monte. But then he sees Julie posing for promotional photographs in her working outfit, and thinks she makes a mockery of him and his co-workers. He calls her egotistic and refuses to go through with the plans.

Julie doesn't give up. During a pep talk speech to her co-workers at the shipyard, she leaves the microphone on behind the stage, and gets Swanee to confess his feelings for her. Everyone at the shipyard hears his words, and he is laughed at and ridiculed by his colleagues. Swanee calls Julie a hypocrite and storms away.

A problem arises when John is on his way home from the service, because Swanee's uncle Felix has told John that the show he helped write is a hit on Broadway. Swanee has to produce the show somehow, and comes up with the idea to make it on the yard's 300th finished ship anniversary. But Julie refuses to take part, since she is determined on doing a show on her own, with the help of her friends from Broadway.

John is disappointed when he arrives and learns the truth about the fate of "Meet the People". When Julie sees the disappointment in his eyes, she changes her mind and starts casting for the musical anyway. She and John stage and rehearse the musical while Swanee, unaware of their preparations, is away looking for funds to back up the musical. When he returns to find the musical is opening, he is delighted and impressed with Julie's work. Julie tells Swanee that she loves him, and they become a couple on stage in time for the musical's grand finale.

== Cast ==
- Lucille Ball as Julie Hampton
- Dick Powell as William "Swanee" Swanson
- Virginia O'Brien as "Woodpecker" Peg
- Bert Lahr as The Commander
- Rags Ragland as "Smitty" Smith
- June Allyson as Annie
- Steven Geray as Uncle Felix
- Paul Regan as "Buck"
- Howard Freeman as George Peetwick
- Betty Jaynes as Steffi
- John Craven as John Swanson
- Morris Ankrum as Monte Rowland
- Ziggie Talent as Ziggie
- Mata and Hari as oriental dancers
- Vaughn Monroe and His Orchestra as themselves
- Spike Jones and His City Slickers as themselves

Cast notes:

- Lucille Ball's singing voice was provided by Gloria Grafton.

== Soundtrack ==
1. "I Can't Dance (I Got Ants in My Pants)" (music by Clarence Williams, lyrics by Charlie Gaines) - Sung and danced by Ziggie Talent with Vaughn Monroe and His Orchestra
2. "In Times Like These" (music by Sammy Fain, lyrics by Yip Harburg) - Sung by Dick Powell and Lucille Ball (dubbed by Gloria Grafton)
3. "Der Fuehrer's Face" (by Oliver Wallace) - Performed by Spike Jones and His City Slickers
4. "Meet the People" (music by Jay Gorney, lyric by Henry Myers) - Sung by Dick Powell and chorus in his daydream
5. "Meet the People" (reprise 1) - Sung by Lucille Ball (dubbed by Gloria Grafton) and chorus
6. "Acrobatic Dance Music" - Danced by Miriam LaVelle
7. "Shicklegruber" (music by Sammy Fain, lyrics by Yip Harburg) - Performed by Spike Jones and His City Slickers
8. "Piano Instrumental" - Played on piano by Richard Hall
9. "Heave Ho! ... Let the Wind Blow" (music by Harold Arlen, lyrics by Yip Harburg) - Sung by Bert Lahr and ensemble
10. "In Times Like These" (reprise) - Performed by Vaughn Monroe and His Orchestra and sung by Vaughn Monroe
11. "I Like to Recognize the Tune" (music by Richard Rodgers, lyrics by Lorenz Hart) - Sung and performed by June Allyson, Virginia O'Brien, Ziggie Talent, Vaughn Monroe, The King Sisters and others, played by Vaughn Monroe and His Orchestra
12. "Oriental Music" - Danced by Mata and Hari
13. "Say That We're Sweethearts Again" (by Earl K. Brent) - Sung by Virginia O'Brien
14. "Smart to Be People" (music by Burton Lane, lyrics by Yip Harburg) - Sung and danced by Lucille Ball (dubbed by Gloria Grafton), Dick Powell, Virginia O'Brien, June Allyson and chorus
15. "Meet the People" (second reprise) - Sung by chorus

== Box office ==
According to MGM records, the film earned $670,000 in the U.S. and Canada, and $290,000 in other markets, resulting in a net loss of $717,000.

== In popular culture ==
"Say That We're Sweethearts Again" was sung by Harley Quinn in the Batman: The Animated Series episode "Harlequinade".
