= Eleanor Powell =

American tap dancer and actress (1912–1982)

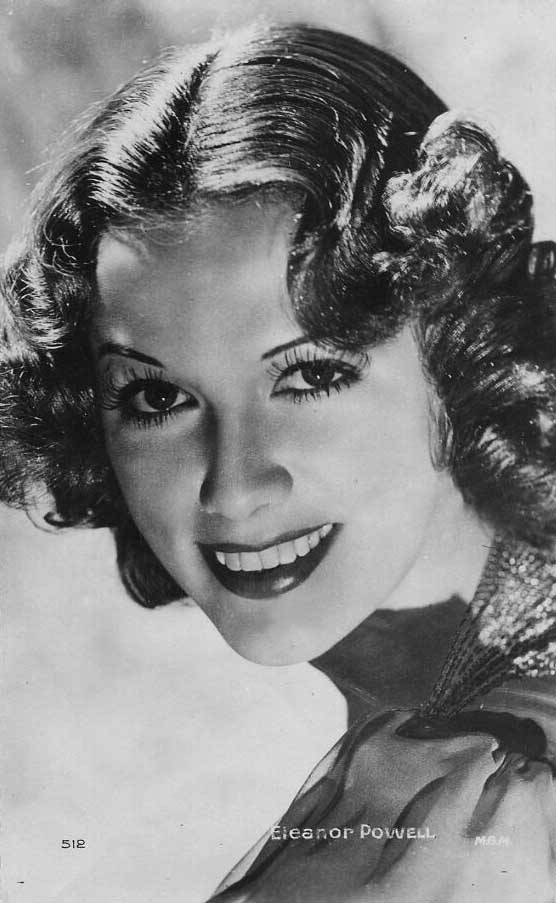
- 1930s publicity photo
- Born: Eleanor Torrey Powell; November 21, 1912; Springfield, Massachusetts, U.S.
- Died: February 11, 1982 (aged 69); Beverly Hills, California, U.S.
- Resting place: Hollywood Forever Cemetery
- Occupations: Dancer, actress
- Years active: 1928–1955
- Spouse: Glenn Ford (m. 1943; div. 1959)
- Children: Peter Ford

Eleanor Torrey Powell (November 21, 1912 – February 11, 1982) was an American dancer and actress. Best remembered for her tap dance numbers in musical films in the 1930s and 1940s, she was one of Metro-Goldwyn-Mayer's top dancing stars during the Golden Age of Hollywood. Powell appeared in vaudeville, on Broadway, and most prominently, in a series of movie musical vehicles tailored especially to showcase her dance talents, including Born to Dance (1936), Broadway Melody of 1938 (1937), Rosalie (1937), and Broadway Melody of 1940 (1940). She retired from films in the mid-1940s, but resurfaced for the occasional specialty dance scene in films such as Thousands Cheer. In the 1950s, she hosted a Christian children's TV show and eventually headlined a successful nightclub act in Las Vegas. She died from cancer at 69. Powell is known as one of the most versatile and athletic female dancers of the Hollywood studio era.

== Early life ==
Powell was born in Springfield, Massachusetts, to Clarence Gardner Powell and Blanche Torrey Powell. Her parents divorced when she was 11 months old. She was raised by her mother with the help of her maternal grandparents (who also lived with them). She was a painfully shy child, not even able to greet guests who came to her family’s home.

== Introduction to dance ==
Powell's mother, Blanche, sent Eleanor to dance lessons at age 11, in hopes that it would combat her shyness. She trained locally with Ralph McKernan (also the teacher of dancer/choreographer Robert Alton) in classical ballet and "interpretive" modern dance. Powell also trained extensively in acrobatics. She immediately showed a natural aptitude for movement and was discovered by Gus Edwards (of the Vaudeville Kiddie Review) while performing acrobatics on a beach in Atlantic City, New Jersey. She subsequently began working her first paid gigs for Edwards at the age of 12, during her summer holidays. Powell's first gig was in Atlantic City at the Ritz Grill, located in the Ambassador Hotel. She performed an acrobatic "specialty" act and was by no means a star in the show; however, her consistently favorable reviews led to other paid performance opportunities, and eventually, more featured spots. Jack Benny and Eddie Cantor, who frequented Atlantic City and saw her perform, and her teacher, McKernan, are credited with having suggested to Powell that she set her sights on Broadway.

== New York City: introduction to tap ==
In 1927, Powell took a break from her schooling and moved with her mother to New York City. She was signed by William Grady at the William Morris Agency, and although she managed to book jobs almost immediately dancing in clubs, vaudeville, and at private parties, her acrobatic specialty that had impressed in Atlantic City was not enough for a career on Broadway. Realizing that to be marketable as a dancer on Broadway at that time, one had to be able to tap dance, Powell began a package of 10 tap lessons at a school run by Jack Donahue and Johnny Boyle – these lessons were the only formal tap training she would ever have. Powell disliked tap at first and had to be coaxed to return after her first lesson. She is quoted as saying, "in about the seventh lesson, it all came together. Just like an algebra problem – you have a tutor teaching you and all of a sudden you say, 'oh, now I see!'".

In training Powell, Donohue and Boyle used an unconventional method; to counteract her tendency toward pulling away from the floor and working through her feet, as one does in classical ballet and acrobatics, they had her wear an army-surplus belt during her lessons, which had one sandbag attached on either side. This was intended to weigh her down, help her to feel the floor in a different way, and engage with it – to "play" the floor as if it were an instrument. This not only served to help Powell "find her legs" in tap dance, it also was to be a catalyst in the development of her uniquely grounded and smooth tap style.

Powell, now 16 years of age, booked tour on the vaudeville circuit, where she shared a bill with, among others, the renowned tap dance duo Buck and Bubbles. She was strongly influenced by John "Bubbles" Sublett in particular, who was a highly inventive and creative tap dancer. Hailed as the "Father of Rhythm Tap," he is known for bringing tap dance down into the heels, and incorporating unexpected rhythms that broke out of the more predictable meter of the time. Bill "Bojangles" Robinson had popularized an extremely Irish-influenced tap style, barely leaving the balls of his feet – it was bouncy and buoyant. Powell and he performed together at private parties in palatial homes of New York's high society and in exclusive elite clubs in New York City during the late 1920s, collaborating on choreography for these events; they could earn as much as $500 per night. During these private shows, Robinson mentored Powell, teaching her his signature Stair Dance. Sublett "got down into the floor" and his style and inventiveness were a huge inspiration to Eleanor, who had recently "found the floor" herself. Powell named John "Bubbles" Sublett as one of her main influences, and it shows in her grounded, syncopated footwork (what is now thought of as "hoofing", though in that era, hoofing really referred to any vaudeville tap act, tap improviser, or tapping chorus member, and hoofers did not use their arms, instead dancing from the waist down and letting their upper bodies stay free and loose).

== Dance style ==
Eleanor Powell developed a dance style that fused her ballet and acrobatic abilities with her grounded taps. She moved smoothly and effortlessly through fast, complex footwork, barely leaving the floor, even to perform tap steps that take place while airborne, such as double pullbacks (sometimes tapping in a "hoofing" style, with natural, loose arms, and other times with a more technical, placed port de bras). This was contrasted with energetic turn sequences, high-flying, buoyant leaps, such as grand jeté en tourants, and grande battements, which further showed her technique and flexibility. She incorporated hula dancing for the film Honolulu, which then infiltrated her choreography for years to come.

== Broadway ==
When she was 17, she brought her graceful, athletic style to Broadway, where she starred in various revues and musicals, including Follow Thru (1929), which represented her first Broadway success, Fine and Dandy (1930), and At Home Abroad (1935). During this time, she was dubbed "the world's greatest female tap dancer" due to her machine-gun footwork. In the early 1930s, she appeared as a chorus girl in a few early minor musical films.

== Road to Hollywood ==
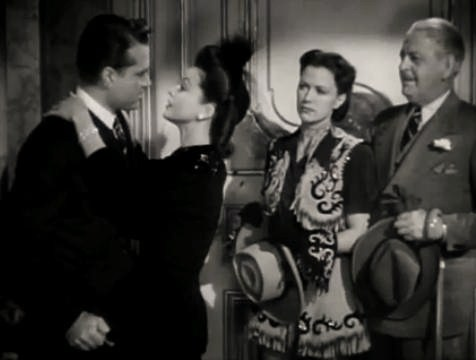
Red Skelton and Eleanor Powell in I Dood It (1943)

In 1935, Powell made the move to Hollywood, appearing for the first time in George White's 1935 Scandals, produced by Fox. She subsequently signed a contract with Metro-Goldwyn-Mayer (MGM).

== Film stardom ==
Powell was well received in her first starring role in 1935 in George White's Scandals. According to dancer Ann Miller, quoted in the "making-of" documentary That's Entertainment! III, MGM was headed for bankruptcy in the late 1930s, but the films of Eleanor Powell, particularly Broadway Melody of 1936, were so popular that they made the company profitable again. Miller also credits Powell for inspiring her own dancing career, which would lead her to become an MGM musical star a decade later.

Powell went on to star opposite many of the decade's top leading men, including James Stewart, Robert Taylor, Fred Astaire, George Murphy, Nelson Eddy, and Robert Young. Among the films she made during the height of her career in the mid- to late 1930s were Born to Dance (1936), Rosalie (1937), Broadway Melody of 1938 (1937), Honolulu (1939), and Broadway Melody of 1940 (1940). All of these movies featured her amazing solo tapping, although her increasingly huge production numbers began to draw criticism. Her characters also sang, but Powell's singing voice was usually (but not always) dubbed. (This would also happen to one of Powell's successors, Cyd Charisse.) Broadway Melody of 1940, in which Powell starred opposite Fred Astaire, featured an acclaimed musical score by Cole Porter.

Together, Astaire and Powell danced to Porter's "Begin the Beguine", which is considered by many to be one of the greatest tap sequences in film history. According to accounts of the making of this film, including a documentary included on the DVD release, Astaire was somewhat intimidated by Powell, who was considered the only female dancer ever capable of out-dancing Astaire. In his autobiography Steps in Time (1959), Astaire remarked, "She 'put 'em down like a man', no ricky-ticky-sissy stuff with Ellie. She really knocked out a tap dance in a class by herself." In his introduction to the clip, featured in That's Entertainment, Frank Sinatra said, "You know, you can wait around and hope, but I tell ya, you'll never see the likes of this again."

== Decline in popularity ==
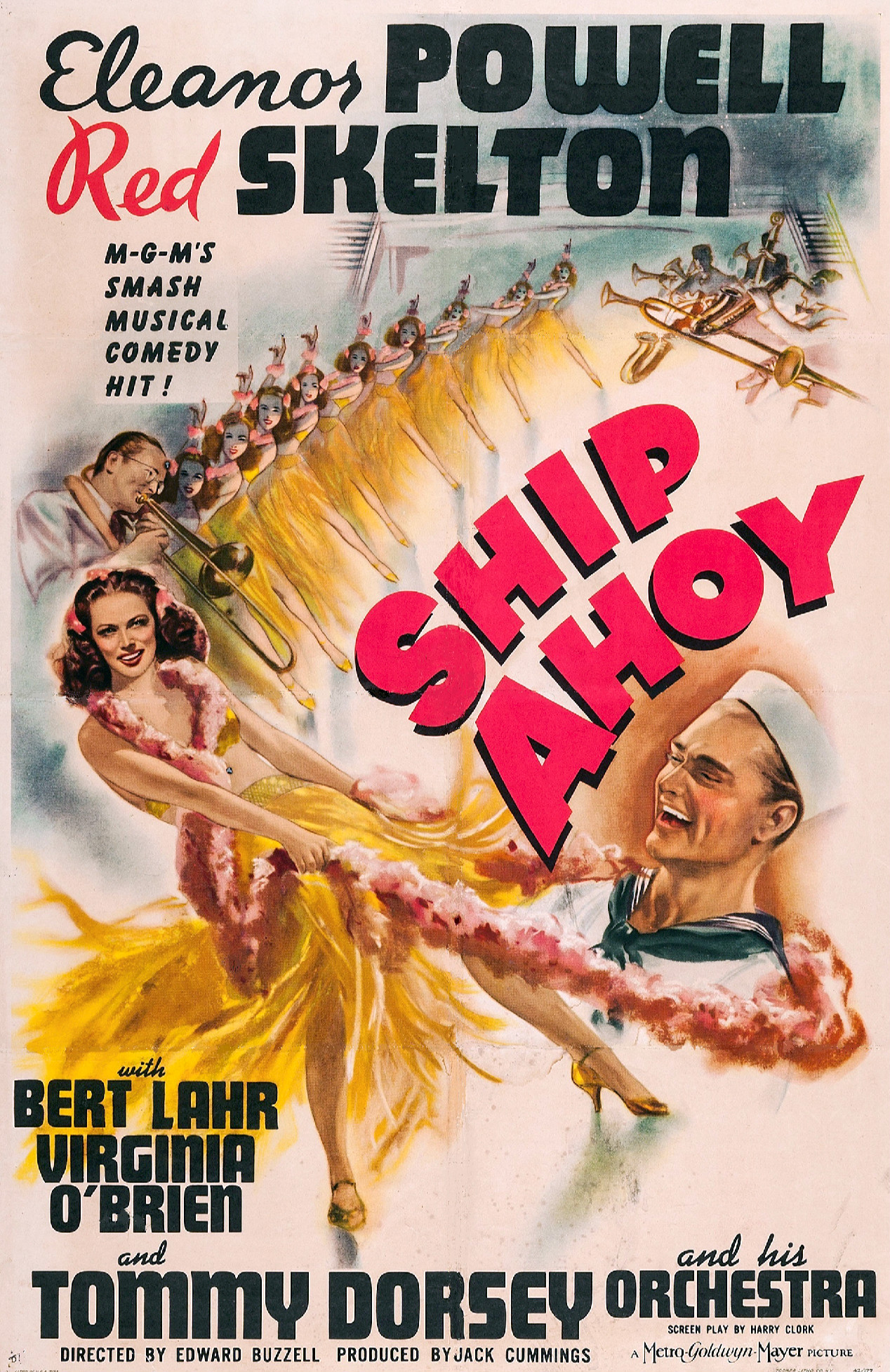
Ship Ahoy poster, 1942

Following Broadway Melody of 1940, Powell was sidelined for many months following a gallstone operation, and things changed somewhat for the worse, at least as far as Powell's movie career was concerned. Lady Be Good (1941) gave Powell top billing and a classic dance routine to "Fascinatin' Rhythm", but the main stars were Ann Sothern and Robert Young. Ship Ahoy (1942) and I Dood It (1943), in which Powell starred with Red Skelton, are considered lesser efforts, although in the former, her character played a central role in the story, and Powell's dance skills were put to practical use when she managed to tap out a Morse code message to a secret agent in the middle of a dance routine. In another routine from Ship Ahoy, she danced to the Tommy Dorsey Orchestra with Buddy Rich on drums, and the two performed a great musical partnership with the number "Tallulah". She was signed to play opposite Dan Dailey in For Me and My Gal in 1942, but the two actors were removed from the picture during rehearsals and replaced by Gene Kelly and Judy Garland. Later, production of a new Broadway Melody film that would have paired Powell with Kelly was also cancelled.

Powell parted with MGM in 1943 after her next film, Thousands Cheer, in which she appeared only for a few minutes to perform a specialty number (as part of an all-star cast), and the same year married actor Glenn Ford. She danced in a giant pinball machine in Sensations of 1945 (1944) for United Artists, but the film was a critical and commercial disappointment. Her performance was overshadowed by what was to be the final film appearance of W. C. Fields. She then retired to concentrate on raising her son, Peter Ford, who was born that year. She appeared in a few documentary-style short subjects about celebrities in the late 1940s. Overseas audiences saw one additional Powell dance performance in 1946,but the compilation The Great Morgan included a number that had been cut from Honolulu.

In 1950, Powell returned to MGM one last time in Duchess of Idaho, starring Esther Williams. Appearing as herself in a nightclub scene, a hesitant Powell is invited to dance by bandleader Dick Layne (Van Johnson). She begins with a staid, almost balletic performance, until she is chided by Layne for being lazy. She then strips off her skirt, revealing her famous legs, and performs a "boogie-woogie"-style specialty number very similar to the one she performed in Thousands Cheer seven years earlier. Williams, in her autobiography The Million Dollar Mermaid, writes of being touched, watching Powell rehearsing until her feet bled, just to make her brief appearance as perfect as possible.

== Later career: TV and stage ==
After Duchess of Idaho, Powell returned to private life. In May 1952, she emerged as a guest star on an episode of All Star Revue with Danny Thomas and June Havoc. Around this time, she was ordained a minister of the Unity Church and later hosted an Emmy Award-winning Sunday morning TV program for youth entitled The Faith of Our Children (1953–1955). Her son, Peter Ford, was a regular on this show and later found his own success as a rock-and-roll singer and as an actor. In 1955, Powell made her last film appearance when she appeared in Have Faith in Our Children, a three-minute short film produced for the Variety Club of Northern California in which Powell asked viewers to donate to the charity. The short, which other than its title, had no relation to the TV series, marked the only time Powell appeared on screen with Glenn Ford.

Powell divorced Ford in 1959, and that year, encouraged by Peter, launched a highly publicized nightclub career, including performances in Las Vegas and appearances at Lou Walters' Latin Quarter in Boston. The athleticism which characterized her dance style remained with her well into middle age. Her live performances continued well into the 1960s. During the early 1960s, she made several guest appearances on variety TV programs, including The Ed Sullivan Show and The Hollywood Palace. She made her final public appearance in 1981 at a televised American Film Institute tribute to Fred Astaire, where she received a standing ovation.

Powell died February 11, 1982, of ovarian cancer, aged 69.

== Reintroduction ==
Powell was reintroduced to audiences in the popular That's Entertainment! documentary in 1974, and its sequels That's Entertainment, Part II (1976) and That's Entertainment! III (1994) and the related film That's Dancing! (1985) which spotlight her dancing from films such as Broadway Melody of 1940, Lady Be Good, and Born to Dance. She is one of only a few performers to be the subject of spotlight segments (as opposed to being included in a montage with other performers) in all four films. That's Entertainment! III is notable for including behind-the-scenes footage of her "Fascinatin' Rhythm" routine from Lady Be Good.

Powell's films continue to be broadcast on television regularly by Turner Classic Movies, with most released in the VHS video format in 1980s and 1990s. North American DVD release of her work has been slower in coming. Aside from clips from her films being included in the aforementioned That's Entertainment! trilogy, plus clips that were featured in other releases such as the 2002 special-edition DVD release of Singin' in the Rain, a complete Powell film was not released until the 2003 DVD release of Broadway Melody of 1940. In February 2007, Warner Home Video announced plans to release a boxed DVD set of Eleanor Powell's musical films by year end. This did not occur; instead, on April 8, 2008, Warner Bros. released a third boxed set in the Classic Musicals from the Dream Factory series, with nine films, four of which star Powell: Broadway Melody of 1936, Born to Dance, Broadway Melody of 1938, and Lady Be Good. The films are expected to be released in individual two-film sets (the two Broadway Melody films in one set, Born to Dance/Lady Be Good on the other) later in the year. Since 2007, several other Powell films have emerged on DVD, including Rosalie, I Dood It (1943), and Sensations of 1945 (1945).

== Filmography ==
=== Features ===
- Queen High (1930)
- George White's 1935 Scandals (1935)
- Broadway Melody of 1936 (1935) as Irene Foster
- Born to Dance (1936)
- Broadway Melody of 1938 (1937) as Sally Lee
- Rosalie (1937)
- Honolulu (1939)
- Broadway Melody of 1940 (1940)
- Lady Be Good (1941)
- Ship Ahoy (1942)
- Thousands Cheer (1943)
- I Dood It (1943)
- Sensations of 1945 (1944)
- Duchess of Idaho (1950)

=== Short films ===
- Screen Snapshots Series 15, No. 12 (1936)
- Screen Snapshots: Famous Hollywood Mothers (1947)
- Screen Snapshots: Hollywood Holiday (1948)
- Have Faith in Our Children (1955)

== See also ==
- List of dancers
