= List of musical films by year =

The following is a list of musical films by year. A musical film is a film genre in which songs sung by the characters are interwoven into the narrative, sometimes accompanied by dancing. Unless otherwise specified, these films are in English.

== 1920s ==
=== 1927 ===
- The Jazz Singer

=== 1928 ===
- My Man
- The Singing Fool

=== 1929 ===
- A Song of Kentucky
- Applause
- The Battle of Paris
- Blaze o' Glory
- Broadway
- Broadway Babies
- The Broadway Hoofer
- The Broadway Melody
- Broadway Scandals
- Close Harmony
- The Cock-Eyed World
- The Cocoanuts
- Dance Hall
- The Dance of Life
- The Desert Song
- Devil-May-Care
- Footlights and Fools
- The Forward Pass
- Fox Movietone Follies of 1929
- Glorifying the American Girl
- Gold Diggers of Broadway
- The Great Gabbo
- Hallelujah
- Happy Days
- Hearts in Dixie
- The Hollywood Revue of 1929
- Honky Tonk
- Hot for Paris
- Howdy Broadway
- Innocents of Paris
- Is Everybody Happy?
- It's a Great Life
- Jailhouse Blues (short)
- Little Johnny Jones
- Love at First Sight
- The Love Parade
- Lucky Boy
- Lucky in Love
- Marianne
- Married In Hollywood
- Melody Lane
- Melody of the Heart
- Mother's Boy
- On with the Show
- The Painted Angel
- Paris
- Pointed Heels
- Queen of the Night Clubs
- The Rainbow Man
- Red Hot Rhythm
- Rio Rita
- Sally
- Say It with Songs
- Show Boat
- The Show of Shows
- Smiling Irish Eyes
- So Long Letty
- So This Is College
- Song of Love
- St. Louis Blues (short)
- Street Girl
- Sunnyside Up
- Sweetie
- Syncopation
- Tanned Legs
- The Time, the Place and the Girl
- The Vagabond Lover
- Why Bring That Up?
- Why Leave Home?
- Words and Music

== 1930s ==
=== 1930 ===
- Adiós Argentina (Spanish)
- Animal Crackers
- Are You There?
- Babes in Toyland (unreleased)
- Be Yourself!
- Big Boy
- The Big Party
- The Big Pond
- Bride of the Regiment
- Bright Lights
- Call of the Flesh
- Cameo Kirby
- Captain of the Guard
- Chasing Rainbows
- Check and Double Check
- Cheer Up and Smile
- Children of Pleasure
- The Cuckoos
- Dangerous Nan McGrew
- Dixiana
- The Florodora Girl
- Follow the Leader
- Follow Thru
- Free and Easy
- The Golden Calf
- Golden Dawn
- Good News
- The Grand Parade
- Great Day (unreleased)
- Half Shot at Sunrise
- Heads Up
- Heart of the Rockies (unreleased)
- High Society Blues
- Hit the Deck
- Hold Everything
- Honey
- In Gay Madrid
- Just Imagine
- King of Jazz
- Kismet
- A Lady's Morals
- Leathernecking
- Let's Go Native
- Let's Go Places
- Lilies of the Field
- The Life of the Party
- Lord Byron of Broadway
- The Lottery Bride
- Love Among the Millionaires
- Love Comes Along
- Love in the Rough
- Madam Satan
- Man Trouble
- Mammy
- The March of Time (unreleased)
- Maybe It's Love
- Montana Moon
- Monte Carlo
- New Moon
- New Movietone Follies of 1930
- No, No, Nanette
- Oh, For a Man!
- Oh Sailor Behave!
- One Mad Kiss
- Pardon My Gun
- Paramount on Parade
- Playboy of Paris
- Puttin' on the Ritz
- Queen High
- Roadhouse Nights
- Reaching for the Moon
- The Rogue Song
- Safety in Numbers
- The Sap from Syracuse
- She Couldn't Say No
- Showgirl in Hollywood
- Song o' My Heart
- Song of the Flame
- Song of the West
- Soup to Nuts
- Spring Is Here
- Sunny
- Sunny Skies
- Sweet Kitty Bellairs
- Swing High
- They Learned About Women
- Top Speed
- Under a Texas Moon
- Under Suspicion
- The Vagabond King
- Viennese Nights
- Whoopee!
- Women Everywhere
- Young Man of Manhattan

=== 1931 ===
- Caught Plastered
- Children of Dreams
- Cracked Nuts
- The Cuban Love Song
- Delicious
- Fifty Million Frenchmen
- Flying High
- Gold Dust Gertie
- Her Majesty, Love
- Honeymoon Lane
- The Hot Heiress
- Kiss Me Again
- Le Million
- Manhattan Parade
- Men of the Sky
- No Limit
- One Heavenly Night
- Palmy Days
- Pardon Us
- Peach O'Reno
- The Prodigal
- Sally in Our Alley
- The Smiling Lieutenant

=== 1932 ===
- The Big Broadcast
- Blondie of the Follies
- Crooner
- Dancers in the Dark
- Girl Crazy
- The Girl from Calgary
- Goodnight, Vienna
- Horse Feathers
- The Kid from Spain
- Looking on the Bright Side
- Love Me Tonight
- Odds 777
- One Hour with You
- The Phantom President
- This is the Night

=== 1933 ===
- 42nd Street
- A Bedtime Story
- Beer and Pretzels (short)
- Broadway Thru a Keyhole
- Broadway to Hollywood
- Dancing Lady
- The Devil's Brother
- Diplomaniacs
- Duck Soup
- Flying Down to Rio
- Footlight Parade
- Going Hollywood
- Gold Diggers of 1933
- The Good Companions
- Hallelujah, I'm a Bum
- Hello Pop! (short)
- It's Great to Be Alive
- Melody Cruise
- Moonlight and Pretzels
- My Weakness
- Nertsery Rhymes (short)
- Plane Nuts (short)
- Roamin' Thru the Roses (short)
- Roman Scandals
- She Done Him Wrong
- Sitting Pretty
- So This Is Africa
- The Sweetheart of Sigma Chi
- Take a Chance
- Too Much Harmony
- Torch Singer
- Umpa (short)

=== 1934 ===
- 365 Nights in Hollywood
- Ayer y Hoy
- Babes in Toyland
- The Big Idea (short)
- Bright Eyes
- Cab Calloway's Hi-De-Ho
- Caravan
- The Cat and the Fiddle
- Cockeyed Cavaliers
- Dames
- Down to Their Last Yacht
- Evergreen
- Fashions of 1934
- Flirtation Walk
- The Gay Divorcee
- Gay Love
- George White's Scandals
- Happiness Ahead
- Harold Teen
- Here is My Heart
- Hips, Hips, Hooray!
- Hollywood Here We Come (short)
- Hollywood Party
- I Like It That Way
- Idols of the Radio
- Jolly Fellows (Russian)
- Kentucky Kernels
- Kid Millions
- King Kelly of the U.S.A.
- Little Miss Marker
- Love Detectives (short)
- Love, Life and Laughter
- Melody in Spring
- The Merry Widow
- Mike Fright (short)
- Moulin Rouge
- Murder at the Vanities
- Music in the Air
- Now and Forever
- One Night of Love
- School For Romance (short)
- She Loves Me Not
- Shoot the Works
- Sing as We Go
- Stand Up and Cheer!
- Strictly Dynamite
- Student Tour
- Susie's Affairs (short)
- Sweet Adeline
- Transatlantic Merry-Go-Round
- Tripping Through the Tropics (short)
- Twenty Million Sweethearts
- We're Not Dressing
- When Do We Eat? (short)
- Woman Haters (short)
- Wonder Bar

=== 1935 ===
- Amphitryon
- Beginner's Luck (short)
- The Big Broadcast of 1936
- Broadway Gondolier
- Broadway Hostess
- Broadway Melody of 1936
- Cab Calloway's Jitterbug Party
- Coronado
- Curly Top
- Dizzy Dames
- Every Night at Eight
- First a Girl
- George White's 1935 Scandals
- The Girl Friend
- Go Into Your Dance
- Gold Diggers of 1935
- Harmony Lane
- Here Comes the Band
- Hooray for Love
- I Dream Too Much
- I Live for Love
- The Little Colonel
- The Littlest Rebel
- Love Me Forever
- Melody Trail
- Metropolitan
- A Midsummer Night's Dream
- Mississippi
- Music Is Magic
- Naughty Marietta
- A Night at the Opera
- The Night Is Young
- The Nitwits
- The Old Homestead
- Old Man Rhythm
- Our Gang Follies of 1936 (short)
- Puente Alsina
- The Rainmakers
- Reckless
- Redheads on Parade
- Roberta
- The Sagebrush Troubadour
- Ship Cafe
- Shipmates Forever
- The Soul of the Bandoneon
- Stars Over Broadway
- Stolen Harmony
- Sweet Surrender
- Thanks a Million
- To Beat the Band
- Top Hat
- Two for Tonight

=== 1936 ===
- Anything Goes
- The Big Broadcast of 1937
- The Bohemian Girl
- Born to Dance
- Cain and Mabel
- Can This Be Dixie?
- Canillita
- Captain January
- Circus (Russian)
- College Holiday
- Collegiate
- The Devil on Horseback
- Dimples
- Follow the Fleet
- Follow Your Heart
- Frankie and Johnnie
- The Gay Desperado
- Gold Diggers of 1937
- The Great Ziegfeld
- Hats Off
- Hearts Divided
- Help Me To Live
- Land Without Music
- Let's Sing Again
- King of Burlesque
- The King Steps Out
- Klondike Annie
- One in a Million
- Paddy O'Day
- Pennies from Heaven
- Pigskin Parade
- The Pinch Singer (short)
- Poor Little Rich Girl
- Rhythm on the Range
- Rose of the Rancho
- Rose Marie
- San Francisco
- Show Boat
- Silly Billies
- Sing, Baby, Sing
- Sing Me a Love Song
- The Singing Kid
- Sitting on the Moon
- Song and Dance Man
- Stage Struck
- Stars on Parade
- Stowaway
- Strike Me Pink
- Swing Time
- That Girl From Paris
- Three Smart Girls
- Walking on Air
- With Love and Kisses

=== 1937 ===
- Ali Baba Goes to Town
- Artists and Models
- Así es el tango
- Bewitching Kisses
- Blossoms on Broadway
- Broadway Melody of 1938
- A Damsel in Distress
- A Day at the Races
- Double or Nothing
- The Firefly
- The Girl Said No
- Heidi
- High Flyers
- High, Wide, and Handsome
- Hollywood Hotel
- I'll Take Romance
- Life Begins in College
- The Life of the Party
- Love and Hisses
- Make a Wish
- Manhattan Merry-Go-Round
- Maytime
- Music for Madame
- New Faces of 1937
- Nobody's Baby
- On Again-Off Again
- On the Avenue
- One Hundred Men and a Girl
- Our Gang Follies of 1938 (short)
- Ready, Willing, and Able
- Reunion in Rhythm (short)
- Rhythm in the Clouds
- Rootin' Tootin' Rhythm
- Rosalie
- Shall We Dance
- The Show Goes On
- Sing and Be Happy
- Sing While You're Able
- The Singing Marine
- Snow White and the Seven Dwarfs (animated)
- Something to Sing About
- Swing High, Swing Low
- Swing It, Professor
- Talent Scout
- Thin Ice
- Thoroughbreds Don't Cry
- Varsity Show
- Vogues of 1938
- Waikiki Wedding
- Wake Up and Live
- Way Out West
- When You're in Love
- You Can't Have Everything
- You're a Sweetheart

=== 1938 ===
- Aladdin's Lantern (short)
- Alexander's Ragtime Band
- Artists and Models Abroad
- The Big Broadcast of 1938
- Carefree
- Champagnegaloppen
- College Swing
- Cowboy from Brooklyn
- Doctor Rhythm
- The Duke is Tops
- Everybody Sing
- Freshman Year
- Garden of the Moon
- The Girl of the Golden West
- Give Me a Sailor
- Going Places
- Gold Diggers in Paris
- The Goldwyn Follies
- Goodbye Buenos Aires
- The Great Waltz
- Happy Landing
- Hawaii Calls
- In Old Chicago
- Josette
- Joy of Living
- Just Around the Corner
- Kentucky Moonshine
- Listen, Darling
- Little Miss Broadway
- Mad About Music
- My Lucky Star
- Outside of Paradise
- Radio City Revels
- Rebecca of Sunnybrook Farm
- Romance in the Dark
- Sally, Irene and Mary
- Sing You Sinners
- Songs and Saddles
- Start Cheering
- Straight Place and Show
- Sweethearts
- Swing, Sister, Swing
- Swing Your Lady
- Thanks for the Memory
- That Certain Age

=== 1939 ===
- At the Circus
- Babes in Arms
- Balalaika
- Broadway Serenade
- Captain Spanky's Show Boat (short)
- Closed Door (Spanish)
- Clown Princes (short)
- East Side of Heaven
- Escape to Paradise
- Everything's on Ice
- Fast and Furious
- First Love
- Giliw Ko (Filipino & Tagalog)
- Gulliver's Travels (animated)
- Hawaiian Nights
- Honolulu
- The Ice Follies of 1939
- The Lambeth Walk
- La Modelo de la calle Florida (Spanish)
- Let Freedom Ring
- The Little Princess
- Naughty but Nice
- Pack Up Your Troubles
- Paradise in Harlem
- Paris Honeymoon
- Rose of Washington Square
- Second Fiddle
- Some Like It Hot
- St. Louis Blues
- The Star Maker
- The Story of Vernon and Irene Castle
- Swanee River
- That's Right - You're Wrong
- The Three Musketeers
- Three Smart Girls Grow Up
- Time Out For Lessons (short)
- The Under-Pup
- Way Down South
- The Wizard of Oz

== 1940s ==
=== 1940 ===
- American Matchmaker (Yiddish)
- Andy Hardy Meets Debutante
- Argentine Nights
- Bitter Sweet
- The Boys from Syracuse
- Broadway Melody of 1940
- Buck Benny Rides Again
- Dancing on a Dime
- Down Argentine Way
- Fantasia (animated)
- Go West
- Her First Romance
- Hit Parade of 1941
- Hullabaloo
- I Can't Give You Anything But Love, Baby
- If I Had My Way
- I'm Nobody's Sweetheart Now
- Irene
- It's a Date
- La Conga Nights
- Lillian Russell
- A Little Bit of Heaven
- Little Nellie Kelly
- Love Thy Neighbor
- Ma! He's Making Eyes at Me
- Melody and Moonlight
- Melody Ranch
- Music in My Heart
- New Moon
- A Night at Earl Carroll's
- One Night in the Tropics
- Pinocchio (animated)
- Rhythm on the River
- Road to Singapore
- Second Chorus
- Sing, Dance, Plenty Hot
- Spring Parade
- Strike Up the Band
- Tin Pan Alley
- Too Many Girls
- Two Girls on Broadway
- Under Your Hat
- Waldo's Last Stand (short)
- You'll Find Out
- Young People

=== 1941 ===
- All-American Co-Ed
- Andy Hardy's Private Secretary
- Angels with Broken Wings
- Babes on Broadway
- The Big Store
- Birth of the Blues
- Blondie Goes Latin
- Blues in the Night
- Buck Privates
- Cadet Girl
- The Chocolate Soldier
- Dumbo (animated)
- Fiesta
- The Great American Broadcast
- Hellzapoppin'
- Hold That Ghost
- In the Navy
- It Started with Eve
- Keep 'Em Flying
- Kiss the Boys Goodbye
- Lady Be Good
- Las Vegas Nights
- Let's Go Collegiate
- Let's Make Music
- Louisiana Purchase
- Moon Over Miami
- Moonlight in Hawaii
- Moulin Rouge (French)
- Mr. Bug Goes to Town (animated)
- Navy Blues
- Nice Girl?
- Playmates
- Puddin' Head
- Road to Zanzibar
- San Antonio Rose
- Sing Another Chorus
- Smilin' Through
- Sun Valley Serenade
- Sunny
- Sweetheart of the Campus
- Swing It Soldier
- That Night in Rio
- They Meet Again
- They Met in Argentina
- Time Out for Rhythm
- Turned Out Nice Again
- Week-End in Havana
- Where Did You Get That Girl?
- Ye Olde Minstrels (short)
- You'll Never Get Rich
- You're the One
- Ziegfeld Girl
- Zis Boom Bah

=== 1942 ===
- Academia El Tango Argentino (Spanish)
- Almost Married
- Always in My Heart
- Bambi (animated)
- Behind the Eight Ball
- Born to Sing
- Broadway
- Cairo
- Doin' Their Bit (short)
- The Fleet's In
- Flying with Music
- Footlight Serenade
- For Me and My Gal
- Four Jacks and a Jill
- Get Hep to Love
- Give Out, Sisters
- Holiday Inn
- I Married An Angel
- Ice-Capades Revue
- Iceland
- Johnny Doughboy
- The Mayor of 44th Street
- Melodies Old and New (short)
- Moonlight in Havana
- My Gal Sal
- Orchestra Wives
- Panama Hattie
- Pardon My Sarong
- Priorities on Parade
- Private Buckaroo
- Ride 'Em Cowboy
- Rio Rita
- Road to Morocco
- Roxie Hart
- Saludos Amigos (animated)
- Seven Days' Leave
- Seven Sweethearts
- Ship Ahoy
- Sing Your Worries Away
- Sleepytime Gal
- Song of the Islands
- Springtime in the Rockies
- Star Spangled Rhythm
- Sweater Girl
- True to the Army
- The Vanishing Virginian
- When Johnny Comes Marching Home
- Yankee Doodle Dandy
- You Were Never Lovelier
- Youth on Parade

=== 1943 ===
- Always a Bridesmaid
- The Amazing Mrs. Holliday
- Around the World
- Best Foot Forward
- Cabin in the Sky
- Calling All Kids (short)
- Campus Rhythm
- Coney Island
- Cowboy in Manhattan
- Crazy House
- The Desert Song
- Dixie
- Doughboys in Ireland
- DuBarry Was a Lady
- Follow the Band
- Gals, Incorporated
- The Gang's All Here
- Girl Crazy
- Happy Go Lucky
- Hello, Frisco, Hello
- Hers to Hold
- Higher and Higher
- His Butler's Sister
- Hit the Ice
- Hit Parade of 1943
- Hi'ya, Chum
- I Dood It
- Is Everybody Happy?
- It Ain't Hay
- It Comes Up Love
- Jitterbugs
- Larceny With Music
- Let's Face It
- Moonlight in Vermont
- Never a Dull Moment
- Nobody's Darling
- Phantom of the Opera
- The Powers Girl
- Presenting Lily Mars
- Reveille with Beverly
- Rhythm of the Islands
- Rhythm Serenade
- Salute for Three
- She Has What It Takes
- She's for Me
- Silver Skates
- The Sky's the Limit
- Sleepy Lagoon
- Something to Shout About
- Spotlight Scandals
- Stage Door Canteen
- Stormy Weather
- The Sultan's Daughter
- Sweet Rosie O'Grady
- Swing Fever
- Swing Out the Blues
- Swingtime Johnny
- Tahiti Honey
- Thank Your Lucky Stars
- They Got Me Covered
- This is the Army
- Thousands Cheer
- What's Buzzin', Cousin?
- Wintertime
- You're a Lucky Fellow, Mr. Smith

=== 1944 ===
- And the Angels Sing
- Atlantic City
- Bathing Beauty
- Beautiful But Broke
- Belle of the Yukon
- Bowery to Broadway
- Brazil
- Broadway Rhythm
- Can't Help Singing
- Career Girl
- Carolina Blues
- Champagne Charlie
- Chip Off the Old Block
- Christmas Holiday
- The Climax
- Cover Girl
- Cowboy Canteen
- Dixie Jamboree
- Follow the Boys
- Four Jills in a Jeep
- Ghost Catchers
- Going My Way
- Greenwich Village
- Hat Check Honey
- Here Come the Waves
- Hey, Rookie
- Hollywood Canteen
- I'm from Arkansas
- In Society
- Irish Eyes Are Smiling
- Jam Session
- Kansas City Kitty
- Knickerbocker Holiday
- Lady in the Dark
- Lady, Let's Dance
- Lake Placid Serenade
- Lights of Old Santa Fe
- Lost in a Harem
- Meet Me in St. Louis
- Meet Miss Bobby Socks
- Meet the People
- Men on Her Mind
- The Merry Monahans
- Moon Over Las Vegas
- Moonlight and Cactus
- Music for Millions
- One Exciting Night
- Pin Up Girl
- Rainbow Island
- Sensations of 1945
- Seven Days Ashore
- She's a Sweetheart
- Shine On, Harvest Moon
- Show Business
- Sing a Jingle
- The Singing Sheriff
- Slightly Terrific
- Something for the Boys
- Song of the Open Road
- South of Dixie
- Step Lively
- Sweet and Low-Down
- Sweethearts of the U.S.A.
- Swing Hostess
- Swing in the Saddle
- Take It Big
- This Is the Life
- The Three Caballeros (animated)
- Two Girls and a Sailor
- Up in Arms
- Week-End Pass
- You Can't Ration Love

=== 1945 ===
- Abbott and Costello in Hollywood
- Anchors Aweigh
- The Bells of St. Mary's
- The Big Show-Off
- Birth of a Star
- Blonde from Brooklyn
- Delightfully Dangerous
- Diamond Horseshoe
- The Dolly Sisters
- Duffy's Tavern
- Eadie Was a Lady
- Easy to Look At
- Eve Knew Her Apples
- George White's Scandals
- Hello Moscow!
- Her Lucky Night
- Here Come the Co-Eds
- Honeymoon Ahead
- I Love a Bandleader
- Incendiary Blonde
- It's a Pleasure
- Lady on a Train
- The Naughty Nineties
- Night Club Girl
- Nob Hill
- On Stage Everybody
- Out of This World
- Pan-Americana
- Patrick the Great
- Penthouse Rhythm
- Radio Stars on Parade
- Rhapsody in Blue
- Rockin' in the Rockies
- See My Lawyer
- Senorita from the West
- Sing Your Way Home
- A Song for Miss Julie
- Song of the Sarong
- The Soul of a Tango
- State Fair
- The Stork Club
- Sunbonnet Sue
- Swing Out, Sister
- Tell It to a Star
- That Night with You
- That's the Spirit
- Thrill of a Romance
- Tonight and Every Night
- Under Western Skies
- Where Do We Go From Here?
- Wonder Man
- Yolanda and the Thief
- Ziegfeld Follies

=== 1946 ===
- Because of Him
- Better Late (live broadcast)
- Beware
- Blue Skies
- Centennial Summer
- Cross My Heart
- Cuban Pete
- Ding Dong Williams
- Do You Love Me
- Doll Face
- Earl Carroll Sketchbook
- Easy to Wed
- Freddie Steps Out
- The Great Morgan
- The Harvey Girls
- Holiday in Mexico
- If I'm Lucky
- It's Great to Be Young
- The Jolson Story
- Junior Prom
- The Kid from Brooklyn
- Love Laughs at Andy Hardy
- Make Mine Music (animated)
- Mantan Messes Up
- Monsieur Beaucaire
- Murder in the Music Hall
- Night and Day
- No Leave, No Love
- The Road to Hollywood
- Road to Utopia
- Sing While You Dance
- Singin' in the Corn
- Slightly Scandalous
- Song of the South
- Susie Steps Out
- Sweetheart of Sigma Chi
- Swing Parade of 1946
- Talk About a Lady
- Tars and Spars
- The Thrill of Brazil
- Till the Clouds Roll By
- The Time, the Place and the Girl
- Three Little Girls in Blue
- Two Sisters from Boston

=== 1947 ===
- Beat the Band
- Bowery Buckaroos
- Calendar Girl
- Carnegie Hall
- Carnival in Costa Rica
- Cigarette Girl
- Cinderella
- Copacabana
- Down to Earth
- Ebony Parade
- The Fabulous Dorseys
- Fiesta
- Fun and Fancy Free (animated)
- Good News
- Hi De Ho
- I Wonder Who's Kissing Her Now
- I'll Be Yours
- It Happened in Brooklyn
- Living in a Big Way
- Look-Out Sister
- Mother Wore Tights
- My Wild Irish Rose
- New Orleans
- Northwest Outpost
- The Perils of Pauline
- Reet, Petite, and Gone
- Rhythm in a Riff
- Road to Rio
- Sarge Goes to College
- Sepia Cinderella
- The Shocking Miss Pilgrim
- Something in the Wind
- Song of Scheherazade
- That's My Gal
- This Time for Keeps
- Two Blondes and a Redhead
- The Unfinished Dance
- Variety Girl
- Welcome Stranger

=== 1948 ===
- April Showers
- Are You with It?
- Big City
- Campus Honeymoon
- Campus Sleuth
- Casbah
- The Countess of Monte Cristo
- A Date with Judy
- Easter Parade
- The Emperor Waltz
- Feudin', Fussin' and A-Fightin'
- For the Love of Mary
- Glamour Girl
- I Surrender Dear
- Julia Misbehaves
- Killer Diller
- The Kissing Bandit
- Ladies of the Chorus
- Luxury Liner
- Melody Time (animated)
- Mexican Hayride
- On an Island with You
- One Sunday Afternoon
- One Touch of Venus
- The Paleface
- The Pirate
- The Red Shoes
- Romance on the High Seas
- A Song is Born
- Summer Holiday
- That Lady in Ermine
- Three Daring Daughters
- Two Guys from Texas
- Up in Central Park
- When My Baby Smiles at Me
- Words and Music
- You Were Meant for Me

=== 1949 ===
- The Adventures of Ichabod and Mr. Toad (animated)
- Alice in Wonderland (live-action/stop-motion animated)
- Always Leave Them Laughing
- The Barkleys of Broadway
- The Beautiful Blonde from Bashful Bend
- A Connecticut Yankee in King Arthur's Court
- Dancing in the Dark
- The Great Lover
- Holiday in Havana
- In the Good Old Summertime
- The Inspector General
- It's a Great Feeling
- Jolson Sings Again
- Look for the Silver Lining
- Make Believe Ballroom
- Make Mine Laughs
- My Dream Is Yours
- My Friend Irma
- Neptune's Daughter
- On the Town
- Oh, You Beautiful Doll
- Red, Hot and Blue
- Shamrock Hill
- Slightly French
- So Dear to My Heart
- The Sun Comes Up
- Take Me Out to the Ball Game
- That Midnight Kiss
- There's a Girl in My Heart
- Top o' the Morning
- Yes Sir, That's My Baby
- You're My Everything

== 1950s ==
=== 1950 ===
- Al Compás de tu Mentira
- Annie Get Your Gun
- At War with the Army
- Blues Busters
- Bólidos de acero
- Catskill Honeymoon
- Cinderella (animated)
- The Daughter of Rosie O'Grady
- Duchess of Idaho
- Fancy Pants
- Filomena Marturano
- Hoedown
- Let's Dance
- Love Happy
- Mr. Music
- My Blue Heaven
- My Friend Irma Goes West
- Nancy Goes to Rio
- Pagan Love Song
- The Petty Girl
- Riding High
- Summer Stock
- Tea for Two
- Three Little Words
- The Toast of New Orleans
- Two Weeks with Love
- Wabash Avenue
- The West Point Story
- Young Man with a Horn

=== 1951 ===
- Alice in Wonderland (animated)
- An American in Paris
- Call Me Mister
- Comin' Round the Mountain
- Disc Jockey
- Excuse My Dust
- Golden Girl
- The Great Caruso
- Grounds for Marriage
- Happy Go Lovely
- Here Comes the Groom
- I'll See You in My Dreams
- The Lemon Drop Kid
- Lullaby of Broadway
- Meet Me After the Show
- Mr. Imperium
- On Moonlight Bay
- On the Riviera
- Painting the Clouds with Sunshine
- Rhythm Inn
- Rich, Young and Pretty
- Royal Wedding
- Show Boat
- Starlift
- Sunny Side of the Street
- The Tales of Hoffmann
- Texas Carnival
- That's My Boy
- Two Tickets to Broadway

=== 1952 ===
- Aaron Slick from Punkin Crick
- Abbott and Costello Meet Captain Kidd
- About Face
- April in Paris
- Because You're Mine
- The Belle of New York
- Bloodhounds of Broadway
- Castle in the Air aka Rainbow 'Round My Shoulder
- Everything I Have is Yours
- A Great New Star
- The Greatest Show on Earth
- Hans Christian Andersen
- I Dream of Jeanie
- Jack and the Beanstalk
- The Jazz Singer
- Jumping Jacks
- Just for You
- Lost in Alaska
- Lovely to Look At
- Meet Danny Wilson
- Million Dollar Mermaid
- Road to Bali
- Sailor Beware
- She's Working Her Way Through College
- Singin' in the Rain
- Skirts Ahoy!
- Somebody Loves Me
- Son of Paleface
- Stars and Stripes Forever
- Where's Charley?
- With a Song in My Heart

=== 1953 ===
- The 5,000 Fingers of Dr. T.
- The Affairs of Dobie Gillis
- All Ashore
- The Band Wagon
- The Beggar's Opera
- By the Light of the Silvery Moon
- The Caddy
- Calamity Jane
- Call Me Madam
- Cruisin' Down the River
- Dangerous When Wet
- The Desert Song
- Down Among the Sheltering Palms
- Easy to Love
- The Eddie Cantor Story
- The Farmer Takes A Wife
- The French Line
- Gentlemen Prefer Blondes
- The Girl Next Door
- The Glenn Miller Story
- Here Come the Girls
- The I Don't Care Girl
- I Love Melvin
- Kiss Me Kate
- Let's Do It Again
- Lili
- Meet Me at the Fair
- Money From Home
- Ojōsan shachō (Japan)
- Overture to The Merry Wives of Windsor (short)
- Pack Train
- Peter Pan (animated)
- Scared Stiff
- She's Back on Broadway
- Small Town Girl
- So This is Love
- Sombrero
- The Stars Are Singing
- Stars of the Russian Ballet (Russian)
- The Stooge
- Sweethearts on Parade
- Three Sailors and a Girl
- Tonight We Sing
- Torch Song
- Walking My Baby Back Home

=== 1954 ===
- 3 Ring Circus
- Athena
- Brigadoon
- Carmen Jones
- Casanova's Big Night
- The Country Girl
- Dayman Ma'ak
- Deep in My Heart
- French Cancan
- Give a Girl a Break
- Living It Up
- Lucky Me
- Max Liebman Presents (television specials):
  - Satins and Spurs
  - Lady in the Dark
  - The Follies of Suzy
  - Best Foot Forward
  - Babes in Toyland
- New Faces
- Red Garters
- Round Up of Rhythm
- Rose Marie
- Seven Brides for Seven Brothers
- So This Is Paris
- A Star Is Born
- The Student Prince
- There's No Business Like Show Business
- Top Banana
- White Christmas
- Young at Heart

=== 1955 ===
- Abbott and Costello Meet the Mummy
- Ain't Misbehavin'
- Artists and Models
- Bring Your Smile Along
- Daddy Long Legs
- Gentlemen Marry Brunettes
- The Glass Slipper
- Guys and Dolls
- Hit the Deck
- Interrupted Melody
- It's Always Fair Weather
- Jupiter's Darling
- Kismet
- Lady and the Tramp (animated)
- Love Me or Leave Me
- Max Liebman Presents (television specials):
  - Naughty Marietta
  - A Connecticut Yankee
  - The Merry Widow
  - The Desert Song
  - The Chocolate Soldier
  - Heidi
  - The Great Waltz
  - Dearest Enemy
- My Sister Eileen
- Oklahoma!
- Paris Follies of 1956
- Pete Kelly's Blues
- Producers' Showcase: Peter Pan (live broadcast)
- The Second Greatest Sex
- The Seven Little Foys
- So Young, So Bright (Japan)
- The Tender Trap
- Three for the Show
- You're Never Too Young

=== 1956 ===
- Anything Goes
- The Benny Goodman Story
- The Best Things in Life Are Free
- Bundle of Joy
- Carousel
- The Court Jester
- Don't Knock the Rock
- The Eddy Duchin Story
- The Girl Can't Help It
- High Society
- Hollywood Or Bust
- Invitation to the Dance
- It's Great to Be Young
- The King and I
- Love Me Tender
- Max Liebman Presents (television specials):
  - Paris in the Springtime
  - The Adventures of Marco Polo
  - Holiday (based on Elmer Rice's The Grand Tour)
- Meet Me in Las Vegas
- Once Upon a Honeymoon
- The Opposite Sex
- Pardners
- Producers' Showcase (television specials):
  - Peter Pan
  - Bloomer Girl
- Rock Around the Clock
- Rock, Rock, Rock
- Serenade
- Shake, Rattle and Rock
- The Vagabond King
- You Can't Run Away From It

=== 1957 ===
- April Love
- Bernardine
- Calypso Heat Wave
- Funny Face
- The Girl Most Likely
- The Good Companions
- Jailhouse Rock
- Jamboree
- The Joker Is Wild
- Les Girls
- Let's Be Happy
- Loving You
- Mister Rock and Roll
- The Pajama Game
- Pal Joey
- The Pied Piper of Hamelin
- Pinocchio (Television Special)
- Silk Stockings
- Ten Thousand Bedrooms

=== 1958 ===
- Arrivederci Roma (The Seven Hills of Rome)
- Damn Yankees
- Gigi
- Jazzgossen
- King Creole
- Merry Andrew
- Musik ombord
- Rock-A-Bye Baby
- Senior Prom
- Sing, Boy, Sing
- St. Louis Blues
- South Pacific
- Tom thumb

=== 1959 ===
- Darby O'Gill and the Little People
- Five Golden Flowers (China)
- The Five Pennies
- For the First Time
- Go, Johnny Go!
- Hier bin ich – hier bleib ich (Here I Am, Here I Stay)
- A Hole in the Head
- Juke Box Rhythm
- Li'l Abner
- Meet Me in St. Louis (television film)
- Never Steal Anything Small
- Say One for Me
- Sleeping Beauty (animated)
- Some Like It Hot
- Porgy and Bess

== 1960s ==
=== 1960 ===
- 1-2-3-4 ou Les Collants noirs
- Alakazam the Great (anime)
- Bells Are Ringing
- Black Tights
- Can-Can
- Cinderella
- Expresso Bongo
- G.I. Blues
- High Time
- Khovanshchina
- Let's Make Love
- Pepe
- Peter Pan (television special)
- The Adventures of Alice (television film)
- Where the Boys Are

=== 1961 ===
- Amorina
- Babes in Toyland
- Besito a Papa
- Blue Hawaii
- The Choppers
- Flower Drum Song
- Gidget Goes Hawaiian
- Juventud Rebelde (film)
- One Hundred and One Dalmatians (animated)
- The Parent Trap
- Show Girl (filmed production)
- Snow White and the Three Stooges
- The Teenage Millionaire
- Twist Around the Clock
- West Side Story
- Wild in the Country
- The Young Ones

=== 1962 ===
- At the Drop of a Hat (television special)
- The Big Broadcast
- Billy Rose's Jumbo
- The Cool Mikado
- Don't Knock the Twist
- Eegah
- Follow That Dream
- Gay Purr-ee (animated)
- Girls! Girls! Girls!
- Gypsy
- Hussar Ballad
- It's Trad, Dad!
- Kid Galahad
- The Music Man
- A ritmo de twist
- The Road to Hong Kong
- State Fair
- Wild Guitar

=== 1963 ===
- Beach Party
- Bye Bye Birdie
- Follow the Boys
- Fun in Acapulco
- Gidget Goes to Rome
- Goldilocks and the Three Bares
- I Could Go On Singing
- It Happened at the World's Fair
- Live It Up!
- Rocío de La Mancha (Spain)
- Rote Lippen soll man küssen
- Summer Holiday
- Summer Magic
- The Sword in the Stone (animated)

=== 1964 ===
- Bikini Beach
- Buenas noches, Buenos Aires
- A Canção da Saudade
- Gonks Go Beat
- A Hard Day's Night
- Hey There, It's Yogi Bear! (animated)
- I'd Rather Be Rich
- The Incredibly Strange Creatures Who Stopped Living and Became Mixed-Up Zombies
- Kissin' Cousins
- Looking for Love
- Mary Poppins
- Muscle Beach Party
- My Fair Lady
- Once Upon a Mattress (television film)
- Pajama Party
- The Pleasure Seekers
- Robin and the 7 Hoods
- Roustabout
- Rudolph the Red-Nosed Reindeer (animated TV special)
- The Umbrellas of Cherbourg
- The Unsinkable Molly Brown
- Viva Las Vegas
- What a Way to Go!
- Wonderful Life

=== 1965 ===
- Beach Blanket Bingo
- Girl Happy
- Harum Scarum
- Help!
- Highest Pressure
- How to Stuff a Wild Bikini
- I'll Take Sweden
- Inside the Forbidden City
- I've Gotta Horse
- Sergeant Deadhead
- Ski Party
- The Sound of Music
- A Swingin' Summer
- T.A.M.I. Show
- Tickle Me
- When the Boys Meet the Girls
- Wild on the Beach

=== 1966 ===
- Brigadoon (television film)
- The Canterville Ghost (television film)
- Evening Primrose (television film)
- Finders Keepers
- Frankie and Johnny
- A Funny Thing Happened on the Way to the Forum
- Hold On!
- Hong Kong Nocturne
- Jimmy, the Boy Wonder
- The Man Called Flintstone (animated)
- Olympus 7-0000 (television film)
- On the Flip Side (television film)
- Paradise, Hawaiian Style
- The Singing Nun
- Spinout

=== 1967 ===
- Annie Get Your Gun (live broadcast)
- At the Drop of Another Hat (television special)
- Camelot
- Clambake
- Les Demoiselles de Rochefort
- Damn Yankees! (television film)
- Doctor Dolittle
- Double Trouble
- Easy Come, Easy Go
- The Fastest Guitar Alive
- Festival
- Good Times
- Half a Sixpence
- The Happiest Millionaire
- How to Succeed in Business Without Really Trying
- The Jungle Book (animated)
- Mad Monster Party? (animated)
- Thoroughly Modern Millie
- Wedding in Malinovka
- The Young Girls of Rochefort

=== 1968 ===
- Chitty Chitty Bang Bang
- Finian's Rainbow
- Funny Girl
- Head
- Heißer Sommer (Hot Summer)
- Hong Kong Rhapsody
- Live a Little, Love a Little
- Mrs. Brown, You've Got a Lovely Daughter
- Oliver!
- Pinocchio (television film)
- The One and Only, Genuine, Original Family Band
- Speedway
- Star!
- Stay Away, Joe
- Yellow Submarine (animated)

=== 1969 ===
- A Boy Named Charlie Brown (animated)
- Can Heironymus Merkin Ever Forget Mercy Humppe and Find True Happiness?
- Change of Habit
- Goodbye, Mr. Chips
- Hans Brinker
- Hello, Dolly!
- How to Commit Marriage
- Johnny Cash! The Man, His World, His Music
- Oh! What a Lovely War
- Paint Your Wagon
- Przygoda z piosenką (Poland)
- Sweet Charity
- The Trouble with Girls (and How to Get Into It)

== 1970s ==
=== 1970 ===
- The Aristocats (animated)
- Darling Lili
- Monrak luk thung
- On a Clear Day You Can See Forever
- Peau d'Âne (Donkey Skin)
- Pufnstuf
- Scrooge
- Shinbone Alley (animated)
- Song of Norway
- Toomorrow

=== 1971 ===
- 200 Motels
- Aquellos años locos
- Arriba Juventud
- Bedknobs and Broomsticks
- The Boy Friend
- The Cat in the Hat (animated TV special)
- Fiddler on the Roof
- Willy Wonka & the Chocolate Factory

=== 1972 ===
- 1776
- Alice's Adventures in Wonderland
- Argentinísima
- Cabaret
- The Great Waltz
- Hellzapoppin' (television film)
- Imagine
- Journey Back to Oz (animated)
- Man of La Mancha
- Oh! Calcutta!
- Once Upon a Mattress (television film)
- Snoopy Come Home (animated)

=== 1973 ===
- Andrea
- Argentinísima II
- Charlotte's Web (animated)
- Dr. Jekyll and Mr. Hyde (television film)
- Godspell
- Jaal
- Jesus Christ Superstar
- Lost Horizon
- Robin Hood (animated)
- Tom Sawyer

=== 1974 ===
- Devil’s Bride (Lithuanian)
- Huckleberry Finn
- The Little Prince
- Mame
- Oliver Twist (animated)
- Phantom of the Paradise
- The Straw Hat (Russian)
- That's Entertainment!
- Theater in America: In Fashion (filmed production; musical based on Georges Feydeau's Tailleur Pour Dames)

=== 1975 ===
- Alice Cooper: The Nightmare
- At Long Last Love
- Dick Deadeye, or Duty Done (animated)
- Finist - Yasnyy sokol
- Funny Lady
- Hugo the Hippo (animated)
- It's a Bird... It's a Plane... It's Superman (television film)
- Lisztomania
- Nashville
- Pesnya vsegda s nami
- The Rocky Horror Picture Show
- Tommy
- Tubby the Tuba (animated)

=== 1976 ===
- Alice In Wonderland
- The Blue Bird
- Bugsy Malone
- The First Nudie Musical
- A Matter of Time
- Oz
- Pacific Overtures (filmed production)
- Revenge of the Cheerleaders
- The Slipper and the Rose
- Sparkle
- A Star Is Born
- That's Entertainment, Part II

=== 1977 ===
- Cinderella (aka The Other Cinderella)
- Dot and the Kangaroo (animated)
- Emmet Otter's Jug Band Christmas
- A Little Night Music
- The Many Adventures of Winnie the Pooh (animated)
- New York, New York
- Pete's Dragon
- Raggedy Ann & Andy: A Musical Adventure (animated)
- The Rescuers (animated)
- Saturday Night Fever

=== 1978 ===
- The Comedy of Errors (television special)
- d'Artagnan and Three Musketeers (miniseries)
- The Devil and Daniel Mouse (animated)
- Grease
- 31 June
- Junior High School
- The Magic of Lassie
- The New Adventures of Heidi (television film)
- An Ordinary Miracle (USSR)
- Puff the Magic Dragon (animated TV special)
- Renaldo and Clara
- The Rutles: All You Need Is Cash (television film)
- Sextette
- Sgt. Pepper's Lonely Hearts Club Band
- Thank God It's Friday
- The Wiz

=== 1979 ===
- All That Jazz
- Hair
- Metamorphoses (animated)
- The Muppet Movie
- The Music Machine
- Puff the Magic Dragon in the Land of the Living Lies (animated TV special)
- Rock 'n' Roll High School
- The Rose
- She Loves Me (Television film)
- Theater in America: When Hell Freezes Over, I'll Skate (filmed production)

== 1980s ==
=== 1980 ===
- The Apple
- Blank Generation
- The Blues Brothers
- Can't Stop the Music
- Fame
- The Great Rock 'n' Roll Swindle
- HBO Theater: Camelot (filmed production)
- The Jazz Singer
- Great Performances: The Most Happy Fella (filmed production)
- The Pirates of Penzance (filmed production)
- Popeye
- Snow White and the Seven Dwarfs (filmed production)
- Tell Me on a Sunday (filmed production)
- Times Square
- Xanadu

=== 1981 ===
- American Pop (animated)
- Around the World with Dot (animated)
- Back to the Egg
- Blood Wedding
- The Fox and the Hound (animated)
- The Great Muppet Caper
- Honky Tonk Freeway
- Pennies from Heaven
- Shock Treatment
- Sophisticated Ladies (filmed production)
- This Is Elvis

=== 1982 ===
- Ain't Misbehavin' (television special)
- Alice at the Palace (television film)
- American Playhouse: Working (television film)
- Annie
- The Best Little Whorehouse in Texas
- Charodei
- The Dub Room Special
- Forbidden Zone
- Grease 2
- Heidi's Song (animated)
- The Mikado (filmed production)
- One from the Heart
- Pink Floyd The Wall
- Pippin (television production)
- The Pirate Movie
- Puff and the Incredible Mr. Nobody (animated TV special)
- Sweeney Todd: The Demon Barber of Fleet Street (filmed production)
- Starstruck
- Une chambre en ville
- Victor Victoria

=== 1983 ===
- Eddie and the Cruisers
- Dot and the Bunny (animated)
- Dream of a Summer Night
- The Final Cut
- I Am a Hotel
- Mantrap
- Mary Poppins, Goodbye
- Monty Python's The Meaning of Life
- The Pirates of Penzance
- The Return of Captain Invincible
- Rock & Rule (animated)
- The Wind in the Willows (animated)
- Yentl

=== 1984 ===
- Body Rock
- Breakin'
- Dot and the Koala (animated)
- Footloose
- Gallavants (animated)
- Give My Regards to Broad Street
- The Muppets Take Manhattan
- Purple Rain
- Rhinestone
- Streets of Fire
- Voyage of the Rock Aliens

=== 1985 ===
- Alice in Wonderland (television)
- Billy the Kid and the Green Baize Vampire
- Blue Money
- Breakin' 2: Electric Boogaloo
- The Care Bears Movie (animated)
- A Chorus Line
- Dot and Keeto (animated)
- Great Performances: The Gospel at Colonus (filmed production)
- Krush Groove
- Sesame Street Presents Follow That Bird
- That's Dancing!
- Winter Evening in Gagra
- You're a Good Man, Charlie Brown (animated television special)

=== 1986 ===
- Absolute Beginners
- American Playhouse: Sunday in the Park with George (filmed production)
- An American Tail (animated)
- Babes in Toyland
- Barnum (filmed production)
- Care Bears Movie II: A New Generation (animated)
- Crossroads
- Dot and the Whale (animated)
- El Amor brujo
- The Elm-Chanted Forest (animated)
- Footrot Flats: The Dog's Tale (animated)
- The Frog Prince
- Labyrinth
- Little Shop of Horrors
- Live from Lincoln Center: Candide (filmed production)
- My Little Pony: The Movie (animated)
- Population: 1
- True Stories
- Under the Cherry Moon

=== 1987 ===
- Aria
- Beauty and the Beast
- Body Contact
- The Brave Little Toaster (animated)
- The Care Bears Adventure in Wonderland (animated)
- The Chipmunk Adventure (animated)
- The Emperor's New Clothes
- The Garbage Pail Kids Movie
- Dirty Dancing
- Dot and the Smugglers (animated)
- Hansel and Gretel
- It Couldn't Happen Here
- La Bamba
- The Mikado (filmed production)
- The Return of Bruno
- Rumpelstiltskin
- Sleeping Beauty
- Snow White

=== 1988 ===
- La Bailanta
- Big Time
- Bridge
- Candide (filmed production)
- Dot Goes to Hollywood (animated)
- Earth Girls Are Easy
- Hairspray
- Salsa
- The New Adventures of Pippi Longstocking
- Moonwalker
- Oliver and Company (animated)
- Puss in Boots

=== 1989 ===
- All Dogs Go to Heaven (animated)
- Bert Rigby, You're a Fool
- The BFG (animated television film)
- Boris Godunov
- UHF
- Eddie and the Cruisers II: Eddie Lives!
- Great Performances: Show Boat (filmed production)
- The Little Mermaid (animated)
- Little Nemo: Adventures in Slumberland (animated)
- Mack the Knife
- Polly (television film)
- Red Riding Hood
- Rooftops
- Teen Witch

== 1990s ==
=== 1990 ===
- Cry-Baby
- Graffiti Bridge
- Live from Lincoln Center: A Little Night Music (filmed production)
- Mother Goose Rock 'n' Rhyme (television film)
- Polly: Comin' Home! (television film)
- Rock 'n' Roll High School Forever
- Rockula
- Shangri-La Plaza (TV pilot)

=== 1991 ===
- American Playhouse: Into the Woods (filmed production)
- An American Tail: Fievel Goes West (animated)
- Beauty and the Beast (animated)
- The Commitments (film)
- The Five Heartbeats
- For the Boys
- The Magic Riddle (animated)
- Nudist Colony of the Dead
- Rock-A-Doodle (animated)
- Rover Dangerfield (animated)
- Stepping Out
- The Supporter (Argentina)
- Wild Texas Wind (television film)
- The Will Rogers Follies: A Life in Revue (filmed production)

=== 1992 ===
- Aladdin (animated)
- At the Edge of the Law
- The Muppet Christmas Carol
- Newsies
- Sarafina!
- Tom and Jerry: The Movie (animated)

=== 1993 ===
- American Playhouse: Porgy and Bess
- Cabaret (filmed production)
- Cannibal! The Musical
- David Copperfield (animated)
- Gift
- The Mayflower Adventures (animated)
- Great Performances: Black and Blue (filmed production)
- Gypsy (television film)
- The Line, the Cross & the Curve
- The Nightmare Before Christmas (animated)
- Nunsense (television film)
- Cruel Summer (with Bananarama) (animated)
- Raising Hell (video)
- Robin Hood: Men In Tights
- Romeo & Julian: A Love Story (video)
- Zero Patience

=== 1994 ===
- A Christmas Carol (with Mariah Carey) (animated)
- Brave
- Dot in Space (animated)
- The Ink Thief (television miniseries)
- The Land Before Time II: The Great Valley Adventure (animated)
- The Lion King (animated)
- Nunsense 2: The Sequel (television film)
- The Pirates of Penzance (filmed production)
- The Return of Jafar (animated)
- The Swan Princess (animated)
- That's Entertainment! III (documentary)
- Thumbelina (animated)
- A Troll in Central Park (animated)

=== 1995 ===
- Akropol
- Babe
- Bye Bye Birdie
- The Fantasticks
- A Goofy Movie (animated)
- The Land Before Time III: The Time of the Great Giving (animated)
- Let It Be Me
- Monster Mash
- The Nona Tapes
- The Pebble and the Penguin (animated)
- Pocahontas (animated)
- Victor/Victoria (filmed production)

=== 1996 ===
- Adiós, abuelo
- Al Corazón
- Aladdin and the King of Thieves (animated)
- American Playhouse: Passion (filmed production)
- American Slippers
- All Dogs Go to Heaven 2 (animated)
- Cannibal! The Musical
- Company (filmed production)
- Everyone Says I Love You
- Evita
- The Hunchback of Notre Dame (animated)
- James and the Giant Peach (animated)
- Joe's Apartment
- The Land Before Time IV: Journey Through the Mists (animated)
- Live from Lincoln Center: The Merry Widow (filmed production)
- Muppet Treasure Island

=== 1997 ===
- Anastasia (animated)
- Babes in Toyland (animated)
- Beauty and the Beast: The Enchanted Christmas (animated)
- Cabaret Neiges Noires
- Cats Don't Dance (animated)
- Cinderella (television film)
- The Fearless Four (animated)
- H.M.S. Pinafore (filmed production)
- Hercules (animated)
- The Land Before Time V: The Mysterious Island (animated)
- Pippi Longstocking (animated)
- Pooh's Grand Adventure: The Search for Christopher Robin (animated)
- Selena (biographical)
- Spice World
- The Swan Princess II: Escape from Castle Mountain (animated)
- New York State Theatre Institute's A Tale of Cinderella (filmed production)
- The Wiggles Movie

=== 1998 ===
- An All Dogs Christmas Carol (animated)
- An American Tail: The Treasure of Manhattan Island (animated)
- Barney's Great Adventure
- Blues Brothers 2000
- The Brave Little Toaster Goes to Mars (animated)
- Buenos Aires me mata
- Cats (filmed production)
- Dance with Me
- The Hole
- The Land Before Time VI: The Secret of Saurus Rock (animated)
- The Lion King II: Simba's Pride (animated)
- The Mighty Kong (animated)
- Mulan (animated)
- Nunsense III: Sister Amnesia's Country Western Nunsense Jamboree (television special)
- Pocahontas II: Journey to a New World (animated)
- The Prince of Egypt (animated)
- Quest for Camelot (animated)
- Rudolph the Red-Nosed Reindeer: The Movie (animated)
- The Rugrats Movie (animated)
- The Secret of NIMH 2: Timmy to the Rescue (animated)
- The Swan Princess: The Mystery of the Enchanted Kingdom (animated)

=== 1999 ===
- The Adventures of Elmo in Grouchland
- An American Tail: The Mystery of the Night Monster (animated)
- Animal Farm
- Annie (television film)
- Blue Valley Songbird (television film)
- The Brave Little Toaster to the Rescue (animated)
- Double Platinum (television film)
- Fantasia 2000 (animated)
- Great Performances: Crazy for You (filmed production)
- Jackie's Back (television film)
- Joseph and the Amazing Technicolor Dreamcoat (direct-to-video)
- The King and I (animated)
- Madeline: Lost in Paris (animated)
- Seasons of Giving (animated)
- South Park: Bigger, Longer & Uncut (animated)
- Tarzan (animated)
- Wakko's Wish (animated)

== 2000s ==
=== 2000 ===
- Almost Famous
- Coyote Ugly
- Dancer in the Dark
- Geppetto (television film)
- Help! I'm a Fish (animated)
- How the Grinch Stole Christmas
- Jesus Christ Superstar (direct-to-video)
- Joseph: King of Dreams (animated)
- The Land Before Time VII: The Stone of Cold Fire (animated)
- Leprechaun in the Hood (direct to video)
- The Little Mermaid II: Return to the Sea (animated)
- Love's Labour's Lost
- Peter Pan (filmed production)
- Putting It Together: Direct from Broadway (filmed production)
- The Road to El Dorado (animated)
- Smokey Joe's Cafe: Direct from Broadway (filmed production)
- The Tigger Movie (animated)
- Tweety's High-Flying Adventure (animated)

=== 2001 ===
- Carmen: A Hip Hopera
- Glitter
- The Happiness of the Katakuris
- The Happy Cricket (animated)
- Hedwig and the Angry Inch
- Jekyll & Hyde: Direct from Broadway (filmed production)
- Lady and the Tramp II: Scamp's Adventure (animated)
- The Land Before Time VIII: The Big Freeze (animated)
- Moulin Rouge!
- Nuncrackers: The Nunsense Christmas Musical (filmed production)
- Rudolph the Red-Nosed Reindeer and the Island of Misfit Toys (animated)
- South Pacific (television film)
- These Old Broads
- Very Annie Mary

=== 2002 ===
- 8 femmes
- 8 Mile
- Chicago
- Eight Crazy Nights (animated)
- Great Performances: Fosse (filmed production)
- The Hunchback of Notre Dame II (animated)
- It's a Very Merry Muppet Christmas Movie (television film)
- Jonah: A VeggieTales Movie (animated)
- The Land Before Time IX: Journey to Big Water (animated)
- Live from Lincoln Center (filmed productions):
  - Contact
  - Porgy and Bess
- El otro lado de la cama
- Ragtime (filmed production)
- Rebelové (Czech Republic)
- Return to Never Land (animated)
- Winnie the Pooh: A Very Merry Pooh Year (animated)

=== 2003 ===
- 101 Dalmatians II: Patch's London Adventure (animated)
- Camp
- Charlotte's Web 2: Wilbur's Great Adventure (animated)
- The Cheetah Girls (television film)
- From Justin to Kelly
- Interstella 5555: The 5tory of the 5ecret 5tar 5ystem (animated)
- The Fighting Temptations
- Great Performances: Kiss Me, Kate (filmed production)
- The Jungle Book 2 (animated)
- The Land Before Time X: The Great Longneck Migration (animated)
- Marci X
- The Music Man (television film)
- Not on the Lips (Pas sur la bouche)
- Oklahoma! (filmed production)
- Our House (filmed production)
- Piglet's Big Movie (animated)
- Rugrats Go Wild (animated)
- The Saddest Music in the World
- School of Rock
- Seeing Double
- The Singing Detective
- Taboo (filmed production)

=== 2004 ===
- Art Thief Musical!
- Barbie as the Princess and the Pauper (animated direct-to-video)
- Bride and Prejudice
- A Christmas Carol (television film)
- De-Lovely
- Home on the Range (animated)
- Mickey, Donald, Goofy: The Three Musketeers (animated)
- The Lion King 1½ (animated)
- The Magical Gathering (TV special)
- Open House
- The Phantom of the Opera
- The Polar Express (animated)
- The Rat Pack: Live from Las Vegas (filmed production)
- Ray (biographical)
- Some Kind of Monster (documentary)
- Springtime with Roo (animated)
- Teacher's Pet (animated)
- Terkel in Trouble (animated horror)

=== 2005 ===
- Black Widow
- Boss'n Up
- Bosta
- Confessions of a Thug
- Corpse Bride (animated)
- Credo (short)
- Get Rich or Die Tryin'
- Giuseppe Verdi's Rigoletto Story (Italian)
- Jerry Springer: The Opera (filmed production)
- The Land Before Time XI: Invasion of the Tinysauruses (animated)
- Mulan II (animated)
- The Muppets' Wizard of Oz (television film)
- Once Upon a Mattress (television film)
- Perhaps Love
- Pooh's Heffalump Halloween Movie (animated)
- Pooh's Heffalump Movie (animated)
- Princess Raccoon
- The Producers
- Reefer Madness: The Movie Musical
- Rent
- Romance & Cigarettes
- School's Out! The Musical (animated television film)
- The Wayward Cloud

=== 2006 ===
- 200 Pounds Beauty (Korean)
- Acorn Antiques: The Musical! (filmed production)
- Alice's Adventures in Wonderland (filmed production)
- Bolletjes Blues
- Camp Blood: The Musical (short slasher)
- The Cheetah Girls 2 (television film)
- Dasepo Naughty Girls
- Dreamgirls
- El Benny
- The Fox and the Hound 2 (animated)
- The Fox Family
- Happy Feet (animated)
- High School Musical (television film)
- I Love You, I'm Sorry, and I'll Never Do It Again (short)
- Idlewild
- Jeff Wayne's Musical Version of The War of the Worlds (filmed production)
- The Land Before Time XII: The Great Day of the Flyers (animated)
- Live from Lincoln Center: The Light in the Piazza (filmed production)
- Poultrygeist: Night of the Chicken Dead (horror)
- Radio! The Musical (filmed production)
- Red Riding Hood
- Strawberry Shortcake: The Sweet Dreams Movie (animated)
- The Ten Commandments: The Musical (filmed production)
- Tenacious D in The Pick of Destiny
- Zombie Prom (short)

=== 2007 ===
- Across the Universe
- AKA Life
- Alvin and the Chipmunks
- Atlantis SquarePantis (animated television film)
- August Rush
- Barbie as the Island Princess (animated direct-to-video)
- Christmas Is Here Again (animated direct-to-video)
- Cinderella III: A Twist in Time (animated direct-to-video)
- Colma: The Musical
- Crazy
- Enchanted
- Hairspray
- High School Musical 2 (television film)
- The Land Before Time XIII: The Wisdom of Friends (animated direct-to-video)
- Les chansons d'amour (aka Love Songs)
- Men Shouldn't Sing
- Naked Boys Singing
- Never Forget (filmed production)
- Nunsensations - The Nunsense Vegas Revue (filmed production)
- Once
- Ruth (filmed production)
- Sweeney Todd: The Demon Barber of Fleet Street (horror)
- Walk Hard: The Dewey Cox Story

=== 2008 ===
- The American Mall (television film)
- Another Cinderella Story (direct-to-DVD film)
- Barbie & the Diamond Castle (animated)
- Camp Rock (television film)
- The Cheetah Girls: One World (television film)
- Forever Plaid: The Movie (filmed production)
- Great Performances: Company (filmed production)
- High School Musical: el desafío (Argentine film)
- High School Musical: el desafío (Mexican film)
- High School Musical 3: Senior Year
- Keating! (live broadcast)
- The Little Mermaid: Ariel's Beginning (animated)
- Mamma Mia!
- Rent: Filmed Live on Broadway (filmed production)
- Repo! The Genetic Opera
- Roadside Romeo (animated)
- Were the World Mine
- Where Elephants Weep (Cambodian filmed production)

=== 2009 ===
- Alvin and the Chipmunks: The Squeakquel
- Bandslam
- The Big Gay Musical
- Clear Blue Tuesday
- Fame
- Forever Plaid: The Movie
- Fruit Fly
- Hannah Montana: The Movie
- The Haunted World of El Superbeasto
- Me and My Dick (filmed production)
- Nine
- Notorious
- Passing Strange (filmed production)
- The Princess and the Frog (animated)
- Spectacular! (television film)
- Stingray Sam
- Spanish Movie (spanish film)
- Soundtrack for a Revolution
- Tigger and Pooh and a Musical Too (animated)
- A Very Potter Musical (filmed production)

== 2010s ==
=== 2010 ===
- Air: The Musical
- Basilicata coast to coast
- Burlesque
- Camp Rock 2: The Final Jam (television film)
- Guy and Madeline on a Park Bench
- Imagine This (filmed production)
- Live from Lincoln Center: South Pacific (filmed production)
- Maximum Shame
- Meshuggah-nuns! (filmed production)
- Poe (filmed production)
- Sci-Fi High: The Movie Musical (direct-to-DVD)
- Score: A Hockey Musical
- The Search for Santa Paws (direct-to-DVD film)
- Starstruck (television film)
- Tangled (animated)
- A Very Potter Sequel (filmed production)

=== 2011 ===
- Alvin and the Chipmunks: Chipwrecked
- A Cinderella Story: Once Upon a Song (direct-to-DVD)
- Country Strong
- The Dead Inside
- Elle: A Modern Cinderella Tale
- Footloose
- Glee: The 3D Concert Movie
- Happy Feet Two (animated)
- Hunky Dory
- Into the Woods (filmed production)
- Joseph (filmed production)
- Lemonade Mouth (television film)
- Mama, I Want to Sing! (direct-to-DVD)
- Memphis: Direct from Broadway (filmed production)
- The Mikado (filmed production)
- A Monster in Paris (animated)
- The Muppets
- National Theatre Live: Fela! (filmed production)
- The Phantom of the Opera at the Royal Albert Hall (live broadcast production)
- Phineas and Ferb: Across the 2nd Dimension (animated, TV film)
- Rio (animated)
- Sharpay's Fabulous Adventure (television film)
- Starship (filmed production)
- Winnie the Pooh (animated)

=== 2012 ===
- Andy X (short film)
- Barbie: The Princess and the Popstar (animated)
- The Devil's Carnival
- From Up Here (live-streamed production)
- The Ghastly Love of Johnny X
- Holy Musical B@man! (filmed production)
- I Kissed a Vampire
- Imaginaerum
- Jesus Christ Superstar: Live Arena Tour (filmed production)
- Joyful Noise
- Les Misérables
- Let It Shine (television film)
- The Mistle-Tones (television film)
- The Lorax (animated)
- Love Never Dies (filmed production)
- Nunset Boulevard (filmed production)
- Pitch Perfect
- Rags (television film)
- Rock of Ages
- Scooby-Doo! Music of the Vampire (animated)
- Sparkle
- Switchmas
- Welcome to Harlem

=== 2013 ===
- Aashiqui 2 (Indian)
- Begin Again
- Black Nativity
- Follies (French filmed production)
- Frozen (animated)
- Grease XXX: A Parody
- Inside Llewyn Davis
- Jeff Wayne's Musical Version of The War of the Worlds - Alive on Stage! The New Generation (filmed production)
- Kaleidoscope World (Philippines)
- Lovestruck: The Musical (television film)
- Merrily We Roll Along (filmed production)
- My Little Pony: Equestria Girls (animated)
- The Rooftop (Taiwanese)
- The Sapphires
- Shrek the Musical (filmed production)
- The Sound of Music Live! (television special)
- Sunday in the Park with George (French filmed production presented in English)
- Teen Beach Movie (television film)
- That Girl in Pinafore (Singaporean)
- Twisted: The Untold Story of a Royal Vizier (filmed production)
- A Very Potter Senior Year (filmed production)

=== 2014 ===
- 21 Chump Street (filmed production)
- ANI: A Parody (filmed production)
- Annie
- Bang Bang Baby
- Barbie and the Secret Door (animated)
- Billy Elliot the Musical Live (live broadcast)
- The Book of Life (animated)
- Elf: Buddy's Musical Christmas (animated television special)
- From Here to Eternity (filmed production)
- Get on Up (biographical)
- Great Performances: Porgy and Bess (filmed production)
- God Help The Girl
- Happy New Year (Indian)
- Into the Woods
- Into the Woods (French filmed production)
- Jersey Boys
- The Last Five Years
- Legends of Oz: Dorothy's Return (animated)
- Make a Move
- Muppets Most Wanted
- My Little Pony: Equestria Girls – Rainbow Rocks (animated)
- Peter Pan Live! (television special)
- Rio 2 (animated)
- Stage Fright (slasher)
- Sunshine on Leith
- Walking on Sunshine
- Waiting in the Wings: The Musical

=== 2015 ===
- Alleluia! The Devil's Carnival (horror)
- Alvin and the Chipmunks: The Road Chip
- Bad Girls: The Musical (filmed production)
- C'est si bon (South Korean)
- Daddy Long Legs (live-streamed production)
- Descendants (television film)
- Gypsy (filmed production)
- Jem and the Holograms
- Lift (filmed production)
- London Road
- Love & Mercy (biographical)
- Lucky Stiff
- The Lure (horror)
- My Little Pony: Equestria Girls – Friendship Games (animated TV film)
- Pitch Perfect 2
- Ricki and the Flash
- Rocky Horror Show Live (live broadcast)
- Straight Outta Compton (biographical)
- Strange Magic (animated)
- Teen Beach 2 (television film)
- The Trail to Oregon! (filmed production)
- The Wiz Live! (television special)

=== 2016 ===
- George Takei’s Allegiance: The Broadway Musical on the Big Screen (filmed production)
- Ballerina (animated)
- Blue Busking
- A Cinderella Story: If the Shoe Fits
- Florence Foster Jenkins (biographical)
- Grease: Live (television special)
- Hairspray Live! (television special)
- I Saw the Light (biographical)
- La La Land
- Miss Saigon (filmed production)
- Moana (animated)
- My Little Pony: Equestria Girls – Legend of Everfree (animated)
- National Theatre Live: The Threepenny Opera
- The Rocky Horror Picture Show: Let's Do the Time Warp Again (television film)
- She Loves Me (live-streamed production)
- Sing (animated)
- Sing Street
- Theater Close-Up: The Woodsman (filmed production)
- Thomas & Friends: The Great Race (animated)
- Trolls (animated)

=== 2017 ===
- 52Hz, I Love You (Taiwanese)
- All Eyez on Me (biographical)
- An American in Paris (live broadcast)
- Anna Karenina (Russian filmed production)
- Ang Larawan (Philippines)
- Beauty and the Beast
- A Christmas Story Live! (television special)
- Coco (animated)
- Descendants 2 (television film)
- Deadma Walking (Philippines)
- Dirty Dancing (television film)
- Elf the Musical (filmed production)
- Emo the Musical
- Ernest Shackleton Loves Me (live-streamed production)
- Firebringer (filmed production)
- The Greatest Showman (biographical)
- Hello Again
- Holiday Inn (filmed production)
- Jonah: The Musical (filmed production)
- Live from Lincoln Center: Falsettos (filmed production)
- Love Beats Rhymes
- My Little Pony: The Movie (animated)
- Newsies: The Broadway Musical (filmed production)
- National Theatre Live: Follies (live broadcast)
- Pitch Perfect 3
- Roxanne Roxanne
- Qaidi Band (Indian)
- Secret Superstar (Indian)
- Stuck
- Tangled: Before Ever After (animated television film)
- Thomas & Friends: Journey Beyond Sodor (animated)
- Tom and Jerry: Willy Wonka and the Chocolate Factory (animated direct-to-video)
- Trolls Holiday (animated television special)
- The Wind in the Willows (filmed production)

=== 2018 ===
- 42nd Street (live broadcast)
- Anna and the Apocalypse
- Bandstand: The Broadway Musical (filmed production)
- Basmati Blues
- Been So Long
- Bohemian Rhapsody (biographical)
- Charming (animated)
- Emma
- Everybody's Talking About Jamie (filmed production)
- Fanne Khan (Indian)
- Forever My Girl
- Freaky Friday (television film)
- Funny Girl (filmed production)
- The Grinch (animated)
- The Guy Who Didn't Like Musicals (filmed production)
- Jesus Christ Superstar Live in Concert (television special)
- The King and I (live broadcast)
- Lazarus the Motion Picture/Live Soundtrack Experience (filmed production premiered with a live band)
- The Lion (filmed production)
- Mamma Mia! Here We Go Again
- Mary Poppins Returns
- Moses (filmed production)
- A Night with Janis Joplin (filmed production)
- Paradox
- Smallfoot (animated)
- A Star Is Born
- Still Waiting in the Wings
- Stuck
- The Toxic Avenger: The Musical (filmed production)
- Zombies (television film)

=== 2019 ===
- Aladdin
- Cats
- Count Orlov the Musical (Russian filmed production)
- Descendants 3 (television film)
- The Dirt (biographical)
- Frozen II (animated)
- Guava Island
- Gully Boy (Indian)
- Kinky Boots (filmed production)
- The Lego Movie 2: The Second Part (animated)
- The Lion King (animated/photorealistic)
- Noah (filmed production)
- A Piece of My Heart
- Rent: Live (television special)
- Rocketman (biographical)
- Pieces of String (filmed production)
- Playmobil: The Movie (animated)
- Samson (filmed production)
- The SpongeBob Musical: Live on Stage! (television special)
- Steven Universe: The Movie (animated)
- UglyDolls (animated)
- Wise Children (filmed production)
- Yellow Rose
- Yesterday

== 2020s ==
=== 2020 ===
- Adding Machine: A Musical (filmed production)
- Barbie: Princess Adventure (television film)
- Black Friday (filmed production)
- Blowin' in the Wind (archival recording)
- Beauty and the Beast (filmed production)
- Black Is King
- Ellen Fitzhugh, Harrison David Rivers, and Ted Shen's Broadbend, Arkansas (filmed production; fundraiser)
- Curtains (archival recording; fundraiser)
- Dr. Seuss' The Grinch Musical Live! (television special)
- John Caird and Paul Gordon's Estella Scrooge
- Eugenius! (archival recording; fundraiser)
- Eurovision Song Contest: The Story of Fire Saga
- Fame: The Musical (filmed production)
- Flowers for Mrs. Harris (filmed production)
- The Flying Lovers Of Vitebsk (live-streamed production)
- Frozen, A Musical Spectacular (filmed production)
- The Grinning Man (filmed production)
- Hamilton (filmed production)
- Jesus (filmed production)
- Jingle Jangle
- Marry Harry
- The Midnight Gang (filmed production)
- No One Called Ahead
- Ode to Passion
- Only the Brave (filmed production)
- Over the Moon (animated)
- Peter Pan: A Musical Adventure (filmed production)
- Pride & Prejudice (filmed production)
- The Prom
- Queen Esther (filmed production)
- Rockin' Down Fairytale Lane (filmed production)
- Shakespeare's Shitstorm
- Stellaluna the Musical (archival recording)
- Tangled: The Musical (filmed production)
- Trolls World Tour (animated)
- A VHS Christmas Carol (virtual world premiere production)
- Wasted (archival recording)
- Xcalibur (filmed production)
- Zombies 2 (television film)

=== 2021 ===
- Annette
- Annie Live! (television special)
- Anything Goes (filmed production)
- Arlo the Alligator Boy (animated)
- Barb and Star Go to Vista Del Mar
- Being Earnest (virtual world premiere production)
- Breathe: Portraits from a Pandemic (virtual world premiere production)
- Burning Man: The Musical
- Cinderella
- Come from Away (filmed production)
- Darlin' Cory (filmed production)
- Dear Evan Hansen
- Jim Henson's Emmet Otter's Jug-Band Christmas (filmed production)
- Encanto (animated)
- Everybody's Talking About Jamie (biographical)
- Gatsby: The Musical (live-streamed production)
- In the Heights
- John & Jen (filmed production)
- The Loud House Movie (animated)
- Montecristo: The Musical Live (South Korean filmed production)
- Mooseltoe (filmed production)
- Rak of Aegis (Filipino archival recording)
- Ratatouille the Musical (virtual world premiere production)
- Respect (biographical)
- Sing 2 (animated)
- The Sorcerer's Apprentice (filmed production)
- Tick, Tick... Boom! (biographical)
- VHS Christmas Carol Live! (filmed production)
- Vivo (animated)
- A Week Away
- West Side Story
- Wuthering Heights (filmed production)

=== 2022 ===
- 13: The Musical
- 1660 Vine
- Better Nate Than Ever
- Blue's Big City Adventure
- The Bob's Burgers Movie (animated)
- Chandramukhi (Indian)
- Cockroaches and Cologne
- Cyrano
- David (filmed production)
- Disenchanted
- Elvis (biographical)
- For You, Paige: The TikTok Musical (live-streamed production)
- Guillermo del Toro's Pinocchio (animated)
- Heathers: The Musical (filmed production)
- Hollywood Stargirl
- Lyle, Lyle, Crocodile
- The Magic Flute
- Matilda the Musical
- Monster High: The Movie (television film)
- On the Come Up
- One Piece Film: Red (animated)
- Phantom (South Korean filmed production)
- Pinocchio
- Please Baby Please
- Scrooge: A Christmas Carol (animated)
- Sneakerella
- Some Like It Hip-Hop (filmed production)
- Spirited
- Tomorrow Morning
- Weird: The Al Yankovic Story (biographical)
- Whitney Houston: I Wanna Dance with Somebody (biographical)
- Zombies 3 (television film)

=== 2023 ===
- The Archies
- Bernadette of Lourdes: The Musical (French filmed production)
- Carmen
- The Color Purple
- Dicks: The Musical
- Les Filles du Roi
- Flora and Son
- Frankenstein (filmed production)
- The Golden Cage (filmed production)
- Hex (filmed production)
- Journey to Bethlehem
- Ladybug & Cat Noir: The Movie (animated)
- Leo (animated)
- The Little Mermaid
- Monster High 2 (television film)
- Mother of All Shows
- Mummies (animated)
- Nerdy Prudes Must Die (filmed production)
- Perfect Life (filmed production)
- The Prince of Egypt (filmed production)
- RIDE: A New Musical (filmed production)
- Sense and Sensibility (filmed production)
- Something in the Game: An All-American Musical (filmed production)
- Titanic: The Musical (filmed production)
- Trolls Band Together (animated)
- Under the Boardwalk (animated)
- La Usurpadora: The Musical
- VHS Christmas Carols (filmed production)
- Waitress: The Musical (filmed production)
- Wish (animated)
- Wonka
- Workin' Boys (short film)

=== 2024 ===
- A Complete Unknown
- Affections (Chilean)
- Better Man
- Between the Lines (filmed production)
- Sight & Sound Presents: Daniel LIVE (live broadcast)
- The Deb
- Descendants: The Rise of Red (television film)
- Emilia Pérez
- The End
- Glitter & Doom
- Golden Lotus (filmed production)
- Gray Land (short film)
- Joker: Folie à Deux
- Kiss Me, Kate (filmed production)
- The Little Big Things (filmed production)
- Mean Girls
- Moana 2 (animated)
- Mufasa: The Lion King
- Ribbit: A Green New Musical
- Scrooge's Cape Cod Christmas Carol
- Spellbound (animated)
- Spermageddon (animated)
- Thelma the Unicorn (animated)
- This is Me...Now: A Love Story
- VHS Christmas Carols (filmed production)
- Walk on Through: Confessions of a Museum Novice (filmed concert production; released posthumously)
- Wicked

=== 2025 ===
- Bat Out of Hell: The Musical (filmed production)
- Blue Moon
- Cinderella's Castle (filmed production)
- David (animated)
- Frozen: The Hit Broadway Musical (filmed production)
- Gabby's Dollhouse: The Movie
- Juliet & Romeo
- KPop Demon Hunters (animated)
- Kiss of the Spider Woman
- Great Performances (filmed productions):
  - Girl from the North Country
  - Next to Normal
- The Lost Colony (filmed production)
- Merrily We Roll Along (filmed production)
- Sight & Sound Presents: Noah LIVE (live broadcast)
- SIX The Musical Live! (filmed production)
- Smurfs (animated)
- Snoopy Presents: A Summer Musical (animated)
- Snow White
- Song Sung Blue (biographical)
- Springsteen: Deliver Me from Nowhere
- Starwalker
- The Testament of Ann Lee
- The Wave
- Wicked: For Good
- Zombies 4: Dawn of the Vampires (television film)

=== 2026 ===
- Camp Rock 3 (television film)
- Descendants: Wicked Wonderland (television film)
- Don't Say Good Luck
- Great Performances (filmed productions):
  - Suffs
  - Top Hat
- The Guy Who Didn't Like Musicals: REPRISED! (filmed production)
- Hadestown: The Musical (filmed production)
- Jeena Dil Se
- London Road (filmed production)
- Michael (biographical)
- Moana
- Kadhal Reset Repeat
- Persimmon of My Love
- Power Ballad

== Forthcoming ==
=== 2026 ===
- Tomb Quest (filmed production; late 2026)

=== 2027 ===
- Bad Fairies (animated)
- Hidden Heroes: A Descendants Story (television film)
- Frozen 3 (animated)
- High in the Clouds (animated)
- Zombies 5: Secrets of the Sea (television film)

=== 2028 ===
- Oh, the Places You'll Go! (animated)

== See also ==
- List of Bollywood films
- List of highest-grossing Bollywood films
- List of highest-grossing musical films
- List of musicals filmed live on stage
- List of notable musical theatre productions
- List of operettas
- List of rock musicals
