= Dan Mertzlufft =

American musical theatre composer

Daniel Mertzlufft
- Born: Florida
- Education: State University of New York at Potsdam
- Website: https://danielmertzlufft.com

Daniel Mertzlufft is an American musical theatre composer and arranger best known as a creator of Ratatouille the Musical on TikTok.

== Early life and education ==
Mertzlufft was born in Florida. Because he was a "military baby," he moved around a lot. He spent a majority of his childhood in Germany, his family then moved to Las Vegas, before settling in Buffalo, New York.

He also graduated summa cum laude in 2015 from the State University of New York at Potsdam with double majors in music education and composition.

== Career ==
Mertzlufft wrote the first full TikTok musical, "For You, Paige," in 2019, starring Andy Cohen, which was commissioned by Tiktok and simultaneously broadcast on TikTok and at a "secret" Broadway theater. Mertzlufft talked with NBC news about the difficulties in 'preserving the evergreen aspects of making a musical while also being conscious of how quickly trends move'.

Variety explains the plot of For You, Paige; "In “For You, Paige” (a pun on TikTok’s "For You Page"), teen music nerd Landon (played by Roman Banks) collaborates with his best friend, Paige (played by Sri Ramesh) on a TikTok song inspired by her favorite book series. Landon’s TikTok goes viral, thrusting him into the spotlight – and leaving Paige behind. When a producer offers Landon the opportunity to adapt the book series into a musical, Landon discovers that the glory of doing it all himself isn’t worth the stress and enlists the help of Paige (and the TikTok community) to turn the show into a success."

Kelly McCarthy of Good Morning America called Mertzlufft a "creative genius". NPR said he "breaks the internet with his TikTok Broadway sendups." His debut single was called "In My Head." Mertzlufft's TikTok video Grocery Story has received over 4.6 million views, and has prompted other users to create hundreds of duets of it. BuzzFeed wrote of the latter, "not to oversell this story, but it is epic."

Mertzlufft created a theatrical cover of Louisa Melcher's New York Summer and posted it on TikTok. The post went viral and created a long chain of people duetting the video and adding their own harmonies, characters, and additions to the stories.

In early 2020, James Corden called Mertzlufft "brilliant," regarding his TikTok covers and parodies, and asked him to write a song for The Late Late Show. Corden then invited Mertzlufft on The Late, Late Show where Corden surprised him, having Josh Gad, Kristin Chenoweth, Patti LuPone, Audra McDonald and Josh Groban perform 'Thanksgiving the Musical' that Mertzlufft had written.

He was one of the creators of Ratatouille the Musical, which debuted in January 2021 online during the COVID-19 pandemic, starring Titus Burgess, Wayne Brady and Adam Lambert. Mertzlufft served as music supervisor, as well as an arranger and songwriter. The musical raised 2 million dollars for The Actors Fund, making it the most successful fundraiser in Actors Fund history.

He is featured in the Museum of Broadway. He has had works performed at 54 Below in New York City. His Construction Site on Christmas Night, commissioned by the Bay Area Children's Theatre, was performed in Sunnyvale, California, during the Christmas holiday season of 2019. Julie Benko performed a song by Mertzlufft in 2023. Mertzlufft, alongside writers Tom Kitt and Andrew Lippa, judged the Write Out Loud contest for emerging musical theater writers in 2023. Mertzlufft wrote the show Grumpy Monkey, which was performed at the Pasadena Playhouse in 2024.

Mertzlufft is a member of the BMI advanced workshop. It was there that he met lyricist Kate Leonard, frequent collaborator and a co-writer on For You, Paige and Ratatouille the Musical.

== Personal life ==
Mertzlufft identifies as gay and, in 2021 wrote The Meaning of Pride in celebration of Pride Month with a music video featuring Nina West.

Mertzlufft lives in New York City.

== Awards ==
- SUNY Potsdam Alumni Association Rising Star Award, 2021
- ASCAP Foundation Harold Adamson Lyric Awards for musical theatre.
- Webby Awards, Honoree for Social Experimental & Innovation 2023 for the Musical "For You, Paige."
