= Kate Leonard =

American lyricist and librettist

- Born: Rochester, New York
- Education: Wellesley College
- Occupations: Lyricist; librettist
- Notable work: Ratatouille the Musical
- Website: yourfriendkate.com

Kate Leonard is an American lyricist and librettist known for her work in musical theatre. She wrote lyrics for Ratatouille the Musical (2021) and co-created TikTok's first commissioned musical, For You, Paige (2022).

== Early life and education ==
Leonard is originally from Rochester, New York, and she graduated magna cum laude from Wellesley College.

== Career ==
=== Ratatouille the Musical ===
In late 2020, the Ratatouille musical trend on TikTok was developed into an official one-time streaming concert to benefit the Actors Fund. Although Kate Leonard was not one of the original creators, she was brought onto the creative team to serve as lyricist for the project. She wrote the lyrics for the song Remember My Name, which was described as an "I Want" song for Remy. She also worked with composer Daniel Mertzlufft to turn Emily Jacobsen's 15-second song, Ode To Remi, into a full musical number.

The musical premiered on January 1, 2021, starring Tituss Burgess as Remy, Andrew Barth Feldman as Alfredo, and others like Adam Lambert, Wayne Brady, Ashley Park, Kevin Chamberlain, and André De Shields filling out the cast. The production also raised $2 million for charity. It was nominated for an Emmy Awards and won a People's Voice Webby Award in the Social Video Category.

=== For You, Paige: The TikTok Musical ===
After the success of Ratatouille the Musical, TikTok commissioned a fully produced original musical titled For You, Paige, which premiered via live stream on the platform in April 2022. The show, which is a one-act musical about a teen whose TikTok goes viral, was created by Daniel Mertzlufft and Kate Leonard, with both of them working on the book, lyrics, and music together.

=== Other Projects ===
In addition to her TikTok musicals, Leonard has worked on several other songwriting and theatrical projects:

- Breathe: Portraits from a Pandemic (2021)
  - Breathe consists of five interlinked short musicals about life during the COVID-19 pandemic, each by a different writing team. Leonard once again partnered with Mertzlufft and together they wrote the segment "Aches." Leonard provided the lyrics and Mertzlufft provided the music. The show premiered as a streaming event with performers like Kelli O'Hara and Brian Stokes Mitchell, and was later released as a cast recording and licensed for performance.
- Dot & the Kangaroo JR. (2023)
  - Dot & the Kangaroo JR. is a youth musical written by Leonard (lyrics), Mertzlufft (music), and Daniel Stoddart (book). The show is adapted from Ethel Pedley's classic 1899 Australian children's novel. Dot & the Kangaroo JR. premiered in a preview at the 2023 Junior Theater Festival in Atlanta and was subsequently added to Music Theatre International's Broadway Junior catalog in 2024.
- House Rules (Upcoming)
  - Leonard and Mertzlufft collaborated on the currently unreleased musical, House Rules. It was adapted from Jodi Picoult's novel of the same name. House Rules has been in development through readings and workshops; excerpts from the show were presented in early 2021 as part of New York Theatre Barn's New Works Series.

=== Other Work ===
Outside of musical theatre, Leonard has experience in television and comedy. She worked as a TV script coordinator for series including Netflix's House of Cards and Hulu's The Looming Tower, assisting the writing and production process for those dramas. She also hosted a monthly improv variety show at The People's Improv Theater (The PIT). in New York City.

== Personal life ==
Leonard is based in New York City.

== Awards ==
- People's Voice award in the Social Video category for Television & Film (Web Awards)
  - For Ratatouille the Musical
