= A Great Awakening =

2026 film by Joshua Enck

- Theatrical release poster
- Directed by: Joshua Enck
- Written by: Jeff Bender; Jonathan Blair; Joshua Enck
- Produced by: Steve Buckwalter; Troy Thorne
- Starring: Jonathan Blair; John Paul Sneed
- Cinematography: Steve Buckwalter
- Edited by: Jordan K. Graff
- Production company: Sight & Sound Films
- Distributed by: Roadside Attractions
- Release date: April 3, 2026
- Running time: 129 minutes
- Country: United States
- Language: English
- Box office: $8.1 million

A Great Awakening is a 2026 American historical drama film directed and written by Joshua Enck. The film follows the friendship between George Whitefield and Benjamin Franklin, and Whitefield's impact during the Great Awakening religious movement.

The film was released in the United States on April 3, 2026, by Roadside Attractions.

== Plot summary ==
Benjamin Franklin, at the time of the Constitutional Convention, reminisces about his life and his long friendship with George Whitefield. The two had met when Whitefield preached in Philadelphia, and Franklin was astonished how far Whitefield's voice could carry. Whitefield partnered with Franklin in publishing many of his sermons. The last time they were together, Whitefield made a strong appeal to Franklin to trust in Jesus Christ for salvation. Franklin as a deist did not accept the divinity of Christ in that moment. But as he remembers Whitefield's words in 1789, he does turn to God in Christ and then goes on to call the Constitutional Convention to pray to God. Franklin's speech to the Convention promoting prayer is described in Concordia University's reconstruction of the Convention's daily debates.

== Cast ==
- John Paul Sneed as Benjamin Franklin
- Jonathan Blair as George Whitefield
- Josh Bates as Alexander Hamilton
- Stephen Foster Harris as William Blount
- Zac Johnson as Caleb Strong
- Matt Meyer as Robert Yates
- Russell Dean Schultz as George Washington

== Production ==
This is the second feature film produced by Sight & Sound Films. Principal photography took place in Lancaster County, including in Ronks and East Earl Township. Sight & Sound received $2.6 million in tax credits from the Pennsylvania Film Office, with the company expected to bring $10.4 million into the regional economy while creating and supporting 846 jobs.

== Release ==
On September 30, 2025, Roadside Attractions acquired the distribution rights to the film, and released it on April 3, 2026, coinciding with the 250th anniversary of the signing of the United States Declaration of Independence, as well as Sight & Sound's 50th anniversary.

== Reception ==
On the review aggregator website Rotten Tomatoes, 69% of 16 critics' reviews are positive, with an average rating of 5.9/10. Audiences polled by CinemaScore gave the film a rare average grade of "A+" on an A+ to F scale.

== See also ==
- Benjamin Franklin in popular culture
- Constitutional Convention
