= David Engel (actor) =

American singer, actor and dancer

David Engel (born 1959) is an American Broadway singer, actor and dancer.

== Biography ==
=== Career ===
Engel is a six-time winner of the Ovation Awards given out by the Los Angeles Stage Alliance. He has performed on the Tonight Show, the Royal Variety Performance before Queen Elizabeth II, and co-hosted the Presidential Inaugural Gala at the Kennedy Center.

=== Theater ===
Engel has been in numerous Broadway and Off-Broadways productions. He created (and starred) the role of Hanna from Hamburg in the original production of La Cage aux Folles. Engel has had an extensive career performing in regional theatre productions of musicals including Six Dance Lessons In Six Weeks at Laguna Playhouse, The Addams Family at Gateway Playhouse, and Mamma Mia! at Patchogue Theatre. He has also directed many productions.

=== Film ===
In 2009 he appeared in the movie in Forever Plaid: The Movie (directed by Stuart Ross). He played the role of "Smudge" in this movie, a role which he created himself for the original New York City production of Forever Plaid. He first appeared on film in 1982 in The Best Little Whorehouse in Texas (film), in 2001 in New Port South, and in 2006 in the shorts Zombie Prom and The Albino Code.

Engel is the creator and director of the MGM/UA Home Video "Logo-Fanfare" which heads every video release. He directed and produced That's Entertainment III, a documentary featuring scenes from classic MGM musical films.

=== Personal life ===
Engel is married to director Larry Raben. They met during the original production of Forever Plaid in 1989 and have frequently worked together in the years since.
