= JJ Niemann =

Broadway performer and influencer

- Born: June 23, 1995 (age 31); Annapolis, Maryland
- Education: Elon University
- Occupation: Actor • performer • social media influencer
- Years active: 2017–present
- Notable work: The Book of Mormon; Hamilton; Back to the Future: The Musical; Catch Me If You Can

JJ Niemann is an actor, performer, and social media content creator. His Broadway career includes appearances in Hamilton, Back to the Future: The Musical, The Book of Mormon, regionally in Catch Me If You Can and Footloose, and currently Off-Broadway in Midnight at the Daryl Roth Theatre.

== Early life ==
Niemann was born in Annapolis, Maryland, and grew up in Wilmington, North Carolina. During a summer theatre production, one of his directors encouraged him to pursue acting professionally, which led him to audition for college musical theatre programs. He graduated from Elon University in 2017 with a Bachelor of Fine Arts.

== Career ==
=== Broadway and theatre ===
Three days after graduating from college, Niemann booked a swing role in the Broadway production of The Book of Mormon, covering all seven ensemble tracks. He made his debut in July 2017 and remained full-time with the production until December 2019. Since leaving the company, he has periodically returned as a vacation and emergency swing.

In June 2022, Niemann performed as Doody in Grease at the Cape Playhouse in Dennis, Massachusetts. That same year, he also played Sky in Mamma Mia! at the Flat Rock Playhouse.

In 2023, Niemann performed in the ensemble of the Paper Mill Playhouse production of Hercules. Later that year, he joined the original Broadway cast of Back to the Future as an ensemble member and understudy for both Marty McFly and George McFly.

In February 2024, Niemann participated in a workshop for the upcoming Broadway musical Smash, based on the TV show of the same name.

He joined the Broadway cast of Hamilton as Charles Lee/Ensemble in February 2025, and remained with the company until August of the same year. He starred as Frank Abagnale, Jr. in Catch Me If You Can at the Marriott Theatre in the fall of 2025. He was also nominated for a Jeff Award (Chicago Theatre Awards) for his leading performance.

In April of 2026, JJ portrayed the role of Buck Waller in The Dust Bowl Radio Hour concept album. Later that year, Niemann starred as Ren McCormack in Footloose at the Flat Rock Playhouse.

In September 2026, Niemann opened the new musical Midnight by Todrick Hall Off-Broadway at the Daryl Roth Theatre as Ensemble M1 and the cover for Richard. On October 9, he made his principal debut as Richard.

=== Social media ===
Niemann is a leading #BroadwayTok content creator, with more than one million followers as of January 2025. His videos include behind-the-scenes looks at his life in the theatre, as well as comedy and dance content. He is well known for his "Broadway actors with their mics on/off" series.

In December 2020, Niemann virtually participated in Ratatouille: the TikTok Musical with other Broadway stars, including Andrew Barth Feldman, Andre De Shields, and Tituss Burgess. The virtual performance raised funds for COVID-19 relief.

Niemann still continues to post on social media to this day, with currently over two million followers across his platforms on Instagram, TikTok, and YouTube.

== Personal life ==
Niemann is openly gay.
