= Westcoast Black Theatre Troupe =

A non-profit Black Theater

- Sign for the Westcoast Black Theatre Troupe at 1012 N. Orange Avenue in Sarasota, Florida
- Founded: 1999
- Founder: Nate Jacobs
- Headquarters: Sarasota, Florida, United States
- Website: Official website

The Westcoast Black Theatre Troupe (WBTT) is a nonprofit theater, located in Sarasota, Florida. In 2022, the WBTT gained national attention for "inclusion" while concurrently representing African-American history and the greater Black community. WBTT productions have been highlighted and reviewed in national publications including The New York Times and The Wall Street Journal.

The theater company was founded by actor/producer/director Nate Jacobs who continues to serve as artistic director and received the Larry Leon Hamlin award in August 2022 for his contribution to Black Theater Julie Leach has been the company's executive director since her 2015 appointment.

After spending much of its first fifteen years in temporary, rental spaces, in 2017, WBTT began work on a new, larger space on their campus which opened in 2020 with a production of Caroline or Change. Among their most well-known productions is Black Nativity, which they first performed in 2003.

The WBTT has been a longstanding community member within a predominately white demographic, and thus enjoys a diverse audience and patronage. WBTT promotes theater to youngsters through local scholarships.
