= Ratatouille the Musical =

Crowdsourced musical based on the 2007 Disney/Pixar film

- Official poster, designed by Jess Siswick
- Music: Danny K. Bernstein; Gabbi Bolt; Kevin Chamberlin; RJ Christian; Nathan Fosbinder; Emily Jacobsen; Sophia James; Katie Johantgen; Daniel J. Mertzlufft; Alec Powell; Blake Rouse
- Lyrics: Danny K. Bernstein; Gabbi Bolt; Kevin Chamberlin; RJ Christian; Nathan Fosbinder; Emily Jacobsen; Sophia James; Katie Johantgen; Kate Leonard; Daniel J. Mertzlufft; Alec Powell; Blake Rouse
- Book: Michael Breslin; Patrick Foley
- Setting: Paris, France
- Basis: Ratatouille by: Brad Bird; Jan Pinkava; Jim Capobianco
- Premiere: January 1, 2021: TodayTix (virtual)
- Productions: 2021 Virtual Benefit Concert

Ratatouille the Musical (also known as Ratatouille: The TikTok Musical, or Ratatousical) is an Internet meme and crowdsourced musical based on the 2007 Disney/Pixar film Ratatouille. TikTok user Emily Jacobsen created a short comedic song in tribute to Remy, a rat with a talent for cooking and the main character of the film, in August 2020. This led to another TikTok user, Daniel Mertzlufft, arranging Jacobsen's tribute as if it were a finale to a Disney musical. From there, additional TikTok users continued to add to Mertzlufft's video to envision a full musical, including a playbill, scenic design, choreography, and more songs. In December 2020, Seaview Productions announced a charity benefit concert presentation of the musical. The benefit concert was streamed for 72 hours beginning on January 1, 2021, followed by an encore presentation on January 10, 2021. In total, the production raised $2 million for The Actors Fund and had 350,000 total viewers.

== Development ==
During the COVID-19 pandemic, users of the social media app TikTok collaborated on musical numbers based on unconventional subjects, such as a grocery store. Earlier in 2020, TikTok users shared cooking videos accompanied by "Le Festin", a song from the Disney/Pixar film Ratatouille. Eventually TikTok users created parodies, including videos of lackluster cooking accompanied by a parody of "Le Festin" with fake French words. In August 2020, Emily Jacobsen, an elementary school teacher, recorded an ode to Remy, the film's main character, among other TikTok video odes to fictional characters. The song went viral after Brittany Broski, a user with millions of followers, reused the music. Two months later, in October, another user, Daniel Mertzlufft, who had previously achieved fame for his "grocery store musical" composition, adapted and arranged the short song as a Disney musical finale. He composed the orchestration in Logic Pro X using software instruments he associated with Disney musicals—particularly the finale of The Hunchback of Notre Dame—including tremolo strings, French horn, trumpet, brass, timpani, and tubular bells. This video received over a million views and spawned thousands of subsequent TikTok videos in a collaboration between theater students and professionals expanding on the possibility of a Disney musical based on the Ratatouille film.

Subsequent videos repurposed prior contributions, such as the "Ode to Remy" lyrics and orchestration, to add new elements, like set design, choreography, and a playbill designed by artist Jess Siswick. Using the TikTok "Duet" feature, users added vocal tracks atop each other to develop musical numbers. One of the most popular songs is a duet between Colette and Linguini sung by between Blake Rouse and Acacia Pressley, composed by Rouse called 'Ratatouille Tango'. Others developed new numbers, such as "The Life of a Rat (Trash Is Our Treasure)" and "A Rat Is a Rat Is a Rat". One contributor, R.J. Christian, created songs for multiple characters in the style of Alan Menken. American Broadway actor Andrew Barth Feldman of Dear Evan Hansen performed a song. Users created a central hub for the collaboration with 200,000 followers by mid-November 2020. Disney Channel and Broadway actor, Kevin Chamberlin, even contributed a song titled "Anyone Can Cook" based on the catchphrase of the original film.

Disney responded to the fan activity with a video of Disney Channel actor Milo Manheim performing a submission for the musical at the site of a Ratatouille-themed ride at Walt Disney World.

== Benefit concert ==
Although we do not have development plans for the title, we love when our fans engage with Disney stories. We applaud and thank all of the online theatre makers for helping to benefit The Actors Fund in this unprecedented time of need.

– Disney's statement regarding the musical and benefit concert

On December 9, 2020, it was announced that Seaview Productions would present a filmed concert version of the musical on January 1, 2021, with the event benefitting The Actors Fund. The original creators of the TikTok videos, including Jacobsen, Mertzlufft, Christian, Rouse, Pressley and Chamberlin would all participate in the concert, with Six co-creator and co-director Lucy Moss directing. Michael Breslin and Patrick Foley adapted the film and TikToks into the musical's libretto, with Mertzlufft serving as music supervisor, Macy Schmidt as Orchestrator, Emily Marshall as music director, and Ellenore Scott choreographing. The concert was co-executive produced by Jeremy O. Harris. Siswick's poster design was used for the production. Live entertainment marketing agency Marathon Digital handled the concert's marketing campaign.

At the end of December, the cast was announced, including Wayne Brady as Django, Tituss Burgess as Remy, Kevin Chamberlin as Gusteau, Andrew Barth Feldman as Linguini, Adam Lambert as Emile, Priscilla Lopez as Mabelle, Ashley Park as Colette, André De Shields as Anton Ego, Owen Tabaka as Young Anton Ego, and Mary Testa as Skinner. Ensemble members included Adrianna Hicks, Cori Jaskier, Raymond J. Lee, John Michael Lyles, Courtney Mack, Mallory Maedke, JJ Niemann, Samantha Pauly, Talia Suskauer, Anna Uzele, Nikisha Williams, and Joy Woods. The 20-piece all-female, majority women-of-color Broadway Sinfonietta orchestra performed the music. The concert featured cameo appearances from ABC News reporter Sandy Kenyon as the TV news anchor who announces Gusteau's death and A Strange Loop's Larry Owens as a news reporter. Breslin and Foley also cameo as reporters.

A sneak peek performance of one of the new songs written for Remy in the concert, "Remember My Name", was released on December 30, 2020. The preview was performed by Mertzlufft, who adapted the song with Kate Leonard from Jacobsen's original "Ode to Remy" and is the "I Want" song of the concert. A virtual red carpet pre-show was held on the day of the performance, hosted by Kristolyn Lloyd (Dear Evan Hansen) and Luka Kain (South Pacific, Saturday Church). Tickets to the performance was sold on a "contribute what you can" basis, ranging from US$5 to US$100 each. On January 9, 2021, it was announced that an encore presentation of the musical would be streamed for free on TikTok, with donations to the Actors Fund encouraged, on January 10, 2021. The performances raised over $2 million for The Actors Fund and featured a 350,000 total viewers.

== Cast and characters ==
Character	Benefit concert (2021)
Remy	Tituss Burgess
Alfredo Linguini	Andrew Barth Feldman
Colette Tatou	Ashley Park
Chef Skinner	Mary Testa
Django	Wayne Brady
Emile	Adam Lambert
Auguste Gusteau	Kevin Chamberlin
Anton Ego	André De Shields
Mabel	Priscilla Lopez
Young Anton Ego	Owen Anthony Tabaka

== Musical numbers ==
1. "Overture" – Orchestra (Written by Alec Powell)
2. "Anyone Can Cook" – Gusteau, Remy, and Ensemble (Music and lyrics by Kevin Chamberlin; additional material by Daniel Mertzlufft)
3. "Trash Is Our Treasure" – Django (Music and lyrics by Gabbi Bolt)
4. "Remember My Name" – Remy (Music by Mertzlufft; lyrics by Kate Leonard)
5. "Anyone Can Cook (Reprise)" – Linguini (Music and lyrics by Nathan Fosbinder)
6. "Kitchen Tango" – Colette and Linguini (Music and lyrics by Blake Rouse)
7. "Rat's Way of Life" – Emile, Remy, and Ensemble (Music and lyrics by Rouse)
8. "I Knew I Smelled a Rat" – Skinner (Music and lyrics by Sophia James)
9. "Ratatouille" – Ego (Music and lyrics by R.J. Christian)
10. "Ego's Flashback" – Ego and Young Ego (Music and lyrics by Danny K. Berstein and Katie Johantgen)
11. "Finale" – Company (Music and lyrics by Emily Jacobsen and Mertzlufft)
12. "Ratamix" – Company (Arranged by Mertzlufft)

== Reception and influence ==
Ashley Lee of the Los Angeles Times initially braced for a lower-budget presentation, but her skepticism waned after the end of the overture and first number. Highlighting the performances of Brady, Park, and Burgess, Lee added, "Without any slick sets, naturalistic props or costars who are even in the same room, their playful performances were still so inventive and full of story — theater, at its core." As for the songs, she felt they "genuinely celebrate the compositional conventions of musical theater and animated Disney movies, and feel as if they’re written by those who truly love them". Lee also applauded Daniel Mertzlufft's work on giving the different songs a cohesive arrangement despite being written by different people. Lee concluded that she hoped the benefit concert would encourage theater creators and fans to "seek out and embrace its undiscovered voices". Viewers particularly praised Brady for his commitment to the concert and role.

Kim Lyons of The Verge said "It did not have all the glitz and glamour of a high-end Broadway production, but the caliber of the performances given from their homes by the actors, musicians, and dancers (yes, even a kick line!) are top-notch." The New York Times theater critic Jesse Green gave it a mostly positive review, praising the songs, but criticizing the book, mainly its reliance on Remy's narration. He also thought that the haste that the show was created in has kept it shallow. He concluded by saying, "There may be too many chefs, but they offer, as one character puts it, 'just the right amount of cheese.'" Bob Verini gave the production four star in his review for New York Stage Review. He praised the cast, particularly feeling De Shields was "an ideal replacement for Peter O'Toole’s silky food critic Anton Ego", but criticized Park's French accent. Verini also noted those unfamiliar with the film could lose key elements of the plot, such as why and how Remy hides inside Linguini's toque and did not like that Burgess had to rely on cue cards, but added that was understandable given the time constraints. He hoped the production had a future as a full production, stating "Visually and emotionally, the material has a lot more to offer than many another previously adapted animated epic."

The creation of the musical has inspired singer-songwriter Abigail Barlow and composer Emily Bear to write songs for a theorized musical adaptation of the Netflix series Bridgerton.

In 2021 Webby Awards, the musical won the People's Voice award in the Social Video category for Television & Film.
