= Sight & Sound Theatres =

American Christian live entertainment company

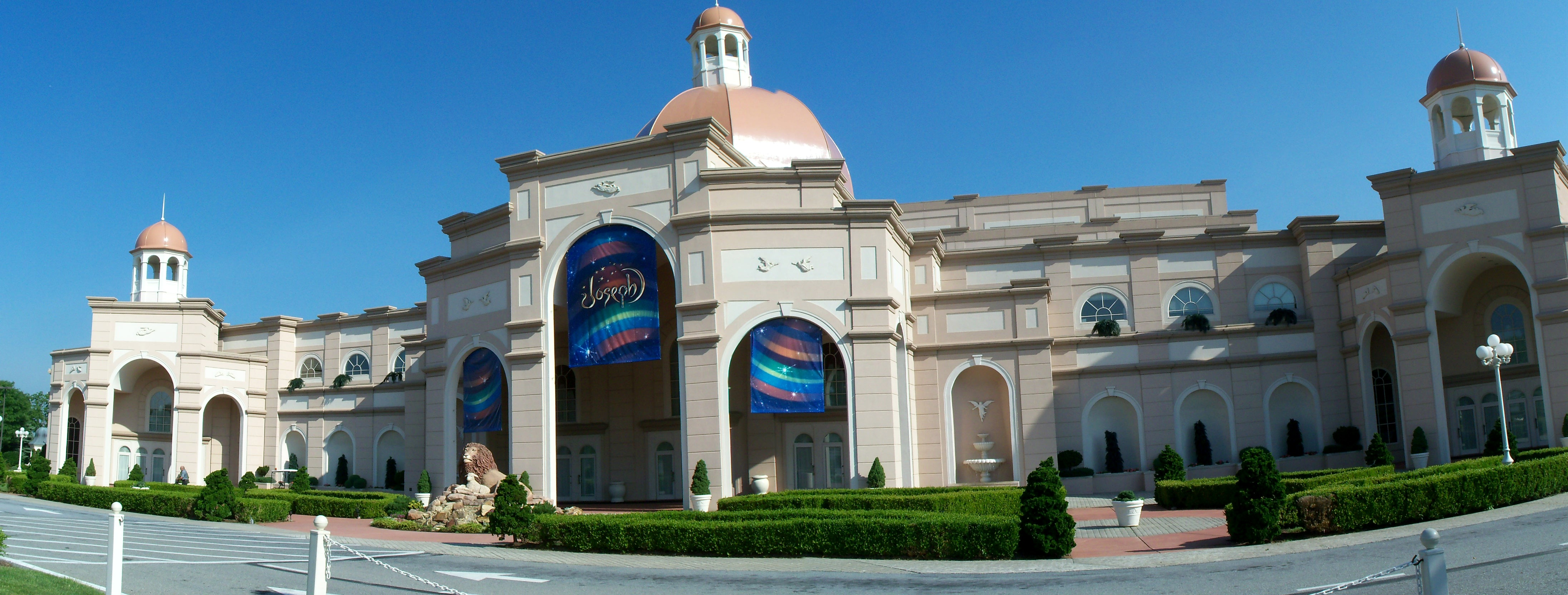
The Sight & Sound Theatre in Lancaster, Pennsylvania, taken in June 2010

Sight & Sound Theatres is an entertainment company that produces Bible stories live on stage. Based in Lancaster County, Pennsylvania, Sight & Sound operates two theaters: one in Ronks, Pennsylvania (formerly known as the Millennium Theatre) and the second in Branson, Missouri. Each year, more than a million people from around the world attend performances at the theatres. It has been a major tourist attraction of Pennsylvania's Lancaster County, and is considered the largest faith-based theater company in the nation.

== Company ==
Founded in 1976 by Glenn and Shirley Eshelman, the company remains a family-owned business. The company currently has over 800 employees.

The company's name, "Sight & Sound," was inspired by Jesus's words in Matthew 13:10-23 regarding parables: when asked by disciples why he spoke to people in parables and stories, Jesus stated that although people were seeing, they did not truly see; and even though they were hearing, they did not really hear or understand.

Sight & Sound's productions feature stories from the New and Old Testaments. A new performance is produced every other year. The company rotates productions seasonally, and the productions also travel between the two theatres. The performances feature stories, songs, music, elaborate costumes, large detailed sets, trained animals, and special effects. For each production, the company casts around 50 actors and actresses nationwide.

== History ==
Glenn and Shirley Eshelman started Sight & Sound in the summer of 1976, with a 10-week multimedia show The Wonder of It All in an auditorium rented from Lancaster Bible College. Based on that success, they built the original Sight & Sound Auditorium (renamed to Living Waters Theatre) on Pennsylvania Route 896 in Ronks, Pennsylvania. In July 1976, the Sight & Sound Auditorium opened for the performance of A Land of Our Own. Live actors and actresses were eventually added to the productions, and Behold the Lamb debuted as the first full-length live stage production at the original Sight & Sound Auditorium in 1987. A larger facility, the Sight & Sound Entertainment Centre opened in March 1991.

However, after the success of their productions Noah and the premiere run of The Miracle of Christmas, the Entertainment Centre caught fire in January 1997, destroying the facility and most of the costumes and sets that were stored in the shops. The Living Waters Theatre was renovated to accommodate live stage productions until another large theater, originally called The Millennium Theater, was opened on September 1, 1998. The new theatre featured more than 2,000 seats, a 300-foot (91 m) wraparound stage that can hold sets up to 40 feet high, and improved audio and visual effects.

Sight & Sound opened a second theater in Branson, Missouri, in 2008, a near identical twin facility to the newest facility in Lancaster County, Pennsylvania. The company creates all of its own set work in a shop in the back of the theater complex.

Matt Neff and Josh Enck, sons-in-law of Glenn Eshelman, became the company's co-presidents in 2011. In 2015, Neff became the chief executive officer and Enck was named the president and continued to be the chief creative officer.

== Film production ==
On July 17, 2022, Sight & Sound announced that they will be expanding to filmmaking through a production company named Sight & Sound Films. Their first film, I Heard the Bells, released in theaters in December 2022, in partnership with Fathom Events. The film was based on events from the life of American poet Henry Wadsworth Longfellow and his poem "Christmas Bells", which became Christmas carol "I Heard the Bells on Christmas Day." Lancaster-based video production company MAKE/FILMS was one of Sight & Sound's key partners for the film.

Sight & Sound's marketing director stated in June 2022 that the company's decision to produce movies was sparked by searching for new ways to tell stories. The idea first emerged around 2018 or 2019, but the company did not start filming until January 2021.

After the film I Heard the Bells was released in December 2022, it exceeded expectations. Originally a three-day event, the film's run in theaters extended to two months with additional locations due to high demand, resulting in $5.6 million in box office sales. Sight & Sound partnered with Pinnacle Peak Pictures and Universal Pictures Home Entertainment releasing I Heard the Bells via Digital and DVD on November 14, 2023.

A second film, A Great Awakening, based on the life of George Whitefield, was released on April 3, 2026.

== Streaming platform ==
Sight & Sound TV, an associated streaming service, was launched in 2020 and offers filmed versions of past productions for online viewing. In September 2020, Queen Esther debuted on this platform after its live performances were cancelled due to the pandemic.

== Productions ==
=== Inaugural Show ===
- The Wonder of It All: 1978

=== Shows at Living Waters Theatre (Originally Sight & Sound Auditorium) ===
- A Land of Our Own: 1976
- Behold the Lamb: 1987–2006
- The Glory of Spring: 1997–?
- Celebrate America: 1997–?
- Abraham and Sarah: A Journey of Love: 2000–2004, 2008–2009
- Psalms of David: 2005–2007, 2010

=== Shows at Sight & Sound Entertainment Centre ===
- The Eternal Flame: 1991–1994
- Noah: 1995–1996
- Miracles of Christmas: 1996

=== Shows at Millennium Theatre in Lancaster, PA ===
- Noah - The Musical: 1998–2001, 2004, 2013, 2025
- The Miracle of Christmas: 1999–2011, 2013, 2015, 2017, 2019, 2023
- Behold The Lamb: 2000–2001, 2004–2006, 2009
- Daniel & The Lion's Den: 2002–2003, 2008
- Ruth: 2005–2006
- In the Beginning: 2007–2009
- Joseph: 2010–2011, 2015
- Jonah: 2012, 2017, 2027
- Moses: 2014–2015, 2023
- Samson: 2016
- Jesus: 2018–2019
- Queen Esther: 2020–2021
- David: 2022
- Daniel: 2024
- Joshua: 2026

=== Shows in Branson, Missouri ===
- Noah – The Musical: 2008–2011, 2020
- The Miracle of Christmas: 2008–2011, 2013, 2017, 2019, 2022, 2024, Upcoming 2026
- Joseph: 2012–2013
- Jonah: 2014–2015
- Moses: 2016–2017
- Samson: 2018–2019
- Jesus: 2021–2022
- Queen Esther: 2023–2024
- David: 2025-2026
- Daniel: 2027

=== Fathom Events ===
- Jonah: 2017
- Moses: 2018
- Noah: 2019
- I Heard the Bells: 2022
- Daniel: 2024
- Noah Live: 2025
