= Kevin Chamberlin =

American actor (born 1963)

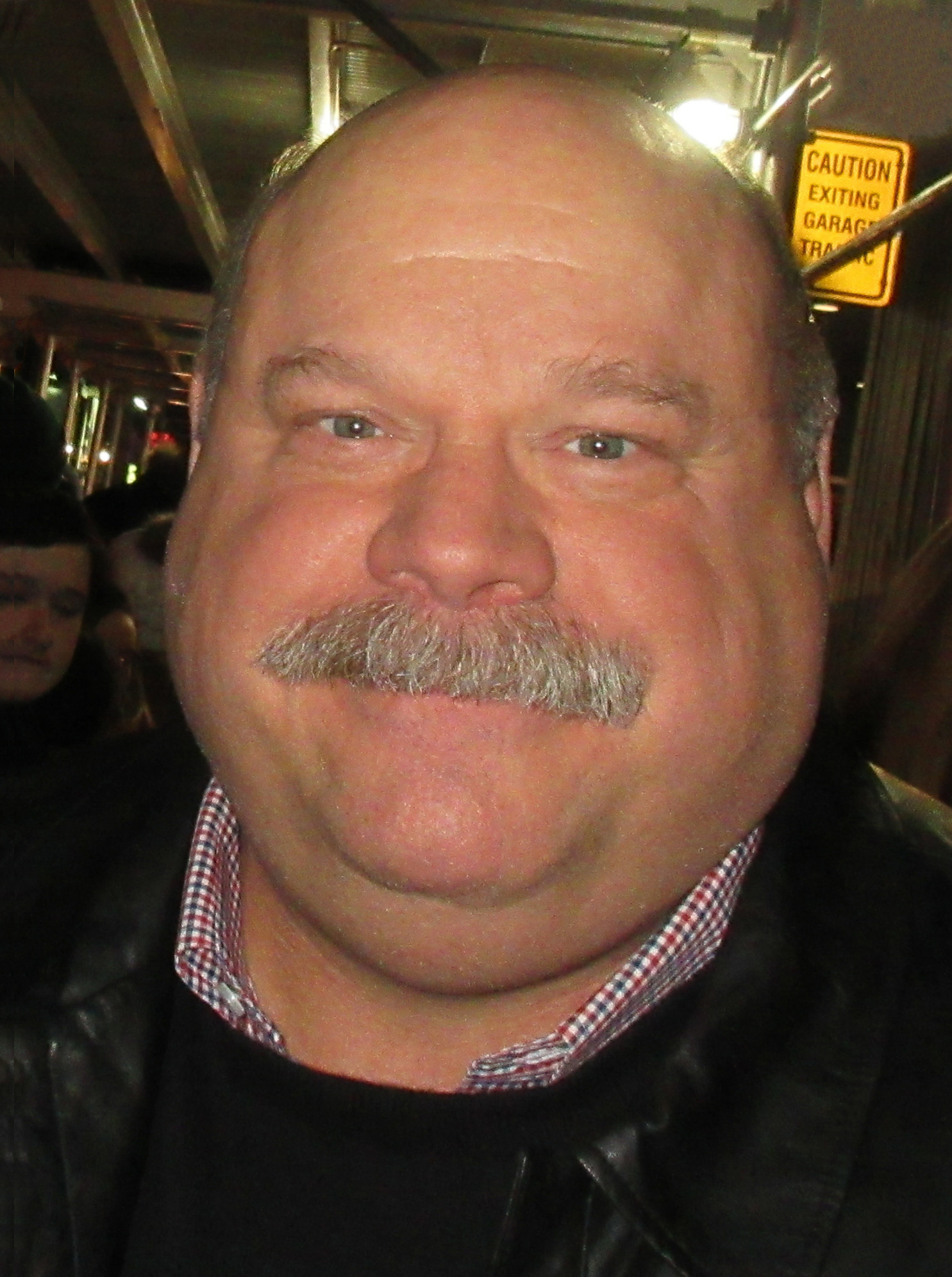
- Chamberlin in 2019
- Born: Seth Kevin Chamberlin; November 25, 1963 (age 62); Baltimore, Maryland, U.S.
- Education: Rutgers University, New Brunswick (BFA)
- Occupation: Actor
- Years active: 1985–present
- Spouse: Michael Gans (m. 2008)

Seth Kevin Chamberlin (born November 25, 1963) is an American actor and singer. He is known for his theatre roles such as Dimas in Triumph of Love, Horton in Seussical, and Uncle Fester in The Addams Family. For his theatre work, he was nominated for three Tony Awards and three Drama Desk Awards. On television, he starred as Bertram Winkle in the Disney Channel Original Series sitcom Jessie from 2011 until 2015. From 2018 to 2019, he starred as The Wizard of Oz in Wicked on Broadway.

== Early life ==
Chamberlin was born on November 25, 1963, in Baltimore, Maryland, and was raised in Moorestown, New Jersey. He first performed on stage at seven years old. In elementary school, he starred as Huck Finn in the school's production of Tom Sawyer. After he graduated from Moorestown High School in 1981, Chamberlin studied acting at Rutgers University's Mason Gross School of the Arts in New Brunswick, New Jersey, and graduated with a B.F.A. in acting in 1985. Chamberlin has since acted on Broadway, having been nominated for three Tony Awards.

== Career ==
Chamberlin made his Broadway debut in 1992 in My Favorite Year. Chamberlin has been nominated for Drama Desk and Tony Awards for Dirty Blonde (as Charlie), Seussical (as Horton), and The Addams Family (as Uncle Fester). In 1997, he started as Dimas in Triumph of Love. Additional Broadway theatre credits include Abe Lincoln in Illinois, Chicago, The Ritz and Wicked.

Chamberlin appeared in Die Hard with a Vengeance as an enthusiastic NYPD bomb defusal expert. He also appeared in the 1999 film Trick. In Lucky Number Slevin, he again had a supporting role as a New York police officer. Chamberlin's television work includes the role of Aron Malsky in the NBC prime-time series Heroes as well in a Law & Order: Special Victims Unit episode titled "Redemption" where he played a man named Roger Berry. He was also a guest on the sitcom Frasier, in season 10 episode 13. Chamberlin previously appeared as Uncle Fester in the musical The Addams Family, a role for which he won a Broadway.com Audience Award for Favorite Performance By a Featured Actor in a Broadway Musical. Brad Oscar replaced him in the role of Uncle Fester on March 8, 2011. Chamberlin also starred as Dr. Fusion in Teen Beach Movie, a Disney Channel Original Movie starring Ross Lynch, Maia Mitchell, Barry Bostwick, and Steve Valentine which aired July 19, 2013.

In 2019, Chamberlin appeared as Mr. Mushnik in the Pasadena Playhouse production of Little Shop of Horrors alongside George Salazar, Mj Rodriguez, Amber Riley and Matthew Wilkas.

In 2020, Chamberlin was one of the many TikTok users who created an Internet meme of a musical version of the 2007 Disney/Pixar film Ratatouille. On December 28, 2020, it was announced that Chamberlin would star as Gusteau in a benefit concert presentation of the musical. The concert streamed exclusively on TodayTix on January 1, 2021.

In 2022, Chamberlin appeared as Nicely-Nicely Johnson in Guys and Dolls at the John F. Kennedy Center for the Performing Arts. He starred opposite James Monroe Iglehart, Jessie Mueller, Steven Pasquale, and Phillipa Soo. Chamberlin received a Helen Hayes Award for his performance.

In 2025, Chamberlin returned to the New York City stage performing his solo show Finding the Joy, with a one-night only show at the Laurie Beechman Theatre on June 23. It was produced by Chamberlin alongside his husband Michael Gans and music director Michael Orland.

== Personal life ==
Chamberlin is gay. He has been married to TV writer and producer Michael Gans since 2008; they have been together since 1991. They split their time between New York City and Los Angeles.

== Filmography ==
=== Film ===
Year	Title	Role	Notes
1995	Die Hard with a Vengeance	Charles Weiss	
1997	In & Out	Carl Mickley	
1998	Letters from a Killer	Cutler	
1999	Trick	Perry's Ex	
2001	Herman U. S. A.	Wayne	
2002	Road to Perdition	Frank the Bouncer	
2004	Suspect Zero	Harold Speck	
2004	Christmas with the Kranks	Mr. Scanlon	
2005	Bound by Lies	Gus Boyle	Direct-to-DVD film
2005	Loudmouth Soup	Charlie Baker	
2006	Lucky Number Slevin	Marty	
2006	Queer Duck: The Movie	Additional Voices (voice)	Direct-to-DVD film
2007	The Girl Next Door	Officer Jennings	
2008	Sorry	Hitman	Short film
2009	Taking Woodstock	Jackson Spiers	
2012	Possessions	Keith	
2013	Meat and Potatoes	Charlie	Short film
2014	Lucky Stiff	Fred Mahew III	
2014	Silent Shadows	Victor	Short film
2016	Internet Famous	Larry Trambone	
2017	Irving	Irving	Short film
2017	The Emoji Movie	Gavel (voice)	
2019	Wonder Park	Uncle Tony (voice)	
2019	The Nightmare Gallery	Dr. Stockton	
2019	Trouble	James (voice)	
2020	The Prom	Sheldon	
2021	Ratatouille: The TikTok Musical	Auguste Gusteau	
2023	The Zombie Wedding	Buddy Bob Morgan	

=== Television ===
Year	Title	Role	Notes
1991	Reading Rainbow	Ted the Grateful Head	Episode: "The Lady with the Ship on Her Head"
1992	ABC Afterschool Specials	Referee	Episode: "Summer Stories: The Mall - Part 3"
1994	Ghostwriter	Audubon Poulet	4 episodes
1995	New York News	Victor	Episode: "Fun City"
1999	Earthly Possessions	Policeman	TV movie
2001	Law & Order: Special Victims Unit	Roger Berry	Episode: "Redemption"
2001–2002	Ed	Mr. Bronkowski	2 episodes
2003	Without a Trace		Episode: "Hang on to Me"
2003	Frasier	Guy in Waiting Room	Episode: "Lilith Needs a Favor"
2003	Kingpin	Cat Man	Episode: "The Odd Couple"
2003	Nip/Tuck	Dr. Pendelton	Episode: "Mandi/Randi"
2003	According to Jim	Wallace	Episode: "The Lemonade Stand"
2004	It's All Relative	Wayne	Episode: "Cross My Heart"
2004	The D.A.	Prosecutor Eams	Episode: "The People vs. Sergius Kovinsky"
2005	Crossing Jordan	Neville	Episode: "You Really Got Me"
2005	Listen Up	Dave	Episode: "Tony Whine-Man"
2005	Jake in Progress	Carl	3 episodes
2005	Inconceivable	Lenny	2 episodes
2005	Sex, Love & Secrets	Momma	5 episodes
2006	Crumbs	Massage Client	Episode: "Pilot"
2006	The Valley of Light	Moody	TV movie
2006	CSI: NY	Patient No. 1 / The Flash	Episode: "Super Men"
2006	So Notorious	Lionel	Episode: "Canadian"
2006	Twenty Good Years	Bailiff	Episode: "Pilot"
2007	Heroes	Aron Malsky	3 episodes
2007	State of Mind	Fred Smedresman	8 episodes
2009	Better Off Ted	Mr. Crisp	Episode: "Father, Can You Hair Me?"
2010	Late Show with David Letterman	Uncle Fester	Episode: "Episode #17.117"; uncredited
2011–2015	Jessie	Bertram Winkle	Main cast; directed 4 episodes
2012	Austin & Ally	Bertram Winkle	Episode: "Austin & Jessie & Ally All Star New Year: Part 2"
2013	Teen Beach Movie	Dr. Fusion	Disney Channel Original Movie
2015	Modern Family	Dr. Monty Lemon	Episode: "The Verdict"
2015	Where the Bears Are	Beach Minister	Episode: "Bears at Sea, Part 2"
2015	A Christmas Melody	Thomas	Hallmark Channel Original Movie
2016	Bunk'd	Bertram Winkle	Episode: "Griff Is in the House!"
2017	Grace and Frankie	Frank	3 episodes
2017	Training Day	Bill Marks	Episode: "Tunnel Vision"
2018	A Series of Unfortunate Events	Man in Plaid Pants	2 episodes
2019	Team Kaylie	Anton	Episode: "Wax On, Wax Off"
2022	Outer Range	Karl Cleaver	2 episodes
2022	The Really Loud House	Phillip "Flip" Phillipini	2 episodes
2023	A Really Haunted Loud House	Phillip "Flip" Phillipini	Television film
2025	Duster	Bob Temple	5 episodes

=== Music videos ===
Year	Title	Role	Artist	Notes
2014	Disney's Circle of Stars: Do You Want to Build a Snowman?	Self	Various Artists	

== Stage credits ==
Theater work
Year	Title	Role	Location	Notes
1992	My Favorite Year	Ensemble u/s Herb Lee u/s Sy Benson	Vivian Beaumont Theatre, Broadway	Original cast
1993	Abe Lincoln in Illinois	Cavalry Captain / Feargus / Ensemble u/s Sturveson	Vivian Beaumont Theatre, Broadway	Original cast
1996	One Touch of Venus	Stanley	New York City Center	Encores!
1997	Triumph of Love	Dimas	Royale Theatre, Broadway	Original cast
1998	Chicago	Amos Hart	Ambassador Theatre, Broadway	Replacement
1998	Li'l Abner	Senator Jack S. Phogbound	New York City Center	Encores!
1999	Ziegfeld Follies of 1936	Performer	New York City Center	Encores!
2000	Dirty Blonde	Charlie and others	Helen Hayes Theatre, Broadway	Original cast Nominated – Tony Award for Best Featured Actor in a Play
2001	Seussical	Horton the Elephant	Richard Rodgers Theatre, Broadway	Original cast Nominated – Tony Award for Best Actor in a Musical
2002	Merrily We Roll Along	Charley Kringas	Freud Playhouse	Concert
2004	Company	David	Freud Playhouse	Regional
2006	Chicago	Amos Hart	Shubert Theatre, Broadway	Replacement
2007	Stairway to Paradise	Performer	New York City Center	Encores!
2007	The Ritz	Gaetano Proclo	Studio 54, Broadway	Original cast
2008–2009	Chicago	Amos Hart	Ambassador Theatre, Broadway	Replacement
2008–2009	Chicago	Amos Hart	National tour	Original cast
2009–2010	The Addams Family	Uncle Fester	Oriental Theater, Chicago	Pre-Broadway Regional Tryout
2010–2011	The Addams Family	Uncle Fester	Lunt-Fontanne Theatre, Broadway	Original cast Nominated – Tony Award for Best Featured Actor in a Musical
2014	Hair	Dad	Hollywood Bowl, California	Regional
2015	Spamalot	Sir Bedevere / Dennis's Mother / Concorde	Hollywood Bowl, California	Regional
2016	Disaster!	Maury	Nederlander Theatre, Broadway	Original cast
2016	West Side Story	Lt. Schrank / Doc / Officer Krupke	Hollywood Bowl, California	Regional
2017	The New Yorkers	Jimmie Deegan	New York City Center	Encores!
2018–2019	Wicked	The Wonderful Wizard of Oz	Gershwin Theatre, Broadway	Replacement
2018	Parade	Luther Rosser / Mr. Peavy	Roundabout Theatre Company	Workshop
2019	High Button Shoes	Mr. Pierre Pontdue	New York City Center	Encores!
2019	Little Shop of Horrors	Mr. Mushnik	Pasadena Playhouse, California	Regional
2019	Let 'Em Eat Cake	Vice President Alexander Throttlebottom	Carnegie Hall	Concert
2021	Ratatouille: The TikTok Musical	Auguste Gusteau	-	Online concert
2022	Guys and Dolls	Nicely-Nicely Johnson	Kennedy Center, Washington, D.C.	Regional
2023	The Frogs	Xanthias	Lincoln Center	Concert
2024	Anything Goes	Moonface Martin	The Muny	Regional
2026	When Playwrights Kill	The Director	Huntington Theatre Company	

== Awards and nominations ==
Year	Award	Category	Work	Result
2000	Tony Award	Best Featured Actor in a Play	Dirty Blonde	Nominated
2000	Drama Desk Award	Outstanding Actor in a Play	Dirty Blonde	Nominated
2001	Tony Award	Best Actor in a Musical	Seussical	Nominated
2001	Drama Desk Award	Outstanding Actor in a Musical	Seussical	Nominated
2010	Tony Award	Best Featured Actor in a Musical	The Addams Family	Nominated
2010	Drama Desk Award	Outstanding Featured Actor in a Musical	The Addams Family	Nominated
2010	Outer Critics Circle Award	Outstanding Featured Actor in a Musical	The Addams Family	Nominated
2023	Helen Hayes Award	Outstanding Performer in a Visiting Production	Guys and Dolls	Won
