= Persimmon of My Love =

Persimmon of My Love The King of My Love
- Directed by: Maryus Vaysberg
- Written by: Vitaly Kolomytsev; Vladislav Lutsenko; Armen Poghosyan; Evgeny Ilyin
- Produced by: Lika Blank; Tina Kandelaki; Arkady Vodakhov; Marina Razumova; Boris Khanchalyan; Sergey Kosinsky; Vsevolod Zharov; Alina Zinnatullina; Aleksey Titov; Asmik Movsisyan; Olesya Lubotskaya; Semyon Shcherbovich-Vecher; Ivan Kalashnikov; Elizaveta Anistarova; Anastasia Mitina; German Segura; Tatyana Yuferova; Maria Pugacheva; Aleksandra Kivaylo; Sergey Volkov; Olga Kuptsova; Yulia Gubankova; Yulia Migunova; Demis Karibidis; Mikhail Galustyan; Vitaly Kolomytsev; Aleksandr Vyalykh
- Starring: Demis Karibidis; Mikhail Galustyan
- Cinematography: Denis Alarcon Ramirez
- Music by: Zurab Matua; Oddie Neumel; Nikita Savelyev
- Production companies: My Way Studio; TNT-teleset; Cinema Foundation of Russia
- Distributed by: Central Partnership
- Release date: April 1, 2026 (Russia)
- Running time: 111 minutes
- Countries: Russia; India
- Language: Russian
- Budget: ₽608 million
- Box office: ₽236 million

Persimmon of My Love, also in English territories titled as The King of My Love (Russian: Королёк моей любви) is a 2026 Russian-Indian musical action parody film directed by Maryus Vaysberg. The idea was conceived by Demis Karibidis, who also co-wrote the script. The film is a parody of Indian cinema, a project of the TNT channel. The film stars comedians Demis Karibidis and Mikhail Galustyan as two brothers separated in childhood, set against a backdrop of Mumbai and Rajasthan.

Persimmon of My Love was released in Russia by Central Partnership on April Fools' Day 2026.

== Plot ==
In the fictional Indian city of Khurmada, peace and order prevail thanks to the noble police officer Ramash (Demis Karibidis). However, the tranquility is shattered by the appearance of the greedy bandit Shamar (Mikhail Galustyan), who orchestrates a series of crimes. During their confrontation, it is revealed that Ramash and Shamar are brothers separated in childhood. They team up to investigate the causes of the fire that killed their parents. The investigation leads them to Khurmada's main philanthropist and patron, Sandurlay (Artur Vakha), whom the brothers must face in battle.

== Cast ==
- Demis Karibidis as Ramash, a noble, strong, and beloved police officer. His character maintains order in the city of Khurmada (English: Hurmada), protects the weak, and fights crime.
- Mikhail Galustyan as Shamar, a dangerous and embittered criminal who commits a series of crimes in the city but turns out to be the brother of the noble police officer, Ramash.
- Albina Kabalina as Jita, a policewoman
- Artur Vakha as Sandurlai
- Lyudmila Artemyeva as the Indian abbess
- Sergey Rost as the Indian police chief
- Adila Ragimova as Shallti
- Viktor Zakharov as Shallti's father
- Aleksandr Bugin as Fartukh, a boy
- Vasant Balan as Pereobush
- Vladimir Maysuradze as Prequel
- Inna Serpokryl as a female master of ceremonies
- Artyom Gulaksizov as a male compere
- Vyacheslav Timerbulatov as a chief physician

== Production ==
The film was produced by the film company "My Way Studio" with the participation of the TNT channel and financial support from the Cinema Foundation of Russia.

TNT channel producers Tina Kandelaki and Arkady Vodakhov announced that work on the project would begin in late November 2024. They revealed the information during the presentation of the upcoming 2025/2026 season. The film's concept originated with Demis Karibidis, who also co-wrote the script. Maryus Vaysberg directed the project. The original plot was developed by screenwriters Vitaly Kolomytsev, Vladislav Lutsenko, Armen Pogosyan, and Evgeny Ilyin. The film crew itself was international, drawing on specialists from various countries, including Russia, India, China, Colombia, and the United States.

=== Casting ===
The actors for some of the roles have also been announced. They include Demis Karibidis, Mikhail Galustyan, Artur Vakha, Adila Ragimova, Sergey Rost, Lyudmila Artemyeva, and Vyacheslav Timerbulatov.

=== Filming ===
Principal photography began in India in the winter of 2025, spanning several locations, including Udaipur, Mumbai, and Jodhpur. It concluded in mid-April 2025, according to TNT representatives.

At the same time, the fictional city differs somewhat from real India. It's more picture-perfect, a composite of the most picturesque locations, with ironic references to Russian culture. Viewers should be prepared for the possibility that Indian versions of Alyonka chocolate might be lurking among the crates of persimmons and spices in the street stalls.

== Music ==
The film's score was composed specifically for the film and includes compositions in several languages. The choreography was directed by Jay Kumar, known for his work on RRR.

== Release ==
=== Theatrical ===
On March 26, 2026, the star-studded premiere of the Russian-Indian film Persimmon of My Love with the participation of Karibidis and Galustyan took place at the Moscow cinema "KARO 11 October".

The film was theatrically released in the Russian Federation on April 1, 2026, by Central Partnership.
