= Forever Plaid: The Movie =

- Theatrical Poster
- Directed by: Stuart Ross
- Written by: Stuart Ross
- Based on: Forever Plaid by Stuart Ross
- Produced by: Barney Cohen; Benni Korzen; Suren Seron; Christopher Gosch
- Starring: Stan Chandler; David Engel; Larry Raben; Daniel Reichard
- Narrated by: David Hyde Pierce
- Cinematography: Christopher Gosch
- Edited by: Nicholas Allen; J.R. Lizarraga
- Music by: David Snyder
- Production companies: The Company Pictures; Hudson Pictures; Pterodactyl Productions; Stray Angel Films
- Distributed by: National CineMedia
- Release date: November 15, 2008
- Running time: 90 mins
- Country: United States
- Language: English

Forever Plaid: The Movie (also titled Forever Plaid: The 20th Anniversary Special) is a 2008 American jukebox musical film, a recording of a live performance of a revival to the 1990 Off-Broadway musical revue Forever Plaid. Written and directed by Stuart Ross, the film stars Stan Chandler, David Engel, Larry Raben, and Daniel Reichard and is narrated by David Hyde Pierce. The performance was filmed at CBS Columbia Square in Los Angeles, California. It was released by National CineMedia on July 9, 2009.

== Cast ==
- Stan Chandler as Jinx
- David Engel as Smudge
- Larry Raben as Sparky
- Daniel Reichard as Francis
- Traci Bingham as an usher (scenes deleted)
- Jo Anne Worley as an usher (scenes deleted)
- Rogina Gosch - Señorita Casabas
- David Hyde Pierce as the Narrator
