= Rosalie (musical) =

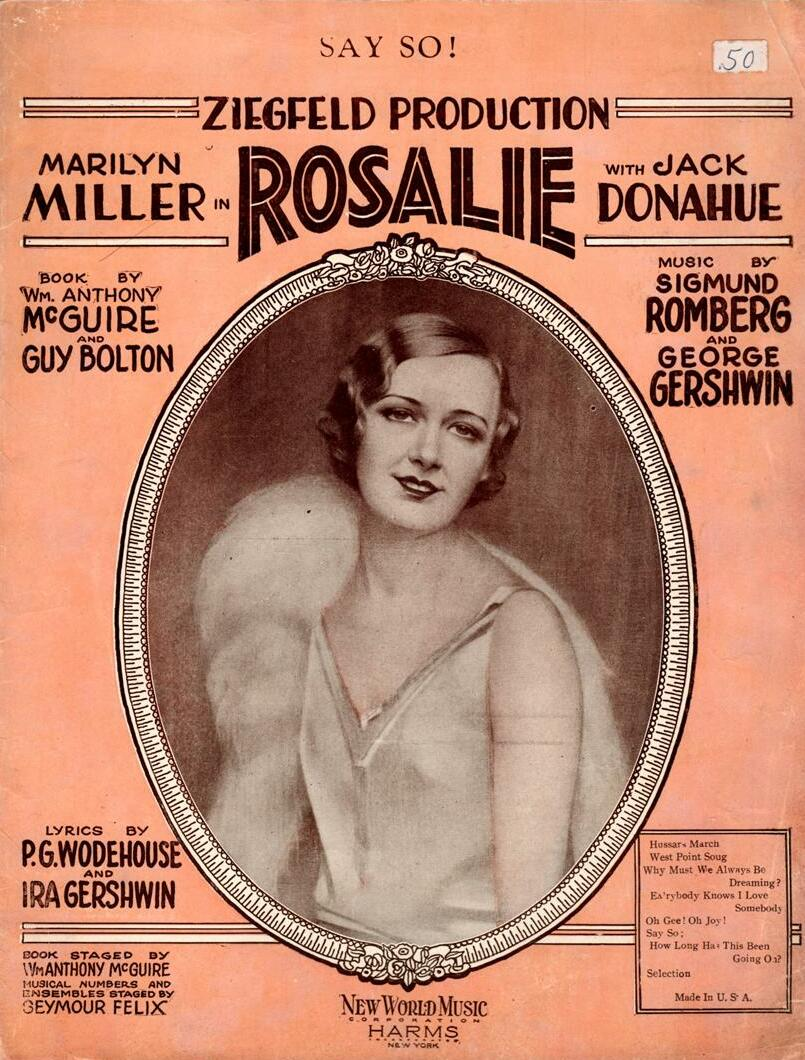
- Music: George Gershwin; Sigmund Romberg
- Lyrics: Ira Gershwin; P.G. Wodehouse
- Book: William Anthony McGuire; Guy Bolton
- Premiere: New Amsterdam Theatre, New York City: January 10, 1928
- Productions: 1928 Broadway; 1937 film

Rosalie is a musical with music by George Gershwin and Sigmund Romberg, lyrics by Ira Gershwin and P.G. Wodehouse, and book by William Anthony McGuire and Guy Bolton. The story tells of a princess from a faraway land who comes to the United States of America and falls in love with a West Point Lieutenant.

It was first produced on Broadway in 1928 at the New Amsterdam Theatre. It was adapted in 1937 as a musical film with songs by Cole Porter.

== Productions ==
=== Broadway ===
The musical, produced by Florenz Ziegfeld, premiered on Broadway at the New Amsterdam Theatre on January 10, 1928 and ran for 335 performances. Directed by William Anthony McGuire, the cast starred Marilyn Miller as the princess, Frank Morgan as her father, King Cyril, Bobbe Arnst (Mary), Margaret Dale (the Queen), and Jack Donahue. The set designer, Joseph Urban, and costume designer, John Harkrider "devised elaborate stage pictures ranging from a public square...to a West Point ballroom to a Paris nightclub." Michel Fokine choreographed the second act ballet, and there was a chorus of 64. The musical was a mixture of operetta and a 1920s musical.

=== Subsequent productions ===
Rosalie was performed in many regional theatres, including the Paper Mill Playhouse, Millburn, New Jersey in 1946 and 1948, and the St. Louis Municipal Opera (The Muny) six times between 1938 and 1960. These productions frequently used some Cole Porter songs from the film.

There was a production of Rosalie in 1957 starring Mimi Benzell, David Brooks and Henny Youngman.

The New Amsterdam Theatre Company presented a staged concert in April 1983 at The Town Hall in New York City. The New York Times reviewer noted that, without its "lavish spectacle", the musical is "the giddiest of period operetta confections, buoyed by half a dozen memorable tunes." He further wrote that two of Gershwins' strongest songs, " 'Yankee Doodle Rhythm' and 'The Man I Love,' were cut from the show before it opened on Broadway."

== Synopsis ==
Setting: Romanza, on board the S.S. Isle de France, West Point, and the Ex-Kings' Club

In the fictional kingdom of Romanza, the crowd assembles to await the arrival of the West Point flyer Lieutenant Richard Fay, coming to visit a girl whom he met in Paris. Mary O'Brien is waiting for her boyfriend, Bill, who she thinks is on the flight with Lt. Fay. When Dick and Rosalie meet, they realize they are in love ("Say So!"). Dick finds out that she is a Princess and he angrily leaves. King Cyril reluctantly goes to visit America to obtain a loan for his troubled country, accompanied by his daughter Princess Rosalie and the Queen.

Princess Rosalie visits West Point, but she is disguised. The cadets welcome the royal family ("West Point March"), and Dick and Rosalie continue their romantic relationship ("Oh Gee-Oh Joy"). However, Rosalie agrees to marry Captain Carl, whose father is a Prince, to keep Dick from being tried in court ("Kingdom of Dreams").

At a dance at West Point, Mary and Bill, who had been fighting, make up ("Ev'rybody Knows I Love Somebody"). Rosalie attends the dance, disguised as a cadet ("Follow the Drum"). Mary wonders about the feelings she has for Bill ("How Long Has This Been Going On?"). Dick and Rosalie return to Romanza and start a revolution so that her royal duties will no longer keep them apart. Exiled to Paris, Rosalie and a group of dancers perform ("The Ballet of the Flowers"), and King Cyril happily announces the engagement of Rosalie and Dick.

== Principal cast ==
Role	Performer
Mary O'Brien	Bobbe Arnst
Prince Rabisco	A. P. Kaye
King Cyril	Frank Morgan
Queen	Margaret Dale
Bill Delroy	Jack Donahue
Lieutenant Richard Fay	Oliver McLennan
Princess Rosalie	Marilyn Miller
Steward	Charles Gotthold
Captain Banner	Clay Clement
Captain Carl Rabisco	Halford Young

== Musical numbers ==
Act I

- "Opening Chorus: Here They Are" - Ensemble
- "Show Me the Town" (Gershwin) ±± - Mary and Ensemble
- "Entrance of the Hussars" (Romberg) - Hussars
- "Hussar March" (Romberg) - Rosalie and Hussars
- "Say So!" (Gershwin) - Rosalie and Dick
- "Finaletto, Scene 1" - Rosalie, Dick, and Ensemble
- "Let Me Be a Friend to You" (Gershwin) - Rosalie and Delroy
- "West Point Bugle" (Romberg) - Dick and Boys
- "West Point March" (Romberg) - Ensemble
- "Oh Gee! Oh Joy!" - (Gershwin) - Rosalie and Bill
- "Say So! (reprise)" - Delroy
- "Kingdom of Dreams" - Rosalie
- "Finale Act I" - Ensemble

Act II

- "Opening Valse" - Ensemble
- "New York Serenade" (Gershwin) - Mary and Ensemble
- "The King Can Do No Wrong" - King and Ladies
- "Everybody Knows" (Gershwin) - Mary and Bill
- "Follow the Drums" (Gershwin) ±±± - Rosalie and Ensemble
- "How Long Has This Been Going On?" (Gershwin) ± - Mary
- "Setting-Up Exercises" - Rosalie and Delroy
- "Oh Gee! Oh Joy! (Reprise and Dance)" - Lyric Quartette and Bill
- "(At) The Ex-Kings' Club" - Chancellor and Flunkeys
- "Ballet" - The Goddesses of Crystal
- "The Ballet of the Flowers" - Rosalie and Ensemble
- "Finale - Abdication (Romberg)" - Ensemble

± Originally used in Funny Face but was cut from that musical

±± Originally used in, and cut from, Oh, Kay!

±±± Added after opening, revised version of "Heaven on Earth" from Oh, Kay!.

== Reception ==
Brooks Atkinson wrote that Marilyn Miller was "engaging", but Rosalie "did not match her Sunny or the 'perfection' of Show Boat. Alexander Woollcott commented "The house holds its breath and in walks Marilyn Miller."

== Film adaptation ==
MGM produced a film version of the musical in 1937. The film follows the story of the musical but replaces most of the score with new songs by Cole Porter. MGM's top tap dancer at the time, Eleanor Powell, was cast as the princess opposite Nelson Eddy as Dick Thorpe (Lieutenant Fay in the musical). Morgan reprised his Broadway role as King Fredrick (King Cyril in the stage version). Also appearing in the film were Ray Bolger (Bill), Edna May Oliver (the Queen), Ilona Massey (Brenda) and Reginald Owen (Chancellor). Marjorie Lane dubbed the singing voice for Powell. In order to capitalize upon Powell's renown as a dancer, the film was retooled to allow her several showcase musical numbers. Songs included "In the Still of the Night". The reviewer at allmovie.com called the film an "overproduced musical extravaganza", and noted that "The flimsy plot all but collapses under the weight of Gibbons' enormous sets and dance director David Gould's ditto choreography."
