= Robert E. Dolan =

American composer

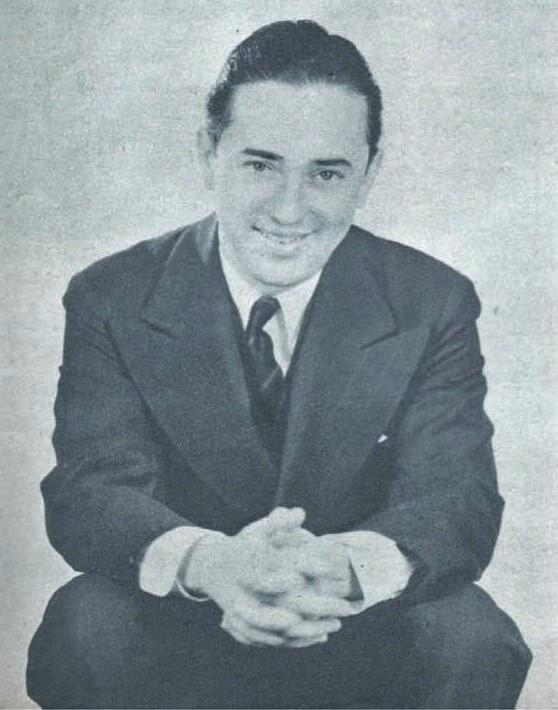
- Dolan in 1937
- Born: Robert Emmett Dolan; August 3, 1908; Hartford, Connecticut, U.S.
- Died: September 26, 1972 (aged 64); Los Angeles, California, U.S.
- Education: Loyola College
- Occupations: Conductor, composer, arranger
- Years active: 1930-1966
- Spouses: Vilma Ebsen (m. 1933; div. 1948) Nan Martin (m. 1948; div. 1970)
- Children: 2

Robert Emmett Dolan (August 3, 1908 - September 26, 1972) was a Broadway conductor, composer, and arranger beginning in the 1920s. He moved on to radio in the 1930s and then went to Hollywood in the early 1940s as a musical director for Paramount. He scored, arranged, and conducted many musical and dramatic films in the 1940s and 1950s and produced three musicals. At the end of his career, he returned to the stage – where he had begun.

== Life and career ==
Dolan was born in Hartford, Connecticut, the eldest of 12 children. He studied piano with his mother and was educated in Montreal. He received further musical education at Loyola College (now Concordia University), later studying extensively with Mortimer Wilson, Joseph Schillinger, and Ernst Toch. Dolan started out playing piano for honky-tonk dance bands and musical comedy bands, and in the 1920s began working as a musician, composer, conductor, and musical director in the theater. Some of the Broadway shows to which he contributed were Leave It To Me, Louisiana Purchase, Of Thee I Sing, and Ziegfeld Follies.

In the 1930s, he began work as a composer, conductor, and music director on radio.

He became music director for MGM in 1941 and then moved on to Paramount, where he was music director for 16 Bing Crosby pictures. He also served as composer and arranger for Ginger Rogers and Betty Hutton, and scored about 60 movies. At the end of his Paramount stay, he was promoted to producer for White Christmas (1954), The Girl Rush (1955), and Anything Goes (1956).

He joined ASCAP in 1946, often collaborating with Johnny Mercer and Walter O'Keefe in popular-song compositions. Dolan later worked in television; his work included specials and documentaries. He was a prominent member of Columbia University's music faculty, where he taught orchestration, conducting, and a film score class (based on his book, Music in Modern Media).

Dolan married and divorced twice and had one son in each marriage. His first wife was dancer Vilma Ebsen, the sister of Buddy Ebsen. They were married on June 24, 1933, and divorced in January 1948. Their son's name is Robert Emmett Dolan II, also known as Bobby Dolan Jr, who appeared in The Bells of St. Mary's (1945) as Joseph in a children's Christmas play in the film.

His second wife was actress Nan Martin. They were married on March 17, 1948, and had a son, Casey Martin Dolan.

== Death ==
Dolan died in Los Angeles on September 26, 1972, of a heart attack during his sleep. Funeral services were held there and at Columbia University in New York.

== Filmography ==
- 1941 Birth of the Blues – music composer
- 1942 Henry Aldrich Gets Glamour – music composer
- 1942 Star Spangled Rhythm – music composer, music director
- 1942 Once Upon a Honeymoon – music composer
- 1942 The Major and the Minor – music composer
- 1942 Holiday Inn – music director
- 1943 Happy Go Lucky – music director
- 1943 Dixie – music director
- 1943 Let's Face It – music director
- 1944 Going My Way – music director
- 1944 Standing Room Only – music composer
- 1944 Lady in the Dark – music composer, music director
- 1944 I Love a Soldier – music composer
- 1944 Here Come the Waves – music composer
- 1945 Bring On the Girls – music director
- 1945 The Stork Club – music director
- 1945 Salty O'Rourke – music composer
- 1945 Road to Utopia – music director
- 1945 Duffy's Tavern – music composer, music director
- 1945 Murder, He Says – music composer
- 1945 The Bells of St. Mary's – music composer
- 1945 Incendiary Blonde – music director
- 1946 Blue Skies – music director
- 1946 Cross My Heart – music composer
- 1946 Monsieur Beaucaire – music composer, music director
- 1947 Welcome Stranger – music composer
- 1947 The Trouble with Women – music composer
- 1947 Road to Rio – music director
- 1947 Dear Ruth – music composer
- 1947 The Perils of Pauline – music composer
- 1947 My Favorite Brunette – music composer, music director
- 1948 Good Sam – music composer
- 1948 Saigon – music composer, music director
- 1948 My Own True Love – music composer
- 1948 Mr. Peabody and the Mermaid – music composer
- 1949 The Great Gatsby – music composer
- 1949 Top o' the Morning – music director
- 1949 Sorrowful Jones – music composer
- 1950 Let's Dance – music director
- 1952 My Son John – music composer
- 1952 Aaron Slick from Punkin Crick – music director
- 1954 White Christmas – producer
- 1956 Anything Goes – producer
- 1957 The Three Faces of Eve – music composer
- 1959 The Man Who Understood Women – music composer

=== Broadway credits ===
- 1935 May Wine – musical director
- 1936 Forbidden Melody – musical director
- 1937 Hooray for What! – musical director
- 1938 Leave It To Me – musical director
- 1939 Very Warm for May – musical director, conductor
- 1940 Louisiana Purchase – musical director
- 1949 Texas Li'l Darlin – composer
- 1951 Not for Children – composer
- 1959 Juno – musical director
- 1959 A Loss of Roses – musical editor
- 1964 Foxy – composer
- 1969 Coco – musical director

=== Other credits ===
- 1954 Creature from the Black Lagoon – composer (one cue from Mr. Peabody and the Mermaid re-used)
- 1955 The Girl Rush – producer
- Of Thee I Sing
- Ziegfeld Follies
- Good News
- Follow Through
- Flying Colors
- Strike Me Pink
- Hot-Cha
- La Rose De France (Paris)
- "Your Heart Will Tell You So" (song)
- "At Last I'm in Love" (song)
- "Little by Little" (song)
- "Hullabaloo" (song)
- "Song of the Highwayman" (song)
- "You" (song)
- "Out of the Past" (song)
- "I Love You" (song)
- "And So to Bed" (song)
- "Glamour Waltz" (song)
- "Big Movie Show in the Sky" (song)
- "A Month of Sundays" (song)
- "Talk to Me, Baby" (song)

=== Oscar nominations ===
All 8 Nominations were for Music Scoring Awards (Scoring of a Musical Picture):

- 1941 Birth of the Blues
- 1942 Holiday Inn
- 1943 Star Spangled Rhythm
- 1944 Lady in the Dark
- 1945 The Bells of St. Mary's
- 1945 Incendiary Blonde
- 1946 Blue Skies
- 1947 Road to Rio
