= PF-9 =

PF-9 may refer to:

- BRP Diego Silang (PF-9), a frigate of the Philippine Navy
- Kel-Tec PF-9, a 9 mm handgun
- USS Pocatello (PF-9), a Tacoma-class frigate of the United States Navy
