= Broadway Melody of 1936 =

1935 film by W. S. Van Dyke, Roy Del Ruth

- Theatrical release poster
- Directed by: Roy Del Ruth
- Written by: Harry W. Conn; Moss Hart; Jack McGowan; Sid Silvers
- Produced by: John W. Considine Jr.
- Starring: Jack Benny; Eleanor Powell; Robert Taylor; Una Merkel; Frances Langford; Sid Silvers; Buddy Ebsen; Vilma Ebsen
- Cinematography: Charles Rosher
- Edited by: Blanche Sewell
- Music by: Nacio Herb Brown
- Production company: Metro-Goldwyn-Mayer
- Distributed by: Loew's, Inc.
- Release date: September 20, 1935
- Running time: 101 minutes
- Country: United States
- Language: English
- Budget: $1,062,000
- Box office: $2,871,000

Broadway Melody of 1936 is a 1935 American musical film directed by Roy Del Ruth and starring Jack Benny, Eleanor Powell, Robert Taylor, June Knight, Frances Langford, Sid Silvers, Buddy Ebsen and Vilma Ebsen (in their film debut). It was a follow-up of sorts to the successful The Broadway Melody, which had been released in 1929, although, there is no story connection with the earlier film beyond the title and some music.

The film was written by Harry W. Conn, Moss Hart, Jack McGowan and Sid Silvers. It was produced and released by Metro-Goldwyn-Mayer on September 20, 1935. It was nominated for the Academy Award for Best Picture. In New York, it opened at the Capitol Theatre, the site of many prestigious MGM premieres.

== Plot ==
Irene Foster tries to convince her high school sweetheart, Broadway producer Robert Gordon, to give her a chance to star in his new musical, but he is too busy with the rich widow backing his show. Irene tries to show Gordon that she has the talent to succeed, but he will not hire her. Things become complicated when she begins impersonating a French dancer, who was actually the invention of a gossip columnist.

== Cast ==
- Jack Benny as Bert Keeler
- Eleanor Powell as Irene Foster
- Robert Taylor as Robert Gordon
- Una Merkel as Kitty Corbett
- Sid Silvers as Snoop Blue
- Buddy Ebsen as Ted Burke
- June Knight as Lillian Brent
- Vilma Ebsen as Sally Burke
- Nick Long, Jr. as Basil Newcombe
- Robert John Wildhack as Hornblow (credited as Robert Wildhack)
- Paul Harvey as Scully
- Frances Langford as herself
- Harry Stockwell as himself

Cast notes

This was Powell's first leading role, and her first film for MGM. She would appear in the next two entries in the Broadway Melody series: Broadway Melody of 1938 and Broadway Melody of 1940. (These films were not related to each other in terms of storyline.) This also marked Ebsen's film debut. Though she was dubbed in this film by Marjorie Lane, Eleanor recorded "You Are My Lucky Star" with Tommy Dorsey and His Orchestra (Victor 25158).

Don Wilson, Jack Benny's regular announcer on The Jack Benny Program, is not credited in Broadway Melody of 1936, but his presence in the movie is evident at the beginning where he is the radio show host.

== Soundtrack ==
- "Broadway Rhythm" (1935)
  - Music by Nacio Herb Brown
  - Lyrics by Arthur Freed
  - Performed by Frances Langford
  - Performed by Buddy Ebsen, Vilma Ebsen, June Knight, Nick Long Jr., and Eleanor Powell
- "You Are My Lucky Star" (1935)
  - Music by Nacio Herb Brown
  - Lyrics by Arthur Freed; Played during the opening credits
  - Performed by Frances Langford and chorus
  - Performed by Eleanor Powell (dubbed by Marjorie Lane) and chorus
  - Performed by Roger Edens and Eleanor Powell
  - Performed by Robert Taylor and chorus
- "Broadway Melody" (1929)
  - Music by Nacio Herb Brown
  - Lyrics by Arthur Freed
  - Performed by Harry Stockwell
- "I've Got a Feelin' You're Foolin'" (1935)
  - Music by Nacio Herb Brown
  - Lyrics by Arthur Freed
  - Sung by June Knight, Robert Taylor and chorus
  - Performed by June Knight, Nick Long Jr., and chorus
  - Performed by Frances Langford
- "Sing Before Breakfast" (1935)
  - Music by Nacio Herb Brown
  - Lyrics by Arthur Freed
  - Performed by Buddy Ebsen, Vilma Ebsen, and Eleanor Powell (dubbed by Marjorie Lane)
- "All I Do Is Dream Of You" (French version) (1934)
  - Music by Nacio Herb Brown
  - Lyrics by Arthur Freed
- "On a Sunday Afternoon" (1935)
  - Music by Nacio Herb Brown
  - Lyrics by Arthur Freed
  - Performed by Buddy Ebsen and Vilma Ebsen
- "The Old Folks at Home (Swanee River)" (1851)
  - Written by Stephen Foster
  - Performed by Roger Edens

== Accolades ==
The film was nominated for three Oscars at the 8th Academy Awards: Best Picture, Best Writing (Original Story), and Best Dance Direction, winning the last one. As this film is the second in a film series (though not a direct continuation), it could be viewed as the first "sequel" to ever be nominated for Best Picture.

The film is recognized by American Film Institute in these lists:

- 2004: AFI's 100 Years...100 Songs:
  - "You Are My Lucky Star" – Nominated

== Box office ==
According to MGM records, the film earned $1,655,000 in the US and Canada and $1,216,000 elsewhere resulting in a profit of $691,000.
