= Rosalie (1937 film) =

1937 film by W. S. Van Dyke

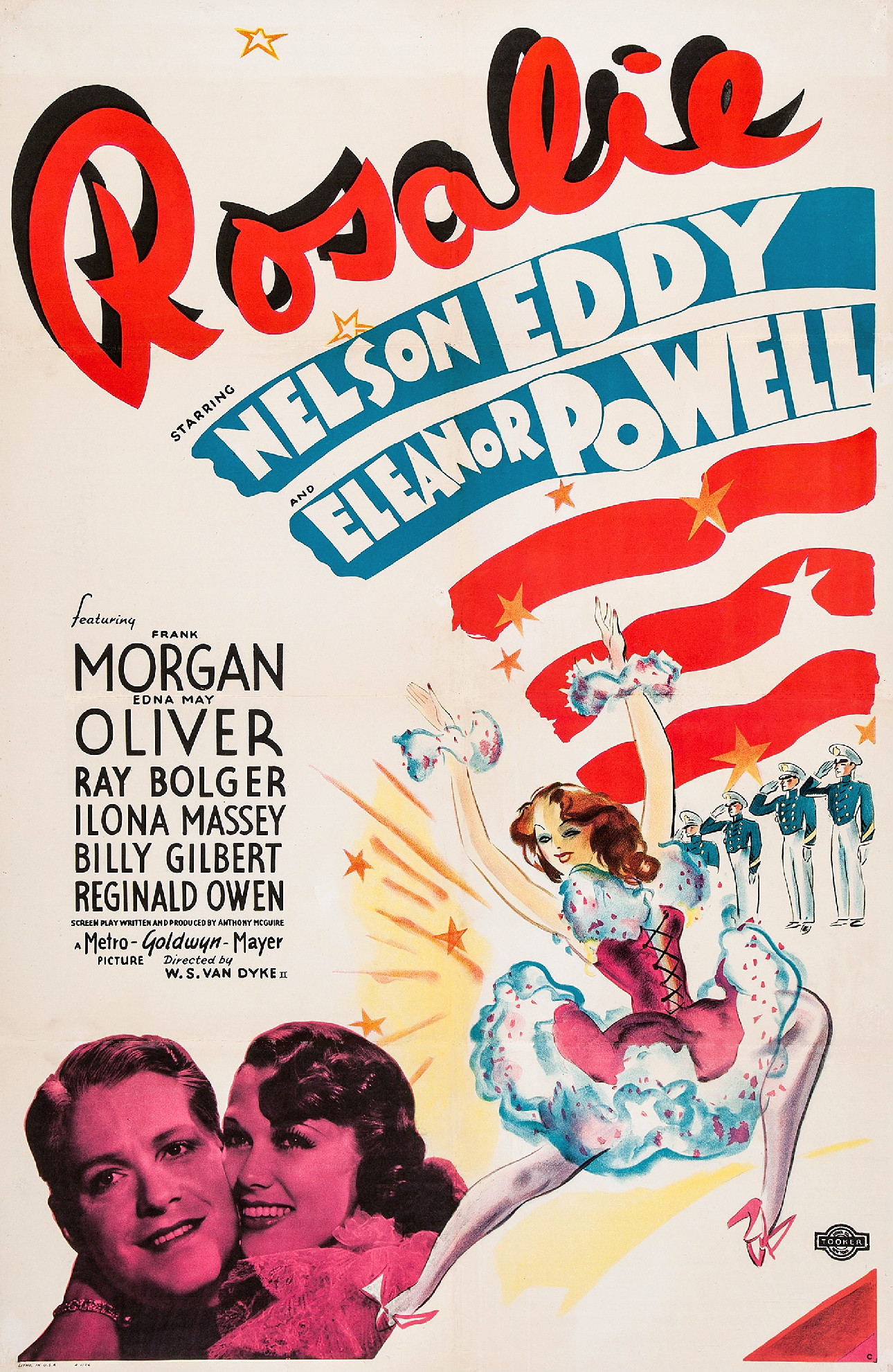
- 1937 lobby card
- Directed by: W. S. Van Dyke
- Written by: William Anthony McGuire
- Based on: Rosalie; 1928 play by Guy Bolton
- Produced by: William Anthony McGuire
- Starring: Eleanor Powell; Nelson Eddy; Frank Morgan
- Cinematography: Oliver T. Marsh
- Edited by: Blanche Sewell
- Music by: Cole Porter
- Production company: Metro-Goldwyn-Mayer
- Distributed by: Loew's Inc.
- Release date: December 24, 1937 (United States)
- Running time: 122 minutes
- Country: United States
- Language: English
- Budget: $2,096,000
- Box office: $2,879,000

Rosalie is a 1937 American musical film directed by W. S. Van Dyke and starring Eleanor Powell, Nelson Eddy and Frank Morgan. An adaptation of the 1928 stage musical of the same name, the film was released in December 1937. The film follows the story of the musical, but replaces most of the Broadway score with new songs by Cole Porter. The story involves the romantic entanglements of a princess in disguise and a West Point cadet.

== Plot ==
Dick Thorpe is a football star for the Army, and Rosalie, a Vassar student who is also a princess (Princess Rosalie of Romanza) in disguise, watches a football game. They are attracted to each other and agree to meet in her country in Europe. When Dick flies into her country, he is greeted as a hero by the king and finds Rosalie is engaged to marry Prince Paul, who actually is in love with Brenda. Dick, not knowing of Prince Paul's affections, leaves the country. The king and his family are forced to leave their troubled country, and Dick and Rosalie are finally reunited at West Point.

== Cast ==
- Nelson Eddy as Dick Thorpe
- Eleanor Powell as Rosalie
- Frank Morgan as King
- Edna May Oliver as Queen
- Ray Bolger as Bill Delroy
- Ilona Massey as Brenda
- Billy Gilbert as Oloff
- Reginald Owen as Chancellor
- Tom Rutherford as Prince Paul
- Clay Clement as Captain Banner
- Virginia Grey as Mary Callahan
- George Zucco as General Maroff
- Oscar O'Shea as Mr. Callahan
- Jerry Colonna as Joseph
- Janet Beecher as Miss Baker
- Tommy Bond as Mickey the Mascot
- Caren Marsh Doll as Dancer (uncredited)

== Reception ==
On December 31, 1937, Frank Nugent reviewed the film for The New York Times and said, “Deploying its formidable phalanxes of talent…in one of the most pretentious demonstrations of sheer mass and weight since the last Navy games, Metro-Goldwyn-Mayer brings forth…"Rosalie".”

In 2005, music historians William H. Young and Nancy K. Young observed that the film "resembles the frothy operettas then so much in vogue, which means that Rosalie lacks much of a plot ... he [Porter] managed to compose the memorable 'In the Still of the Night' and 'Who Knows?'."

The reviewer at allmovie.com calls the film an "overproduced musical extravaganza", and noted, "The flimsy plot all but collapses under the weight of Gibbons' enormous sets and dance director David Gould's ditto choreography."

The film earned $1,946,000 domestically and $933,000 foreign. However, because of the high cost of the film, it incurred a loss of $175,000.

== Production ==
MGM's top tap dancer at the time, Eleanor Powell, was cast as the princess opposite Nelson Eddy as cadet Dick Thorpe (Lieutenant Richard Fay in the stage musical). Frank Morgan reprised his Broadway role as King Fredrick (King Cyril in the stage version). Also appearing in the film were Ray Bolger (Bill Delroy), Edna May Oliver (the queen), Ilona Massey (Brenda), Tom Rutherford (Prince Paul), and Reginald Owen (Chancellor). William Anthony McGuire was the producer, with direction by W. S. Van Dyke, cinematography by Oliver Marsh, art direction by Cedric Gibbons, and choreography by Albertina Rasch. Marjorie Lane dubbed the singing voice for Powell. The dance director for the "Cadet routines" was Dave Gould.

To capitalize upon Powell's renown as a dancer, the film was retooled to allow her several showcase musical numbers, one of which is the title number with Powell dancing on top of a giant drum, one of the largest musical sequences ever filmed. Songs included "Who Knows?", "I've a Strange New Rhythm in My Heart", "Rosalie", "In the Still of the Night", and "Spring Love Is in the Air." An excerpt from this scene is included in That's Entertainment! (1974).

== Songs ==
1. "Who Knows?" - Dick
2. "I've a Strange New Rhythm in My Heart" - Rosalie
3. "Rosalie" - Dick
4. "Why Should I Care?" - King Frederic
5. "Spring Love is in the Air" - Brenda
6. "Close" [instrumental]
7. "In the Still of the Night" - Dick
8. "It's All Over But the Shouting" - Dick
9. "To Love or Not to Love" - Dick
