= Robert John Wildhack =

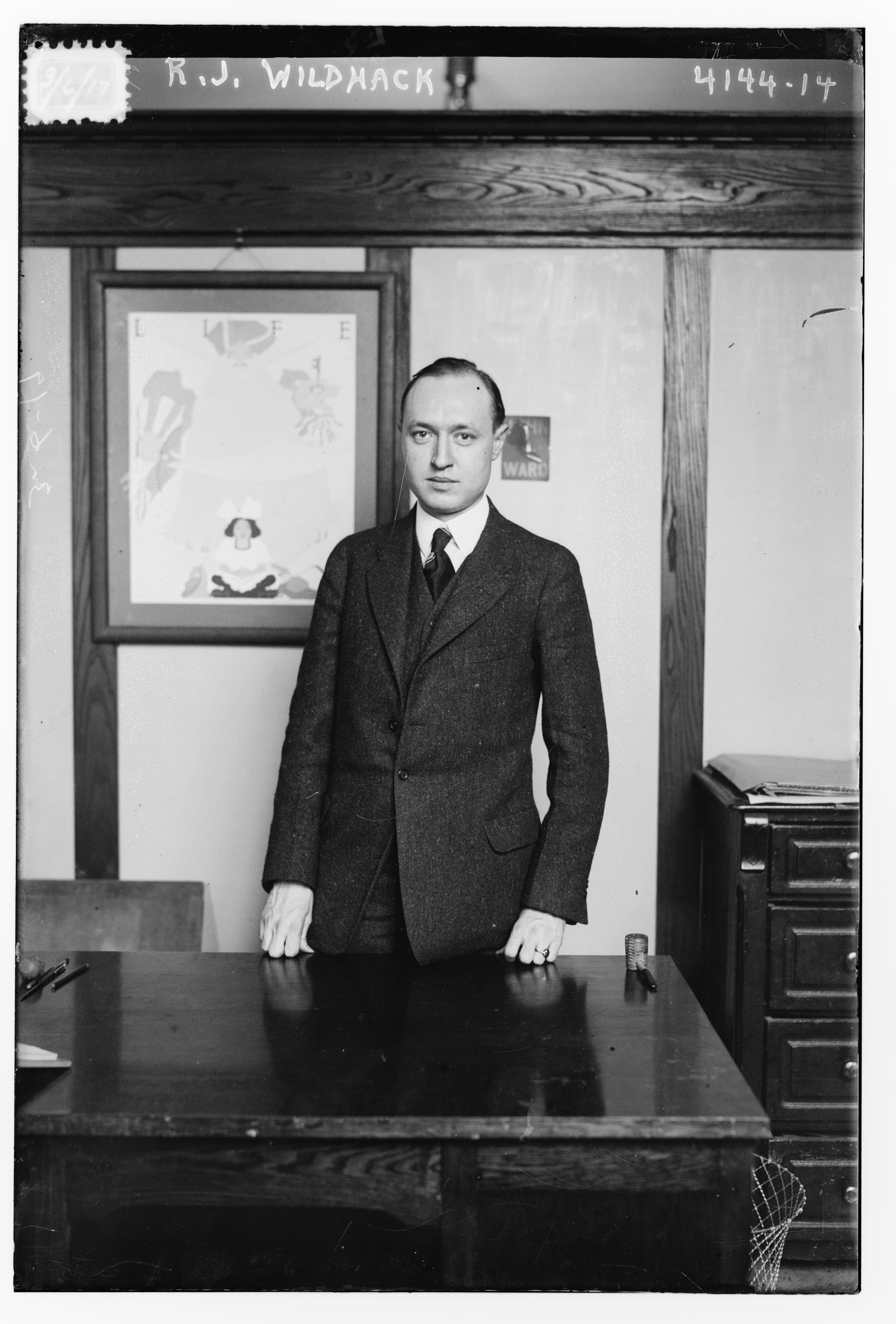
Wildhack in 1917

Robert John Wildhack (August 27, 1881 - June 20, 1940) was an American illustrator and comic, who was known on stage, screen and radio for various monologues purporting to analyze sneezes, snores, and hunting.

== Biography ==
He was born on August 27, 1881, in Pekin, Illinois. He died on June 20, 1940, in Los Angeles, California.

== Filmography ==
Year	Title	Role	Notes
1935	Broadway Melody of 1936	The Snorer	as Hornblow
1937	Broadway Melody of 1938	The Sneezer	
1939	Back Door to Heaven	Mr. Herzing	(final film role)
