= Igor Gorin =

American opera singer (1904–1982)

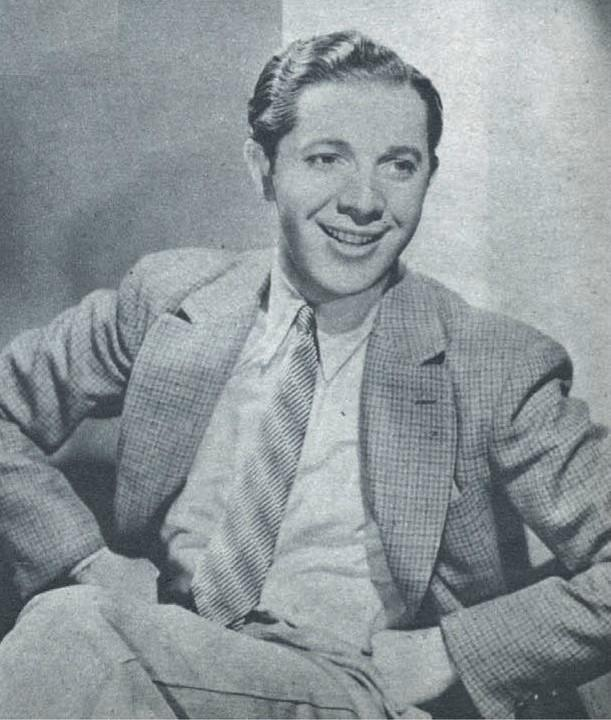
Igor Gorin (1937)

Igor Gorin (October 26, 1904 – March 24, 1982) was a Ukrainian Jewish baritone and music teacher. In screen credits, he is sometimes known as Charles Igor Gorin.

== Early life ==
Gorin was born Ignatz Greenberg on October 26, 1904, in the small village of Grodek (today Horodok, Lviv Oblast) in the Austro-Hungarian Empire. His father, Sholom Greenberg, was a rabbi and a Talmudist who taught religion in Grodek and in the neighboring provinces. Igor was not close to his father; it was his beloved mother, Yente Moritz Greenberg, who passed on her love of music to her son.

Igor's father enrolled him in the Talmudist school where Igor displayed an amazing aptitude for the orthodox Jewish liturgy, which he committed to memory. He mastered Hebrew and eventually spoke eight languages fluently. He also sang in the local synagogue choir.

In 1919, when Igor was 15, the Greenberg family moved to Vienna, Austria. Living conditions in Vienna were not much better than they had been in Grodek. Igor worked at many different jobs during these years: in an iron factory, a tailor shop, and delivering milk. The work hours were from 6 am until 8 pm, 6 days a week. In what little free time he had, he visited the public library and sat in on many lectures at the Urania, a tuition-free night school. On Sundays he would often go to a movie theater and he developed a fascination with America. Like many, he loved Westerns, and cowboys and horses would forever fascinate him.

== Musical career ==
Either as a result of auditioning for a synagogue choir or because a neighbor, who overheard him singing, had Igor audition for a local choir director, his singing drew the attention of Viktor Fuchs, one of the most distinguished voice teachers in Vienna. Though the young man's scruffy and emaciated appearance was repellent, Fuchs would say of the audition years later, "I knew this boy had something, for he was so tenacious in his desire to sing." As a result, in 1925, Fuchs offered Igor free lessons with Robert Traniewsky, one of his assistants. After recovering from a bout with tuberculosis, Gorin studied at the Vienna Music Academy from 1926 to 1929, studying piano, music theory and formal voice training.

Gorin's idol during this period was Italian baritone Mattia Battistini. He resolved that he wanted his voice to sound like Battistini's and made a concentrated effort to master the bel canto singing style.

Gorin became head cantor at the Leopoldstadt Synagogue in Vienna and his fame as a cantor became widespread. One of the rabbis who heard him arranged for Gorin to make his operatic debut as Ping in a Swiss performance of Turandot. He subsequently joined a Czech opera touring company and finally the Vienna Volksoper in 1930. His roles included Tonio, Germont, Figaro, Rigoletto, Renato, Wolfram, Escamillo and Valentin.

== Success in the United States ==
It was not as an opera singer that Gorin made his first visit to the United States of America, but rather as a cantor in Providence, Rhode Island, in 1930 and 1931. Upon returning to Austria, he became greatly disturbed at the reports of Nazi purges of the German-Jewish population and the growing popularity of Adolf Hitler, and in 1933 he emigrated to the U.S. permanently.

Gorin's career in the U.S. began at the Radio City Music Hall in New York City, where he was billed as a "Viennese baritone". After that he was engaged for a 10-week stint on NBC's The Standard Hour. It was during these programs that Gorin met the composer Albert Hay Malotte. As a result, Gorin was the first to perform Malotte's famous setting of "The Lord's Prayer". It was to become Gorin's most popular number on radio, on television and in concerts. His recording of it in 1940 became his most popular recorded selection.

Gorin then joined the radio program Hollywood Hotel and his success there led to appearances on the Kraft Music Hall, Great Moments in Music, The Ford Sunday Evening Hour, International Harvester, and The RCA Victor Hour. In 1936, he signed his first recording contract with RCA Victor and made his first recordings in 1937. He also did a screen test for Metro-Goldwyn-Mayer and appeared in a secondary role in "Broadway Melody of 1938" singing "The Toreador Song" from Carmen and parts of "Largo al factotum" from The Barber of Seville.

In May 1939, Gorin married Mary Smith, and became a naturalized U.S. citizen in July.

From this point forward, Igor Gorin's career was pretty well determined. Although he did audition for the Metropolitan Opera, the Met did not engage him. Gorin went on to become primarily a concert singer who appeared on programs such as The Voice of Firestone and The Bell Telephone Hour regularly. He also appeared in opera performances at a variety of companies around the country, from Pasadena, California to Baltimore, Maryland. Among his many performances was his annual participation as Brigham Young in the Mormon historical pageant "All Faces West" .

Notable performances included portrayals of Rigoletto on the television program NBC Opera Theatre in 1958 and Giorgio Germont with NBC again in 1960. He appeared with Boris Christoff in 1962 at the Lyric Opera of Chicago in Alexander Borodin's Prince Igor, directed by Vladimir Rosing. Rosing also directed Gorin in The Student Prince at the Hollywood Bowl that same year. In 1963 Gorin sang with the New York City Opera, as Rigoletto, and Giorgio Germont in La traviata (opposite Beverly Sills). He made one guest appearance at the Metropolitan Opera in La Traviata in 1964.

== Retirement and later life ==
For reasons of declining health, Igor Gorin retired from the concert stage and in 1966, he became a professor of music at the University of Arizona in Tucson. He died as a result of cancer at the age of 77 on March 24, 1982, in Tucson.
