= Back Door to Heaven =

1939 film by William K. Howard

- Directed by: William K. Howard
- Written by: John Bright; Robert Tasker
- Story by: William K. Howard (story "Picket Fence")
- Produced by: William K. Howard
- Starring: Wallace Ford; Aline MacMahon; Stuart Erwin; Patricia Ellis; Bert Frohman; Jimmy Lydon
- Cinematography: Hal Mohr
- Edited by: Jack Murray
- Music by: Maurice Baron
- Production companies: Vernon Steele Productions; Odessco Productions
- Distributed by: Paramount Pictures
- Release date: April 19, 1939 (New York City)
- Running time: 85 minutes
- Country: United States
- Language: English
- Budget: $350,000

Back Door to Heaven is a 1939 American crime drama film directed by William K. Howard and starring Wallace Ford, Aline MacMahon, Stuart Erwin and Patricia Ellis.

== Plot ==
The story revolves around a delinquent boy later to become a convict, the relationship he has throughout his life with his school colleagues and teacher, and how his calm demeanour no matter what life throws at him, leaves a lasting impression upon them.

Frankie is an impoverished child of a kindly mother and an alcoholic father who spends what little income the family receives on drink. He is about to graduate from school and his family cannot afford to clothe him on this occasion. His teacher, Miss Williams, asks him to participate with the class in a performance in front of the school inspector. While others in the class have academic prowess, he plays the harmonica for him. Unfortunately the instrument is not his, as he noticed it in a shop window the previous night. He stole the harmonica along with some money, and the sheriff arrived just after the performance to interrogate him about the crime. Although his teacher and the sheriff are sympathetic to Frankie's situation, the severity of the crime means that he has to be sent to reform school.

He gains a tough reputation there and afterwards is sent to the state penitentiary for five years for punching a prison monitor. After this time he is released as an adult with two other inmates, and they spend their first evening of freedom together. Later they go with Frankie back to his home town. It happens to be Miss Williams' birthday, and she is opening cards and presents sent by her former pupils, including Frankie. Although she has fond thoughts of all her students, she said to her friends that she cared for Frankie as if he were her own.

Things have changed since Frankie left the town. He returns to his family shack, to find that a black woman and her children are now living there. She tells Frankie that his father had died and that his mother was taken away to an asylum a year previously. He meets Miss Williams and discovers that she has been pensioned off. He visits the chairman of the school board of governors, who happens to be both an old school colleague and the local bank manager. He asks him to find a position for Miss Williams in the new school, and agrees to consider it. The visiting trio then leave the town for Cleveland.

Frankie meets up with another classmate Carol and forms a relationship with her. Upon returning to his digs, he finds a note from his two friends saying that they intended to rob an ice cream parlour at a given time. He races to the scene in order to prevent the crime, but arrives just as they kill the proprietor. He is implicated in and arrested for the crime. During the trial, Frankie is defended by another classmate, John Shelley (Van Heflin). While inexperienced as a lawyer, he delivers a powerful oration to the jury.

Despite this, the jury finds him guilty, and he awaits execution. At the same time, the bank manager has organized a class reunion in the old schoolhouse. Frankie escapes from jail and manages to attend the reunion for a few moments. His parting message to his teacher and classmates is to never hate anyone, as he had abandoned any hatred for people while he was in jail. After he leaves the building, the sound of gunfire affirms that the police have caught up with him.

== Cast ==
- Wallace Ford as Francis ("Frankie") Rogers, as an adult
- Aline MacMahon as Miss Williams
- Stuart Erwin as Jud Mason
- Patricia Ellis as Carol Evans, as an adult
- Bert Frohman as Bert "Mouse" Gatto
- Jimmy Lydon as Frankie Rogers, as a child
- Anita Magee as Carol Evans, as a child
- Raymond Roe as John Shelley, as a child
- William Redfield as Charley Smith, as a child
- Kenneth LeRoy as Bob Hale, as a child
- David Johnson as Wallace Kischler, as a child
- William Harrigan as Frankie's Father
- Jane Seymour as Frankie's Mother
- Alfred Webster as Sheriff Alvin Kramer
- Robert John Wildhack as Rudolph Herzing
- Kent Smith as John Shelley - as Adult (replaced by Van Heflin)
- Van Heflin as John Shelley, as an adult
- Douglas McMullen as Wallace Kischler, as an adult
- George J. Lewis as Bob Hale, as an adult
- Bruce A. Evans as Charley Smith, as an adult
- Georgette Harvey as Mrs. Hamilton
- Helen Christian as Mrs. Gladys Smith
- Iris Adrian as Sugar, Burlesque Dancer

== Soundtrack ==
- Bert Frohman - "Home Town"
- Al Siegel - "Things In My Heart"
