= Kiki Ebsen =

American singer (born 1958)

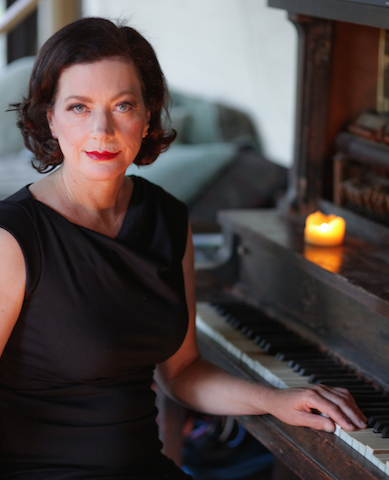
- Ebsen in 2014
- Born: Nancy Kiersten Ebsen; January 14, 1958 (age 68); Santa Monica, California, United States
- Occupations: Singer, songwriter, keyboardist
- Years active: 1970s–present
- Father: Buddy Ebsen
- Relatives: Vilma Ebsen (aunt)
- Website: http://www.kikiebsen.com

Kiki Ebsen (born January 14, 1958) is a singer-songwriter and keyboardist from Santa Monica, California. She has performed and toured nationally and internationally with many musicians, including Boz Scaggs, Al Jarreau, Christopher Cross, and Tracy Chapman. Beginning in 1987, she has released eight studio albums. Following a successful Kickstarter campaign, she release her sixth album, Scarecrow Sessions, a collection of jazz standards and a tribute to her father, Buddy Ebsen's, life and career. Today, Ebsen divides her time among writing, recording and performing music, and works with rescued horses, developing educational programs with her California nonprofit organization, The Healing Equine Ranch.

== Family and early life ==
Kiki Ebsen was born Nancy Kiersten Ebsen at Saint John's Health Center in Santa Monica, California. Her father is actor Buddy Ebsen and her mother is Nancy Wolcott, also an actor and executive producer/director of the Newport Harbor Actors Theater. Kiki has three sisters, two half sisters, and one brother. She spent the first three years of her life on Hutton Drive in Beverly Hills, California. Then the family moved to Balboa Isle, where she enjoyed the waterfront and learned to sail from her dad. She moved at age 11 to a secluded ranch in the Malibu mountains. There, her love of horses led to several successful years as a champion equestrian. Ultimately, the arts beckoned, and at 18, she left her horses to pursue a career in music.

== Career ==
Kiki started playing piano as a child, following in the footsteps of her mother, aunt, and grandmother. Picking up melodies effortlessly by ear, she began composing her own songs at an early age. She pursued her love of music balanced by her love of animals and nature while growing up in the coastal town of Balboa Island, California and on a ranch in the Santa Monica Mountains. While Kiki was in high school, Buddy Ebsen developed a family troupe, during a hiatus from filming the CBS television show, Barnaby Jones, that went on a tour of southern California. Kiki sang and played keyboard, brother Dustin played drums, and sister Bonnie sang and danced with Buddy, while older sister Susannah was the company manager, and another sister, Cathy, helped with transportation when her schedule showing horses permitted. The Ebsen troupe traveled to dates in Merced, Visalia, Placerville, Sacramento, San Jose, and El Camino College in Torrance. An equal amount of time was spent studying acting with her mother, performing and singing in several productions before graduating from high school.

Ebsen then focused on music primarily as her career interests narrowed, and honed her skills in countless California garage bands. Ebsen went on to earn a degree in classical voice from California Institute of the Arts. Just out of college, Kiki won Collegiate Entertainer of the Year and from there embarked on a touring career with the multiplatinum recording and touring band, Chicago, as a keyboardist and MIDI tech. Two tours and one record later, Ebsen left to join Al Jarreau's touring band. While featured early in her career on the recordings of several of the musicians with whom she toured, ultimately Kiki signed a contract with the Sin-Drome label, on which she would release her first solo CD.

Ebsen's inaugural CD, Red, was produced by hit smooth jazz producer Paul Brown and features inspired performances from Boney James, Buzz Feiten, and Paul Jackson Jr. It was dubbed "the kind of debut most artists can only dream of creating" by the Mac Report. Her sophomore effort, Love Loud, made it into Muse's "Muse Top 10" of 2002. She later reunited with Paul Brown to create Kiki, which was added to Steve Quirk's Fusion Flavors Best of 2005 list. Says Quirk, "Kiki is a sleeping giant in contemporary music, who deserves to be heard." She released her first cover CD in 2009, Cool Songs Vol. 1, featuring classic pop tunes such as "Time After Time," "It's Too Late," and "Diary." Kiki's music appears on several compilations worldwide. Today she divides her time between writing, recording, touring solo (and with select artists) and nonprofit work with T.H.E. Ranch, an equine rescue and educational organization that she founded.

== Television appearances ==
Her earliest television appearances with the Al Jarreau Band were on The Tonight Show Starring Johnny Carson and The Arsenio Hall Show before embarking on a world tour. The band featured future stars including N'Dea Davenport (Brand New Heavies), Rickey Minor (American Idol, The Tonight Show with Jay Leno), and Felicia Collins (Late Show with David Letterman). Additional TV credits include performances with Take Six, Blake Shelton, Glen Campbell, Michelle Branch, Robert Goulet, Dolly Parton, Lee Ann Womack, Gloria Estefan, Kenny Loggins, Melissa Etheridge, Patty Griffin, and many more.

== Songwriting ==
Ebsen began writing songs as a teenager, and continues to compose to this day. Several of Ebsen's CD releases to date feature strictly her own songs, including Red, Love Loud, and The Beauty Inside. Three of Ebsen's compositions have been covered by sax artists Eric Marienthal, Boney James, and Jessy J. Kiki's vocals appear on Eric Marienthal's album One Touch (GRP Records, 1993) in the song, "That's the Way", a song co-written by Dave Koz, Ebsen, and Randy Hall. Ebsen's composition, "Blue", which is included on Boney James' Backbone album (Warner Brothers, 1994), features James on tenor saxophone and Ebsen on keyboards. Saxophonist Jessy J. included Ebsen's composition, "Turquoise Street", on her 2008 album, Tequila Moon (Peak/Concord).

== Recordings ==
Ebsen's critically acclaimed solo releases include Red, Love Loud, Kiki, Cool Songs, Vol. 1, and The Beauty Inside, The Music of Joni Mitchell and Fill Me Up. She can be seen and heard on music videos featuring Tracy Chapman and Michael Bolton as well as live concerts video/DVDs from Christopher Cross, Belinda Carlisle, Namie Amuro, and Al Jarreau.

As a backing vocalist and keyboard player, a full listing of Ebsen's discography on compilation recordings as well as appearances on other artists' recordings is found on the artist's official web site.

== Solo discography ==
Albums

Album	Year
Red (debut album)	1994
Love Loud	2000
Kiki	2002
Cool Songs, vol 1	2005
The Beauty Inside	2011
Scarecrow Sessions	2014
Cool Songs vol 2: The Music of Joni Mitchell	2017
Fill Me Up	2021

== Scarecrow Sessions ==
With the advent of Scarecrow Sessions, Kiki Ebsen has established herself as a solo performer and viable jazz singer, solo, with a trio, or in front of an orchestra. The album, which includes historical photos and stories behind the songs, was completed in time for Father's Day 2014; Kickstarter contributors received their copies in advance of the official release. Scarecrow Sessions features well-known jazz musicians including John Patitucci on bass and Chuck Loeb on guitar, Henry Hey on piano, and Clint De Ganon on drums. David Mann produced the album, wrote the arrangements, and played saxophone.

Her CD has received substantive critical acclaim. The impetus behind the album is taking the advice her father Buddy had given her many years before his death. One track, "Missing You", has special meaning for Kiki. As noted by music reviewer Jean-Keith Fagon, Kiki "unearthed the yearning torch song “Missing You” when sifting through a box of her father's old scripts and songbooks after his death. She began performing the arresting piano and voice confessional coauthored by her father during her own concerts." Reviewer George W. Harris of Jazz Weekly noted of Scarecrow Sessions, "Her voice is somewhere between Astrud Gilberto sotto voce and Broadway, able to coo softly on a creatively intimate samba with Loeb on “Comes Love” or hit the climaxes just right on a luminous “Over the Rainbow.” Music reviewer Preston Frazier included Scarecrow Sessions as no. 5 on his top-10 "Best of Jazz and Fusion Jazz" listing. Said Frazier, "The Scarecrow Sessions give Kiki Ebsen a chance to showcase her excellent arranging chops. Who would have guessed that the song “If I Only Had A Brain” could sound so substantial? Part of the album's success also lies in Ebsen's classically trained and soulful voice."

== Touring ==
Ebsen has performed across the United States. She has toured with many artists such as Christopher Cross, Tracy Chapman, Bill Champlin, Peter Cetera, Michael McDonald, James Ingram, Dave Koz, Boz Scaggs, Wilson Phillips, Stephen Bishop, Belinda Carlisle, Patti Austin, Bobby Caldwell, Colin Hay, Susannah Hoffs, Barry Mann, Cynthia Weil, Jeffrey Osborne, Michael Paulo, Al Stewart, and Deniece Williams.

== Live solo performances ==
Ebsen has opened for Christopher Cross, Peter Cetera, Emmylou Harris, and Al Stewart. Notable solo performances include the NAMM Show, FAR-West Official Showcase, Folk Alliance International Featured Showcase Artist, The Maui Music Festival, Java Jazz Festival, Waikaloa Music and Wine Festival, Tin Pan South, Pacific Rim Jazz Festival, KSBR 25th Birthday Bash, The KIFM Anniversary Party and the Temecula Music and Wine Festival. Ebsen made her touring debut in Scotland during August, 2014.

== Nonprofit and charitable involvement ==
Ebsen has had a history of participating in charities.

In 2002, Ebsen renewed her love of horses by rescuing a foal from a feed lot where it was to be slaughtered for meat. She went to rescue 10 more horses from economic distress. During that time, she formed The Healing Equine Ranch. a 501c3. Using a herd of rescued horses, she teaches the language of horses and how to connect and build relationships from the ground up. Her mission statement is "to empower, enlighten and educate humans through natural interaction with horses." For the past five years, Ebsen has hosted many fund-raising concerts to support her passion. Often, a portion of the proceeds of several of her solo albums has been directed to support the work of T.H.E. Ranch, and others among her talented musician friends have similarly participated in donating their time and talents to ranch concerts to help raise funds for these rescue and educational projects.

On December 14, 2014, Ebsen was among the many musicians who volunteered to join at the Canyon Club and contribute their time, talents, and auction items to the "Mighty Met Acoustic Flashback Benefit in behalf beloved 1970s KMET DJ, Pat Kelley, in his battle with multiple sclerosis.

== Trivia ==
Kiki was an extra in the film Back To The Future, playing a musician in the band audition scene with Huey Lewis. Kiki's voice is featured in the 1993 soundtrack for the film, Bodies, Rest and Motion, starring Bridget Fonda and Eric Stoltz.
