= They Met in Argentina =

1941 film by Leslie Goodwins

- Directed by: Leslie Goodwins; Jack Hively
- Written by: Jerome Cady
- Story by: Lou Brock
- Produced by: Lou Brock
- Starring: Maureen O'Hara; James Ellison
- Cinematography: J. Roy Hunt
- Edited by: Desmond Marquette
- Music by: Rodgers and Hart
- Production company: RKO Radio Pictures
- Distributed by: RKO Radio Pictures
- Release date: April 25, 1941
- Running time: 77 minutes
- Country: United States
- Language: English
- Budget: $500,000

They Met in Argentina is a 1941 American musical comedy film directed by Leslie Goodwins and Jack Hively for RKO Pictures. Hively had to come in and finish the picture after Goodwins was hospitalized for pneumonia. Maureen O'Hara plays an Argentinian who falls in love with a Texan (James Ellison), who is attempting to buy a racehorse from her father. It was one of a number of Hollywood films from the 1940s produced to reflect America's "Good Neighbor policy" towards Latin American countries. They Met in Argentina was not well received by audiences, critics, or the Argentine government.

== Plot ==
Tim Kelly (James Ellison) is a Texan in the oil business who travels to Argentina to bid for some land. When his bid is unsuccessful, he teams up with colleague Duke Ferrell (Buddy Ebsen) to buy their employer a successful racehorse, Lucero, in the hope that this will compensate for the failed bid. Tim falls in love with Lolita O'Shea (Maureen O'Hara), the daughter of the racehorse's owner, Don Enrique (Robert Barrat). Don Enrique is against selling Lucero, but when he realises his daughter is in love with Tim, he offers him the racehorse on the condition that he immediately returns to the USA. When Lolita realises Tim has left, she pursues him on horseback.

== Cast ==
- Maureen O'Hara as Lolita O'Shea
- James Ellison as Tim Kelly
- Alberto Vila as Alberto Delmonte
- Buddy Ebsen as Duke Ferrel
- Robert Barrat as Don Enrique de los Santos O'Shea
- Joseph Buloff as Santiago, O'Shea's Trainer
- Diosa Costello as Panchita
- Robert Middlemass as George Hastings
- Luis Alberni as Don Luis Jose Alfonso Frutos y Murphy
- Fortunio Bonanova as Pedro, Ranch Blacksmith
- Antonio Moreno as Don Carlos
- Chester Clute as B.A. Jackson, Hastings' Secretary
- Charles Quigley as Reporter

== Background and production ==
In the early 1940s, Hollywood studios produced a number of films which reflected America's "Good Neighbor policy" towards Latin America; They Met in Argentina was one of RKO Pictures' contributions. With these films set in Latin American countries, the studios hoped to both attract an audience in Latin America and to increase popular interest in the region among a North American audience. Other films of this nature included the Twentieth-Century Fox productions Down Argentine Way (1940) and Blood and Sand (1941).

They Met in Argentina was based on a story by Lou Brock, who was also the film's producer. Brock approached Rodgers and Hart to score the production. The pair wrote 12 songs in total, although only 7 of them were included in the final cut. The songs featured in the soundtrack are "You've Got the Best of Me", "North America Meets South America", "Amarillo", "Lolita", "Cutting the Cane", "Never Go To Argentina" and "Simpatica". The dance sequences were choreographed by Frank Veloz.

When Goodwins was hospitalized for pneumonia during production, RKO brought in veteran director Jack Hively to replace him and finish the film.

== Reception ==
=== Box office ===
The film fared poorly in cinemas, and made a loss of $270,000.

=== Critical ===
The film received negative reviews from critics, with Robert Dana in the New York Herald Tribune describing it as "an American musical at its worst". Film critic Leonard Maltin later described it as a "dismal musical". The Argentine government spoke out against the distribution of the film in Latin America.
