= Vilma Ebsen =

American actress (1911–2007)

- Ebsen in 1940
- Born: Vilma Marie Ebsen; February 1, 1911; Belleville, Illinois, U.S.
- Died: March 12, 2007 (aged 96); Thousand Oaks, California, U.S.
- Occupation: Actress
- Years active: 1935–1941
- Spouse(s): Robert Emmett Dolan (1933–1948; divorced); 1 child Stanley Briggs (1948–19??; divorced); 1 child
- Children: 2
- Relatives: Buddy Ebsen (brother), Kiki Ebsen (niece)

Vilma Marie Ebsen (February 1, 1911 – March 12, 2007) was an American musical theatre and film actress best known for dancing in Broadway shows and Metro-Goldwyn-Mayer musicals in the 1930s with her brother Buddy Ebsen.

== Biography ==
Ebsen was born in Belleville, Illinois. During her childhood, her family relocated to Orlando, Florida. Beginning at age 2, she learned to dance at her father's dance studio, along with her siblings. Her father also coached her in swimming, and she won a state breaststroke championship in Florida in 1927.

Arthur Murray hired Vilma and Buddy Ebsen when they were teenagers to dance for one summer at teatime in the Grove Park Inn in Asheville, North Carolina, where Murray was the social director. They moved to New York City in 1928, where they formed a vaudeville act. Rather than duplicating each other's movements, their dances were (as Vilma put it) in counterpoint with each doing different movements. One of their early appearances together was in Eddie Cantor's Ziegfeld production Whoopee!. When Whoopee closed after a year and a half, Vilma and Buddy Ebsen took their act to Atlantic City, New Jersey, where they caught the eye of celebrity columnist Walter Winchell. Repeated positive mentions of the Ebsens in Winchell's column brought them multiple offers for performing.

Along with her brother, Ebsen performed a dance act on Broadway, as well as around the United States in vaudeville theaters and supper clubs throughout the early 1930s. The two starred in Broadway productions of Flying Colors (1932) and Ziegfeld Follies of 1934. They moved to Hollywood in 1935, where Vilma appeared as Sally Burke in Broadway Melody of 1936 (1935).

After the success of Broadway Melody of 1936, the studio decided to separate the Ebsens. Vilma Ebsen was not interested in accepting Louis B. Mayer's offer to make her "the next Myrna Loy" and moved back to New York with her husband, composer and bandleader Robert Emmett "Bobby" Dolan, whom she had married on June 24, 1933. Back in New York, she appeared in the Broadway musical comedy, Between the Devil, with British dancing stars Jack Buchanan, Evelyn Laye, and Adele Dixon. This show ran from December 22, 1937, until March 12, 1938.

Ebsen then retired from show business to become a full-time homemaker. She and Dolan moved to Pacific Palisades, California in 1941. They had one child, a son named Robert, and later divorced in January 1948. Later that year, she married tennis player Stanley Briggs. They had a son, Michael.

In the 1950s, she opened a dance school in Pacific Palisades with her sister, Helga, which was partially funded by their brother, Buddy. They also had a dance studio in Beverly Hills where they taught tap, ballet, and acrobatics. Candace Bergen was a student there. Her son Robert Dolan was one of the dance teachers. Another was Arthur Mahoney, a ballet master from New York. The school offered lessons in tap, jazz, ballet, and ballroom dance. It also gave annual dance recitals and cotillions at the Riveria Country Club, Deauville Beach Club, and other notable venues.

The Ebsen Dance Studio was in a large two-story building on Swarthmore Drive, and Vilma and Helga lived in a house behind the studio. The studio had a large room below and several smaller dance rooms above. The studio staged a community theatre production of The Teahouse of the August Moon in 1960, but thereafter discontinued its community theatre and dismantled the stage to enlarge the space into a larger dance area.

Vilma Ebsen died at the age of 96 in Thousand Oaks, California.

== Filmography ==
Year	Title	Role	Notes
1935	Broadway Melody of 1936	Sally Burke	
