= Buddy Ebsen =

American actor and dancer (1908–2003)

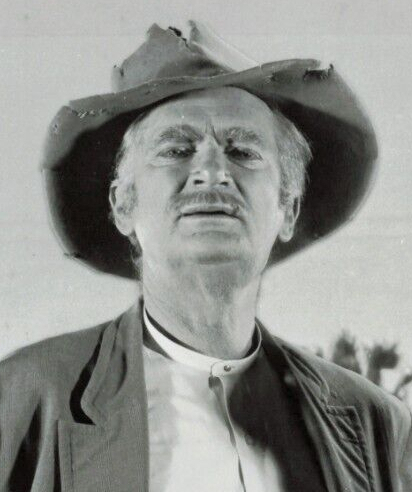
- Ebsen in 1969
- Born: Christian Ludolf Ebsen Jr. April 2, 1908; Belleville, Illinois, U.S.
- Died: July 6, 2003 (aged 95); Torrance, California, U.S.
- Resting place: Pacific Crest Cemetery, Redondo Beach, California, U.S.
- Education: Rollins College, University of Florida
- Occupations: Actor; singer; dancer; comedian
- Years active: 1928–1999
- Political party: Republican
- Spouses: Ruth Cambridge (m. 1936; div. 1942) Nancy Wolcott (m. 1945; div. 1985) Dorothy Knott (m. 1985)
- Children: 7, including Kiki
- Relatives: Vilma Ebsen (sister)

Buddy Ebsen (born Christian Ludolf Ebsen Jr.; April 2, 1908 – July 6, 2003) was an American actor and dancer, widely known for his role as Jed Clampett in the CBS television sitcom The Beverly Hillbillies (1962–1971) as well as his title role in the television detective drama Barnaby Jones (1973–1980). He is also known as Frank "Buddy" Ebsen.

Originally a dancer, Ebsen began his film career in Broadway Melody of 1936. He also appeared as a dancer with child star Shirley Temple in Captain January (1936). He was cast to appear in The Wizard of Oz (1939), originally as the Scarecrow, but before filming began, his role was changed to the Tin Man. He fell ill during filming due to the aluminum dust in his makeup and was forced to drop out. He appeared with Maureen O'Hara in They Met in Argentina (1941) and June Havoc in Sing Your Worries Away (1942). In Breakfast at Tiffany's (1961), he portrayed Doc Golightly, the much older husband of Audrey Hepburn's character. Before his starring role in The Beverly Hillbillies, Ebsen had a successful television career, the highlight of which was his role as Davy Crockett's sidekick, George Russell, in Walt Disney's Davy Crockett miniseries (1953–1954).

== Early years ==
A middle child with four sisters, Buddy Ebsen was born as Christian Ludolf Ebsen Jr., on April 2, 1908, in Belleville, Illinois. His father, Christian Ludolf Ebsen Sr., was born in Niebüll, Schleswig-Holstein, in 1872 and moved to the United States in 1888. Ebsen Sr. worked as a choreographer and was a physical fitness advocate: he owned a dance studio and subsequently operated a swimming pool for the local school district. His mother, Frances (née Wendt), was a Baltic German (specifically, Latvian) painter.

Ebsen was raised in Belleville until the age of ten when his family moved to Palm Beach County, Florida. In 1920, Ebsen and his family relocated to Orlando, Florida. Ebsen and his sisters learned to dance at a dance studio his father operated in Orlando.

During his high school years, Ebsen became a member of John M. Cheney Chapter, Order of DeMolay. His involvement as a teenager led to his being recognized by DeMolay in adult life with the award of the Legion of Honor Degree; further, in 1996 Ebsen was inducted into the DeMolay Hall of Fame.

Ebsen graduated from Orlando High School in 1926. Initially interested in a medical career, Ebsen attended the University of Florida in Gainesville, Florida, from 1926 to 1927, and then Rollins College in Winter Park, Florida, from 1927 to 1928. Family financial problems caused by the collapse of the Florida land boom forced Ebsen to leave college at age 20.

== Career ==
Ebsen left Orlando in the summer of 1928 to try his luck as a dancer in New York City, arriving with only $26.75 in his pocket, and worked at a soda fountain shop. He and his sister Vilma Ebsen performed as a dance act in supper clubs and in vaudeville — they were known as "The Baby Astaires". On Broadway, the Ebsens appeared in the musicals Whoopee, Flying Colors, and Ziegfeld Follies of 1934. A rave review from New York columnist Walter Winchell, who saw them perform in Atlantic City, New Jersey, led to a booking at the Palace Theatre in New York City, the pinnacle of the vaudeville world.

=== MGM signing ===
Ebsen went on to appear in numerous films, both musicals and nonmusicals, including the 1936 Born to Dance, the 1936 Captain January (in which he danced with Shirley Temple), the 1937 Broadway Melody of 1938 (with Judy Garland as his dance partner), and the 1938 The Girl of the Golden West. Ebsen partnered with actresses Eleanor Powell and Frances Langford, among others, and also danced solo.

Ebsen was noted for his unusual, surreal dancing and singing style (for example, his contribution to the "Swingin' the Jinx Away" finale of Born to Dance). His abilities might have been a reason filmmaker Walt Disney chose Ebsen to be filmed dancing in front of a grid as an aid to animating Mickey Mouse's dancing in Disney's 1929 to 1939 Silly Symphonies animated short films.

=== The Wizard of Oz ===
Ebsen as the Tin Man before being replaced by Jack Haley

Ebsen turned down Louis B. Mayer's offer of an exclusive MGM contract, and Mayer warned him that he would never work in Hollywood again. Nonetheless, MGM cast him as the Scarecrow in its 1939 film The Wizard of Oz. Ebsen then swapped roles with actor Ray Bolger, who was originally cast as the Tin Man. Bolger wanted to play the Scarecrow, and Ebsen did not object to the change. Ebsen had recorded all of his songs as the Tin Man, attended all the rehearsals, and had begun filming. However, he soon began experiencing body aches, muscle cramps, and shortness of breath, eventually leading to a lengthy hospitalization. Doctors determined that the aluminum dust used in the Tin Man makeup was coating his lungs and keeping his blood from being oxygenated, and he was forced to leave the production. Ebsen recalled in an interview included on the 2005 DVD release of The Wizard of Oz that the MGM studio heads did not believe that he was ill until he was ordered back to the set and was intercepted by an angry nurse.

Ebsen was replaced by Jack Haley, with the makeup quickly changed to a safer aluminum paste. MGM did not publicize the true reason for Ebsen's departure; even Haley was not told until much later. Haley re-recorded most of Ebsen's vocals, although Ebsen's Midwestern accent can still be heard on the soundtrack during several reprises of "We're Off to See the Wizard", with the enunciated "r" in the word "wizard", as opposed to Haley's Boston accent. Ebsen's recording of the Tin Man's solo "If I Only Had a Heart" is included on the deluxe edition of the film's soundtrack, while a still photo recreation of the sequence featuring shots of Ebsen as the Tin Man was included as an extra with all VHS and DVD releases of the film since 1989. For the rest of his life, Ebsen complained of breathing problems from his involvement in "that damned movie". Nonetheless, he outlived all the major cast members in the film, with only some Munchkin actors, extras such as Shep Houghton and stand-ins such as Caren Marsh Doll outliving him.

=== World War II ===
After recovering from the illness, Ebsen became embroiled in a contract dispute with MGM that left him idle for long periods. He took up sailing and became so proficient in seamanship that he taught the subject to naval officer candidates. He applied several times for a commission in the Navy in 1941, but was repeatedly turned down. The United States Coast Guard accepted his application for a commission, and he was promptly given the rank of lieutenant, junior grade. This wartime rank was one step up from the rank of ensign, the usual rank given newly appointed naval officers in peacetime. Ebsen served as damage control officer and later as executive officer on the Coast Guard-crewed Navy frigate USS Pocatello, which recorded weather at its "weather station" 1,500 miles west of Seattle. These patrols consisted of 30 days at sea, followed by 10 days in port at Seattle. Ebsen was honorably discharged from the Coast Guard as a lieutenant in 1946.

=== Return to acting ===
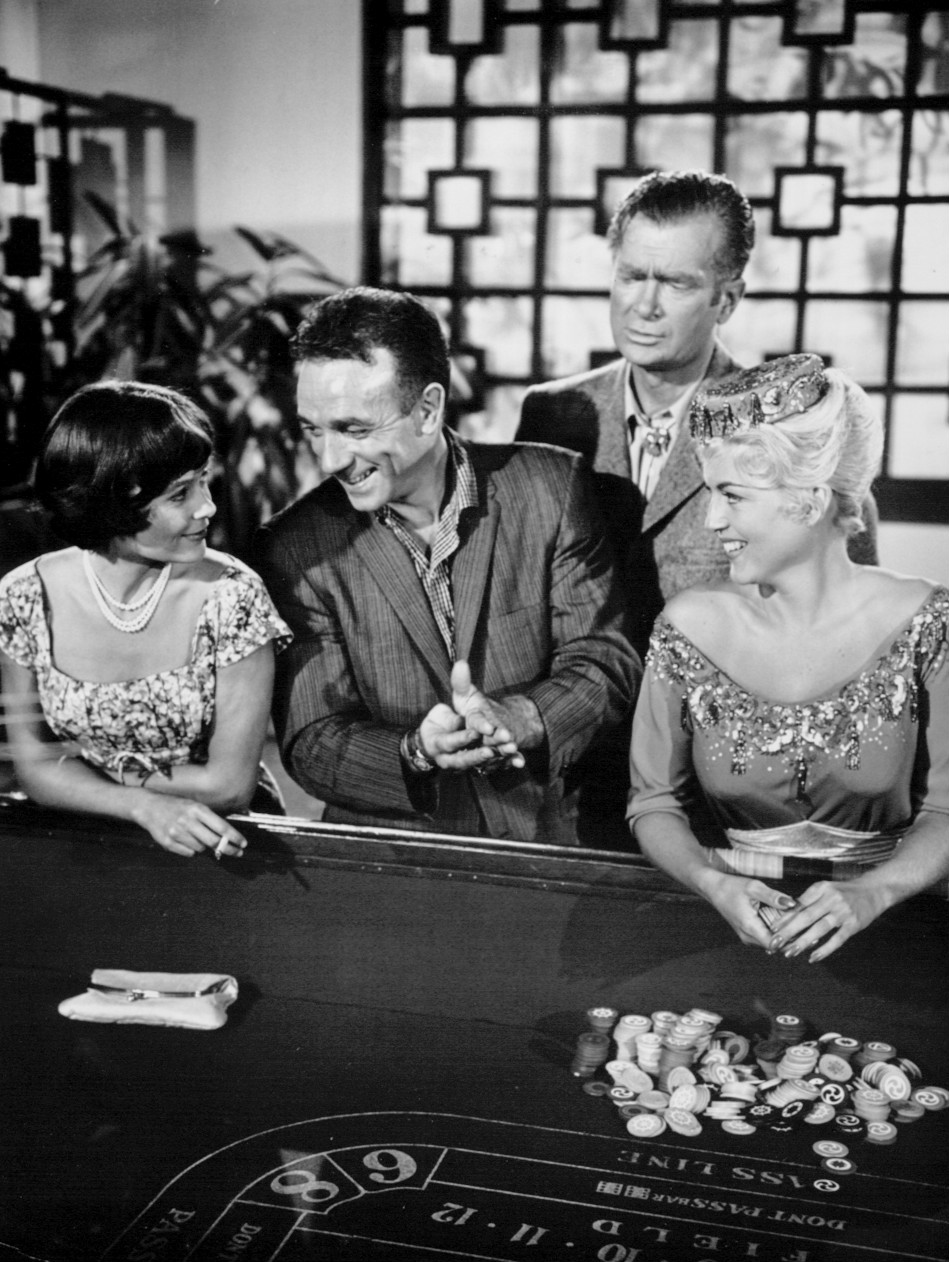
L-R: Christine Moore, Dane Clark, Buddy Ebsen and Jane Burgess in "The Prime Mover", a 1961 episode of The Twilight Zone

Ebsen made his television debut on an episode of The Chevrolet Tele-Theatre in 1949. This led to television appearances in: Stars Over Hollywood, Gruen Guild Playhouse, four episodes of Broadway Television Theatre, Schlitz Playhouse of Stars, Corky and White Shadow, the H.J. Heinz Company's Studio 57, Screen Directors Playhouse, two episodes of Climax!, Tales of Wells Fargo, Playhouse 90, Westinghouse Desilu Playhouse, Johnny Ringo, two episodes of Bonanza, three episodes of Maverick (in which he portrayed assorted homicidal villains), and 77 Sunset Strip. Ebsen received wide television exposure when he played Georgie Russel, a role based on a historical person and companion to frontiersman Davy Crockett, in the Disneyland television miniseries Davy Crockett (1954–1955).

In the 1958–1959 season, Ebsen co-starred in the 26-episode half-hour NBC television adventure series Northwest Passage. This series, the first half-hour Western filmed and broadcast in color on NBC, was a fictionalized account of Major Robert Rogers, a colonial American fighter for the British in the French and Indian War. Ebsen played the role of Sergeant Hunk Marriner; Keith Larsen played Rogers. From 1960 to 1962, Ebsen appeared in episodes of the television series Rawhide and Tales of Wells Fargo. Ebsen also portrayed a corrupt, bloodthirsty marshal in "El Paso Stage", an episode of Have Gun - Will Travel broadcast in April 1961.

Between October 1961 and March 1962, Ebsen had a recurring role as Virge Blessing in the ABC drama series Bus Stop, the story of travelers passing through the bus station and diner in the fictitious town of Sunrise, Colorado. Robert Altman directed several episodes. Arthur O'Connell had played Virge Blessing in the earlier film version on which the series was loosely based. Ebsen also appeared as "Mr. Dave" Browne, a homeless hobo, on The Andy Griffith Show opposite Ron Howard, and as Jimbo Cobb in The Twilight Zone episode "The Prime Mover" (season 2, episode 21) in 1961. Throughout the show's run, he played several characters on Gunsmoke including as the episode title character in Season 17, Episode 11 (Drago). A notable exception to Ebsen's continual work in Westerns and rural television shows was an acclaimed role as Doc Golightly, an older, rural veterinarian deserted by his young wife (played by Audrey Hepburn) in 1961's Breakfast at Tiffany's.

=== The Beverly Hillbillies (1962–1971) ===
Paul Henning recalls his reason for choosing Ebsen to play Jed Clampett: "I had seen him on TV and I couldn't imagine anyone else doing the role," he says. "I was fortunate to have him, because he became the cornerstone of the show."

—

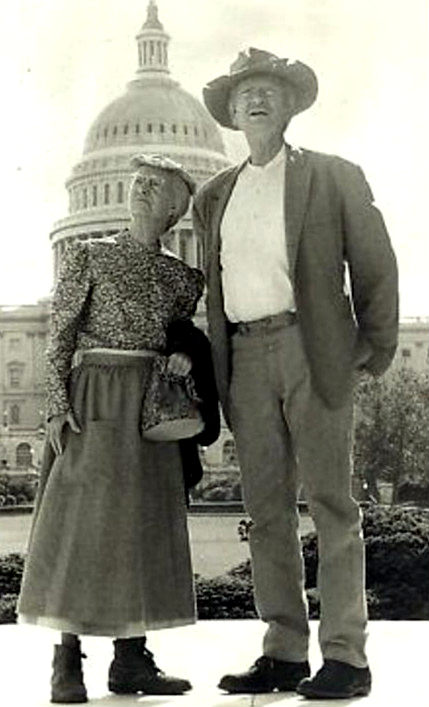
Irene Ryan and Buddy Ebsen in the Beverly Hillbillies episode "The Clampetts in Washington", 1970.

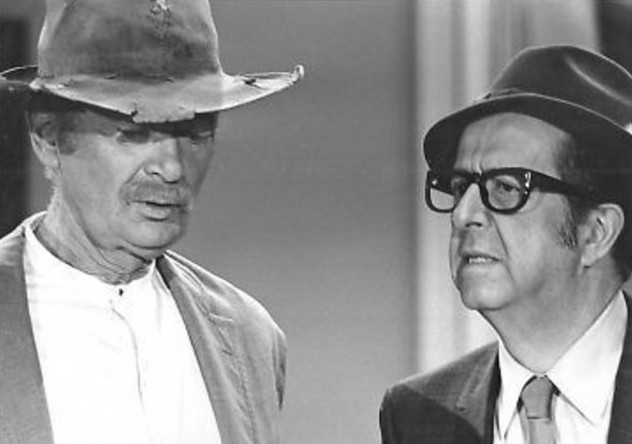
Ebsen with Phil Silvers (as con man Shifty Shafer) in The Beverly Hillbillies (circa 1969–1970)

Ebsen became famous as Jed Clampett, an easygoing backwoods mountaineer who strikes oil and moves with his family to Beverly Hills, California, in the long-running, fish-out-of-water CBS sitcom The Beverly Hillbillies.

Although scorned by critics, The Beverly Hillbillies attracted as many as 60 million viewers between 1962 and 1971 and was several times the highest-rated series on television. The show also spawned similar Paul Henning-produced rural sitcoms such as Green Acres and Petticoat Junction, which were eventually linked in crossover episode arcs. The Beverly Hillbillies was still earning good ratings when it was canceled by CBS (because programmers began shunning shows that attracted a rural audience). One episode, "The Giant Jack Rabbit", broadcast January 8, 1964 (season 2, episode 16) was the highest-rated half-hour on television to that time and remains the most-watched half-hour sitcom episode.

Not all was harmonious among cast members on The Beverly Hillbillies set, especially between the politically conservative Ebsen and the more liberal Nancy Kulp. Donna Douglas (Elly May) said, "They had a different view, so they had some heated discussions about that. They would go at it for weeks." In 1984, Kulp unsuccessfully ran for the U.S. House of Representatives as a Democrat from Pennsylvania. To her dismay, Ebsen supported her Republican opponent, incumbent Representative Bud Shuster, going so far as to tape an ad for Shuster that labeled Kulp as "too liberal". Ebsen claimed she was exploiting her celebrity status and did not know the issues.

=== Barnaby Jones (1973–1980) ===
Ebsen returned to television in 1973 as the title character of Barnaby Jones, which proved to be his second long-running television series. Barnaby Jones was a milk-drinking detective who came out of retirement to investigate the death of his son. The program lasted eight seasons and 178 episodes. Lee Meriwether, 1955 Miss America, played Barnaby's widowed daughter-in-law, Betty Jones. Ebsen appeared briefly as Barnaby Jones on two other productions: a 1975 episode of Cannon and the 1993 film The Beverly Hillbillies.

Meriwether said of her on and off screen chemistry with Ebsen, "He really worked at being at the top of his game." "You had to keep up with him. I adored him. I think he had feelings for me, too." She also said of the man, "I loved that man! I was so lucky. He was a dream." "He loved the idea of being a detective. We had CSI-type equipment in the office on the set and he liked doing his own tests. It was a show the whole family could watch."

=== Other television credits ===
Ebsen's last regular television series was Matt Houston on ABC, starring Lee Horsley. Ebsen played Matt's uncle, Roy Houston, during the show's third season from 1984 to 1985. He also appeared in "The Waiting Room", a Night Gallery segment that originally aired January 26, 1972.

Ebsen narrated the documentary series Disney Family Album during the 1980s on the Disney Channel and Steven Kellogg's "Paul Bunyan" on the PBS series Reading Rainbow in 1985. He made his final guest-starring appearance in 1994 on an episode of the short-lived television series revival Burke's Law.

=== Later years ===
Although generally retired from acting as he entered his 80s, Ebsen filmed a cameo in the 1993 film version of The Beverly Hillbillies as Barnaby Jones. This was Ebsen's final motion picture role. In 1999, Ebsen provided the voice of Chet Elderson for an episode of the Fox Entertainment program King of the Hill. This was his last TV appearance.

Ebsen has a star on the Hollywood Walk of Fame at 1765 Vine Street, and a star on the St. Louis Walk of Fame.

In 1993, Ebsen was inducted as a Disney Legends award winner.

== Personal life ==
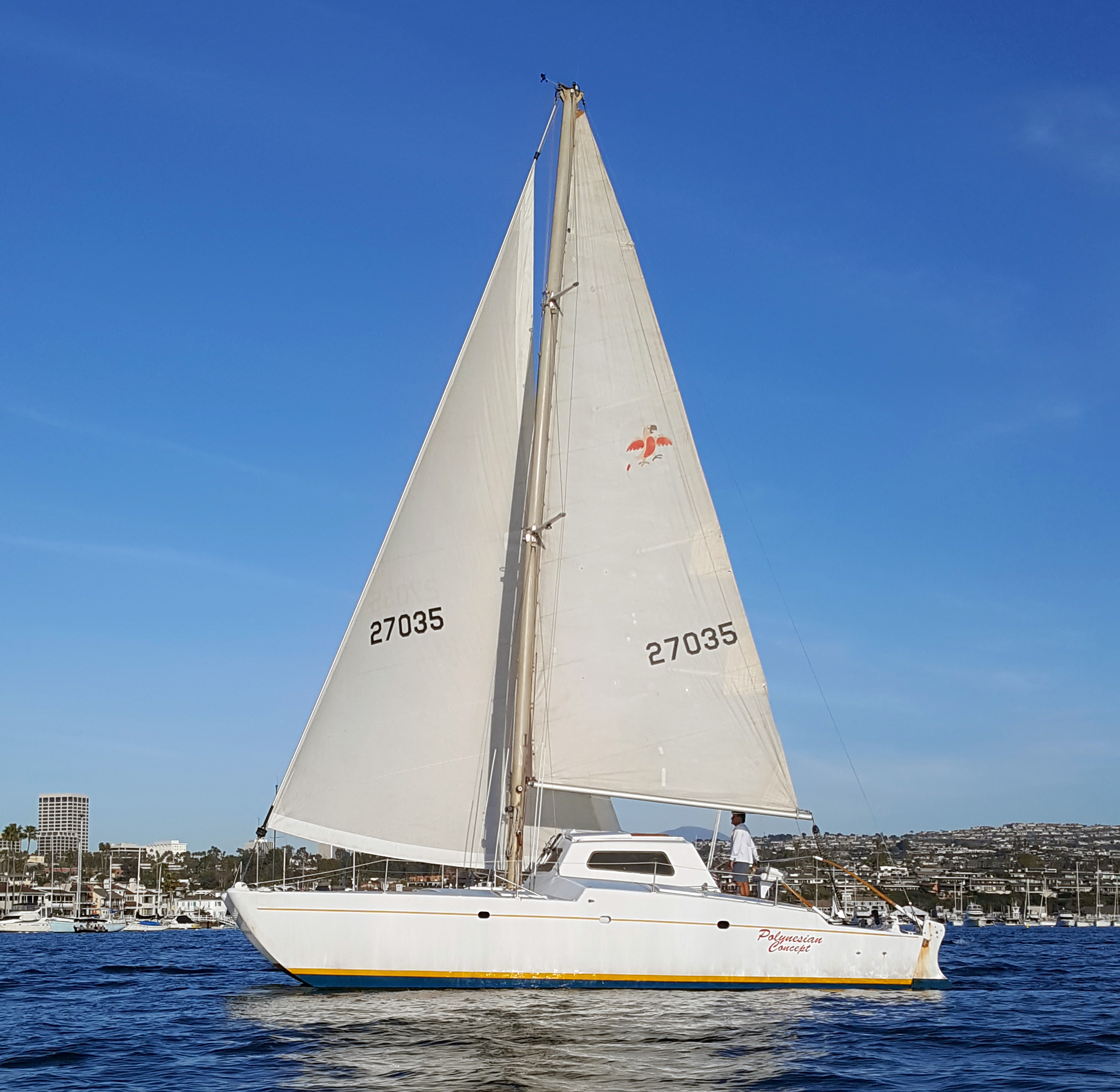
Polynesian Concept, a catamaran designed and built by Buddy Ebsen

In 1936, Ebsen married Ruth Cambridge. They had two daughters. The marriage ended in divorce.

In 1945, Ebsen married fellow lieutenant Nancy Wolcott. They had four daughters, including Kiki Ebsen, and a son. This marriage, after 39 years, also ended in divorce in 1985. Ebsen's daughters Kiki, Kathy, and Bonnie are all accomplished horsewomen.

In 1985, Ebsen married his third wife, Dorothy "Dotti" Knott, 40 years his junior. They had no children.

Throughout his life, Ebsen had many interests. He became a folk artist and an avid coin collector, co-founding the Beverly Hills Coin Club in 1987 with actor Chris Aable. Ebsen's collection included many rarities such as a four-dollar gold piece worth $200,000. The coin collection was sold in several auctions both before and after his death. As Ebsen entered his nineties, he continued to keep active, and two years before his death, his bestselling novel Kelly's Quest was published. Ebsen wrote several other books including Polynesian Concept (about sailing), The Other Side of Oz (an autobiography) and Sizzling Cold Case (a mystery based on his Barnaby Jones character).

Ebsen supported Barry Goldwater in the 1964 United States presidential election.

== Death ==
Ebsen died of respiratory failure at Torrance Memorial Medical Center in Torrance, California, on July 6, 2003, at the age of 95. He is buried at Pacific Crest Cemetery in Redondo Beach, California.

== Discography ==
=== Albums ===
- Buddy Ebsen Says Howdy (1965)
- The Beverly Hillbillies (1966) – with Irene Ryan
- Buddy's Originals (2001)

== Filmography ==
=== Film ===
Excluding appearances as himself.

- Broadway Melody of 1936 (1935) as Ted Burke
- Captain January (1936) as Paul Roberts
- Born to Dance (1936) as 'Mush' Tracy
- Banjo on My Knee (1936) as Buddy
- Broadway Melody of 1938 (1937) as Peter Trot
- The Girl of the Golden West (1938) as 'Alabama'
- Yellow Jack (1938) as 'Jellybeans'
- My Lucky Star (1938) as Buddy
- Four Girls in White (1939) as Express
- The Kid from Texas (1939) as 'Snifty'
- The Wizard of Oz (1939, replaced before filming for health reasons) as The Tin Man (singing voice, uncredited)
- They Met in Argentina (1941) as Duke Ferrel
- Parachute Battalion (1941) as Jeff Hollis
- Sing Your Worries Away (1942) as Tommy Jones
- Under Mexicali Stars (1950) as Homer Oglethorpe
- Silver City Bonanza (1951) as Gabe Horne
- Thunder in God's Country (1951) as Deputy Happy Hooper
- Rodeo King and the Senorita (1951) as Muscles Benton
- Utah Wagon Train (1951) as Snooper
- The Andrews Sisters (1951, TV Movie) as Tex
- Red Garters (1954) as Ginger Pete
- Night People (1954) as MSgt. Eddie McColloch
- Davy Crockett, King of the Wild Frontier (1955) as George Russel (archive footage)
- Davy Crockett and the River Pirates (1956) as George Russel (archive footage)
- Attack (1956) as Sfc. Tolliver - Fox Co.
- Between Heaven and Hell (1956) as Pvt. Willie Crawford
- Mission of Danger (1959, based on three Northwest Passage TV episodes) as Hunk Marriner (archive footage)
- Frontier Rangers (1959) as Sergeant Hunk Marriner (archive footage)
- Breakfast at Tiffany's (1961) as Doc Golightly
- Westinghouse Presents: That's Where the Town Is Going (1962, TV Movie) as George Prebble
- The Interns (1962) as Dr. Sidney Wohl
- Mail Order Bride (1964) as Will Lane
- Mr. Kingston (1964, TV Movie)
- The One and Only, Genuine, Original Family Band (1968) as Calvin Bower
- The Andersonville Trial (1970, TV Movie) as Dr. John Bates
- Gunsmoke (1971, S17E11 "Drago") as Drago
- The Daughters of Joshua Cabe (1972, TV Movie) as Joshua Cabe
- The Horror at 37,000 Feet (1973, TV Movie) as Glenn Farlee
- Tom Sawyer (1973, TV Movie) as Muff Potter
- The President's Plane is Missing (1973, TV Movie) as Vice President Kermit Madigan
- Smash-Up on Interstate 5 (1976, TV Movie) as Al Pearson
- Leave Yesterday Behind (1978, TV Movie) as Doc
- The Bastard (1978, TV Movie) as Benjamin Edes
- The Critical List (1978, TV Movie) as Charles Sprague
- The Paradise Connection (1979, TV Movie) as Stuart Douglas
- Return of the Beverly Hillbillies (1981, TV Movie) as Jed Clampett
- Fire on the Mountain (1981, TV Movie) as John Vogelin
- Stone Fox (1987, TV Movie) as Grandpa
- Working Tra$h (1990, TV Movie) as Vandevere Lodge
- The Beverly Hillbillies (1993) as Barnaby Jones (cameo)

=== Television ===
- Northwest Passage (1958–1959) as Sergeant Hunk Marriner in 26 episodes
- Bonanza (1959) as Sheriff Jesse Sanders in the episode "The Sisters"
- Maverick (1959) as Sheriff Scratch Mannon in the episode "The Cats of Paradise"
- Riverboat (1960), as Niles Cox in "The Water of Gorgeous Springs"
- The Twilight Zone (1961) as Jimbo Cobb in "The Prime Mover"
- Gunsmoke (1960) as Hannibal Bass in "Old Fool"
- Have Gun Will Travel (1961) as Elmo Crane in "El Paso Stage"
- The Barbara Stanwyck Show (1961) as Dr. Mark Carroll in "Little Big Mouth"
- The Andy Griffith Show (1961) as David Browne in "Opie's Hobo Friend"
- Gunsmoke (1961) as Print Quimby in the episode "All That"
- Rawhide (1962) as Doctor George Stimson in "The Pitchwagon"
- The Beverly Hillbillies (1962–1971) as Jed Clampett in 274 episodes
- Gunsmoke (1971) as Drago in the episode "Drago"
- Hawaii Five-O (1971) as Professor Ambrose Pierce (a criminal mastermind) in the episode "3,000 Crooked Miles to Honolulu"
- Bonanza (1972) as Cactus Murphy in "The Saddle Stiff"
- Alias Smith and Jones (1972) as Phil Archer in "High Lonesome Country"
- Barnaby Jones (1973–1980) as Barnaby Jones in 178 episodes
- Cannon (1975) as Barnaby Jones in "The Deadly Conspiracy: Part 1"
- Hardcastle and McCormick (1983) as Himself in "Killer B's"
- Matt Houston (1984–1985) as Roy Houston in 22 episodes
- Burke's Law (1994) as Louie Pike in "Who Killed Nick Hazard?"
- King of the Hill (1999) as Chet Elderson (voice) in "A Firefighting We Will Go"

=== Books (as author) ===
- Polynesian Concept, with George A. Gunston (1972)
- The Other Side of Oz, with Stephen Cox (1994)
- Kelly's Quest (2000)
- Sizzling Cold Case, with Darlene Quinn
