= Flying Colors (musical) =

Musical

- Original Sheet Music
- Music: Arthur Schwartz; Howard Dietz
- Lyrics: Arthur Schwartz; Howard Dietz
- Book: Arthur Schwartz; Howard Dietz; George S. Kaufman; Corey Ford; Charles Sherman
- Productions: 1932 Broadway

Flying Colors is a musical revue with a book, lyrics, and music by Arthur Schwartz and Howard Dietz and sketch contributions by George S. Kaufman, Corey Ford, and Charles Sherman.

The Broadway production opened on September 15, 1932 at the Imperial Theatre, closing on January 25, 1933, after 188 performances.

Directed by Dietz and choreographed by Albertina Rasch, the cast included Clifton Webb, Patsy Kelly, Imogene Coca, Larry Adler, Charles Butterworth, Tamara Geva, Buddy and Vilma Ebsen, and Billie Yarbo.

== Songs ==
Act 1

- "Lost in a Crowd" (written in collaboration with Charles Sherman)
- "Sister Act"
- "Service"
- "Fatal Fascination"
- "All's Well"
- "Two-Faced Woman"
- "Alone Together" - Clifton Webb and Tamara Geva
- "Louisiana Hayride" - Monette Moore, Clifton Webb and Tamara Geva

Act 2

- "On the American Plan" (written in collaboration with George S. Kaufman)
- "A Rainy Day"
- "My Heart Is Part of You"
- "Butlers" - Billie Yarbo
- "Day After Day"
- "A Shine on Your Shoes" - Vilma and Buddy Ebsen, Monette Moore, Larry Adler
- "It Was Never Like This"
- "Mother Told Me So"
- "A Christmas Card"
- "Now That the Party Is Over"
- "Just Around the Corner"
- "Smokin' Reefers"

== Special effects ==
For the first act finale, "Louisiana Hayride", the designer Norman Bel Geddes used a movie film to give "focal depth to a fluid and enrapturing vista."
