= Marjorie Lane =

American singer (1912–2012)

Marjorie Lane (February 21, 1912 – October 2, 2012) was an American singer of the 1930s. She is best known for providing the singing voice of actress Eleanor Powell's characters in the movies Born to Dance (1936), Broadway Melody of 1936, Rosalie (1937), and Broadway Melody of 1938.

Lane was married to the Irish-American actor Brian Donlevy from 1936 to 1947, and they had one daughter. Donlevy filed for divorce after, having hired a detective, he learnt that she was in a "hotel in a compromising position". Lane's career in film did not extend beyond the 1930s. She was often confused with a Broadway performer of the same name, who began appearing on Broadway in 1913. Lane lived in Santa Monica, California, where she died on October 2, 2012, at the age of 100.
