= USS Pocatello =

US Navy Tacoma-class ship

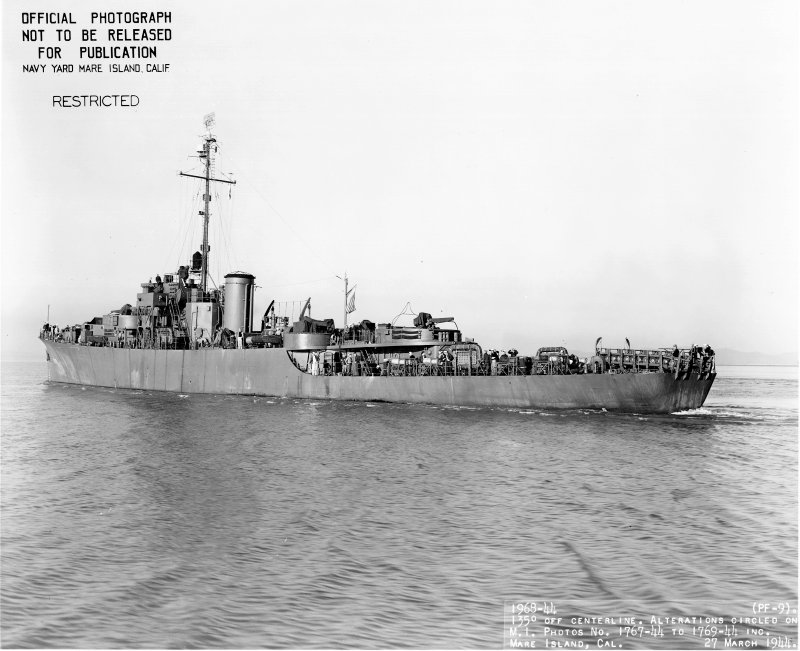
- USS Pocatello (PF-9)

History

United States
- Name: Pocatello
- Namesake: City of Pocatello, Idaho
- Reclassified: Patrol Frigate (PF), 15 April 1943
- Ordered: as a Type S2-S2-AQ1 hull, MCE hull 1427
- Builder: Permanente Metals Richmond Shipyard #4, Richmond, California
- Yard number: 52
- Laid down: 17 August 1943
- Launched: 17 October 1943
- Commissioned: 18 February 1944
- Decommissioned: 2 May 1946
- Stricken: 5 June 1947
- Identification: Hull symbol: PG-116; Hull symbol: PF-8; Call sign: NHAL
- Fate: Sold for scrap, September 1947

General characteristics
- Class & type: Tacoma-class frigate patrol frigate
- Displacement: 1,430 long tons (1,450 t) (light load); 2,415 long tons (2,454 t) (full load)
- Length: 303 ft 11 in (92.63 m)
- Beam: 37 ft 6 in (11.43 m)
- Draft: 13 ft 8 in (4.17 m)
- Installed power: 2 × 3-Drum express boilers , 240 psi (1,700 kPa); 5,500 ihp (4,100 kW)
- Propulsion: 2 × Vertical triple-expansion steam engine; 2 × shafts
- Speed: 20.3 kn (37.6 km/h; 23.4 mph)
- Complement: 190
- Armament: 3 × 3 in (76 mm)/50 caliber dual-purpose (DP) gun; 2 × twin 40 mm (1.57 in) Bofors anti-aircraft (AA) gun mounts; 9 × 20 mm (0.79 in) Oerlikon cannon AA gun mounts; 2 × Depth charge tracks; 8 × Depth charge projectors; 1 × Hedgehog

USS Pocatello (PG-117/PF-9), a Tacoma-class patrol frigate, in commission in the United States Navy between 1944 and 1946. She was the only ship of the United States Navy to be named for Pocatello, Idaho.

== Construction and commissioning ==
Pocatello, originally classified as patrol gunboat, PG-117, was reclassified as a patrol frigate, PF-9, on 15 April 1943. She was laid down on 17 August 1943, under a Maritime Commission (MARCOM) contract, MC hull 1427, at the Permanente Metals Richmond Shipyard #4, Richmond, California. Pocatello was launched on 17 October 1943, sponsored by Miss Thelma Dixey, a great-granddaughter of Chief Pocatello; manned by a Coast Guard crew; and commissioned on 18 February 1944.

== Service history ==
After fitting out at General Engineering and Drydock Company, in Alameda, California, and shakedown out of San Diego, through 28 April, Pocatello was assigned to Commander, Western Sea Frontier, and directed to commence weather station operations out of Seattle, Washington. Departing San Francisco, on 17 May, she arrived at Seattle, on 22 June. One month later she commenced her first patrol on Weather Station Able.

The actor Buddy Ebsen served aboard Pocatello. He applied for a commission in the US Navy but was turned down; even though he was teaching seamanship to Naval Reserve OCS candidate at the time. He then applied for and received a commission as a Lieutenant (junior grade) in the US Coast Guard, and was the Damage Control Officer, and later became the Executive Officer aboard the USS Pocatello and served on her from February 1944 until 16 October 1945.

Pocatello's weather station was approximately 1,500 miles (1,300 nmi; 2,400 km) west of Seattle. Patrols consisted of thirty days at sea followed by ten days in port at Seattle. Pocatello alternated on station with the Coast Guard cutter Haida (WPG-45), and had completed a dozen patrols by the war's end. Pocatello was then laid up on the west coast. Scheduled for disposal, she shifted to Charleston, South Carolina, arriving there on 6 April 1946, and decommissioning there on 2 May. Pocatello was subsequently sold at Charleston, in September 1947, to J. C. Berkwit and Company of New York City.

== Bibliography ==
- "Pocatello". Dictionary of American Naval Fighting Ships. Naval History and Heritage Command. 24 August 2015. This article incorporates text from this source, which is in the public domain.
- "Kaiser Permanente No. 4, Richmond CA". ShipbuildingHistory.com. 5 February 2014.
- "Pocatello (PF 9)". NavSource.
- "Ebsen, Christian Rudolph, Jr., LT". Togetherweserved.com.
