= Broadway Melody of 1938 =

1937 film by Roy Del Ruth

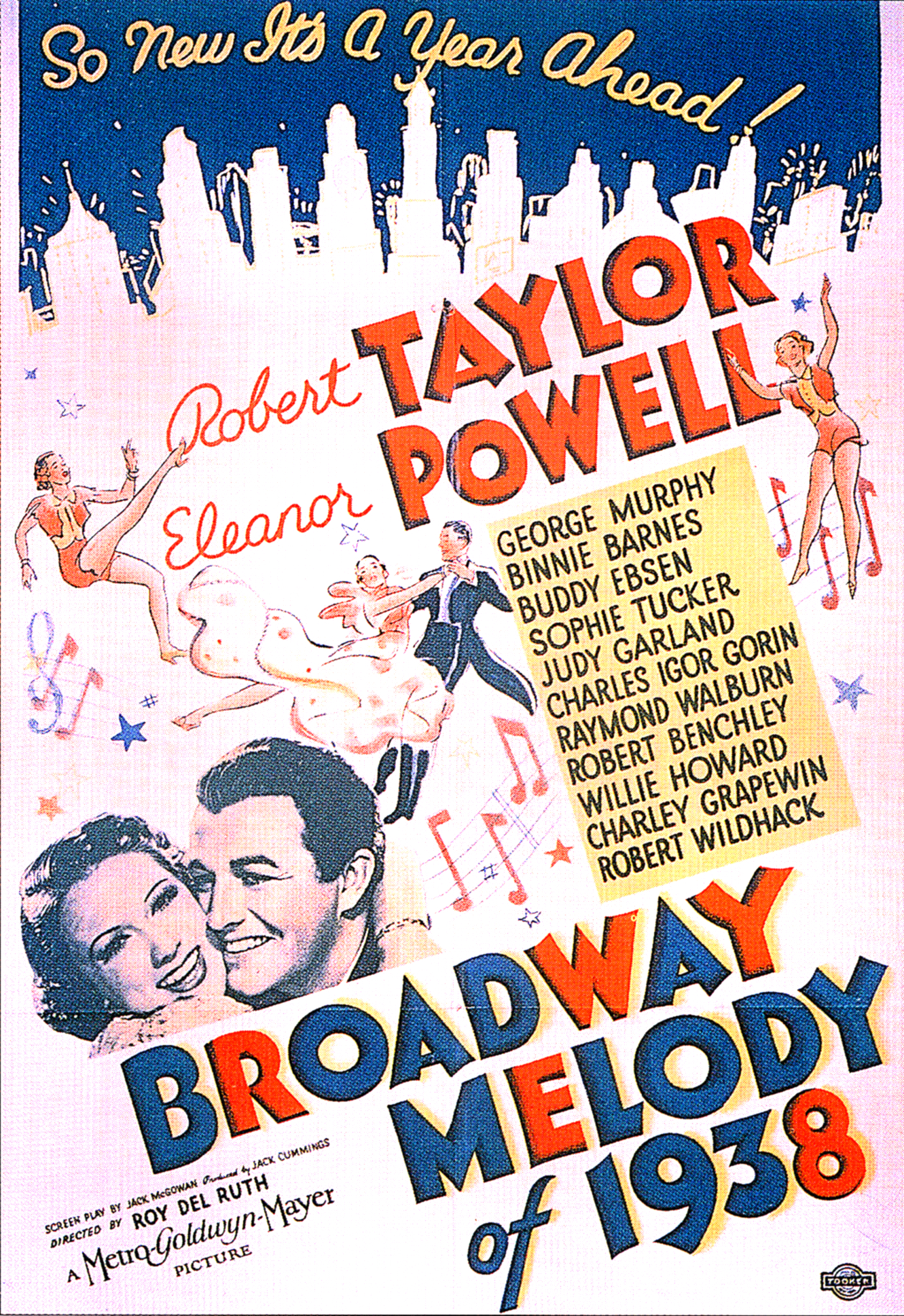
- Theatrical release poster
- Directed by: Roy Del Ruth
- Written by: Jack McGowan
- Produced by: Jack Cummings
- Starring: Robert Taylor; Eleanor Powell; Judy Garland
- Cinematography: William H. Daniels
- Edited by: Blanche Sewell
- Music by: Nacio Herb Brown (songs-music); Arthur Freed (song-lyrics)
- Production company: Metro-Goldwyn-Mayer
- Distributed by: Loew's Inc.
- Release date: August 20, 1937
- Running time: 110 minutes
- Country: United States
- Language: English
- Budget: $1,588,000
- Box office: $2,846,000

Broadway Melody of 1938 is a 1937 American musical film produced by Metro-Goldwyn-Mayer and directed by Roy Del Ruth. The film is essentially a backstage musical revue, featuring high-budget sets and cinematography in the MGM musical tradition. The film stars Eleanor Powell and Robert Taylor and features Buddy Ebsen, George Murphy, Judy Garland, Sophie Tucker, Raymond Walburn, Robert Benchley and Binnie Barnes.

The film is most notable for young Garland's performance of "You Made Me Love You (I Didn't Want to Do It)", a tribute to Clark Gable which turned the teenage singer, who had been toiling in obscurity for a couple of years, into an overnight sensation, leading eventually to her being cast in The Wizard of Oz (1939) as Dorothy Gale.

== Plot ==
Young horse trainer Sally (Eleanor Powell) befriends Sonny (George Murphy) and Peter (Buddy Ebsen), who have been hired to look after a horse her family once owned. Concerned for the horse's well-being, she sneaks aboard a train taking the horse and its caretakers to New York City. En route she meets talent agent Steve Raleigh (Robert Taylor) who, impressed with her dancing and singing, sets her on the road to stardom and romance blossoms between the two. A subplot involves a boarding house for performers run by Alice (Sophie Tucker), who is trying to find a big break for young Betty (Judy Garland).

== Cast ==
- Robert Taylor as Steve Raleigh
- Eleanor Powell as Sally Lee
- George Murphy as Sonny Ledford
- Binnie Barnes as Caroline Whipple
- Buddy Ebsen as Peter Trot
- Sophie Tucker as Alice Clayton
- Judy Garland as Betty Clayton
- Charles Igor Gorin as Nicki Papaloopas
- Raymond Walburn as Herman J. Whipple
- Robert Benchley as Duffy, P.R. Man
- Willie Howard as The Waiter
- Charley Grapewin as James K. Blakeley
- Robert John Wildhack as The Sneezer
- Billy Gilbert as George Papaloopas
- Barnett Parker as Jerry Jason
- Helen Troy as Emma Snipe

== Songs ==
Songs by Brown and Freed

The majority of songs in Broadway Melody of 1938 were written by Nacio Herb Brown (music) and Arthur Freed (lyrics):

- "Broadway Melody" (1929) - in opening credits
- "You Are My Lucky Star" (1935) - in opening credits
- "Follow in My Footsteps" (1937) - sung and danced by George Murphy, Buddy Ebsen and Eleanor Powell (dubbed by Marjorie Lane)
- "Yours and Mine" (1937) - sung by Eleanor Powell (dubbed by Marjorie Lane); danced by Eleanor Powell and George Murphy; danced by Judy Garland and Buddy Ebsen
- "Everybody Sing" (1937) - sung by Judy Garland, Sophie Tucker, Barnett Parker and chorus
- "I'm Feeling Like a Million" (1937) - sung and danced by George Murphy and Eleanor Powell (dubbed by Marjorie Lane); recorded by Judy Garland but cut from the film
- "Your Broadway and My Broadway" (1937) - sung by Sophie Tucker and Charles Igor Gorin, danced by George Murphy, Eleanor Powell, Buddy Ebsen and Judy Garland; recorded by Judy Garland and chorus but cut from the film
- "Broadway Rhythm" (1935) - sung by a chorus and danced by Eleanor Powell
- "Got a Pair of New Shoes" (1937) - sung by a chorus and danced by Eleanor Powell in the finale
- "Sun Showers" (1937) - recorded by Charles Igor Gorin but cut from the film

Other songs

- "The Toreador Song" (1875) - from Carmen, by Georges Bizet (music) and Henri Meilhac and Ludovic Halévy (libretto), sung by Charles Igor Gorin in the opening scene
- "Some of These Days" (1910) - music and lyrics by Shelton Brooks, sung by Sophie Tucker
- "Largo al factotum" (1816) - from Il Barbiere di Siviglia (The Barber of Seville), by Gioacchino Rossini (music) and Cesare Sterbini (libretto), sung by Charles Igor Gorin
- "You Made Me Love You (I Didn't Want to Do It)" (1913) - by James V. Monaco (music) and Joseph McCarthy (lyrics) with special lyrics for the "Dear Mr. Gable" segment by Roger Edens; sung by Judy Garland

== Production ==
This was the third of the "Broadway Melody" series, and had the working title of Broadway Melody of 1937. When it was released, late in 1937, it was advertised with the tagline So new it's a year ahead!.

MGM borrowed Binnie Barnes from Universal Pictures for the film.

The film was in production from late February to 20 July 1937, and was released on 20 August. Its initial running time was 115 minutes, compared to the final running time of 110 minutes.

Judy Garland's number, "You Made Me Love You (I Didn't Want to Do It)" has been cited as her first great film success. The song was specially prepared by Roger Edens for Clark Gable's 36th birthday as a present, and Garland sang it at the party given by MGM. Producer Louis B. Mayer was so impressed he ordered that it be included in the next possible musical MGM was producing. Following the sensational audience reaction to the song, Garland was rushed into shooting two more films back to back, Thoroughbreds Don't Cry (1937) and the more musically elaborate Everybody Sing, which was held for later release in 1938.

The finale of the film takes place on a giant set upon which neon signs are visible showing the names of famous stage and screen stars. During Sophie Tucker's final number, all of the signs in the background actually change to read "Sophie Tucker" in tribute to her.

== Critical reception ==
Variety gave a positive review but felt that the film was too long and described this as a "serious fault." It applauded Buddy Ebsen for his "first class comedy bits ... in addition to his eccentric dancing", but reserved most praise for Sophie Tucker and Judy Garland "who ... stand out like traffic lights." It continued, "when [Tucker] walks on the screens something happens. You can hear what the others are saying, but Miss Tucker is the only one you see. It's as if all that energy of more than a score of years in vaudeville has been recharged and served up in one package. Then she steps back and pushes Judy Garland, still in her teens, into the camera foreground. Young Miss Garland gives them "Everybody Sing" with a Tucker undertone, and it's worth a letter to the homefolks. Coming near the picture's opening, these two give the film a great kickoff. Each does numbers solo later on. Judy sings a plaint to Clark Gable's photograph which is as close to great screen acting as pictures have furnished." The only performer who wasn't well received was Robert Taylor, and Variety commented "There is no spot in a revue of this kind for Taylor, who neither sings nor dances ... He is lost against fast moving musical talent."

== Accolades ==
The film is recognized by American Film Institute in these lists:

- 2004: AFI's 100 Years...100 Songs:
  - "Dear Mr. Gable (You Made Me Love You)" – Nominated

== Box office ==
According to MGM records the film earned $1,889,000 in the US and Canada and $957,000 elsewhere resulting in a profit of $271,000.

== In popular culture ==
- A 1937 Our Gang comedy, Our Gang Follies of 1938, spoofs the title, concept, and style of Broadway Melody of 1938.
- Judy Garland singing "You Made Me Love You" to a picture of Clark Gable gets parodied in the 2007 musical film Hairspray when Link (Zac Efron) sings to a picture, of Tracy (Nikki Blonsky), who comes to life to sing with him.
- Tom Lehrer, in a song satirising George Murphy's election to the U.S. Senate, sang, "Imagine Broadway Melody of 1984".
- A song on Genesis' album The Lamb Lies Down on Broadway is entitled "Broadway Melody of 1974".
