= In the Still of the Night (Cole Porter song) =

Song
- Published: 1937 by Chappell & Co.
- Songwriter: Cole Porter

"In the Still of the Night" is a popular orchestral jazz standard written by Cole Porter for the MGM film Rosalie. The song was performed by Nelson Eddy and published in 1937. The song has been regarded by its lyrics and instrumental composition.

== Origin ==
After the success of the Broadway production Rosalie, Cole Porter was approached by MGM to produce the soundtrack to the film adaptation.

Initially Nelson Eddy, one of the lead performers, complained about the composition. As detailed in Cole Porter: A Biography, Eddy claimed he found the number difficult to sing and asked Cole to create another one for him in its place. Cole approached Louis B. Mayer, the producer of the film and MGM's co-founder to keep the song. Mayer decided to keep the song due to its emotional impact.

== Notable recordings ==
Two popular early recordings were by Tommy Dorsey (vocal by Jack Leonard) and by Leo Reisman (vocal by Lee Sullivan). Dorsey's charted on October 16, 1937 and peaked at No. 3. Reisman's charted on December 25, 1937 and peaked at No. 9.

Ella Fitzgerald performed a version that was released as part of an LP released in 1956 consisting entirely of Cole Porter standards, which became her most critically acclaimed album.

A version by the male classical vocal ensemble Chanticleer was nominated for arranging at the 39th Annual Grammy Awards.
