= List of Metro-Goldwyn-Mayer films (1950–1959) =

The following is a list of films originally produced and/or distributed theatrically by Metro-Goldwyn-Mayer and released in the 1950s.

== 1950 ==
Release date	Title	Notes
January 13, 1950	Ambush	
February 2, 1950	Key to the City	
March 1, 1950	The Outriders	
March 10, 1950	Nancy Goes to Rio	
March 12, 1950	Black Hand	
March 24, 1950	Conspirator	Made by MGM-British
April 7, 1950	The Yellow Cab Man	
May 5, 1950	The Reformer and the Redhead	
May 11, 1950	Stars In My Crown	
May 12, 1950	Please Believe Me	
May 12, 1950	The Asphalt Jungle	
May 17, 1950	Annie Get Your Gun	
May 19, 1950	Shadow on the Wall	
May 23, 1950	Side Street	
May 26, 1950	The Big Hangover	
June 16, 1950	Father of the Bride	Nominated for Academy Award for Best Picture
June 29, 1950	The Skipper Surprised His Wife	
June 29, 1950	The Next Voice You Hear...	
July 7, 1950	Crisis	
July 7, 1950	The Happy Years	
July 12, 1950	Three Little Words	
July 14, 1950	Duchess of Idaho	
July 28, 1950	Mystery Street	
August 3, 1950	A Lady Without Passport	
August 24, 1950	The Toast of New Orleans	
August 31, 1950	Summer Stock	
September 1, 1950	A Life of Her Own	
September 15, 1950	Devil's Doorway	
October 6, 1950	Right Cross	
October 13, 1950	To Please a Lady	
October 26, 1950	The Miniver Story	
November 3, 1950	Dial 1119	
November 10, 1950	Two Weeks with Love	
November 24, 1950	King Solomon's Mines	Nominated for Academy Award for Best Picture.
December 7, 1950	Kim	
December 8, 1950	Mrs. O'Malley and Mr. Malone	
December 11, 1950	Watch the Birdie	
December 29, 1950	Pagan Love Song	

== 1951 ==
Release date	Title	Notes
January 18, 1951	The Magnificent Yankee	
January 19, 1951	Grounds for Marriage	
February 4, 1951	Vengeance Valley	Public domain
March 1, 1951	Three Guys Named Mike	
March 2, 1951	Mr. Imperium	Public domain
March 12, 1951	The Metro-Goldwyn-Mayer Story	A compilation film of MGM's 1951 slate of releases
March 15, 1951	Inside Straight	
March 16, 1951	The Red Badge of Courage	
March 23, 1951	Royal Wedding	Public domain
March 29, 1951	Soldiers Three	
March 30, 1951	Cause for Alarm!	Public domain
April 5, 1951	Teresa	
April 16, 1951	The Great Caruso	
April 27, 1951	Father's Little Dividend	sequel to Father of the Bride; Public domain
May 4, 1951	The Painted Hills	Public domain
May 18, 1951	Home Town Story	
May 24, 1951	Go for Broke!	Public domain
June 8, 1951	Night into Morning	
June 15, 1951	No Questions Asked	
June 20, 1951	Kind Lady	
June 29, 1951	Excuse My Dust	
July 3, 1951	Strictly Dishonorable	
July 9, 1951	Rich, Young and Pretty	
July 20, 1951	The Law and the Lady	
August 17, 1951	The Tall Target	
August 31, 1951	The Strip	
September 1, 1951	The People Against O'Hara	
September 7, 1951	Angels in the Outfield	
September 24, 1951	Show Boat	
October 5, 1951	Texas Carnival	
October 12, 1951	Bannerline	
October 15, 1951	Pandora and the Flying Dutchman	US distribution only; produced by Dorkay Productions
October 23, 1951	Across the Wide Missouri	
November 11, 1951	An American in Paris	Winner of the Academy Award for Best Picture
November 15, 1951	Callaway Went Thataway	
November 16, 1951	The Unknown Man	
November 20, 1951	It's a Big Country	
November 22, 1951	Too Young to Kiss	
November 27, 1951	The Man with a Cloak	
December 14, 1951	Calling Bulldog Drummond	
December 25, 1951	Quo Vadis	Nominated for Academy Award for Best Picture
December 31, 1951	Westward the Women	

== 1952 ==
Release date	Title	Notes
January 16, 1952	The Light Touch	
January 29, 1952	Invitation	
February 8, 1952	Lone Star	
February 22, 1952	The Belle of New York	
February 23, 1952	Love Is Better Than Ever	
February 27, 1952	Just This Once	
March 28, 1952	The Wild North	
April 11, 1952	Singin' in the Rain	
April 18, 1952	Talk About a Stranger	
April 24, 1952	Carbine Williams	
May 2, 1952	Young Man with Ideas	
May 11, 1952	When in Rome	
May 23, 1952	The Girl in White	
May 28, 1952	Skirts Ahoy!	
May 29, 1952	Lovely to Look At	
May 30, 1952	The Sellout	
June 6, 1952	Glory Alley	
June 13, 1952	Pat and Mike	
June 27, 1952	Scaramouche	
July 18, 1952	Washington Story	
July 18, 1952	You for Me	
July 18, 1952	Shadow in the Sky	
July 25, 1952	Holiday for Sinners	
July 31, 1952	Ivanhoe	Nominated for Academy Award for Best Picture
August 15, 1952	Fearless Fagan	
September 5, 1952	The Merry Widow	
September 5, 1952	My Man and I	
September 19, 1952	The Devil Makes Three	
September 25, 1952	Because You're Mine	
September 25, 1952	Apache War Smoke	
October 31, 1952	Everything I Have Is Yours	
November 14, 1952	The Prisoner of Zenda	
November 19, 1952	Desperate Search	
November 21, 1952	The Hour of 13	
November 28, 1952	Plymouth Adventure	
December 4, 1952	Million Dollar Mermaid	
December 5, 1952	The Hoaxters	Documentary feature
December 12, 1952	Sky Full of Moon	
December 25, 1952	The Bad and the Beautiful	

== 1953 ==
Release date	Title	Notes
January 2, 1953	Above and Beyond	
January 16, 1953	The Clown	
February 1, 1953	The Naked Spur	
February 13, 1953	Rogue's March	
March 6, 1953	Battle Circus	
March 13, 1953	Confidentially Connie	
March 20, 1953	I Love Melvin	
March 26, 1953	The Story of Three Loves	
March 27, 1953	The Girl Who Had Everything	
March 30, 1953	Jeopardy	
April 10, 1953	Small Town Girl	
April 17, 1953	Bright Road	
April 22, 1953	Sombrero	
April 24, 1953	Code Two	
May 1, 1953	Never Let Me Go	
May 8, 1953	Cry of the Hunted	
May 15, 1953	Remains to Be Seen	
May 17, 1953	Scandal at Scourie	
May 22, 1953	Fast Company	
May 29, 1953	Young Bess	
June 4, 1953	Julius Caesar	Nominated for Academy Award for Best Picture
June 5, 1953	A Slight Case of Larceny	
June 19, 1953	Dream Wife	
June 24, 1953	Arena	MGM's first 3D film
July 3, 1953	Dangerous When Wet	
July 10, 1953	Lili	
July 14, 1953	Terror on a Train	
July 17, 1953	Ride, Vaquero!	
August 7, 1953	The Band Wagon	
August 14, 1953	The Affairs of Dobie Gillis	
August 19, 1953	Big Leaguer	
August 28, 1953	Latin Lovers	
September 4, 1953	Half a Hero	
September 25, 1953	The Actress	
October 1, 1953	Torch Song	
October 9, 1953	Mogambo	
October 13, 1953	Main Street to Broadway	Distribution only; produced by Cinema Productions
October 30, 1953	Take the High Ground!	
November 13, 1953	All the Brothers Were Valiant	
November 26, 1953	Kiss Me Kate	MGM's second 3D film
December 3, 1953	Give a Girl a Break	
December 4, 1953	Escape from Fort Bravo	
December 25, 1953	Easy to Love	
December 30, 1953	Saadia	

== 1954 ==
Release date	Title	Notes
January 15, 1954	Knights of the Round Table	MGM's first CinemaScope film, licensed from 20th Century Fox
January 29, 1954	The Great Diamond Robbery	
February 18, 1954	The Long, Long Trailer	
March 5, 1954	Tennessee Champ	
April 1, 1954	Rose Marie	
April 2, 1954	Gypsy Colt	
April 16, 1954	Rhapsody	
May 4, 1954	Prisoner of War	
May 5, 1954	Flame and the Flesh	
May 6, 1954	Executive Suite	
May 7, 1954	Men of the Fighting Lady	
June 15, 1954	The Student Prince	
July 22, 1954	Seven Brides for Seven Brothers	Nominated for Academy Award for Best Picture; Laserdisc release contains the Live-action Short Film from MGM Jubilee Overture.
July 23, 1954	Valley of the Kings	
August 11, 1954	Her Twelve Men	
September 7, 1954	Betrayed	
September 8, 1954	Brigadoon	
September 17, 1954	Rogue Cop	
October 6, 1954	Beau Brummell	
November 4, 1954	Athena	
November 18, 1954	The Last Time I Saw Paris	Public domain
December 6, 1954	Seagulls Over Sorrento	
December 24, 1954	Deep in My Heart	Laserdisc release contains the Short Film Heavenly Music from 1943.
December 29, 1954	Green Fire	

== 1955 ==
Release date	Title	Notes
January 7, 1955	Bad Day at Black Rock	
February 4, 1955	Many Rivers to Cross	
February 18, 1955	Jupiter's Darling	
March 4, 1955	Hit the Deck	
March 24, 1955	The Glass Slipper	
March 25, 1955	Blackboard Jungle	
April 28, 1955	Bedevilled	
May 5, 1955	Interrupted Melody	
May 6, 1955	The Prodigal	
May 20, 1955	The Marauders	
June 7, 1955	The Cobweb	
June 10, 1955	Love Me or Leave Me	
June 24, 1955	Moonfleet	
June 24, 1955	Svengali	US distribution only; produced in the UK by Alderdale Films
July 29, 1955	The Scarlet Coat	
August 5, 1955	The King's Thief	
September 2, 1955	It's Always Fair Weather	
October 7, 1955	Trial	
October 8, 1955	Kismet	
November 3, 1955	Guys and Dolls	Distribution only, produced by Samuel Goldwyn Productions (Note: Owned by Samuel Goldwyn Jr. Family Trust, with U.S. distribution rights currently licensed to Miramax Films and Warner Bros. Pictures)
November 4, 1955	The Tender Trap	
November 23, 1955	Quentin Durward	
December 23, 1955	It's a Dog's Life	
December 25, 1955	I'll Cry Tomorrow	

== 1956 ==
Release date	Title	Notes
January 12, 1956	Diane	
January 24, 1956	Ransom!	
February 9, 1956	Forever, Darling	Co-production with Zanra Productions
March 9, 1956	Meet Me in Las Vegas	
March 15, 1956	Forbidden Planet	Inducted into the National Film Registry in 2013
March 30, 1956	Tribute to a Bad Man	
April 26, 1956	The Swan	First film to use George the lion
April 30, 1956	The Last Hunt	
May 1, 1956	Bhowani Junction	
May 9, 1956	Gaby	
May 15, 1956	Invitation to the Dance	Last film to use Tanner the lion; the film's shooting was completed in 1954
May 17, 1956	The Wedding in Monaco	A Citel Monaco production made by Metro-Goldwyn-Mayer (feature documentary); Produced with the cooperation of Compagnie Francaise de Films
June 14, 1956	The Catered Affair	
July 5, 1956	Somebody Up There Likes Me	
July 12, 1956	The Fastest Gun Alive	
July 17, 1956	High Society	Co-production with Sol C. Siegel Productions and Bing Crosby Productions; Musical remake of The Philadelphia Story; Inducted into the National Film Registry in 2025
August 17, 1956	These Wilder Years	
September 17, 1956	Lust for Life	
September 26, 1956	The Power and the Prize	
September 27, 1956	Tea and Sympathy	
October 17, 1956	Julie	Co-production with Arwin Productions
October 26, 1956	The Opposite Sex	
November 2, 1956	The Rack	Last film to use Jackie the lion
November 25, 1956	Friendly Persuasion	Nominated for the Academy Award for Best Picture; Foreign distribution only; US distribution by Allied Artists
November 28, 1956	The Great American Pastime	
November 29, 1956	The Teahouse of the August Moon	

== 1957 ==
Release date	Title	Notes
January 7, 1957	The Iron Petticoat	Distribution only; produced by Hope Records and Benhar Productions; Presented by Harry Saltzman in association with Remus Films (Note: Owned by Hope Enterprises, Inc. and ITV Studios Global Entertainment)
January 16, 1957	The Barretts of Wimpole Street	
January 18, 1957	Slander	
January 29, 1957	Edge of the City	
February 15, 1957	Hot Summer Night	
February 22, 1957	The Wings of Eagles	
April 3, 1957	Ten Thousand Bedrooms	
April 4, 1957	Lizzie	Co-production with Bryna Productions
April 12, 1957	Tarzan and the Lost Safari	Distribution only; produced by Sol Lesser Productions
May 2, 1957	The Living Idol	
May 3, 1957	The Little Hut	Distribution only; produced by Herbson, S.A. of Switzerland
May 8, 1957	The Vintage	
May 10, 1957	Something of Value	
May 14, 1957	This Could Be the Night	
May 16, 1957	Designing Woman	
June 20, 1957	The Happy Road	Distribution only; produced by Kerry Productions
June 28, 1957	The Seventh Sin	
July 12, 1957	Decision Against Time	Distribution only; produced by Ealing Films
July 18, 1957	Silk Stockings	Co-production with Arthur Freed Productions
July 19, 1957	Gun Glory	
August 22, 1957	Man on Fire	Co-production with Sol C. Siegel Productions and Bing Crosby Productions
August 30, 1957	Action of the Tiger	Distribution only; produced by Claridge Film Productions and Van Johnson Enterprises
September 6, 1957	Tip on a Dead Jockey	First film to feature Leo, the eighth and current MGM lion.
September 12, 1957	House of Numbers	
September 20, 1957	The Hired Gun	Co-production with Calhoun-Orsatti Enterprises (A Rorvic presentation)
October 3, 1957	Les Girls	Co-production with Sol C. Siegel Productions
October 8, 1957	Until They Sail	
October 25, 1957	The Invisible Boy	Co-production with Pan Productions
November 8, 1957	Jailhouse Rock	Co-production with Avon Productions
November 14, 1957	Don't Go Near the Water	Co-production with Avon Productions
December 20, 1957	Raintree County	
December 21, 1957	All at Sea	Distribution only; produced by Ealing Films

== 1958 ==
Release date	Title	Notes
January 30, 1958	Seven Hills of Rome	Co-production with St. Cloud Productions and Gregor Productions
February 14, 1958	Underwater Warrior	Co-production with Ivan Tors Pictures and Hunterhaven; made by Underwater Productions
February 20, 1958	The Brothers Karamazov	Co-production with Avon Productions
March 5, 1958	I Accuse!	
March 5, 1958	The Safecracker	Distribution only; produced by in the UK by Coronado Productions
March 20, 1958	Saddle the Wind	
April 4, 1958	Merry Andrew	Co-production with Sol C. Siegel Productions and Danny Kaye
April 18, 1958	Handle with Care	
May 2, 1958	Cry Terror!	Co-production with Andrew L. Stone, Inc.
May 7, 1958	The Sheepman	
May 15, 1958	Gigi	Co-production with Arthur Freed Productions; Winner of the Academy Award for Best Picture
May 16, 1958	The High Cost of Loving	
June 6, 1958	The Law and Jake Wade	
June 13, 1958	High School Confidential	Co-production with Albert Zugsmith Productions
July 3, 1958	The Haunted Strangler	Distribution only; made in the UK by Amalgamated Productions
July 3, 1958	Fiend Without a Face	Distribution only; made in the UK by Amalgamated Productions
August 14, 1958	The Reluctant Debutante	Co-production with Avon Productions
August 15, 1958	Tarzan's Fight for Life	Distribution only; produced by Sol Lesser Productions
August 20, 1958	Imitation General	
September 3, 1958	The Badlanders	Co-production with Arcola Pictures Corporation
September 10, 1958	Dunkirk (Note: Owned by StudioCanal, with U.S. distribution rights currently licensed to Film Movement)	Distribution only; produced by Ealing Films
September 20, 1958	Cat on a Hot Tin Roof	Co-production with Avon Productions; Nominated for Academy Award for Best Picture
October 10, 1958	The Decks Ran Red	Co-production with Andrew L. Stone, Inc.
October 24, 1958	Torpedo Run	
October 28, 1958	Party Girl	Co-production with Euterpe
November 21, 1958	The Tunnel of Love	Distribution only; produced by Fields Productions and Arwin Productions
December 17, 1958	The Doctor's Dilemma	Distribution only; produced by Comet Film Productions
December 18, 1958	Some Came Running	Co-production with Sol C. Siegel Productions
December 22, 1958	Tom Thumb	Distribution only; produced by Galaxy Pictures and shot at MGM-British Studios
December 22, 1958	Andy Hardy Comes Home	16th, and final, entry in the Andy Hardy film series Co-production with Fryman Enterprises

== 1959 ==
Release date	Title	Notes
1959	Frontier Rangers	Composed of episodes of the TV series Northwest Passage; only released theatrically overseas
February 19, 1959	The Journey	Co-production with Alby Productions
February 27, 1959	First Man Into Space	Distribution only; made by Amalgamated Productions
March 4, 1959	Night of the Quarter Moon	Co-production with Albert Zugsmith Productions
March 11, 1959	Nowhere to Go	Distribution only; produced in the UK by Ealing Films
March 19, 1959	Green Mansions	
April 23, 1959	Count Your Blessings	
April 29, 1959	The Mating Game	
May 15, 1959	The Mysterians	US distribution only; made in Japan by Toho and copyrighted in the US by RKO Teleradio Pictures
May 20, 1959	The World, the Flesh, and the Devil	Co-production with Sol C. Siegel Productions and Harbel Productions
May 21, 1959	Ask Any Girl	Co-production with Euterpe
June 10, 1959	The Naked Maja	UK and International Distribution only; Co-production with United Artists, S.G.C. and Titanus (Note: Owned by and retained by Amazon MGM Studios via MGM itself, instead of Turner Entertainment Co.)
July 1, 1959	Watusi	
July 1, 1959	North by Northwest	
July 3, 1959	The Beat Generation	Co-production with Albert Zugsmith Productions (Note: Owned by Paramount Pictures via Melange Pictures LLC)
July 29, 1959	The Angry Hills	Distribution only; produced by Raymond Productions
August 6, 1959	The Scapegoat	Distribution only; produced in the UK by Du Maurier-Guinness, Ltd.
August 26, 1959	For the First Time	Co-production with Corona Filmproduktion and Orion Films
August 1959	The Big Operator	Co-production with Albert Zugsmith Productions and Fryman Enterprises
September 4, 1959	It Started with a Kiss	Co-production with Arcola Pictures Corporation
October 5, 1959	Girls Town	Co-production with Albert Zugsmith Productions
October 23, 1959	Libel	
October 29, 1959	The House of the Seven Hawks	Distribution only; produced in the UK by Coronado Productions
October 1959	Tarzan, the Ape Man	
November 6, 1959	The Wreck of the Mary Deare	Co-production with Julian Blaustein Productions and Baroda Productions
November 18, 1959	Ben-Hur	Winner of the Academy Award for Best Picture; Remake of the 1925 film
December 7, 1959	Never So Few	Co-production with Canterbury Productions
December 18, 1959	The Gazebo	Co-production with Avon Productions

== See also ==
- Lists of Metro-Goldwyn-Mayer films
