= Helen Rose =

American costume designer (1904–1985)

- Helen Bromberg
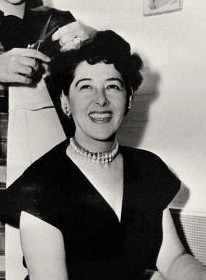
- Rose in 1954
- Born: February 2, 1904; Chicago, Illinois, U.S.
- Died: November 9, 1985 (aged 81); Palm Springs, California, U.S.
- Occupation: Costume designer
- Spouse: Harry V. Rose
- Children: 1

Helen Rose (February 2, 1904 – November 9, 1985) was an American costume designer and clothing designer who spent the bulk of her career with Metro-Goldwyn-Mayer.

== Career ==
Helen Rose was born on February 2, 1904, to William Bromberg and Ray Bobbs in Chicago, Illinois of German Jewish and Russian Jewish descent.

She attended the Chicago Academy of Fine Arts and then designed nightclub and stage costumes for various acts. She moved to Los Angeles in 1929, where she designed outfits for Fanchon and Marco and later the Ice Follies. In the early 1940s, she spent two years working for 20th Century Fox, where she designed wardrobes for musical selections. In 1943, MGM hired her in the wake of Adrian's departure, and by the late 1940s, Rose was promoted to chief designer at the studio.

In 1956, Rose designed the wedding dress worn by Grace Kelly for her marriage to Rainier III, Prince of Monaco.

In the late 1960s, Rose left the studio to open her own design business and continued to provide attire for the famed and the wealthy. She also wrote a fashion column. She wrote two books: her autobiography Just Make Them Beautiful in 1976 and The Glamorous World of Helen Rose. In the 1970s, Rose also staged a traveling fashion show featuring some of her MGM-designed costumes that was called "The Helen Rose Show".

== Recognition ==
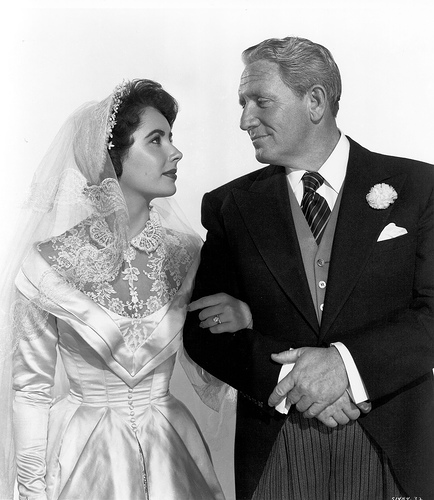
Elizabeth Taylor in the wedding dress Rose designed for Father of the Bride (1950)

Rose won two Academy Awards for Best Costume Design: for The Bad and the Beautiful in 1952 and for I'll Cry Tomorrow in 1955. She was nominated a further eight times and was well-known for designing famous bridal gowns of the era. She designed the wedding dress of Grace Kelly when she married Rainier III, Prince of Monaco in 1956. She also designed clothing for Elizabeth Taylor in the movies Father of the Bride and Cat on a Hot Tin Roof as well as Elizabeth Taylor's bridal gown when she married Conrad "Nicky" Hilton.

== Personal life ==
Rose was married to Harry V. Rose, whose birth name was Harry Rosenstein (1902–1993), and they had a daughter.

Helen Rose died in Palm Springs, California, in 1985, aged 81.

== Filmography ==
- We're in the Legion Now! (1936)
- Hello, Frisco, Hello (1943)
- Coney Island (1943)
- Stormy Weather (1943)
- Ziegfeld Follies (1945)
- The Harvey Girls (1946)
- Two Sisters from Boston (1946)
- Till the Clouds Roll By (1946)
- The Unfinished Dance (1947)
- Merton of the Movies (1947)
- Good News (1947)
- The Bride Goes Wild (1948)
- Big City (1948)
- Homecoming (1948)
- A Date with Judy (1948)
- Luxury Liner (1948)
- Words and Music (1948)
- Act of Violence (1948)
- Take Me Out to the Ball Game (1949)
- The Stratton Story (1949)
- The Red Danube (1949)
- That Midnight Kiss (1949)
- On the Town (1949)
- East Side, West Side (1949)
- Nancy Goes to Rio (1950)
- The Reformer and the Redhead (1950)
- Annie Get Your Gun (1950)
- The Big Hangover (1950)
- Father of the Bride (1950)
- Three Little Words (1950)
- Duchess of Idaho (1950)
- The Toast of New Orleans (1950)
- Summer Stock (1950) (for Gloria DeHaven)
- A Life of Her Own (1950) (for Lana Turner)
- Right Cross (1950)
- To Please a Lady (1950)
- Two Weeks with Love (1950)
- Pagan Love Song (1950)
- Grounds for Marriage (1951)
- Royal Wedding (1951) (uncredited)
- Father's Little Dividend (1951)
- The Great Caruso (1951)
- No Questions Asked (1951)
- Excuse My Dust (1951)
- Strictly Dishonorable (1951)
- Rich, Young and Pretty (1951)
- The Strip (1951)
- The People Against O'Hara (1951)
- Texas Carnival (1951)
- Callaway Went Thataway (1951)
- The Unknown Man (1951)
- Too Young to Kiss (1951)
- The Light Touch (1952)
- Invitation (1952)
- The Belle of New York (1952)
- Love Is Better Than Ever (1952)
- The Girl in White (1952)
- Skirts Ahoy! (1952)
- Glory Alley (1952)
- Washington Story (1952)
- Holiday for Sinners (1952)
- The Merry Widow (1952)
- Because You're Mine (1952)
- Everything I Have Is Yours (1952)
- Million Dollar Mermaid (1952)
- The Bad and the Beautiful (1952)
- Above and Beyond (1952)
- The Story of Three Loves (1953)
- I Love Melvin (1953)
- The Girl Who Had Everything (1953)
- Jeopardy (1953) (for Barbara Stanwyck)
- Small Town Girl (1953)
- Sombrero (1953)
- Remains to Be Seen (1953)
- Dangerous When Wet (1953)
- Dream Wife (1953)
- Latin Lovers (1953)
- Mogambo (1953)
- Torch Song (1953)
- Easy to Love (1953)
- Give a Girl a Break (1953)
- Escape from Fort Bravo (1953)
- The Long, Long Trailer (1954)
- Rose Marie (1954)
- Rhapsody (1954)
- Executive Suite (1954)
- The Student Prince (1954)
- Her Twelve Men (1954)
- Rogue Cop (1954)
- Athena (1954)
- The Last Time I Saw Paris (1954)
- Deep in My Heart (1954)
- Green Fire (1954) (for Grace Kelly)
- Jupiter's Darling (1955)
- Hit the Deck (1955)
- The Glass Slipper (1955)
- Interrupted Melody (1955)
- Bedevilled (1955) (for Anne Baxter)
- Love Me or Leave Me (1955)
- The Cobweb (1955)
- It's Always Fair Weather (1955)
- The Tender Trap (1955)
- The Rains of Ranchipur (1955) (for Lana Turner)
- I'll Cry Tomorrow (1955)
- Ransom! (1956) (for Donna Reed)
- Meet Me in Las Vegas (1956)
- Forbidden Planet (1956) (for Anne Francis)
- The Swan (1956)
- Gaby (1956)
- High Society (1956)
- These Wilder Years (1956) (for Barbara Stanwyck)
- The Power and the Prize (1956)
- Tea and Sympathy (1956) (for Deborah Kerr)
- The Opposite Sex (1956)
- Ten Thousand Bedrooms (1957)
- Something of Value (1957)
- Designing Woman (1957)
- The Seventh Sin (1957) (for Eleanor Parker)
- Silk Stockings (1957)
- Tip on a Dead Jockey (1957) (for Dorothy Malone)
- Don't Go Near the Water (1957)
- Saddle the Wind (1958) (for Julie London)
- The High Cost of Loving (1958) (for Gena Rowlands)
- The Reluctant Debutante (1958)
- Cat on a Hot Tin Roof (1958) (for Elizabeth Taylor)
- Party Girl (1958)
- The Tunnel of Love (1958) (for Doris Day and Gia Scala)
- Count Your Blessings (1959)
- The Mating Game (1959)
- Ask Any Girl (1959)
- It Started with a Kiss (1959)
- Never So Few (1959) (for Gina Lollobrigida)
- The Gazebo (1959)
- All the Fine Young Cannibals (1960)
- BUtterfield 8 (1960)
- Go Naked in the World (1961)
- The Honeymoon Machine (1961)
- Ada (1961)
- Bachelor in Paradise (1961)
- The Courtship of Eddie's Father (1963)
- Goodbye Charlie (1964)
- Made in Paris (1966)
- Mister Buddwing (1966) (for Jean Simmons)
- How Sweet It Is! (1968)

== Accolades ==
| Association | Year | Category | Title | Result | Notes | Ref. |
|---|---|---|---|---|---|---|
| Academy Awards | 1952 | Best Costume Design, Color | The Great Caruso | Nominated | Shared with Gile Steele (posthumously) | |
| Academy Awards | 1953 | Best Costume Design, Color | The Merry Widow | Nominated | Shared with Gile Steele (posthumously) | |
| Academy Awards | 1953 | Best Costume Design, Black-and-White | The Bad and the Beautiful | Won | | |
| Academy Awards | 1954 | Best Costume Design, Black-and-White | Dream Wife | Nominated | Shared with Herschel McCoy | |
| Academy Awards | 1955 | Best Costume Design, Black-and-White | Executive Suite | Nominated | | |
| Academy Awards | 1956 | Best Costume Design, Black-and-White | I'll Cry Tomorrow | Won | | |
| Academy Awards | 1956 | Best Costume Design, Color | Interrupted Melody | Nominated | | |
| Academy Awards | 1957 | Best Costume Design, Black-and-White | The Power and the Prize | Nominated | | |
| Academy Awards | 1960 | Best Costume Design, Black-and-White | The Gazebo | Nominated | | |
| Academy Awards | 1967 | Best Costume Design, Black-and-White | Mister Buddwing | Nominated | | |
| Costume Designers Guild Awards | 2002 | Hall of Fame | —N/a | Honored | | |

== Additional info ==
- 1910 United States Federal Census, Chicago, Cook County, Illinois, Enumeration District 7, Sheet 17, April 22–23, 1910.
- 1920 United States Federal Census, Chicago, Cook County, Illinois, Enumeration District 6, Sheet 10A, January 10, 1920.
- California Death Index on Ancestry.com.
