= Wilson Wood (actor) =

American actor

- Wood in The Desert Fox, 1951
- Born: Charles Woodrow Tolkien; February 11, 1915; Huron, North Dakota, U.S.
- Died: October 23, 2004 (aged 89); Culver City, California, U.S.
- Occupation: Actor
- Years active: 1946–1962
- Spouse: Martha Tolkien

Wilson Wood (born Charles Woodrow Tolkien, February 11, 1915 – October 23, 2004) was an American character actor.

Born in Huron, North Dakota on February 11, 1915, he made his film debut with a small role in 1946's Two Sisters from Boston, directed by Henry Koster. During his 17-year career he would appear in over 100 films, usually in smaller roles. In 1952 he would star in a serial for Republic Pictures. The 12 part series was titled, Zombies of the Stratosphere, which would be edited down and released in 1958 as a feature film, called Satan's Satellites. His final appearance would be in the 1962 film, Jumbo, starring Doris Day, Stephen Boyd and Jimmy Durante, in which Wood had a featured role.

Wood died on October 23, 2004, in Culver City, California, at the age of 89.

== Filmography ==
(Per AFI database)

- Faithful in My Fashion (1946)
- No Leave, No Love (1946)
- The Show-Off (1946)
- Two Sisters from Boston (1946)
- High Tide (1947) - Cleve Collins
- It Happened in Brooklyn (1947)
- The Unfinished Dance (1947)
- Big City (1948)
- Campus Honeymoon (1948)
- Easter Parade (1948)
- The Luck of the Irish (1948)
- State of the Union (1948)
- Chicken Every Sunday (1949)
- Command Decision (1949)
- The Kissing Bandit (1949)
- Adam's Rib (1949)
- One Sunday Afternoon (1949) - Courtney (uncredited)
- That Wonderful Urge (1949)
- The Barkleys of Broadway (1949) - Larry
- The Doctor and the Girl (1949)
- Scene of the Crime (1949)
- The Sun Comes Up (1949)
- That Forsyte Woman (1949)
- That Midnight Kiss (1949)
- East Side, West Side (1950)
- The Asphalt Jungle (1950)
- Dial 1119 (1950) - Television Man (uncredited)
- Duchess of Idaho (1950)
- Kim (1950) - Gerald (uncredited)
- I'll Get By (1950)
- Key to the City (1950)
- A Life of Her Own (1950)
- My Blue Heaven (1950)
- Nancy Goes to Rio (1950)
- The Next Voice You Hear... (1950)
- The Reformer and the Redhead (1950)
- The Skipper Surprised His Wife (1950)
- Stars in My Crown (1950)
- Two Weeks with Love (1950)
- The Yellow Cab Man (1950)
- Young Man with a Horn (1950)
- Watch the Birdie (1951)
- Callaway Went Thataway (1951)
- The Day the Earth Stood Still (1951)
- The Desert Fox: The Story of Rommel (1951) - Sergeant Major (uncredited)
- Force of Arms (1951)
- Insurance Investigator (1951)
- Let's Make It Legal (1951)
- Mr. Imperium (1951)
- No Questions Asked (1951) - Artist (uncredited)
- The Red Badge of Courage (1951)
- Royal Wedding (1951)
- Soldiers Three (1951)
- The Strip (1951)
- Texas Carnival (1951)
- Thunder in God's Country (1951)
- The Tall Target (1951)
- The Magnificent Yankee (1951)
- Because You're Mine (1952)
- Deadline – U.S.A. (1952)
- Everything I Have Is Yours (1952)
- Fearless Fagan (1952)
- The Girl in White (1952)
- Invitation (1952)
- Love Is Better Than Ever (1952)
- Pat and Mike (1952)
- The Pride of St. Louis (1952)
- Red Skies of Montana (1952)
- Singin' in the Rain (1952)
- Skirts Ahoy! (1952)
- Stars and Stripes Forever (1952)
- Washington Story (1952)
- Young Man with Ideas (1952)
- The Bad and the Beautiful (1952) - Man on Movie Set (uncredited)
- Easy to Love (1953) - (uncredited)
- The Clown (1953) - Wardrobe Man (uncredited)
- The Silver Whip (1953) - Telegrapher (uncredited)
- Rogue's March (1953) - Sentry (uncredited)
- I Love Melvin (1953) - Look Magazine Board of Directors (uncredited)
- The Girl Who Had Everything (1953) - Newsman (uncredited)
- The Girl Next Door (1953) - Photographer (uncredited)
- The President's Lady (1953) - Bit Role (uncredited)
- Fast Company (1953) - Photographer (uncredited)
- Pickup on South Street (1953) - Police Driver (uncredited)
- The Band Wagon (1953) - Can-Toss Booth Operator (uncredited)
- Ride, Vaquero! (1953) - Orderly (uncredited)
- Half a Hero (1953) - Co-Worker (uncredited)
- Take the High Ground! (1953) - Marine Friend (uncredited)
- Give a Girl a Break (1953) - Dog Trainer (uncredited)
- The Long, Long Trailer (1954) - Garage Owner (uncredited)
- Executive Suite (1954) - Airport Clerk (uncredited)
- Prisoner of War (1954) - Prisoner of War (uncredited)
- Black Widow (1954) - Costume Designer (uncredited)
- Athena (1954) - Attendant (uncredited)
- Hit the Deck (1955) - Singer (uncredited)
- Moonfleet (1955) - Soldier (uncredited)
- It's Always Fair Weather (1955) - Roy - TV Director (uncredited)
- Trial (1955) - Airline Boarding Checker (uncredited)
- The Tender Trap (1955) - George - Elevator Boy (uncredited)
- Tea and Sympathy (1956) - Alumnus (uncredited)
- The Opposite Sex (1956) - Stage Manager (uncredited)
- Three Brave Men (1956) - Messenger at Co-Op Meeting (uncredited)
- Designing Woman (1957) - Reporter (uncredited)
- Jailhouse Rock (1957) - Recording Engineer (uncredited)
- Don't Go Near the Water (1957) - Yeoman (uncredited)
- The High Cost of Loving (1958) - Hastings - Man in Parking Lot (uncredited)
- Satan's Satellites (1958) - Bob Wilson (archive footage)
- Some Came Running (1959) - Reporter (uncredited)
- Ask Any Girl (1959) - Detective (uncredited)
- North by Northwest (1959) - Photographer at United Nations (uncredited)
- Please Don't Eat the Daisies (1960) - Photographer (uncredited)
- Bells Are Ringing (1960) - Party Guest (uncredited)
- Cimarron (1960) - Reporter (uncredited)
- Ada (1961) - Reporter (uncredited)
- Breakfast at Tiffany's (1961) - Party Guest with Cat on Shoulder (uncredited)
- Jumbo (1962) - Hank
- It Happened at the World's Fair (1963) - Mechanic (uncredited)
