= Lou Stillman =

American boxing trainer

Louis Ingber (1887–1969), better known as Lou Stillman, was a boxing trainer who had a gym in New York City, but whose fame transcended beyond New York and into boxing circles virtually everywhere else. He was also a private detective prior to working as a boxing trainer.

In 1919, Ingber was invited by millionaires Alpheus Geer and Hiram Mallison to manage Stillman's Gym. When Ingber came along, the gym was named the Marshall Stillman Athletic Club. In the late 1920s, the gym changed its name. Patrons used to think Ingber's last name was Stillman; because of this, they greeted him as Mr. Stillman. Stillman, described as moody and acid-tonged, among other things, by boxing historians and writers, disliked having to correct everyone who called him Mr. Stillman, so eventually he changed his name legally from Louis Ingber to Lou Stillman.

Stillman was famous for keeping his gym as unsanitary as possible: He allowed the public to smoke in a closed-windows atmosphere, and he let the gym floors to go uncleaned, sometimes for years. He said: "The golden age of prizefighting was the age of bad food, bad air, bad sanitation, and no sunlight. I keep the place like this for the fighters' own good. If I clean it up they'll catch a cold from the cleanliness".

Stillman carried a gun around his waist when he was at the gym. He had two guards watching the doors, to make sure everyone paid the 25 cents price to get in and watch the boxers practice. He had a sign that read: "Anyone caught stealing will be barred for life". When French dancer Jeanne Lamar showed up at Stillman's to train in 1922, Stillman told her that there were "no facilities for girls" in his gym, but she stood around and used the gym to get in shape anyway.

Many famous people trained at Stillman's Gym, mainly boxers: Jack Dempsey, Georges Carpentier, Primo Carnera, Fred Apostoli, Joe Louis and Rocky Marciano . One who refused to train there was Gene Tunney, because he complained about the place's sanitation, saying that he would never train there unless the windows were opened. Typical of him, Stillman refused to open the windows.

Stillman retired in 1959 after selling the building, and he joined his daughter in California. He liked painting, and became proficient painter in oils as he spent the last few years of his life at a nursing home in Santa Barbara. He died on August 19, 1969.

== In popular culture ==
Stillman's Gym was featured in several motion pictures, including the Rocky Graziano biographical film Somebody Up There Likes Me (1956) and It's Always Fair Weather (1955), which has a musical number set in the gym, "Baby You Knock Me Out," featuring Cyd Charisse.
