= Looking for Love (film) =

1964 film by Don Weis

- Theatrical release poster
- Directed by: Don Weis
- Written by: Ruth Brooks Flippen
- Produced by: Joe Pasternak
- Starring: Connie Francis
- Cinematography: Milton R. Krasner
- Edited by: Adrienne Fazan
- Music by: George Stoll
- Distributed by: Metro-Goldwyn-Mayer
- Release date: August 5, 1964
- Running time: 85 minutes
- Country: United States
- Language: English

Looking for Love is a 1964 American romantic musical-comedy film starring popular singer Connie Francis.

== Plot ==
Francis plays Libby Caruso, who has spent a whole month trying to get into show business with her singing, yet hasn't succeeded. Libby then decides to retire and get a job where she can meet the right man and get married. She is interested in pursuing Paul Davis, whom she meets in the supermarket, but Paul is not interested.

Libby later creates a clothes stand she calls the "Lady Valet". This product interests Paul who wants to promote it. Paul gets Libby on The Tonight Show Starring Johnny Carson to push her products. When Libby mentions that she was formerly a singer, Carson asks her to sing. Libby's singing career takes off, and Paul then becomes interested in Libby. Libby then changes her mind and falls for a young grocer. Paul then decides to pursue Libby's roommate, Jan.

== Cast ==
- Connie Francis as Libby Caruso
- Jim Hutton as Paul Davis
- Susan Oliver as Jan McNair
- Joby Baker as Cuz Rickover
- Barbara Nichols as Gaye Swinger
- Johnny Carson as Johnny Carson
- George Hamilton as George Hamilton
- Yvette Mimieux as Yvette Mimieux
- Paula Prentiss as Paula Prentiss
- Danny Thomas as Danny Thomas
- Jay C. Flippen as Ralph Front
- Jesse White as Tiger Shay
- Charles Lane as Director
- Joan Marshall as Miss Devine

Much of the supporting cast is from Francis' first screen role, Where the Boys Are (1960). A few celebrity cameos also appear, including Johnny Carson, Danny Thomas, Paula Prentiss, George Hamilton and Yvette Mimieux. This film was Johnny Carson's first film cameo, and his movie debut.

== Reception ==
Johnny Carson used to joke that Looking for Love was so bad it was transferred to flammable nitrate film stock. In 1987, Gene Siskel and Roger Ebert appeared on The Tonight Show and brought along an alleged clip from their movie review program, in which they reviewed Carson's performance in Looking For Love. Gene slammed Johnny's acting, while Roger gave it a "thumbs up"—after which he admitted that he had been given a million dollars and other prizes for a positive review.

Filmink called the movie "terrible" and "feels as though it was written in a plotting session with people going “hey, you should put in this idea” and tried to incorporate everyone’s thoughts without bashing it into a cohesive whole. Francis tries to channel Judy Holliday and Hutton throws himself into it as always, but they’ve got nothing to work with. "

Francis was meant to make a follow-up movie, Pizza for Breakfast, but it was never filmed.

== Home media ==
Looking for Love was released to DVD by Warner Home Video on September 12, 2011 via its Warner Archive DVD-on-demand service available from online retailers.

== See also ==
- List of American films of 1964
