= Adrienne Fazan =

American film editor (1906–1986)

- Born: May 9, 1906; Germany
- Died: August 23, 1986 (aged 80); Los Angeles, California, U.S.
- Occupation: Film editor
- Years active: 1931–1970

Adrienne Fazan (May 9, 1906 – August 23, 1986) was an American film editor who first started cutting films in 1933. She worked on many MGM films, including The Tell-Tale Heart (1941), Anchors Aweigh (1945), Singin' in the Rain (1952), and Kismet (1955).

== Biography ==
Fazan was born in Germany, to John Fazan and Magdalena Fremdling. She became a naturalized U.S. citizen in 1923, and by 1930 was living in Los Angeles and working as a film editor at a studio.

== Career ==
Adrienne Fazan started cutting and editing in films in 1933 and then she went to work at MGM, who were known for hiring the most qualified and talented people.

Fazan worked with Dorothy Arzner (known for her work on many popular films like The Wild Party) on many of her films where she helped Fazan move from working on short films, to editing popular feature films. Fazan also collaborated with Vincente Minnelli on eleven films, including the Oscar winning film, Gigi.

Fazan was nominated for the Academy Award for Best Film Editing for An American in Paris (1951), and received the award for Gigi (1958). Both of these films were directed by Vincente Minnelli. She retired in 1970 after editing The Cheyenne Social Club.

== Personal life ==
Fazan was likely gay. According to actress Debbie Reynolds, "There was one woman at MGM Studios who was an editor called Adrienne, and she wore men's tailored suits and a skirt. She taught me how to cut and edit film. This was a very talented, very educated woman and she lived with another lady. Now that's going back to 1949 and the '50s and the '60s, when gay women were not out."

== Films edited ==
Editor
Year	Film	Director	Notes	Ref.
1931	Wir schalten um auf Hollywood	Frank Reicher		
1931	Parlor, Bedroom and Bath	Edward Sedgwick		
1933	Day of Reckoning	Charles Brabin		
1934	The Merry Widow	Ernst Lubitsch		
1937	The Bride Wore Red	Dorothy Arzner		
1937	You're Only Young Once	George B. Seitz		
1941	Where Did You Get That Girl?	Arthur Lubin		
1944	Barbary Coast Gent	Roy Del Ruth		
1945	Between Two Women	Willis Goldbeck	First collaboration with Willis Goldbeck	
1945	Anchors Aweigh	George Sidney	First collaboration with George Sidney	
1945	She Went to the Races	Willis Goldbeck	Second collaboration with Willis Goldbeck	
1946	Holiday in Mexico	George Sidney	Second collaboration with George Sidney	
1946	The Secret Heart	Robert Z. Leonard	First collaboration with Robert Z. Leonard	
1948	Three Daring Daughters	Fred M. Wilcox		
1948	The Kissing Bandit	László Benedek		
1949	In the Good Old Summertime	Robert Z. Leonard	Second collaboration with Robert Z. Leonard	
1950	Nancy Goes to Rio	Robert Z. Leonard	Third collaboration with Robert Z. Leonard	
1950	Duchess of Idaho	Robert Z. Leonard	Fourth collaboration with Robert Z. Leonard	
1950	Pagan Love Song	Robert Alton		
1951	An American in Paris	Vincente Minnelli	First collaboration with Vincente Minnelli	
1951	Texas Carnival	Charles Walters	First collaboration with Charles Walters	
1952	Singin' in the Rain	Gene Kelly; Stanley Donen	First collaboration with Gene Kelly; First collaboration with Stanley Donen	
1952	Everything I Have Is Yours	Robert Z. Leonard	Fifth collaboration with Robert Z. Leonard	
1953	I Love Melvin	Don Weis	First collaboration with Don Weis	
1953	Give a Girl a Break	Stanley Donen	Second collaboration with Stanley Donen	
1954	Deep in My Heart	Stanley Donen	Third collaboration with Stanley Donen	
1955	It's Always Fair Weather	Gene Kelly; Stanley Donen	Second collaboration with Gene Kelly; Fourth collaboration with Stanley Donen	
1955	Kismet	Vincente Minnelli	Second collaboration with Vincente Minnelli	
1956	Invitation to the Dance	Gene Kelly	Third collaboration with Gene Kelly	
1956	Lust for Life	Vincente Minnelli	Third collaboration with Vincente Minnelli	
1957	Designing Woman	Vincente Minnelli	Fourth collaboration with Vincente Minnelli	
1957	Don't Go Near the Water	Charles Walters	Second collaboration with Charles Walters	
1958	Gigi	Vincente Minnelli	Fifth collaboration with Vincente Minnelli	
1958	The Reluctant Debutante	Vincente Minnelli	Sixth collaboration with Vincente Minnelli	
1958	Some Came Running	Vincente Minnelli	Seventh collaboration with Vincente Minnelli	
1959	The Big Circus	Joseph M. Newman		
1959	The Gazebo	George Marshall		
1960	Bells Are Ringing	Vincente Minnelli	Eighth collaboration with Vincente Minnelli	
1962	The Four Horsemen of the Apocalypse	Vincente Minnelli	Ninth collaboration with Vincente Minnelli	
1962	Two Weeks in Another Town	Vincente Minnelli	Tenth collaboration with Vincente Minnelli	
1963	The Courtship of Eddie's Father	Vincente Minnelli	Eleventh collaboration with Vincente Minnelli	
1963	The Prize	Mark Robson		
1964	Looking for Love	Don Weis	Second collaboration with Don Weis	
1964	36 Hours	George Seaton		
1965	Billie	Don Weis	Third collaboration with Don Weis	
1966	This Property Is Condemned	Sydney Pollack		
1967	Who's Minding the Mint?	Howard Morris	First collaboration with Howard Morris	
1968	Where Angels Go, Trouble Follows	James Neilson		
1968	With Six You Get Eggroll	Howard Morris	Second collaboration with Howard Morris	
1969	The Comic	Carl Reiner		
1970	The Cheyenne Social Club	Gene Kelly	Fourth collaboration with Gene Kelly	

Short documentaries

Editor
Year	Film	Director
1939	Prophet Without Honor	Felix E. Feist
1940	Utopia of Death	—
1941	Triumph Without Drums	Joseph M. Newman
1942	Mr. Blabbermouth!	Basil Wrangell
1943	Portrait of a Genius	Sammy Lee

Shorts

Editor
Year	Film	Director
1936	Little Boy Blue	Edwin Lawrence
1939	How to Eat	Roy Rowland
1939	The Day of Rest	Basil Wrangell
1939	See Your Doctor	Basil Wrangell
1939	Miracle at Lourdes	Henry K. Dunn
1940	Know Your Money	Joseph M. Newman
1940	A Door Will Open	George Sidney
1940	The Big Premiere	Edward L. Cahn
1940	All About Hash	Edward L. Cahn
1940	Women in Hiding	Joseph M. Newman
1940	A Failure at Fifty	Will Jason
1940	Buyer Beware	Joseph M. Newman
1940	Goin' Fishin'	Edward L. Cahn
1941	Respect the Law	Joseph M. Newman
1941	More About Nostradamus	David Miller
1941	More Trifles of Importance	Basil Wrangell
1941	Coffins on Wheels	Joseph M. Newman
1941	Of Pups and Puzzles	George Sidney
1941	The Tell-Tale Heart	Jules Dassin
1941	Strange Testament	Sammy Lee
1942	The Lady, or the Tiger?	Fred Zinnemann
1942	Further Prophecies of Nostradamus	David Miller
1943	Brief Interval	Sammy Lee
1943	Inca Gold	Will Jason
1943	Inflation	Cy Endfield
1943	Journey to Yesterday	Harold Daniels
1943	Ode to Victory	Edward L. Cahn
1943	My Tomato	Will Jason
1943	No News Is Good News	Will Jason
1944	Somewhere, U.S.A.	Gordon Knox; Gunther von Fritsch
1944	A Great Day's Coming	Robert Elwyn

== See also ==
- List of film director and editor collaborations
