= Ruth Brooks Flippen =

American screenwriter (1921–1981)

- Born: Ruth Albertina Brooks; September 14, 1921; Brooklyn, New York, U.S.
- Died: July 9, 1981 (aged 59); Marina del Rey, California, U.S.
- Occupation: Screenwriter
- Spouse: Jay C. Flippen (m. 1947; died 1971)

Ruth Brooks Flippen (born Ruth Albertina Brooks; September 14, 1921 – July 9, 1981) was an American screenwriter and television writer.

The story editor for one season and later a script consultant on the popular American situation comedy series Bewitched and the story editor for three years on That Girl, she had previously written the script for the pilot of the Gidget series. In April 1969, she was signed by television producer Sherwood Schwartz to be the story editor of Paramount Television's new sitcom The Brady Bunch, which subsequently aired its first episode on the American Broadcasting Company's television network as part of its new prime time programming on Friday nights.

== Formative years and family life ==
Born Ruth Albertina Brooks on September 14, 1921 in Brooklyn, New York, Ruth Brooks was a daughter of Charles E. Brooks. Involved in the entertainment industry during her early childhood years, she became known as "Baby Ruth, the World's Most Talented Toddler Tapster." At the age of three, she relocated with her parents to Hartford, Connecticut, where she subsequently attended the Chauncey Harris Grammar School and Hartford High School. An assistant dance instructor at a prominent dance academy in Hartford by the time she was eleven, she also "had her own radio programs on WTIC and WDRC, according to local newspapers.

Employed during her high school years as a cashier at the E.M. Loew Theater in Hartford, she "worked her way through college" at Northwestern University. While there, she was a member of Alpha Chi Omega. Following her graduation, she returned to New York and began her career in the television industry.

On January 4, 1947, Ruth A. Brooks married character actor Jay C. Flippen. Their marriage lasted until her husband's death from heart disease on February 3, 1971. Previously hospitalized for gangrene of the right leg, during which time his leg was amputated, he had used a wheelchair since 1965. His recovery was covered by multiple newspapers across the United States and Canada.

== Film and television writing career ==
Following her graduation from Northwestern University and subsequent relocation to New York City, Ruth Brooks obtained a job as a staff writer with NBC. She worked on Maisie Ravier, which starred actress Ann Sothern; The Billie Burke Show, which starred former Wizard of Oz star Billie Burke; and This Is My Best.

In 1945, she relocated to Hollywood, Los Angeles, California, where she was subsequently signed by Metro-Goldwyn-Mayer. Two years later she changed her name to Ruth Brooks Flippen, following her marriage to actor Jay Flippen. Her screenwriting credits grew as she solo or co-wrote the screenplays for multiple films during the 1950s and early 1960s, including several of the Gidget films, and then moved to television where she wrote extensively for the series That Girl and other productions. She was nominated for a 1968 Emmy Award in the category "Outstanding Writing Achievement in Comedy" for the That Girl episode "The Mailman Cometh" and a 1975 Daytime Emmy Award in the category "Outstanding Writing for a Daytime Special Program" for Oh, Baby, Baby, Baby..., a 90-minute drama aired under the aegis of The ABC Afternoon Playbreak.

Politically, she supported Robert F. Kennedy during his 1968 campaign for the office of President of the United States.

Flippen was briefly head writer (in 1980) of the soap opera Days of Our Lives.

== Illness and death ==
Diagnosed with heart disease, Flippen died from related complications in Marina del Rey, California on July 9, 1981.

== Writing, editing, and consulting credits ==
=== Motion pictures ===
- Three Guys Named Mike (1951)
- Love Is Better Than Ever (1952)
- Because You're Mine (1952)
- Everything I Have Is Yours (1952)
- I Love Melvin (1953; "additional dialogue" credit)
- Gidget Goes Hawaiian (1961)
- Sail a Crooked Ship (1961)
- Gidget Goes to Rome (1963)
- A Ticklish Affair (1963)
- Looking for Love (1964)

=== Television ===
- Gidget (1965–1966; 8 episodes)
- Bewitched (1965–1971; 38 episodes)
- That Girl (1967–1969; 55 episodes)
- The Brady Bunch (1969–1970; 16 episodes)
- My World and Welcome to It (1969–1970; 2 episodes)
- The Odd Couple (1970; 1 episode)
- The Ghost & Mrs. Muir (1970; 1 episode)
- The New Scooby-Doo Movies (1972; 16 episodes)
- The ABC Saturday Superstar Movie (1972; 4 episodes)
- Oh, Baby, Baby, Baby... (1974; 90-minute drama)
- Let's Switch (1975; TV movie)
- The Love Boat (1980–1981; 2 episodes)

Preceded by Elizabeth Harrower	Head Writer of Days of Our Lives; March 17, 1980 – April 18, 1980	Succeeded by Nina Laemmle
