= George Wells (screenwriter) =

American screenwriter (1909–2000)

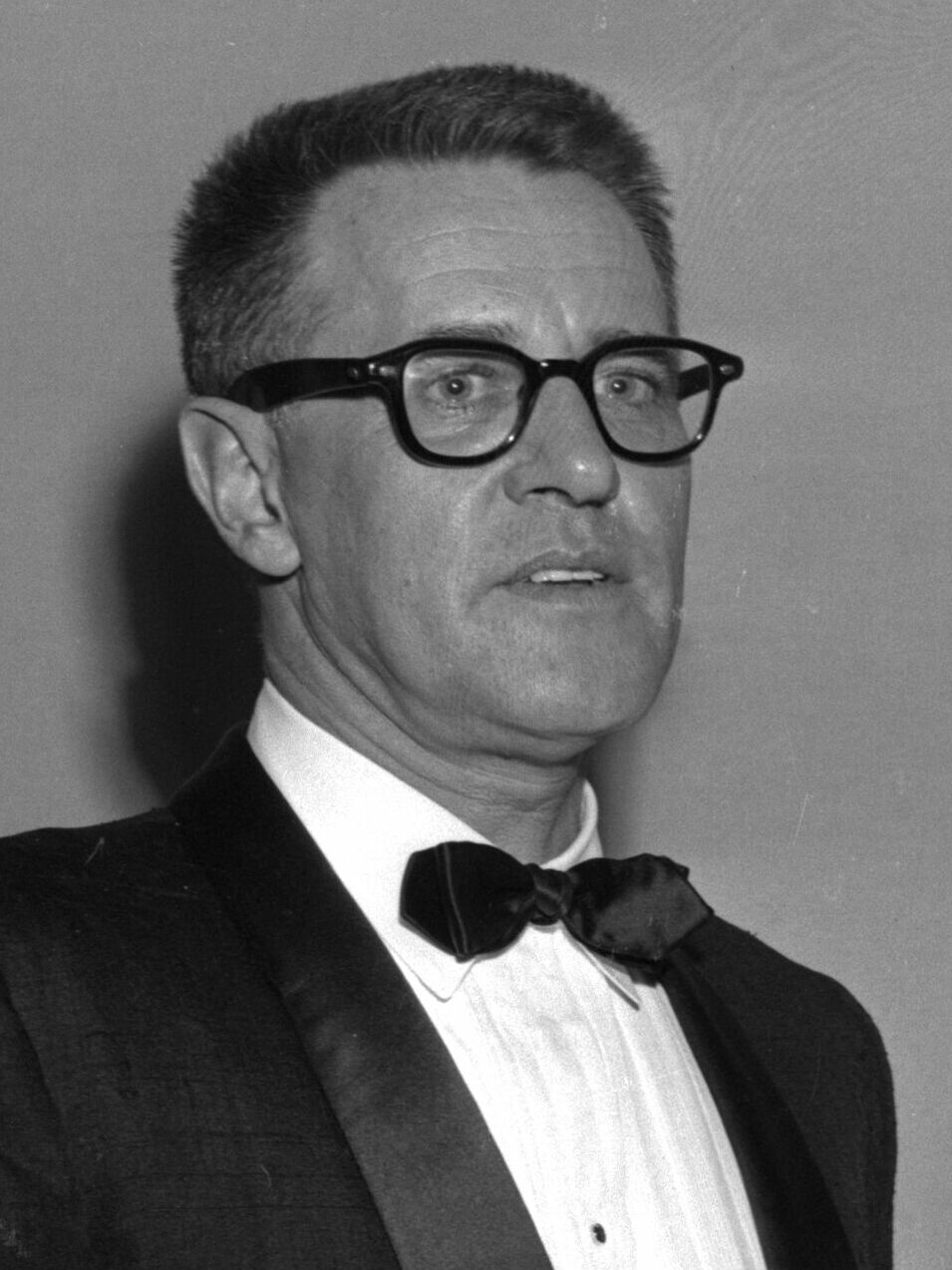
- Wells at the 30th Academy Awards in 1958
- Born: November 8, 1909; New York City, New York, U.S.
- Died: November 27, 2000 (aged 91); Newport Beach, California, U.S.
- Occupations: Writer, screenwriter
- Years active: 1946–1973

George Wells (November 8, 1909 – November 27, 2000) was an American screenwriter and producer, best known for making light comedies and musicals for MGM.

== Biography ==
Wells was the son of vaudevillian Billy K. Wells. He studied at New York University, then worked as a writer on radio on programs such as The Jack Pearl Show and Lux Radio Theatre.

Wells joined MGM as a screenwriter in 1943. He stayed there until 1970 when he retired.

His first credit was for The Show-Off (1946), a Red Skelton film. He wrote Good Old Summertime, a biopic of George Evans for Arthur Freed to star Frank Sinatra but it was not made.

He worked on the all-star musical Till the Clouds Roll By (1946) and the Clark Gable comedy The Hucksters (1947). He wrote Merton of the Movies (1947), another movie for Skelton.

Wells' work on Take Me Out to the Ball Game (1949) earned him a Writers Guild Award nomination. He did uncredited work on The Stratton Story (1949) then focused on musicals: Three Little Words (1950), The Toast of New Orleans (1950), Summer Stock (1951), Excuse My Dust (1951), Texas Carnival (1951) and Lovely to Look At (1952).

He also worked on Angels in the Outfield (1951) and It's a Big Country (1952).

=== Producer ===
Wells became a producer with Everything I Have Is Yours (1952). He also produced I Love Melvin (1953) and Dangerous When Wet (1953). In April 1954, he signed a new contract with MGM and produced Jupiter's Darling (1955). This was a big flop and Wells' next film as producer, My Intimate Friend (to star Lana Turner and Ava Gardner), was never made.

Wells went back to being a writer only.

=== Later career ===
Wells had a big hit with Don't Go Near the Water (1957). His work on Designing Woman (1957) earned him an Oscar.

Party Girl (1958) was a change of pace, a film noir. After that Wells focused on comedies: Ask Any Girl (1959), The Gazebo (1959), Where the Boys Are (1960), The Honeymoon Machine (1961), The Horizontal Lieutenant (1962), Penelope (1966), Three Bites of the Apple (1967), and The Impossible Years (1968).

He wrote an adaptation of Rip Van Winkle for George Pal in 1967 but it was never made.

He left MGM in 1970 and wrote Cover Me Babe (1970) and the TV movie The Fabulous Doctor Fable (1973).

In 1982 Wells published his sole novel, the "erotic horror" tale Taurus. Released by Signet Books, an imprint of New American Library especializing in genre paperbacks, it concerns Mexican fighting bulls who get intoxicated after eating agave roots and go on a homicidal spree across Mexico raping people to death. Horror author Grady Hendrix ascribes the story to a publishing fad following the success of James Herbert's novel The Rats (1974), which started an "escalating arms race" of sensational horror books featuring murderous animals.

He died at Newport Beach on November 27, 2000. His first wife Ruth died in 1987. He was survived by his second wife Mary, two children, and three grandchildren.

=== Awards ===
With co-writer Harry Tugend, Wells was nominated for the 1950 Writers Guild of America Award in the category of Best Written American Musical for Take Me Out to the Ball Game. They lost to Betty Comden and Adolph Green, for On the Town. He won the Academy Award for Best Original Screenplay for Designing Woman.

== Select filmography ==
=== Screenwriter ===
- The Show-Off (1946)
- Till the Clouds Roll By (1946)
- The Hucksters (1947)
- Merton of the Movies (1947)
- Take Me Out to the Ball Game (1949)
- The Stratton Story (1949) – uncredited
- Three Little Words (1950)
- The Toast of New Orleans (1950)
- Summer Stock (1950)
- Angels in the Outfield (1951)
- Excuse My Dust (1951)
- Texas Carnival (1951) – story
- It's a Big Country (1951)
- Lovely to Look At (1952)
- Everything I Have Is Yours (1952)
- I Love Melvin (1953)
- Don't Go Near the Water (1957)
- Designing Woman (1957)
- Party Girl (1958)
- Ask Any Girl (1959)
- The Gazebo (1959)
- Where the Boys Are (1960)
- The Honeymoon Machine (1961)
- The Horizontal Lieutenant (1961)
- Penelope (1966)
- Three Bites of the Apple (1967)
- The Impossible Years (1968)
- Cover Me Babe (1970)
- The Fabulous Doctor Fable (1973) (TV movie)

=== Producer ===
- Everything I Have Is Yours (1952)
- I Love Melvin (1953)
- Dangerous When Wet (1953)
- Jupiter's Darling (1955)
