= Jay C. Flippen =

American actor (1899–1971)

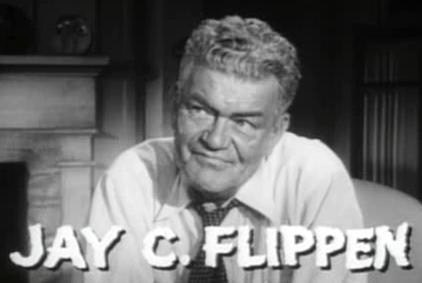
- Flippen in the trailer for Hot Summer Night, 1957
- Born: March 6, 1899; Little Rock, Arkansas, U.S.
- Died: February 3, 1971 (aged 71); Los Angeles, California, U.S.
- Resting place: Westwood Village Memorial Park Cemetery in Los Angeles
- Occupation: Actor
- Years active: 1920–1971
- Spouse: Ruth Brooks Flippen (m. 1947)

John Constantine Flippen Jr. (J.C. or Jay C.) (March 6, 1899 – February 3, 1971) was an American character actor who often played crusty sergeants, police officers or weary criminals in many 1940s and 1950s pictures, particularly in film noir. Before his motion-picture career he was a leading vaudeville comedian and master of ceremonies.

== Early days ==
John Constantine Flippen Jr. was born on March 6, 1899 in Little Rock, Arkansas, He was later known as J. C., or Jay C. He lost his father, John Constantine Flippen Sr., a bookkeeper, at age 9 and his older sister, Era, a year later. His mother, Emma Pack Flippen, earned income as a dance and theatre instructor. She produced shows in Little Rock, and Flippen often filled in when someone was unable to perform at the last minute in vaudeville shows that appeared in that city. Picking up on his mother's interest, Flippen joined the Al G. Field Minstrels at age 14. That job lasted three weeks until he was fired for sleeping too late and missing the show's parade. He began performing as a standup comedian in burlesque in 1921 and went on to vaudeville and minstrel shows, which made him a natural in obtaining roles in occasional slapstick and light musical comedy.

Flippen established himself as a respected vaudeville singer and stage actor before his film career. He was discovered by famed African-American comedian Bert Williams in 1920, and was Williams's Broadway understudy and tour replacement for the 1920 musical revue Broadway Brevities. He called himself "The Ham What Am", and his occasional blackface roles included those as Williams' replacement. Flippen attained the most coveted booking in vaudeville, headlining at the Palace Theatre in New York six times between March 1926 and February 1931.

Flippen's work on radio included being master of ceremonies on the Amateur Hour program on WHN. At one time, he was a radio announcer for New York Yankees games and was one of the first game-show announcers. Between 1924 and 1929, Flippen recorded more than 30 songs for Columbia, Perfect, and Brunswick.

In 1928, Flippen proclaimed he would no longer perform in blackface. His first film, the 1928 Vitaphone short subject The Ham What Am, captures his vaudeville act, but not in blackface: he does a comedy monologue and finishes with a song. His Southern-drawl delivery may well be the same that he had used in blackface. Flippen became popular as a master of ceremonies on vaudeville bills, and emceed movie shorts in the 1930s.

Flippen was married to Clara Michelsen Dusinberrie (28 July 1940 - ?) and then divorced. His second wife was Cathlyn Young (24 February 1922 - ?) who he also divorced. His last wife was screenwriter Ruth Brooks Flippen (4 January 1947 - 3 February 1971). They married on 4 January 1947 in Los Angeles, California and stayed together for 25 years.

When the Broadway stage revue Hellzapoppin became a success, its stars Olsen and Johnson decided to send the show on tour while they were playing it in New York. They hired Flippen to emcee the roadshow version, with comedian Happy Felton alongside him as a facsimile of Olsen and Johnson.

Flippen's film career started in earnest in 1947. Some of Flippen's most noteworthy film work came in support of James Stewart in five of the films the two made under the direction of Anthony Mann during the 1950s, particularly as a cavalry man in 1950's Winchester '73. He gave notable supporting performances in three John Wayne films: as a humorous, larcenous Marine air-crew line chief in Flying Leathernecks (1951), as Wayne's commanding general in Jet Pilot (1957) and as a wheelchair-using senior partner of Wayne's in Hellfighters (1968). He also made a fourth film that co-starred John Wayne (How the West Was Won, 1962), but played his only scene with Debbie Reynolds and Gregory Peck.

Flippen played a number of memorable roles in film noir, notably as one of the gang members in Stanley Kubrick's 1956 ensemble thriller The Killing.

Flippen's television debut came on March 11, 1954, in the episode "Come On, Red" on Ford Theatre. His other TV appearances included a 1960 guest-starring role as Gabe Jethrow in the episode "Four Came Quietly" on the CBS Western series Johnny Ringo, starring Don Durant. In 1962, he guest-starred on the ABC drama series Bus Stop, as Mike Carmody in "Verdict of 12" and Follow the Sun and as Fallon in "The Last of the Big Spenders". He also appeared on ABC's The Untouchables as Al Morrisey in "You Can't Pick the Number" (1959) and as Big Joe Holvak in "Fall Guy" (1962). In the 1962–63 season, Flippen was cast as Chief Petty Officer Homer Nelson on the NBC sitcom Ensign O'Toole, with Dean Jones in the starring role.

He guest-starred on CBS' The Dick Van Dyke Show in its first season, playing Rob Petrie's former mentor Happy Spangler. In 1964, he appeared as a loving father and title character in the episode "Owney Tupper Had A Daughter" and in CBS's Gunsmoke with James Arness (S9E27). In 1963, he guest-starred on Bonanza. He appeared four times on NBC's The Virginian in the 1960s; in 1966 he appeared on the ABC comedy Western The Rounders. In 1967 Tom Tryon and he guest-starred in the episode "Charade of Justice" of the NBC Western series The Road West. After a leg amputation in 1965, Flippen continued acting, usually using a wheelchair, such as in his comeback role in a 1966 episode of The Virginian and his 1967 guest appearance in Ironside (season one, "A Very Cool Hot Car").

== Personal life ==
While filming Cat Ballou in 1965, he had to have a leg amputated due to a serious infection, originally resulting from a minor scrape with a car door, and likely complicated by diabetes. The problem began with a sore on his leg. Home remedies failed to help, and finally he was unable to move the leg. When he went to a doctor, Flippen said, "He told me it was a mass of infection and gangrene was setting in." After a 10-week hospital stay in which he was in constant pain, his doctor told him that worsening infection meant that if the leg were not amputated he would become unable to function and might even die.

== Death ==
Flippen died February 3, 1971 at age 71, during surgery for an aneurysm of an artery.

== Selected filmography ==
- Million Dollar Ransom (1934) – Singer (uncredited)
- Marie Galante (1934) – Sailor in Bar (uncredited)
- Brute Force (1947) – Hodges
- Intrigue (1947) – Mike, the bartender
- They Live by Night (1948) – T-Dub
- A Woman's Secret (1949) – Police Insp. Jim Fowler
- Down to the Sea in Ships (1949) – Luke Sewell
- Oh, You Beautiful Doll (1949) – Lippy Brannigan
- Buccaneer's Girl (1950) – Jared Hawkins
- The Yellow Cab Man (1950) – Hugo
- Love That Brute (1950) – Biff Sage
- Winchester '73 (1950) – Sgt. Wilkes (with Jimmy Stewart)
- Two Flags West (1950) – Sgt. Terrance Duey
- The Lemon Drop Kid (1951) – Straight Flush Tony (with Bob Hope)
- The Flying Leathernecks (1951) – MSgt. Clancy (Line Chief) (with John Wayne)
- The Lady from Texas (1951) – Sheriff Mike McShane
- The People Against O'Hara (1951) – Sven Norson
- The Model and the Marriage Broker (1951) – Dan Chancellor
- Bend of the River (1952) – Jeremy Bailey (with Jimmy Stewart)
- The Las Vegas Story (1952) – Capt. H.A. Harris
- Woman of the North Country (1952) – Axel Nordlund
- Thunder Bay (1953) – Kermit MacDonald (with Jimmy Stewart)
- Devil's Canyon (1953) – Captain Jack Wells
- East of Sumatra (1953) – Mac
- The Wild One (1953) – Sheriff Stew Singer
- Carnival Story (1954) – Charley Grayson
- Six Bridges to Cross (1955) – Vincent Concannon
- The Far Country (1955) – Rube (with Jimmy Stewart)
- Man Without a Star (1955) – Strap Davis
- Strategic Air Command (1955) – Tom Doyle (with Jimmy Stewart)
- It's Always Fair Weather (1955) – Charles Z. Culloran
- Kismet (1955) – Jawan
- Oklahoma! (1955) – Skidmore
- The Killing (1956) – Marvin Unger
- 7th Cavalry (1956) – Sgt. Bates
- The King and Four Queens (1956) – Bartender (with Clark Gable)
- The Halliday Brand (1957) – Chad Burris
- Hot Summer Night (1957) – Oren Kobble
- Public Pigeon No. 1 (1957) – Lt. Ross Qualen
- The Midnight Story (1957) – Sgt. Jack Gillen
- The Restless Breed (1957) – Marshal Evans
- Run of the Arrow (1957) – Walking Coyote
- Night Passage (1957) – Ben Kimball (with Jimmy Stewart)
- The Deerslayer (1957) – Old Tom Hutter
- Jet Pilot (1957) – Major General Black (with John Wayne)
- Escape from Red Rock (1957) – Sheriff John Costaine
- From Hell to Texas (1958) – Jake Leffertfinger
- Wild River (1960) – Hamilton Garth
- Studs Lonigan (1960) – Father Gilhooey
- The Plunderers (1960) – Sheriff McCauley
- How The West Was Won (1962) – Huggins (with John Wayne) (uncredited)
- Looking for Love (1964) – Mr. Ralph Front
- The Greatest Story Ever Told (1965) – Drunken Soldier – Herod Antipas' Court (uncredited)
- Cat Ballou (1965) – Sheriff Cardigan
- The Spirit Is Willing (1967) – Mother
- Firecreek (1968) – Mr. Pittman (with Jimmy Stewart)
- Hellfighters (1968) – Jack Lomax (with John Wayne)
- The Old Man Who Cried Wolf (1970) – Pawnbroker
- The Seven Minutes (1971) – Luther Yerkes (final film role)

== Television ==
- Wanted: Dead or Alive – episode "Miracle at Pot Hole" – Chute Wilson (1958)
- Walt Disney's Wonderful World of Color – episode "The Griswold Murder" – Pop Griswold (1959)
- The Untouchables – episode "You Can't Pick the Number" – Al Morrisey (1959)
- Johnny Ringo - episode "Four Came Quietly" - Gabe Jethro (1960)
- Stagecoach West – episode "Not in Our Stars" – Aaron Sutter (1961)
- The Dick Van Dyke Show – episode "The Return of Happy Spangler" – Happy Spangler (1962)
- The Untouchables – episode "Fall Guy" – Big Joe Holvak (1962)
- Ensign O'Toole – 32 episodes – Chief Petty Officer Homer Nelson (1962-1963)
- Bonanza – episode "The Prime of Life" – Barney Fuller (1963)
- Gunsmoke – episode "Owney Tupper Had a Daughter" – Owney (1964)
- The Virginian – episode "Ride to Delphi" – Stage Depot Agent (uncredited) (1966)
- The Virginian – episode "The Wolves Up Front, the Jackals Behind" – Pa Colby (1966)
- A Man Called Shenandoah – episode "The Imposter" – Andrew O'Rourke (1966)
- Ironside – episode "A Very Cool Hot Car" – Muldoon (1967)
- The Virginian – episode "The Barren Ground" – Asa Keogh (1967)
- The Virginian – episode "Stopover" – Judge (1969)
- Rawhide – episode "Incident of the Widowed Dove" – Marshal Lindstrom (1959)
- The Name of The Game – episode "Chains of Command" – Zack Whitten (1970)
