= The Fabulous Doctor Fable =

- Genre: Crime; Drama
- Written by: George Wells
- Directed by: Bernard Girard
- Starring: W. B. Brydon; Jane Elliot; Cynthia Hall
- Country of origin: United States
- Original language: English

Production
- Producers: Robert W. Christiansen; Rick Rosenberg
- Running time: 60 min.
- Production company: Tomorrow Entertainment

Original release
- Network: ABC
- Release: June 17, 1973

The Fabulous Dr Fable is a 1973 American TV movie.
