= Gower Champion =

American actor (1919–1980)

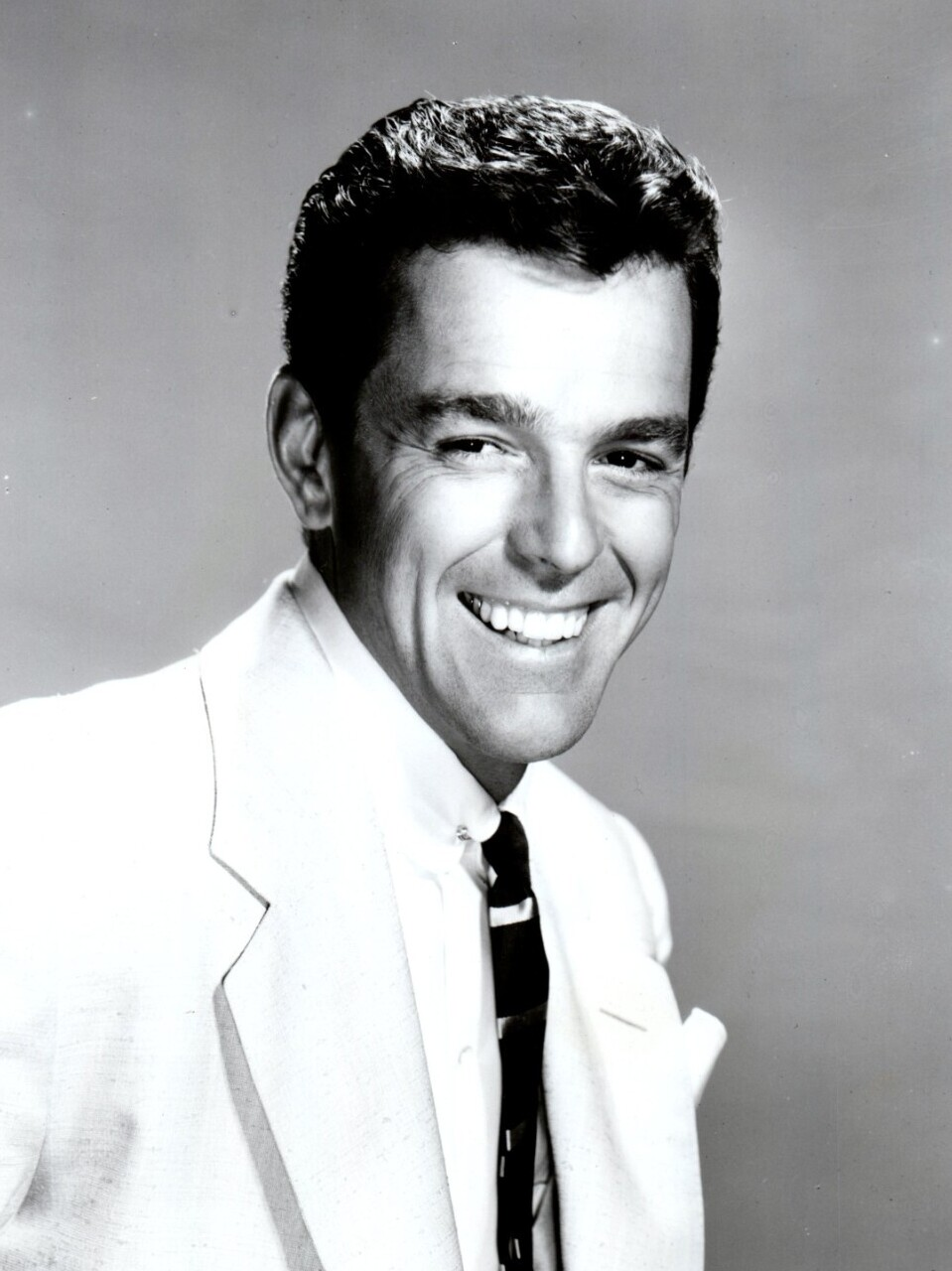
- Champion in 1962
- Born: Gower Carlyle Champion; June 22, 1919; Geneva, Illinois, US
- Died: August 25, 1980 (aged 61); New York City, NY, US
- Occupations: Actor; theatre director; choreographer; dancer
- Years active: 1939–80
- Spouses: Marjorie Belcher (m. 1947; div. 1973) Karla Russell Champion (m. 1976)
- Children: 2
- Awards: Hollywood Walk of Fame; 6162 Hollywood Boulevard

Gower Carlyle Champion (June 22, 1919 – August 25, 1980) was an American actor, theatre director, choreographer, and dancer.

== Early years ==
Champion was born on June 22, 1919, in Geneva, Illinois, as the son of John W. Champion and Beatrice Carlisle. He was raised in Los Angeles, California, where he graduated from Fairfax High School. He studied dance from an early age and, at the age of fifteen, toured nightclubs with friend Jeanne Tyler billed as "Gower and Jeanne, America's Youngest Dance Team". In 1939, "Gower and Jeanne" danced to the music of Larry Clinton and His Orchestra in a Warner Brothers & Vitaphone short-subject film, The Dipsy Doodler (released in 1940).

== Career ==
During the late 1930s and early 1940s, Champion worked on Broadway as a solo dancer and choreographer. After serving in the U.S. Coast Guard during World War II, Champion met Marjorie Belcher, who became his new partner, and the two were married in 1947.

In the early 1950s, Marge and Gower Champion made seven film musicals: Mr. Music (1950, with Bing Crosby), the 1951 remake of Show Boat (with Howard Keel and Kathryn Grayson), 1952's Lovely to Look At (a remake of Roberta, also with Keel and Grayson), the autobiographical Everything I Have Is Yours (1952), Give a Girl a Break (1953, with Debbie Reynolds and Bob Fosse), Jupiter's Darling (1955, with Keel and Esther Williams), and Three for the Show (1955, with Betty Grable and Jack Lemmon). All were made for Metro-Goldwyn-Mayer except Mr. Music (Paramount) and Three for the Show (Columbia).

Throughout the 1950s, they performed on a number of television variety shows, and in 1957 they starred in their own short-lived CBS sitcom, The Marge and Gower Champion Show, which was based on their actual career experiences.

Gower and Marge Champion appeared as the Mystery Guests on the May 15, 1955 airing of What's My Line. Mary Healy guessed who they were.

In 1948, Champion had begun to direct as well, and he won the first of eight Tony Awards for his staging of Lend an Ear, the show that introduced Carol Channing to New York City theater audiences. During the 1950s, he worked on only two Broadway musicals—choreographing Make a Wish in 1951 and directing, staging, and starring in 3 for Tonight in 1955—preferring to spend most of his time in Hollywood. However, in the 1960s, he directed a number of Broadway hits that put him at the top of his profession.

=== 1960 to 1964 ===
He had a solid success in 1960 with Bye Bye Birdie, a show about an Elvis-like rock star about to be inducted into the army. The show starred Chita Rivera and Dick Van Dyke along with a youthful cast. It ran for 607 performances and won four Tony awards, including Best Musical and two for Champion's direction and choreography. Next came Carnival! in 1961, which ran for 719 performances and garnered seven Tony nominations, including one for Champion's direction. In 1964, Champion directed one of Broadway's biggest blockbusters, Hello, Dolly!. It ran for 2,844 performances—almost seven years. Starring Carol Channing as Dolly Levi, it is perhaps best remembered for the title number, where Dolly is greeted by the staff of a restaurant after having been away for years. The show won ten Tony Awards, including Best Musical, as well as two for Champion's direction and choreography.

=== 1964 to 1980 ===
Champion had his fourth consecutive hit musical with I Do! I Do! in 1966. It featured a cast of two—veterans Mary Martin and Robert Preston—playing a couple seen throughout the years of their marriage. The show ran for 560 performances and received seven Tony nominations, including one for Champion's direction.

His next show, The Happy Time in 1968, broke his streak. It had a relatively disappointing run of only 286 performances. This would be followed by many more disappointments and worse on Broadway.

In 1969, Champion was the producer, choreographer and director of the 41st Academy Awards ceremony, which earned mostly favourable reviews.

In the 1970s, Champion directed minor hits (Sugar in 1972 and the revival Irene in 1973), flops (Mack & Mabel in 1974) and complete disasters (Rockabye Hamlet—seven performances in 1976—and A Broadway Musical, running only one night in 1978, not to mention Prettybelle, which closed out of town in 1971). On top of this, he and Marge were divorced in 1973.

After the failures of the previous decade, Champion was able to make a comeback with his longest-running show. In 1980, he choreographed and directed a stage adaptation of the movie classic 42nd Street. It won the Tony for Best Musical, and Champion was nominated for his direction and choreography, winning for the latter. The show ran for 3,486 performances, but Champion did not live to see one, having died in the morning on opening day.

== Personal life and death ==
Champion was married in 1947 to actress Marjorie Celeste Belcher, who became famous as Marge Champion. Together, they had two sons: Blake and director Gregg Champion. They divorced in January 1973. In 1976, he married Karla Russell.

He also has a star on the Hollywood Walk of Fame.

=== Death ===
In 1979, Champion was diagnosed with Waldenström's macroglobulinemia, a rare form of blood cancer, by his doctors at the Scripps Institute. He began treatment at Cedars of Lebanon Hospital in Los Angeles and was advised not to take on work. Champion died the morning of August 25, 1980, in Manhattan at Memorial Sloan-Kettering Cancer Center.

Champion's death came just hours before the opening-night performance of 42nd Street, the final Broadway musical he choreographed and directed, which ran until 1989. Producer David Merrick asked Champion's family to withhold the news from everyone, including the show's cast, until after the opening performance. During the enthusiastic curtain calls, Merrick came onstage and made the announcement to the stunned cast and audience amidst the wild applause. "This is a very tragic moment," he said. "I'm sorry to have to report that today, Gower Champion died."

== Broadway credits ==
- Count Me In (musical), performer (1942)
- Lend an Ear, musical staging (1948)
- Small Wonder (musical), choreographer (1948)
- Make a Wish, choreographer (1951)
- 3 for Tonight, director and performer (1955)
- Bye Bye Birdie, director and choreographer (1960)
- Carnival!, director and choreographer (1961)
- Hello, Dolly!, director and choreographer (1964)
- I Do! I Do!, director (1966)
- 3 Bags Full, director (1966)
- The Happy Time, director and choreographer (1968)
- A Flea in Her Ear, director (1969)
- Prettybelle, director and choreographer (1971)
- Sugar, director and choreographer (1972)
- Irene, director (1973)
- Mack & Mabel, director and choreographer (1974)
- Rockabye Hamlet, director and choreographer (1976)
- A Broadway Musical, production supervisor (1978)
- 42nd Street, director and choreographer (1980)

== Awards and nominations ==
Awards

- 1949 Tony Award for Best Choreography – Lend an Ear
- 1961 Tony Award for Best Choreography – Bye Bye Birdie
- 1961 Tony Award for Best Direction of a Musical – Bye Bye Birdie
- 1964 Tony Award for Best Choreography – Hello, Dolly!
- 1964 Tony Award for Best Direction of a Musical – Hello, Dolly!
- 1968 Tony Award for Best Choreography – The Happy Time
- 1968 Tony Award for Best Direction of a Musical – The Happy Time
- 1981 Drama Desk Award for Outstanding Choreography – 42nd Street
- 1981 Tony Award for Best Choreography – 42nd Street (posthumous award)

Nominations

- 1962 Tony Award for Best Direction of a Musical – Carnival!
- 1967 Tony Award for Best Direction of a Musical – I Do! I Do!
- 1973 Tony Award for Best Choreography – Sugar
- 1973 Tony Award for Best Direction of a Musical – Sugar
- 1975 Tony Award for Best Choreography – Mack & Mabel
- 1975 Tony Award for Best Direction of a Musical – Mack & Mabel
- 1981 Tony Award for Best Direction of a Musical – 42nd Street (posthumous nomination)
