= Jupiter's Darling =

1955 film by George Sidney

- Film poster
- Directed by: George Sidney
- Screenplay by: Dorothy Kingsley
- Based on: The Road to Rome; 1928 play by Robert E. Sherwood
- Produced by: George Wells
- Starring: Esther Williams; Howard Keel; Marge Champion; Gower Champion; George Sanders; Richard Haydn
- Cinematography: Charles Rosher; Paul C. Vogel
- Edited by: Ralph E. Winters
- Music by: Score: David Rose; Songs: Burton Lane (music); Saul Chaplin (music); Harold Adamson (lyrics); Saul Chaplin (lyrics); George Wells (lyrics)
- Production company: Metro-Goldwyn-Mayer
- Distributed by: Loew's, Inc.
- Release date: February 18, 1955
- Running time: 95 minutes
- Country: United States
- Language: English
- Budget: $3,337,000
- Box office: $2,520,000

Jupiter's Darling is a 1955 American Eastman Color musical romance film released by MGM and directed by George Sidney filmed in CinemaScope. It starred Esther Williams as the Roman (by way of Greece) woman Amytis, Howard Keel as Hannibal, the Carthaginian military commander, and George Sanders as Fabius Maximus, Amytis's fiancé.

The film features many historical characters, including Roman generals Fabius Maximus and Scipio Africanus who appears briefly, in addition to Hannibal. Carthaginians Mago Barca and Maharbal also appear.

Jupiter's Darling was based on Robert E. Sherwood's anti-war comedy play The Road to Rome (1927).

The film was the last of three films Williams and Keel made together, the other two being Pagan Love Song (1950) and Texas Carnival (1951). He later said he felt it was the best picture they made together. The movie was a huge financial flop and the last movie Williams made at MGM.

== Plot ==
Horatio the Historian sings to beautiful women about the day that Fabius Maximus was crowned the dictator of Rome. Fabius gives a speech about stopping Hannibal’s invasion and looks for his bride-to-be, Amytis, but she is not there. She and her personal slave, Meta, visit Rome’s market and witness a slave auction where Varius, one of Hannibal’s soldiers, is being sold. Since Meta seems captivated by Varius, Amytis engages in a bidding war and wins him.

Varius and Meta dance and sing in a musical number, “If This Be Slavery,” and Fabius and his mother, Fabia, witness the chaotic aftermath. Both scold Amytis, but she dismisses them. It is revealed Fabius and Amytis have been engaged for seven years. Fabius tells her that they’ll be married in a week, or she’ll become a priestess of Vesta. Left alone, Amytis swims in a luxurious private pool, synchronized swimming with living marble statues of Roman gods and heroes, while singing “I Have a Dream” about finding a better man to fall in love with.

Roman General Scipio interrupts their wedding announcement party to proclaim twelve Roman legions were annihilated by Hannibal, who is twenty miles outside of Rome with war elephants. On the road, Hannibal and his vast army sing “Hannibal” in support of their leader and his goal of defeating Rome. Curious, Amytis and Meta seek out Hannibal but are caught by his soldiers. Horatio the Historian is recording Hannibal’s every movement and word. Amytis convinces Hannibal to have a private discussion, but he still orders her execution. Cleverly, Amytis points out Hannibal’s maps are wrong and, although Hannibal sings “I Never Trust a Woman,” even proclaiming he’d rather trust his pet leopard than a woman, he still goes with her to spy on Rome.

When Amytis directs Hannibal to cross the Tiber River to take a closer look at Rome's fortifications, Hannibal admits he can’t swim. While she teases Hannibal, the two float across with Amytis leading him by the chin. However, it turns out there is a bridge, and Hannibal, in irritation, has them go back for his armor and the chariot. The pair are filled with romantic tension; Hannibal sings to Amytis “Don’t Let This Night Get Away” about how they should be together tonight. Just as they are about to kiss, Romans discover their chariot, and Hannibal fights and kills several Roman soldiers before taking Amytis captive again and riding back to camp. Furious, Hannibal demands Amytis’ execution, thinking she betrayed him, but Amytis declares she only came to his camp to see him, the man she’s been dreaming of. Even though Hannibal promises to kill her tomorrow and Amytis says she understands, they kiss passionately instead.

During a reprise of “Hannibal,” his armies approach Hannibal’s tent to start the invasion of Rome, but instead find him infatuated with Amytis. When the armies ready for a later attack at high noon, Hannibal dismisses this men again, rescheduling for dusk. Bored and frustrated, Horatio the Historian records that Hannibal is “reconnoitering,” while Hannibal and Amytis leisurely enjoy his treasures. When Varius suddenly reappears and returns to his original position as Hannibal’s elephant keeper, he explains there are only two Roman legions left to defend the city. Amytis pushes Meta to stop Varius from telling more. As Meta grows offended by Varius talking about owning her as a slave, the pair sing a song about training while the performing synchronized choreography with Hannibal’s war elephants, including a baby elephant. Although Amytis also admires Hannibal’s elephants, she suggests they be brighter in color.

When Fabius arrives in a negotiation delegation to Hannibal’s camp, he gives his medallion with Amytis’ image inside, leading Hannibal to discover Amytis’ identity, much to his fury. Intent on Meta being his wife in Carthage, Varius frees her, but Meta refuses to leave Amytis, so she knocks out Varius, allowing both women to escape. When chased to a cliff, Amytis rides her horse off the edge and into the water. Three of Hannibal’s soldiers dive in after her, following her into a sunken boat and further into watery depths. She escapes them and safely arrives in Rome, joining Fabius but instead deciding to become a Vestal priestess rather than marry him.

Hannibal lays siege to Rome, and the two armies engage in combat, including the war elephants equipped with a battering ram to break the gates. To avoid slaughter, Fabius surrenders, but Amytis petulantly urges him to keep fighting. When Fabius offers tribute, Hannibal asks only for Amytis. She graciously accepts, pretending to sacrifice herself, as she prefers to join Hannibal rather than to stay in Rome. Initially Hannibal rejects her to tease Amytis, but he quickly relents, bringing her with him. As they leave Rome together to return to Carthage, Hannibal reveals he has painted all of the elephants vibrant colors for Amytis.

== Cast ==
- Esther Williams as Amytis
- Howard Keel as Hannibal
- Marge Champion as Meta
- Gower Champion as Varius
- George Sanders as Fabius Maximus
- Richard Haydn as Horatio
- William Demarest as Mago
- Norma Varden as Fabia
- Douglass Dumbrille as Scipio
- Henry Corden as Carthalo
- Michael Ansara as Maharbal
- Martha Wentworth as Widow Titus
- John Olszewski as Principal Swimming Statue

== Production ==
The film was based on a 1927 play Road to Rome. It was bought by MGM in April 1933 who announced they would make a movie from the play, potentially as a star vehicle for Clark Gable. In June the studio listed the project among their upcoming productions. Rights appear to have lapsed because in April 1939 MGM announced they had purchased the property again as a vehicle for Gable and Myrna Loy with Joseph L. Mankiewicz to produce. In May 1940 MGM announced the film would star Loy.

In January 1950 MGM announced that Charles Schnee had just completed a script for Clarence Brown to direct and that they hoped Kirk Douglas to star. However no film resulted.

In January 1954 MGM announced they would turn the play into a musical called Jupiter's Darling starring Esther Williams and Howard Keel. MGM said because of this casting, Jane Powell was to go into Athena which had been intended for Williams, Ava Gardner would replace Powell in Love Me or Leave Me, and Lana Turner would replace Gardner in My Most Intimate Friend.

In her memoir, Williams said she had been on maternity leave for three months, being pregnant with daughter Susan, and had assumed that she would go straight to work on the film Athena. She, along with writers Leo Pogostin and Chuck Walters, created the premise for Athena during the filming of Easy to Love, and Walters finished the script while Williams was on leave. However, Athena had already gone into production when Williams returned, and the studio had changed the swimming sequences to dancing sequences and replaced Williams with Jane Powell. Williams was then assigned Jupiter's Darling.

Howard Keel later said the studio decided to change the title from Road to Rome so audiences did not think it was a "Road" picture. He suggested Hannibal's Darling which led to the title of Jupiter's Darling.

In February 1954 George Sanders was announced as co-star; it was said he agreed to do it because he had the chance to sing. Keel said that Sanders' singing numbers were cut out of the final film.

Marge and Gower Champion joined the cast; Howard Keel signed a new long-term contract with MGM in April. Williams said director George Sidney delayed filming by three months so the Champions could be in it (they were still shooting Three for the Show at Columbia), but she then said the real reason was Sidney was having marital difficulties with his wife Lillian Burns and did not want to go home. Williams said this led to Sidney insisting on long shoot days and rehearsals.

=== Shooting ===
During filming, Williams ruptured her left eardrum, which had already been ruptured in five other films. She was fitted with a prosthesis made from latex that covered her nose and ears, preventing water from rushing in. As a result, she could barely hear, taste, or smell while wearing it, and her diving had to be limited. Stuntwoman Ginger Stanley was Williams' body double in some of the underwater scenes.

In one scene where she is fleeing from Hannibal and his soldiers, Amytis rides her horse over the edge of a cliff on the Tiber River. Williams refused to do the stunt, and when the studio refused to cut it, the director called in a platform diver whom Williams knew, Al Lewin. The stunt was performed only once; the studio got its shot; and Lewin broke his back.

Filming of a sequence on Catalina Island took place in February 1954. There was also filming in Silver Springs, Florida.

The number involving painted elephants was hugely expensive.

Jupiter's Darling was the only Esther Williams musical at MGM to lose money. Dorothy Kingsley, who wrote the script, later said she wanted to do a musical version of Road to Rome:

It was a satire and, in fact, we even had Hannibal's elephants painted pastel colors —- orange and green. Dore Schary [head of MGM] was always against it, I must say. He was worried about doing satire and I have to agree with him: there were some wonderful visual things in it, even an elephant dance, but the satire didn't work. We took it out to a preview and I was sitting behind people in the front rows who took it seriously. It wasn't until halfway through the picture that someone in front said, "Oh, it's a satire." That's the only flop I had, I think.

Editor Ralph Winters called the movie "a real dog. I was stuck on this turkey for six months, but the people who made the picture really were darling."

== Release ==
The film's world premiere was held in Milwaukee. The cast, including a 350-pound baby elephant named Jupiter's Darling, embarked on a tour of nine U.S. cities.

=== Critical reception ===
A 1955 New York Times review of the film claimed that "Esther Williams must be getting bored with water. She goes swimming only three times in M-G-M's "Jupiter's Darling", which came yesterday to the Music Hall, and two of these times are forced upon her. She dunks only once for fun. And that, we might note, is the most attractive and buoyant thing in the film. It comes when Miss Williams, cast rashly as the fiancée of Emperor Fabius Maximus of Rome, peels off her stola and tunic after a long hot day in town and goes swimming in the pool of her villa, which is fancier than any pool in Hollywood." It also stated that "Miss Williams had better get back in that water and start blowing bubbles again."

Variety called it "fairly entertaining though a hit and miss affair."

Keel said he felt his performance as Hannibal was his best at MGM.

=== Box office ===
Box office reception was poor – according to MGM records, it made $1,493,000 in the US and Canada and $1,027,000 elsewhere resulting in a loss of $2,232,000.

Williams was meant to follow the movie with Say It in French, but the film was never made.

== See also ==
- List of American films of 1955
- List of films set in ancient Rome
