= The Gazebo =

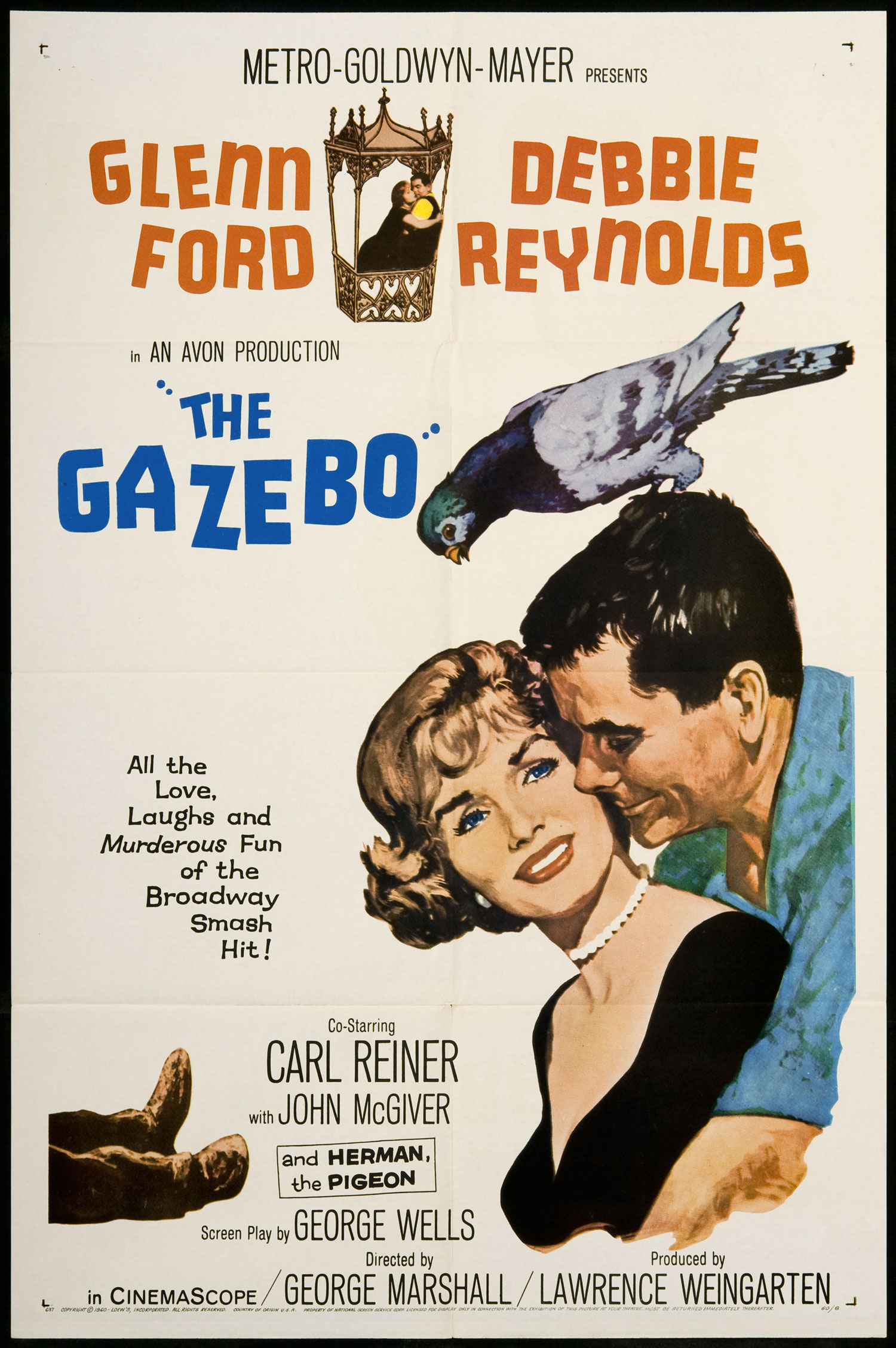
- Directed by: George Marshall
- Screenplay by: George Wells
- Story by: Myra Coppel; Alec Coppel
- Based on: The Gazebo; 1958 play by Alec Coppel; Frederick Brisson
- Produced by: Lawrence Weingarten
- Starring: Glenn Ford; Debbie Reynolds; Carl Reiner; John McGiver
- Cinematography: Paul C. Vogel
- Edited by: Adrienne Fazan
- Music by: Jeff Alexander
- Distributed by: Metro-Goldwyn-Mayer
- Release dates: December 16, 1959 (U.S.); July 24, 1960 (UK)
- Running time: 100 minutes
- Country: United States
- Language: English
- Budget: $1,218,000
- Box office: $3.31 million

The Gazebo is a 1959 American black comedy CinemaScope film about a married couple who are being blackmailed. It was based on the 1958 play of the same name by Alec Coppel and directed by George Marshall. Helen Rose was nominated for the Academy Award for Best Costume Design, Black-and-White. It is also the last film released by MGM in the 1950s.

== Plot ==
Television mystery writer and director Elliott Nash is blackmailed by Dan Shelby over nude photographs of his wife Nell, taken when she was 18 years old. Elliott does not inform Nell, the star of a Broadway musical, but works feverishly to pay off the increasing demands.

Finally, Elliott decides that murder is the only way out. He obtains advice from his friend, District Attorney Harlow Edison, who thinks he is helping with a mystery plot. When a figure presumed to be the blackmailer shows up at the Nashes' suburban home to collect his latest payment, Elliott shoots him, wraps the body in bathroom shower curtains, then hides it in the concrete foundation being poured for the antique gazebo his wife has bought. He struggles to keep Sam Thorpe, the contractor hired to install the structure, and Miss Chandler, the real estate agent trying to sell the Nashes' house, from stumbling across his scheme.

Edison brings news that Shelby has been shot dead in his hotel room, leaving Elliott wondering whom he murdered. Nell's name is on a list of blackmail victims belonging to Shelby, so she and Elliott are both suspects. Shelby had approached Nell also, but she felt that if the photos were published, the publicity would be good for her. The Nashes are cleared when the murder weapon is found to belong to Joe the Black, an associate of Shelby's who collected payments. Police Lieutenant Jenkins realizes that Joe decided to steal all the money. Elliott is relieved to discover his victim was another criminal. However, two others were in the gang: the Duke and Louis the Louse, who kidnap Nell and take her to her home to find Joe the Black, who had $100,000 in a briefcase. They eventually figure out that the body is in the gazebo's foundation, now crumbling due to unexpected rain. They bring the body, wrapped in the shower curtains, into the Nash living room, and leave with the briefcase. When Elliott gets home, he unties his wife and confesses what he has done, moving the body to another room.

Soon, Lieutenant Jenkins shows up, having arrested the Duke and Louis. From what they have told him, Jenkins is sure that Elliott murdered Joe. Just as Elliott is about to confess, he sees that the bullet he fired missed Joe and ended up lodged in a book. A doctor confirms that Joe actually died of a pre-existing heart problem, and Elliott's pet pigeon Herman, whom he had been nursing back to health after an injury, flies off with the bullet, so no evidence ties him to the death. As the police leave, Herman drops the bullet on Jenkins' hat, which he discards in disgust, thinking he was hit by pigeon guano.

== Cast ==
- Glenn Ford as Elliott Nash
- Debbie Reynolds as Nell Nash
- Carl Reiner as Harlow Edison
- John McGiver as Sam Thorpe
- Mabel Albertson as Miss Chandler
- Doro Merande as Matilda, the Nashes' servant
- Bert Freed as Lieutenant Joe Jenkins
- Martin Landau as The Duke
- Robert Ellenstein as Ben
- Dick Wessel as Louis the Louse (as Richard Wessel)
- James Gavin as Sgt. Drucker (uncredited)
- Stanley Adams as Dan Shelby, the blackmailer (uncredited)
- Harlan Warde as Dr Bradley (uncredited)
- ZaSu Pitts as Mrs MacGruder (scenes deleted)
- James Kirkwood Sr. as Mr MacGruder (scenes deleted)

== Production ==
Film rights to the play were bought for $250,000.

A comic subplot involves Alfred Hitchcock inadvertently assisting Elliott in a murder plan via telephone, while checking on a script Nash is writing for him. The play's author Alec Coppel had written such a script for Hitchcock's film Vertigo.

== Reception ==
=== Critical ===
The Chicago Tribune was generally positive: "Glenn Ford is both entertaining and convincing as a timid soul whose nerves are none too good at best....It is a fairly loosely constructed item and stretched a bit thin but, thanks to Mr. Ford's superior abilities, it's moderately good fun."

The New York Times had few compliments: "This Hollywood reconstruction of 'The Gazebo,' which first showed as a play on Broadway, is notably tall as a story. It does not command a very extended view. Indeed, the extent of its prospect is not much further than the end of the nose of Glenn Ford, who plays a badly confused and short-sighted perpetrator of a somewhat grisly crime. As a man who is standing off a blackmailer (the reason is too absurd), he decides to get rid of his tormentor by inviting him into his home and murdering him. And since this becomes the significant, if not the only, comic incident in the film, the range of its humorous contemplation is pretty well limited to Mr. Ford in this scene....For the rest [of the film], it is a run of flightly nonsense about Mr. Ford's trying to conceal the fact that he has buried the corpse in the concrete foundation of a new gazebo at his place in Connecticut. And when this not so clever or funny detail is finally exposed, it is a matter of fetching about for a gimmick to show he didn't murder the fellow after all....With lively and cheerful Debbie Reynolds to adorn the prospect from time to time as his anxious wife, you would think he could step about smartly, if he had any smartness at all. But we're afraid Mr. Ford hasn't got it. He is not a comedian. John McGiver helps things along a wee bit...and Doro Merande's brazen screeches serve the purpose of piercing the lethargy occasionally. But the rest of the cast is average, George Marshall's direction is flat and the black-and-white CinemaScope production is right off the warehouse racks.

The Philadelphia Inquirer praised the film as "A whooped-up, spiced-up screen version of Alec Coppel's murder comedy....Scampering through the engaging nonsense under George Marshall's lively direction Ford has a field day as a frantic TV writer and director of whodunits who finds himself all thumbs when it comes to murder on his own Connecticut premises....George Wells' script embroiders brightly over the original play, providing fresh invention and...ample scope for sight gags, slapstick and amiable additions—including that extremely helpful pigeon....'The Gazebo' offers both Ford and Miss Reynolds lively scope for their comic talents....Sturdy support is offered by...McGiver...Carl Reiner...Dora Merande...Others lending assistance in this cheerful Avon production are Mabel Albertson, Bert Freed, Martin Landau and Richard Wessel."

=== Box office ===
According to MGM financial records, the film earned $1,860,000 in North America and $1,450,000 elsewhere, making a profit of $628,000.

== See also ==
- List of American films of 1959
- Jo, a 1971 French adaptation of the same play
