= Everything I Have Is Yours (film) =

1952 musical by Robert Zigler Leonard

- Directed by: Robert Z. Leonard
- Written by: George Wells; Ruth Brooks Flippen
- Produced by: George Wells
- Starring: Marge Champion; Gower Champion; Dennis O'Keefe
- Cinematography: William V. Skall
- Edited by: Adrienne Fazan
- Music by: David Rose
- Production company: Metro-Goldwyn-Mayer
- Distributed by: Metro-Goldwyn-Mayer
- Release dates: October 29, 1952 (New York); October 31, 1951 (Los Angeles)
- Running time: 92 minutes
- Country: United States
- Language: English
- Budget: $1,461,000
- Box office: $1,946,000

Everything I Have Is Yours is a 1952 American Technicolor musical film directed by Robert Z. Leonard and starring Marge Champion, Gower Champion and Dennis O'Keefe. The film marks the first starring roles for the Champions and writer George Wells' debut as a producer.

== Plot ==
Happily married dance team Chuck and Pamela Hubbard have dreamed for years about taking their act to Broadway. After much hard work and perseverance, they are finally afforded a chance to fulfill their dream, but Pamela is pregnant and her doctor forbids her to dance.

== Cast ==
- Marge Champion as Pamela Hubbard
- Gower Champion as Chuck Hubbard
- Dennis O'Keefe as Alec Tacksbury
- Monica Lewis as Sybil Meriden
- Dean Miller as Monty Dunstan
- Eduard Franz as Phil Meisner
- John Gallaudet as Ed Holly
- Diane Cassidy as Showgirl
- Elaine Stewart as Showgirl
- Jonathan Cott as Freddie
- Robert Burton as Doctor Charles
- Jean Fenwick as Mrs. Tirson
- Mimi Gibson as Pamela (age 3)
- William Kerwin as Larry
- Wilson Wood as Roy Tirson

== Reception ==
In a contemporary review for The New York Times, critic Bosley Crowther called the film an "extravagant romance" and wrote:

As pleasant a couple of hoofers as Marge and Gower Champion are—and there isn't the slightest question that they make a spirited and versatile dancing team—they are scarcely the actors to carry a whole picture of their own. ... [W]hen they are stuck with the necessity of making something of the thoroughly foolish tale of a dancing couple whose domestic life is not too easy, which George Wells has provided for them, the young people show their shortcomings. They are not only mannered in their ways but a certain peculiar pomposity—a sort of snootiness—is evident in Gower. ... [T]he dancing Champions do not look to be likely acting stars. Everything they have is in their four feet, and they'd be wise to stick exclusively to them.

Critic Philip K. Scheuer of the Los Angeles Times wrote:

"Everything I Have Is Yours" is ours now, and we're the happier for it. Cause of all this unwonted gaiety is the arrival of the warmest, most infectious dancing pair since Fred Astaire swept Ginger Rogers into their first waltz—Marge and Gower Champion. ... What the Champions have is something rarer even than technical proficiency or ''personality''—and that is the quality of refinement. Or it may be, and probably is, that the skill and the personalities are simply natural outward expressions of their innate gentility. One feels they couldn't go wrong if they tried.

According to MGM records, the film earned $1,359,000 in the U.S. and Canada and $587,000 elsewhere, resulting in a loss of $459,000.
