= Designing Woman =

1957 film by Vincente Minnelli

- Theatrical release poster
- Directed by: Vincente Minnelli
- Written by: George Wells
- Based on: a suggestion by Helen Rose
- Produced by: Dore Schary
- Starring: Gregory Peck; Lauren Bacall; Dolores Gray
- Cinematography: John Alton
- Edited by: Adrienne Fazan
- Music by: Billy Higgins; André Previn; W. Benton Overstreet
- Distributed by: Metro-Goldwyn-Mayer
- Release date: May 16, 1957
- Running time: 118 minutes
- Country: United States
- Language: English
- Budget: $1.8 million
- Box office: $3.7 million

Designing Woman is a 1957 American Metrocolor romantic comedy film, in CinemaScope, about two young, whirlwind-romanced newlywed professionals and their misadventures in adjusting to each other's lifestyles. Vincente Minnelli directed the film, which stars Gregory Peck, Lauren Bacall, and Dolores Gray, and features Sam Levene and Chuck Connors. The film earned George Wells an Academy Award for Best Original Screenplay.

== Plot ==
In Beverly Hills, California, covering a golf tournament, New York sports reporter Mike Hagen correctly chooses the winning golfer in the reporters' betting pool. With the $1,200 he won, Mike begins buying drinks. The next morning he awakes with no memory of the night before. Hung over and believing that he failed to file his story, Mike sits beside the hotel pool drinking coffee when an unfamiliar woman, Marilla Brown, approaches him. Mike, through a series of misunderstandings, assumes she is a prostitute.

As Marilla heatedly begins to correct him, he receives a call from his editor telling him he had received Mike's story, but that a corrupt boxing promoter was threatening Mike. Ending the call, Mike returns to Marilla who explains that she had helped him write his story. This begins a whirlwind eight-day romance which ends with marriage. Only on the flight back to New York does Mike begin to discover that Marilla had hidden the details of her job, wealth and family connections in order to land Mike. This quickly causes friction.

Mike is a sportswriter and poker enthusiast with working-class friends. Marilla designs clothes for a wide array of artistic personalities. Their friends clash memorably one Wednesday night when his Poker Club and her Drama Society both convene at Marilla's apartment.

Marilla becomes suspicious of Mike after she finds a photograph of Lori Shannon, Mike's former girlfriend. Mike tries to hide his former relationship, but fails miserably. Complicating matters even further is Mike's continuing series of exposés of the activities of crooked boxing promoter Martin Daylor. Mike's life is in danger, but he hides that from his wife as well. What results is a series of misunderstandings and mishaps.

== Cast ==
- Gregory Peck as Mike Hagen
- Lauren Bacall as Marilla Brown Hagen
- Dolores Gray as Lori Shannon
- Sam Levene as Ned Hammerstein, Mike's editor
- Tom Helmore as Zachary Wilde, Marilla's former boyfriend
- Mickey Shaughnessy as Maxie Stultz, a punch-drunk ex-boxer friend of Hagen
- Jesse White as Charlie Arneg
- Chuck Connors as "Johnny O", one of Daylor's henchmen
- Edward Platt as Martin J. Daylor
- Alvy Moore as Luke Coslow
- Carol Veazie as Gwen
- Jack Cole as Randy Owens
- Richard Deacon as Larry Musso (uncredited)
- Dean Jones as assistant stage manager in Boston (uncredited)
- Sid Melton as Miltie, henchman (uncredited)

== Background ==
The original concept for the film reportedly came from Helen Rose, who designed dozens of gowns and dresses for Bacall for Designing Woman. She gives an interview/screen test in the DVD's special features. Lauren Bacall was dealing with husband Humphrey Bogart's terminal illness during the shooting. According to her autobiography, she took the role (which was originally intended for Grace Kelly) to avoid her home situation, but in interviews she said that this film was among her favorites, and that she desperately wanted the part, even accepting a lower salary. She said that Kelly considered the part to have been written for her, and would never forgive Bacall, who added, "She got the prince, I got the part." Bogart died January 14, 1957, four months before the film's release. James Stewart and Cary Grant turned down the role that went to Peck, with Grant citing the heavy drinking of the character as the main reason for his refusal.

== Box office ==
According to MGM records, the film earned $2,175,000 in the US and Canada and $1,575,000 elsewhere, resulting in a loss of $136,000.

== Reception ==
Designing Woman ended up being one of both Bacall and Peck's more successful films both critically and commercially, with Bosley Crowther of The New York Times comparing the leading couple with Katharine Hepburn and Spencer Tracy and stating, "[the film] obviously endeavors to generate the same kind of verve and general sardonic humor as flowed from that older comedy team. It does, too — at least, in certain stretches."

As for modern reviews, Rotten Tomatoes has given Designing Woman an overall positive note, regarding it 82 percent "fresh" as opposed to "rotten". Bruce Elder of Allmovie.com gives it two and a half stars out of five, crediting Bacall for giving a "sparkling comic performance." "With the very slight plot one can only deduce...that the 'real' point of Designing Woman was the issue of masculinity. This, in turn, may explain why Designing Woman remains an amazingly obscure film, given its two high-profile stars and director--it's 'about' issues and ideas that aren't easy to discuss or delineate, and is far more challenging and sophisticated than its plot description would indicate."

DVDverdict.com proclaims the comedy as "shiny, polished, and entertaining" and states that "it has held its value well over the years."

== Awards and nominations ==
Award	Category	Nominee(s)	Result
Academy Awards	Best Story and Screenplay – Written Directly for the Screen	George Wells	Won
Laurel Awards	Top Comedy		5th Place
Laurel Awards	Top Female Comedy Performance	Lauren Bacall	3rd Place
Writers Guild of America Awards	Best Written American Comedy	George Wells	Nominated

== See also ==
- List of American films of 1957
