= It's Always Fair Weather =

1955 film by Gene Kelly and Stanley Donen

- Theatrical release poster
- Directed by: Gene Kelly; Stanley Donen
- Written by: Betty Comden; Adolph Green
- Produced by: Arthur Freed
- Starring: Gene Kelly; Dan Dailey; Cyd Charisse; Dolores Gray; Michael Kidd
- Cinematography: Robert Bronner
- Edited by: Adrienne Fazan
- Music by: André Previn
- Distributed by: Metro-Goldwyn-Mayer
- Release date: September 2, 1955
- Running time: 102 minutes
- Country: United States
- Language: English
- Budget: $2,771,000
- Box office: $2,374,000

It's Always Fair Weather is a 1955 American musical romantic comedy film directed by Gene Kelly and Stanley Donen. The film was scripted by Betty Comden and Adolph Green, who also wrote the show's lyrics, with music by André Previn. It stars Kelly, Dan Dailey, Cyd Charisse, Dolores Gray, and dancer/choreographer Michael Kidd in his first film acting role.

The film, co-directed by Kelly and Donen, was shot in CinemaScope and Eastmancolor. Although well-received critically at the time, it was not a commercial success and is one of the last major dance-oriented MGM musicals. In recent years, it has been recognized as a seminal film because of the inventiveness of its dance routines.

It's Always Fair Weather is noted for its downbeat theme, unusual for a musical, which may have hurt it at the box office, and has been called a rare "cynical musical".

== Plot ==
Three ex-G.I.s, Ted Riley (Kelly), Doug Hallerton (Dailey), and Angie Valentine (Kidd), have served in World War II together and become best friends. In October 1945, they meet at their favorite New York City bar, Tim's Bar & Grill, before their release from the service. When Ted receives a Dear John letter from his girlfriend telling him she has married another man, his friends comfort him and join him in hitting every other bar in town. They dance drunkenly through the street ("The Binge") before returning to Tim's. Barman Tim is dubious about their vows of eternal friendship—having heard similar claims made by many other discharged servicemen—and wagers them that they will forget about each other. The trio protest, insisting that they will be different and promise to reunite exactly ten years later in the same spot, tearing a dollar bill into three parts and writing the date of October 11, 1955, on each piece.

In the years after the war, the three men take entirely different paths ("10-Year Montage"). Ted had wanted to become an idealistic lawyer but instead has become a fight promoter and gambler, associating with shady underworld characters. Doug, who had planned to become a painter in Europe, has gone into a high-stress job in advertising in Chicago, and his marriage is crumbling. Angie, who had aspired to become a gourmet chef, is now running a hamburger stand in Schenectady, New York, that he calls The Cordon Bleu. He has a wife and several children.

The three men keep their promise to meet at the bar ten years later. Following the initial excitement, they quickly realize that they now have nothing in common and actually dislike each other. Doug and Ted view Angie as a "hick", while Ted and Angie think Doug is a "snob", and Doug and Angie consider Ted a "punk". Sitting together in an expensive restaurant munching celery, they silently express their regrets in "I Shouldn't Have Come", sung to the tune of "The Blue Danube".

At the restaurant, they encounter some people from Doug's advertising agency, including Jackie Leighton (Charisse), an attractive and brainy advertising executive. Jackie comes up with the idea of reuniting the three men later that evening on a TV show hosted by Madeline Bradville (Gray). She and Ted gradually become involved, though at first Jackie seems motivated by wanting to get Ted on her show. She joins Ted at Stillman's Gym, where Jackie demonstrates a deep knowledge of boxing while cavorting with beefy boxers to the tune of "Baby You Knock Me Out".

Ted gets into trouble with mobsters because he refuses to fix a fight. Evading the gangsters by dashing inside a roller skating rink, he then skates out onto the streets of Manhattan where he realizes that Jackie's affection for him has built up his self-esteem, and he dances exuberantly on roller skates ("I Like Myself"). Doug, meanwhile, has misgivings about the corporate life ("Situation-Wise").

The three men are reluctantly coaxed into the TV reunion, while the gangsters track Ted inside the studio. The three ex-service buddies fight and defeat the gangsters—tricking the head mobster into confessing on live television. The brawl brings the trio back together, and they escape from the studio when the police arrive. They make their way to Tim's Bar & Grill again, where Doug calls his wife and reconciles with her. They remember the occasion where they left the dollar bill ten years before and use that to pay for their last drinks. After Jackie walks in and kisses Ted, the three friends go their separate ways without making plans for another reunion ("The Time for Parting").

== Cast ==
- Gene Kelly as Ted Riley
- Dan Dailey as Doug Hallerton
- Cyd Charisse as Jackie Leighton
- Dolores Gray as Madeline Bradville
- Michael Kidd as Angie Valentine
- David Burns as Tim
- Jay C. Flippen as Charles Z. Culloran

Uncredited:

- Steve Mitchell as Kid Mariacchi
- Hal March as Rocky Heldon
- Paul Maxey as Mr. Fielding
- Peter Leeds as Mr. Trasker
- Alex Gerry as Mr. Stamper
- Madge Blake as Mrs. Stamper
- Wilson Wood as Roy, television director
- Richard Simmons as Mr. Grigman
- Herb Vigran as Nashby
- Lou Lubin as Lefty
- Saul Gorss as Henchman
- Terry Wilson as Henchman
- John Indrisano as Henchman
- Frank Nelson as the Emcee
- June Foray as the voice of Molly Mop

== Production ==
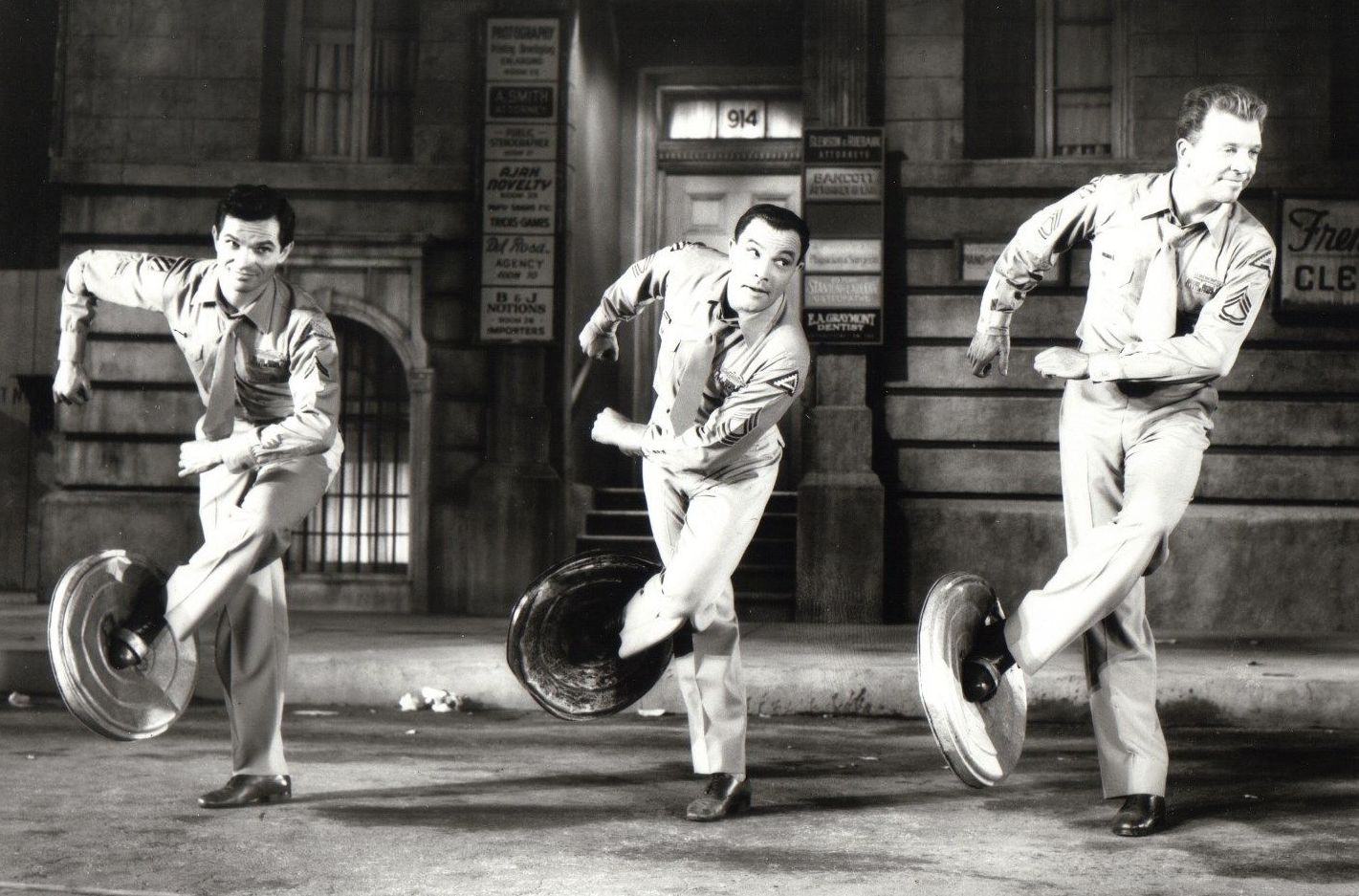
Michael Kidd, Gene Kelly and Dan Dailey dancing on trash can lids in the "Binge" number

Screenwriters Betty Comden and Adolph Green conceived It's Always Fair Weather as a sequel to 1949's On the Town, intending to reunite Gene Kelly with his co-stars Frank Sinatra and Jules Munshin. It was to be produced as a Broadway show. Comden stated, "While we were trying to think of another idea for Gene, by chance we told him this story. Gene liked it." Kelly instead persuaded them to re-envision their idea into a musical film. Comden and Green outlined the story to Arthur Freed, who also asked Roger Edens to attend the pitch meeting. Freed and Edens approved their idea, and Comden and Green began writing their script. Additionally, Comden and Green were permitted to write the lyrics. Edens was not available to compose the music, as he was preoccupied with Deep in My Heart (1954). Based on his work in Invitation to the Dance (1956), Freed hired André Previn as the film composer.

However, MGM studio president Dore Schary refused to hire either Sinatra or Munshin. By this point, Munshin's popularity had declined, having been relegated to comedic supporting roles, and multiple reasons have been given for Sinatra's absence. Apparently, Schary did not want to hire Sinatra due to his difficult work reputation. According to Kelly's biographer Clive Hirschhorn, Sinatra declined to return wearing a sailor suit because he had recently won a Best Supporting Actor Academy Award for From Here to Eternity (1953). As a result, the three main leads were re-imagined as G.I. soldiers.

Ultimately, Kelly chose fellow dancers Dan Dailey, who was under contract to MGM, and Michael Kidd, who had more experience as a choreographer (having choreographed the Broadway and film versions of Guys and Dolls as well as The Band Wagon) than as an actor. Dolores Gray and Cyd Charisse were cast in the central female roles.

Kelly asked his frequent collaborator Stanley Donen to co-direct with him. Donen, who had just scored a major success with Seven Brides for Seven Brothers (with Kidd as choreographer), initially declined to direct. He explained, "I didn't want to co-direct another picture with Kelly at that point. We didn't get on very well, and for that matter, Gene didn't get on really well with anybody." Due to his previous experience from Brigadoon (1954), Kelly was reluctant to shoot in CinemaScope, which he did not find suitable for screen dancing. Regardless, one of Donen's ideas using the CinemaScope format was to split the screen into three parts to depict each of the main leads' careers. To accomplish this effect, the three cameras had to move at precisely the same speed, so the actors would not appear to be jumping across the frame.

Principal photography began on October 13, 1954, and wrapped on March 15, 1955. Due to Dore Schary's attempts at austerity, It's Always Fair Weather was not as lavishly produced when compared to An American in Paris (1951) and Singin' in the Rain (1952). Comden and Green sensed this during the scriptwriting process. On past titles, production numbers had to be approved by producer Arthur Freed. However, they now had to get final approval from Schary. Green explained, "It was made when the era of musicals was over, at least at MGM." Comden further added, "It was over. I don't think Gene was quite the star he was. He wasn't that popular anymore, and neither were musicals."

Comden, Green, and Previn had written a song titled "Love is Nothing but a Racket" as a slow ballad duet between Kelly and Charisse. Kelly objected to the song, complaining to Previn that "nobody wants to sit still for a ballad." At his insistence, Kelly recorded the song at quadruple the original tempo, but the number was cut from the film. Another production number titled "Jack and the Space Giants" featured Kidd performing an elaborate ten-minute dance with a group of children. The number was recorded and filmed but never previewed. Kelly explained "that number was cut; it didn't come across—it didn't work out. And I think it was cut rightfully so."

== Reception ==
=== Box office ===
According to MGM records, the film earned $1,380,000 in the United States and Canada and $994,000 elsewhere, resulting in a loss of $1,675,000.

=== Critical response ===
Hy Hollinger of Variety wrote the film "takes on advertising agencies and TV commercials, and what emerges is a delightful musical satire that should help empty living rooms and fill up theatres". Bosley Crowther of The New York Times wrote it was a "bright film" that spoofed "the whiskers off TV". Kate Cameron of the New York Daily News praised the film in writing, "Betty Comden and Adolph Green, who wrote the screenplay and composed the lyrics for the new Music Hall film, It's Always Fair Weather, have had some fun at the expense of TV. The picture is a lively, amusing lampoon on some types of video shows and of the sponsors and advertising agencies who back them." Edwin Schallert of the Los Angeles Times felt that while "the premise of the story and screenplay by Betty Comden and Adolph Green is an interesting one, the picture does not get off the ground quite as happily as the theme might promise."

In December 1955, Crowther listed It's Always Fair Weather as one of the year's top ten films. In her book 5001 Nights at the Movies, critic Pauline Kael called the film a "delayed hangover" and wrote that its "mixture of parody, cynicism, and song and dance is perhaps a little sour". She did, however, praise Dailey's "Situation-wise" number and wrote that "to a great extent this is Dailey's movie".

In recent years, the film's reputation has grown among fans of musicals and Gene Kelly, whose tap-dance routine on roller skates to "I Like Myself" is seen as the last great dance solo of his career. Scenes from It's Always Fair Weather were included in MGM's 1976 compilation film, That's Entertainment, Part II, in a segment hosted by Kelly and Fred Astaire.

On the review aggregator website Rotten Tomatoes, the film holds an approval rating of 91%, based on 11 reviews, with an average rating of 6.7/10.

=== Accolades ===
Award	Category	Nominee(s)	Result	Ref.
Academy Awards	Best Story and Screenplay	Betty Comden and Adolph Green	Nominated	
Academy Awards	Best Scoring of a Musical Picture	André Previn	Nominated	
Writers Guild of America Awards	Best Written American Musical	Betty Comden and Adolph Green	Nominated	

== Soundtrack ==
It's Always Fair Weather

Soundtrack album by André Previn
- Length: 41:28
- Labels: Sony Music (1991), Rhino Handmade
- Producer: Dan Rivard

Soundtrack recordings have been issued by Rhino Records and in 1991 by Sony Music.

Track listing:

Lyrics by Betty Comden and Adolph Green; music score by André Previn. All pieces played by MGM Studio Orchestra conducted by André Previn. Between brackets the singers.

1. "Overture" 1:04
2. "March, March" (Gene Kelly, Dan Dailey, Michael Kidd) 1:21
3. "The Binge" 5:07
4. "The Time for Parting" (Gene Kelly, Dan Dailey, Michael Kidd) 2:01
5. "10-Year Montage" 2:18
6. "The Blue Danube (I Shouldn't Have Come)" (Gene Kelly, Dan Dailey, Michael Kidd) 2:30
7. "Music Is Better Than Words" (Dolores Gray) 2:10
8. "Stillman's Gym" (Lou Lubin) 2:10
9. "Baby You Knock Me Out" (Carol Richards [singing for Cyd Charisse], Lou Lubin) 2:40
10. "The Ad Men" (Dan Dailey, Paul Maxey) 0:48
11. "Once Upon a Time" (Gene Kelly, Dan Dailey, Michael Kidd) 3:33
12. "Situation-Wise" (Dan Dailey) 2:49
13. "The Chase" 1:04
14. "I Like Myself" (Gene Kelly) 4:10
15. "Klenzrite" (Dolores Gray) 1:34
16. "Thanks a Lot, But No Thanks" (Dolores Gray) 3:47
17. "The Time for Parting (Finale)" (David Burns and chorus) 1:46

== See also ==
- List of American films of 1955
- List of boxing films
