= Give a Girl a Break =

1953 film directed by Stanley Donen

- Theatrical release poster
- Directed by: Stanley Donen
- Screenplay by: Albert Hackett; Frances Goodrich
- Story by: Vera Caspary
- Produced by: Jack Cummings
- Starring: Marge Champion; Gower Champion; Debbie Reynolds; Helen Wood; Bob Fosse; Kurt Kasznar; Richard Anderson
- Cinematography: William C. Mellor
- Edited by: Adrienne Fazan
- Music by: Burton Lane
- Distributed by: Metro-Goldwyn-Mayer
- Release date: December 3, 1953 (United States)
- Running time: 84 minutes
- Country: United States
- Language: English
- Budget: $1.7 million
- Box office: $1.3 million

Give a Girl a Break is a 1953 American musical romantic comedy film directed by Stanley Donen, starring Debbie Reynolds and the dance team of Marge and Gower Champion. A young Bob Fosse has a featured role.

== Plot ==
When the temperamental star of a new Broadway musical revue in rehearsals walks out, director and choreographer Ted Sturgis suggests casting an unknown for the role. When it is announced in the newspapers, throngs of hopefuls show up. They sing about their hopes in the song, "Give a Girl a Break." The revue's musical composer, Leo Belney, champions ballerina Joanna Moss, while gofer Bob Dowdy is enchanted by novice Suzy Doolittle (Debbie Reynolds). Then producer Felix Jordan persuades Ted's former dance partner, Madelyn Corlane, to come out of retirement to try out, much to Ted's great discomfort. Leo, Bob, and Ted sing about the challenges of re-writing the show for a new performer in "Nothing is Impossible."

Joanna goes home and tells her husband she has a good chance of getting the part. He has exciting news of his own. He has been offered a position as head of the Music Department at a university. They argue and then make up. Suzy goes home to tell her mother she has a chance at the part. Her mother tells her she should spend the evening readying for the audition tomorrow. Bob shows up while she is practicing. She goes out with him. They sing and dance to "In Our United State." Ted visits Madelyn to let her know that if she wants the part she better show up and give a great audition. He begins "The Challenge Dance." She matches him step for step. They are ready to fall into each other's arms when her date for the evening shows up.

Bob fantasizes about dancing with Suzy in a sequence using the songs "Give a Girl a Break" and "In Our United State." Leo fantasizes about conducting an orchestra while Joanna dances to the "Puppet Master Dance." Ted envisions himself dancing with Madelyn to "It Happens Ev'ry Time." Joanna, Suzy and Madelyn all perform well at the audition. Leo, Felix and Ted discuss who should get the part. Bob overhears them talking about Suzy in the role and assuming she has the part, he calls her and tells her she has the part.

A heated discussion ensues. Felix and Leo both want Joanna in the part. Ted prefers Madelyn but he concedes. Joanna accepts the part. Bob calls Suzy to tell her he was mistaken. Suzy is crushed. Ted goes in person to let Madelyn know.

Rehearsals are underway with Joanna. She isn't doing well and runs to her dressing room in tears. Her husband shows up ready to leave town for his new job. Joanna stops crying and happily announces she is pregnant and she is leaving with her husband. Felix, Leo and Ted discuss hiring Suzy for the part. Bob runs and calls her to let her know. She doesn't believe him but he convinces her. However, they have decided to offer the part to Madelyn. But when it becomes clear that Madelyn has left town and can't be reached, the job is offered to Suzy.

Opening night arrives. We see Ted and Suzy dance and sing to "Applause, Applause." The show, and Suzy, are a hit. Ted walks out into the empty theater after the show and sees Madelyn. He asks why she left. She tells him she wanted to find out if it was show business she missed or him. It was him. They run into each other's arms.

== Cast ==
- Marge Champion as Madelyn Corlane
- Gower Champion as Ted Sturgis
- Debbie Reynolds as Suzy Doolittle
- Helen Wood as Mrs. Olga Bradshaw/Joanna Moss
- Bob Fosse as Bob Dowdy
- Kurt Kasznar as Leo Belney
- Richard Anderson as Burton Bradshaw
- William Ching as Anson Prichett
- Lurene Tuttle as Mrs. Doolittle
- Larry Keating as Felix Jordan

== Songs ==
Ira Gershwin, lyrics, and Burton Lane, music

1. "Applause, Applause"
2. "Nothing Is Impossible"
3. "Puppet Master Dance"
4. "Challenge Dance"
5. "Give a Girl a Break"
6. "In Our United State"
7. "It Happens Ev'ry Time"

== Production ==
As Martin Gottfried wrote in his book, All His Jazz: The Life and Death of Bob Fosse, "There were residual elements of the big project it had once been, a score by Burton Lane and Ira Gershwin [their only collaboration], for instance, direction by Stanley Donen and musical supervision by Saul Chaplin. The screenwriters, Frances Goodrich and Albert Hackett, were estimable too, although in this instance they had written a slender story involving three unknown actresses competing for a Broadway role that becomes available when the star walks out." The third lead actress, Helen Wood, had a performing background before being signed by Metro-Goldwyn-Mayer, but would eventually leave Hollywood for stage work in New York, including dancing at Radio City Music Hall. Under the pseudonym "Dolly Sharp" she later co-starred in the landmark pornographic film Deep Throat.

== Reception ==
According to MGM records, the film earned $772,000 in the US and Canada and $506,000 elsewhere, resulting in a loss of $1,156,000.
