= I Love Melvin =

1953 film by Don Weis

- Theatrical release poster
- Directed by: Don Weis
- Screenplay by: George Wells; Ruth Brooks Flippen (Note: Additional dialogue)
- Story by: Laszlo Vadnay
- Produced by: George Wells
- Starring: Donald O'Connor; Debbie Reynolds; Una Merkel; Richard Anderson; Allyn Joslyn
- Cinematography: Harold Rosson
- Edited by: Adrienne Fazan
- Music by: Georgie Stoll
- Production company: Metro-Goldwyn-Mayer
- Distributed by: Loew's, Inc.
- Release date: March 20, 1953
- Running time: 77 minutes
- Country: United States
- Language: English
- Budget: $1.3 million
- Box office: $1.9 million

I Love Melvin is a 1953 American Technicolor musical romantic comedy film directed by Don Weis, starring Donald O'Connor and Debbie Reynolds.

The film's most famous scene depicts Reynolds playing a human American football in a dance sequence. The film reunited O'Connor and Reynolds after 1952's Singin' in the Rain. According to MGM records, the film earned $1,316,000 in the United States and Canada and $654,000 overseas, resulting in a loss of $290,000.

== Plot ==
Judy LeRoy, a chorus girl with dreams of Hollywood stardom, is promoted out of the chorus to play a human football in the Broadway musical Quarterback Kelly. On her way to a dance rehearsal, Judy accidentally bumps into Melvin Hoover, the bumbling assistant to Look magazine photographer Mergo, in Central Park, and after a brief argument, they go their separate ways. That night, after seeing Judy's picture on a poster for Quarterback Kelly, Melvin uses his press credentials and watches her football number from backstage. After the show, as Judy is leaving with her suitor Harry Flack, the heir to a paper box company, Melvin offers to do a photo spread of her for Look, and she accepts.

Melvin visits Judy at her home to take pictures of her, and as they continue spending time together to do photo shoots, they develop feelings for one another. However, Judy's father Frank complains that she has been neglecting Harry. One night, after they go to the movies, Judy reveals to Melvin that her family is pressuring her to marry the well-to-do Harry, and asks him to put her on the cover of Look, hoping her family will leave her alone. Desperate to win Judy's affections, Melvin promises he will try. The next day, he plasters the Look offices with photographs of Judy, but the editors choose to feature a race horse on the cover.

After learning that Quarterback Kelly will close in three weeks, Judy worries that she has no other job prospects. She tells Melvin that Harry proposed to her the previous night, though she has not yet given an answer, and that he is coming to dinner to talk to her father. Melvin enlists Mergo to create a fake issue of Look with Judy's photograph on the cover. As Harry prepares to ask Frank for Judy's hand, Melvin arrives and shows her the fake issue. Before Melvin can explain the truth, Judy excitedly shows it to her family and announces she cannot marry Harry.

When the next issue of Look comes out, Judy and her family are devastated that she is not featured on the cover. Melvin, too nervous to confess the truth, claims that Judy's picture will be on the cover of the next issue. After several issues without Judy on the cover, Frank angrily asks the Look editor, Mr. Henneman, when Judy's cover will come out. As Judy rushes to the Look offices with her mother, Henneman informs them that the cover they saw was a fake, and Judy concludes that Melvin created the fake cover to prevent her from marrying Harry. Mergo reveals that Melvin has disappeared after quitting three weeks earlier. Judy tearfully declares her love for Melvin, and the police begin searching for him.

While hiding in Central Park, Melvin sees a man reading a copy of Look with Judy's picture on the cover. Assuming it is a fake, Melvin grabs the magazine and is chased through the park by the police. Judy and her family arrive and, after learning that Melvin is in the park, start chasing him as well until Judy and Melvin eventually bump into each other on the same spot where they first met. She shows him the magazine, which contains a full-page ad reporting Melvin's disappearance, and the two kiss.

== Cast ==
- Donald O'Connor as Melvin Hoover
- Debbie Reynolds as Judy LeRoy (née Schneider)
- Una Merkel as Mom Schneider
- Richard Anderson as Harry Flack
- Allyn Joslyn as Frank Schneider
- Les Tremayne as Mr. Henneman
- Noreen Corcoran as Clarabelle Schneider
- Jim Backus as Mergo
- Barbara Ruick as studio guide
- Robert Taylor as himself (cameo appearance in Judy's dream)

== Music ==
Lyrics by Mack Gordon, and music by Josef Myrow

1. "Lady Loves" (Debbie Reynolds)
2. "We Have Never Met as Yet" (Debbie Reynolds and Donald O'Connor)
3. "Saturday Afternoon Before the Game" (Chorus)
4. "Where Did You Learn to Dance" (Debbie Reynolds and Donald O'Connor)
5. "I Wanna Wander" (Donald O'Connor)
6. "Life Has Its Funny Ups and Downs" (Noreen Corcoran)
7. "And There You Are" (Instrumental) (Georgie Stoll and the M-G-M Studio Orchestra)

== Comic book adaptation ==
- Eastern Color Movie Love #20 (April 1953)
