= Duchess of Idaho =

1950 film by Robert Zigler Leonard

- Theatrical release poster
- Directed by: Robert Z. Leonard
- Written by: Dorothy Cooper; Jerry Davis; Sid Fields
- Produced by: Joe Pasternak
- Starring: Van Johnson; Esther Williams; Paula Raymond
- Cinematography: Charles Edgar Schoenbaum
- Edited by: Adrienne Fazan
- Music by: Albert Sendrey; George Stoll
- Distributed by: Metro-Goldwyn-Mayer
- Release dates: July 20, 1950 (New York); August 3, 1950 (Los Angeles)
- Running time: 98 minutes
- Country: United States
- Language: English
- Budget: $1,705,000
- Box office: $4,236,000

Duchess of Idaho is an American musical romantic comedy produced in 1950 by Metro-Goldwyn-Mayer. Directed by Robert Z. Leonard, it was the fourth film pairing Esther Williams and Van Johnson. It was filmed at the MGM lot with exteriors shot in Sun Valley, Idaho.

== Plot ==
Christine Riverton Duncan attempts to play matchmaker for her lovelorn friend Ellen by pursuing Douglas J. Morrissen, Jr., the man whom Ellen loves, all the way to Idaho. While there, Christine decides to play a joke on Douglas. After boarding his train to Sun Valley, Christine wins his affections and then shocks him with hints that she expects a commitment. Once she arrives in Sun Valley, things become problematic when Christine falls in love with hotel bandleader Dick Layne. During her time in Sun Valley, Christine wins the title of "Duchess of Idaho" in a dance contest.

== Cast ==
- Esther Williams as Christine Riverton Duncan
- Van Johnson as Dick Layn
- John Lund as Douglas J. Morrissen Jr.
- Paula Raymond as Ellen Hallet
- Mel Tormé as Cyril, the Bellhop
- Lena Horne as herself (cameo appearance)
- Eleanor Powell as herself (cameo appearance)
- Clinton Sundberg as Matson
- Connie Haines as Peggy Elliot
- Amanda Blake as Linda Kinston
- Tommy Farrell as Chuck
- Sig Arno as Monsieur Le Blanche
- Dick Simmons as Alec I. Collins
- Red Skelton as himself (cameo appearance)
- The Jubalaires (cameo appearance)

== Production ==
In November 1947, Esther Williams was announced as the film's star. Dorothy Cooper and Jerry Davis were assigned the script. Robert Cummings was originally mentioned as a potential male lead but the role went to Van Johnson, who had starred in three previous films with Williams. Ricardo Montalbán was announced as the third lead. Filming was delayed when Williams became pregnant, and it was then announced that Cummings and Janet Leigh would support Williams and Johnson. These roles were eventually played by John Lund (borrowed from Paramount) and Paula Raymond.

The film marked Eleanor Powell's first film appearance in six years as well as her last film appearance. Williams reported that Powell had practiced her routine until her feet bled, claiming that it had to be perfect.

Lena Horne's contract with MGM also ended with this film, although she would make several more MGM musical appearances later in the decade.

In her autobiography Million Dollar Mermaid, Williams called the film a "re-hash of the Esther Williams formula: the mismatched lovers plot. It was enough to give one a case of cinematic deja vu."

== Soundtrack ==
- "Let's Choo Choo Choo to Idaho": written by Al Rinker and Floyd Huddleston, sung by Van Johnson, Connie Haines and the Jubilaires
- "You Can't Do Wrong Doin' Right": written by Al Rinker and Floyd Huddleston, sung by Van Johnson and Connie Haines
- "Of All Things": written by Al Rinker and Floyd Huddleston, sung by Connie Haines
- "Baby Come Out of the Clouds": written by Henry Nemo and Lee Pearl, sung by Lena Horne

Several musical numbers were cut from the theatrical release:

- "Warm Hands, Cold Heart", sung by Mel Tormé
- "You Won't Forget Me", sung by Lena Horne
- "You Do Something to Me", sung by Lena Horne

The first two performances would later surface on a special DVD packaged in a 2004 box set of the That's Entertainment! films.

== Reception ==
In a contemporary review for The New York Times, critic A. H. Weiler wrote: "Metro-Goldwyn-Mayer, which has used noted vacation oasis as movie backgrounds before, now has discovered Sun Valley as a backdrop for 'Duchess of Idaho'. ... The discovery is something less than monumental. For in this romantic comedy in which Esther Williams is abetted by handsome men, beautiful women and equally beautiful swimming pools and snowy slopes suitable for skiing, there is proof that a venerable formula has not been ignored. The principals, as well as their surroundings, never looked lovelier than they do in the panchromatic hues of Technicolor and the story is routine and often painfully obvious. The company, in effect, never left home. Precisely what sort of verve and gaiety the scenarists had in mind is hard to determine from the proceedings."

Reviewer Edwin Schallert of the Los Angeles Times called Duchess of Idaho "a surprisingly well-concocted entertainment" and wrote: "Most people will like the film for its light entertainment, and the players in their comedy work are all pretty capable in a routine way."

Billboard reviewed that the film "can thank its lucky songs for saving it from a fate worse than boredom. Technicolor extravaganza's glitter and glamor proves too cumbersome for its flimsy, implausible plot".

According to MGM records the film earned $2,851,000 domestically and $1,385,000 foreign, returning the studio a profit of $921,000.
