= Texas Carnival =

1951 musical film by Charles Walters

- Film poster
- Directed by: Charles Walters
- Screenplay by: Dorothy Kingsley
- Story by: George Wells; Dorothy Kingsley
- Produced by: Jack Cummings
- Starring: Esther Williams; Red Skelton; Howard Keel; Ann Miller
- Cinematography: Robert H. Planck
- Edited by: Adrienne Fazan
- Music by: David Rose
- Production company: Metro-Goldwyn-Mayer
- Distributed by: Loew's, Inc.
- Release dates: September 26, 1951 (Los Angeles); October 12, 1951 (New York)
- Running time: 77 minutes
- Country: United States
- Language: English
- Budget: $1,684,000
- Box office: $3,820,000

Texas Carnival is a 1951 American Technicolor musical film directed by Charles Walters and starring Esther Williams, Red Skelton, Howard Keel and Ann Miller.

== Plot ==
Cornelius "Cornie" Quinell and his partner, Debbie Telford, run an unsuccessful dunk tank game at a Texas carnival. Hungry, Debbie sends Cornie to purchase her a steak. While he does, and wins a prize at a hammer and nail game booth, Cornie meets Dan Sabinas, an inebriated millionaire rancher, who invites him to the Comanche Hotel. Offering to reciprocate his friendship, Cornie sends Dan away in a taxi and promises to return his car. However, Dan instructs the driver to take him to Mexico instead.

When Cornie and Debbie return Dan's car at the hotel, the hotel concierge and Dan's foreman Slim Shelby mistaken them for Dan and his wealthy sister Marilla, whom they have never met. Cornie decides to keep the ruse until the real Dan arrives, whereby he and Debbie enjoy the luxury. Believing she is the real Marilla, Dan flirts with Debbie near the pool, but she faints from hunger. Slim saves and takes her to Dan's hotel suite. There, Debbie is treated to an expensive room service meal.

The next day, Sheriff Jackson, an oil millionaire, invites Cornie to meet his daughter Sunshine Jackson. After she performs a number, Cornie spends an afternoon with Sunshine while Debbie borrows clothes from Marilla's closet. In the lobby, Debbie feigns a headache when she runs into Slim. Cornie returns, and Debbie demands to leave, but he confesses Dan's car broke down while riding with Sunshine.

Later that night, Slim invites Debbie to a banquet in her honor. She attends and afterwards, begins to fall in love with Slim. A day later, Cornie plays a poker game, unaware that jellybeans used for chips are worth big money. He loses $17,000 that he is unable to repay unless he can win a Texas chuckwagon race. Debbie calculates their hotel expenses, and unable to repay, they unsuccessfully attempt to sneak out of the hotel.

Near a late night campfire, Slim proposes to Debbie but she runs away. The next day, Dan drunkenly arrives at his hotel suite, although he does not remember Cornie. In an attempt to inebriate Dan again, Cornie becomes intoxicated himself at the bar. There, Sheriff Jackson believes the real Dan Sabinas is an imposter. Before the race starts, as Debbie tries to sober up Cornie, the real Marilla arrives. Marilla makes a deal to pay their debt if they win the race.

Although the chuckwagon falls apart, Cornie wins the race with Debbie's help. They return to their former lives at the carnival, with Debbie and Slim as lovers.

== Cast ==
- Esther Williams as Debbie Telford
- Red Skelton as Cornie Quinell
- Howard Keel as Slim Shelby
- Ann Miller as Sunshine Jackson
- Paula Raymond as Marilla Sabinas
- Keenan Wynn as Dan Sabinas
- Glenn Strange as Tex Hodgkins
- Tom Tully as Sheriff Jackson

== Production ==
The film, originally titled The Carnival Story, was envisioned as a vehicle for Betty Hutton. In February 1950, the project was announced as a vehicle for Esther Williams and Red Skelton, their third film together, following Bathing Beauty (1944) and Neptune's Daughter (1949). Filming was delayed because of Williams' pregnancy. In August 1950, Howard Keel and Ann Miller joined the cast.

The film was retitled Texas Carnival in November 1950. In December 1950, MGM announced that Charles Walters would direct.

Filming started in late January 1951 and wrapped by early April.

== Reception ==
In a contemporary review for The New York Times, critic Bosley Crowther wrote: "It is the omnivorous Mr. Skelton ... who not only gobbles up entirely every scene that he plays alone but also snatches the white meat from the others in every scene that he plays with them. ... But then it may be that all of them did have more to do and their stuff later was cut from the picture. Somehow it looks that way. The continuity rambles and the bridges are often quite abrupt. Indeed, the scrappy nature of the whole thing, for all its bright Technicolored elegance, gives the impression that it was pared down to a straight Skelton comedy. As such, it fulfills a purpose. It is straight Skelton comedy, all right—big, brawling, boisterous—like Texas. Or, if you wish, like a carnival."

Critic Philip K. Scheuer of the Los Angeles Times wrote: "The handiest compliment I can pay 'Texas Carnival' ... is that it seems even shorter than its running time of an hour and a quarter. ... I'm glad to note that the studio is letting Skelton loosen up again; he's a clown first and a straight man second, and don't let anybody forget it."

According to MGM records, the film earned $2,366,000 in the U.S. and Canada and $1,454,000 elsewhere, resulting in a profit of $681,000.^{[1]}
