= Meet Me in St. Louis (disambiguation) =

Meet Me in St. Louis is a 1944 film starring Judy Garland.

Meet Me in St. Louis may also refer to:

- Meet Me in St. Louis (1959 film), a remake of the 1944 film
- "Meet Me in St. Louis," a 1966 episode of Summer Fun (TV series) based on the 1944 film
- Meet Me in St. Louis (musical), a 1989 Broadway production based on the 1944 film
- "Meet Me in St. Louis, Louis", a song written to celebrate the 1904 Louisiana Purchase Exposition in St. Louis and featured in both the film and the musical
- Meet Me in St. Louis (album), a Decca Records album of songs from the 1944 film
- Meet Me in St. Louis (band), a British post-hardcore band
- Meet Me in St. Louis (novel), a 1942 novel by Sally Benson that was the basis for the 1944 film
