= Join Bing & Sing Along =

Join Bing & Sing Along (33 Great Songs)

Studio album by Bing Crosby
- Released: 1960
- Recorded: December 16/17, 1959
- Genre: Vocal
- Length: 38:39
- Label: Warner Bros.

Bing Crosby chronology
How the West Was Won (w/ Rosemary Clooney) (1960)	Join Bing & Sing Along (33 Great Songs) (1960)	Bing & Satchmo (w/ Louis Armstrong) (1960)

Join Bing & Sing Along is the twenty-sixth solo studio album by American singer and actor Bing Crosby, released in 1960 by RCA Victor (LPM/LSP-2276) and immediately thereafter by Warner Bros. Records (W/WS-1363) in 1960. The album consists of twelve medleys of 33 old songs in a singalong format. Bing Crosby sings on all of the tracks except those marked with an asterisk. The chorus and orchestra is conducted by Jack Halloran and their tracks were pre-recorded on November 9 & 13, 1959 with Crosby over-dubbing his vocals. Orchestral arrangements were by Bob Thompson.

The album entered the UK album charts on October 8, 1960 and reached a peak position of No. 7 in an 11-week stay.

Hallmark Records issued the album on CD in 2011 No. 710082.

== Reception ==
Variety magazine reviewed the album saying “Every company seems to be getting into the “Sing Along” act that Mitch Miller started for Columbia in the spring of 1958. Warner Bros. has a good scoring chance with their Bing Crosby version. He leads the vocal chorus through 33 familiar items and he has a way that makes it easy to join along.”

Billboard liked it. "Of course, this is imitation, as are so many of the recent sing-along sets, but it is a first-rate one due to the presence of the old master, Bing Crosby. The grand collection of 33 old-time tunes is made to order for the old Groaner, and he sings them infectiously so that everyone is sure to sing along with him. If exploited this could be a good seller."

Crosby expert, Fred Reynolds, writing in his book The Crosby Collection, 1926–1977 summed it up as follows: "Bing makes little attempt at subtlety of phrasing, ornamentation, niceties or nuances of any kind and his vocals, backed by hearty voices, create only a mechanically jolly atmosphere of a party get-together. There was a criticism, not without justification, that the album was too lightweight for a singer of his calibre but in mitigation it can be fairly claimed that it is a pleasant, happy sound with well chosen classic old songs brought back to life."

== Track listing ==
Side one
No.	Title	Writer(s)	Length
1.	"Take Me Out to the Ball Game" "Meet Me in St. Louis" "Peggy O'Neil"	Jack Norworth, Albert Von Tilzer; Andrew B. Sterling, Kerry Mills; Harry Pease, Ed Nelson, Gilbert Dodge	3:22
2.	"K-K-K-Katy" "Mairzy Doats" "Old MacDonald Had a Farm"	Geoffrey O'Hara; Milton Drake, Al Hoffman, Jerry Livingston; Traditional	3:21
3.	"Aura Lea" "Cuddle up a Little Closer"	W. W. Fosdick George R. Poulton; Karl Hoschna, Otto Harbach	2:56
4.	"Daisy Bell" "The Bowery" "After the Ball"	Harry Dacre; Percy Gaunt, Charles H. Hoyt; Charles K. Harris	2:54
5.	"Long, Long Ago" "On the Banks of the Wabash"* "Seeing Nellie Home"	Thomas Haynes Bayly; Paul Dresser; John Fletcher	3:29
6.	"Shoo Fly, Don't Bother Me" "Oh, Dem Golden Slippers" "On the Road to Mandalay"	Thomas Brigham Bishop; James A. Bland; Oley Speaks, Rudyard Kipling	3:13
Total length:			19:15

Side two
No.	Title	Writer(s)	Length
1.	"Give My Regards to Broadway" "Mary's a Grand Old Name*" "You're a Grand Old Flag"	George M. Cohan; George M. Cohan; George M. Cohan	3:13
2.	"When You Wore a Tulip" "You Were Meant for Me"	Percy Wenrich, Jack Mahoney; Nacio Herb Brown, Arthur Freed	3:12
3.	"Goodbye, My Lady Love" "Linger Awhile" "Heart of My Heart"	Joseph E. Howard; Harry Owens, Vincent Rose; Ben Ryan	3:28
4.	"Doodle Doo-Doo" "All I Do Is Dream of You"	Mel Stitzel, Art Kassel; Nacio Herb Brown, Arthur Freed	3:14
5.	"Alice Blue Gown"* "I Love You Truly*" "When I Grow Too Old to Dream"	Harry Tierney, Joseph McCarthy; Carrie Jacobs-Bond; Sigmund Romberg, Oscar Hammerstein II	3:16
6.	"There'll Be a Hot Time in the Old Town Tonight" "Toot, Toot, Tootsie, (Goo'bye)" "Ta-ra-ra Boom-de-ay*"	Theodore August Metz, Joe Hayden; Ernie Erdman, Dan Russo, Gus Kahn; Henry J. Sayers	3:01
Total length:			19:24

*Non-Bing – orchestra and chorus only
