= Palooka (film) =

1934 American comedy film

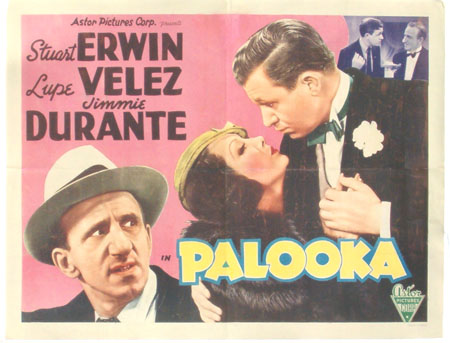
- Lobby card
- Directed by: Benjamin Stoloff
- Written by: Murray Roth (additional dialogue); Ben Ryan (additional dialogue)
- Screenplay by: Jack Jevne; Arthur Kober; Gertrude Purcell
- Based on: Joe Palooka comic strip by Ham Fisher
- Produced by: Edward Small; Harry M. Goetz
- Starring: Stuart Erwin; Lupe Vélez; Jimmy Durante
- Cinematography: Arthur Edeson
- Edited by: Grant Whytock
- Production company: Reliance Picture Corporation
- Distributed by: United Artists
- Release date: January 26, 1934
- Running time: 86 minutes
- Country: United States
- Language: English

Palooka is a 1934 American pre-Code comedy film directed by Benjamin Stoloff and starring Stuart Erwin in the title role, Lupe Velez and Jimmy Durante, and based on the comic strip by Ham Fisher. The film was adapted by Jack Jevne, Arthur Kober, Gertrude Purcell, Murray Roth and Ben Ryan from the comic strip. The film is also known as The Great Schnozzle in the United Kingdom.

The film also stars William Cagney, the younger brother of actor James Cagney in the role of the adversary prize fighter to Knobby.

== Plot ==
Joe Palooka is a naive young man whose father Pete was a champion boxer, but his lifestyle caused Joe's mother Mayme to leave him and to take young Joe to the country to raise him. When a shady boxing manager discovers Joe's natural boxing talent, Joe decides to follow him to the big city, where he becomes a champion and begins to follow his father's path of debauchery, much of it including the glamorous cabaret singer and fortune hunter Nina Madero.

== Cast ==
- Jimmy Durante as Knobby Walsh / Junior
- Lupe Vélez as Nina Madero
- Stuart Erwin as Joe Palooka
- Marjorie Rambeau as Mayme Palooka
- Robert Armstrong as Pete 'Goodtime' Palooka
- Mary Carlisle as Anne
- Thelma Todd as Trixie
- Gus Arnheim as orchestra bandleader
- Franklyn Ardell as Doc Wise
- Tom Dugan as Whitey, Joe's trainer
- Louise Beavers as Crystal, Mayme's housekeeper
- Fred Toones as Smokey
- William Cagney, brother of James Cagney as Al McSwatt
- Rolfe Sedan as Alphonse

== Production ==
Palooka was the second film Edward Small made under an agreement with United Artists. Small bought the rights to the song "Inka Dinka Doo" specifically for the film.

== Soundtrack ==
- "The Band Played On" (music by Charles B. Ward, lyrics by John F. Palmer)
- Lupe Vélez - "Like Me a Little Bit Less (Love Me a Little Bit More)" (music by Burton Lane, lyrics by Harold Adamson)
- Jimmy Durante - "Inka Dinka Doo" (written by Jimmy Durante and Ben Ryan)
- Jimmy Durante - "M-O-T-H-E-R, a Word That Means the World To Me" (music by Theodore Morse, lyrics by Howard Johnson)
- "Count Your Blessings" (written by Irving Caesar, Ferde Grofé Sr. and Edgar A. Guest)
- "Palooka, It's a Grand Old Name" (music by Joseph Burke, lyrics by Ann Ronell)

== See also ==
- List of boxing films
