= Meet Me in St. Louis (musical) =

- Broadway windowcard; Illustration by Hilary Knight
- Music: Hugh Martin; Ralph Blane
- Lyrics: Hugh Martin; Ralph Blane
- Book: Hugh Wheeler
- Basis: Meet Me in St. Louis by Irving Brecher; Fred F. Finklehoffe; Meet Me in St. Louis by Sally Benson
- Productions: 1989 Broadway; 2004 Off-Broadway; 2006 Off-Broadway revival 2009 St. Louis, Missouri; 2013 London

Meet Me in St. Louis is a 1989 musical based on the 1944 film of the same name, which in turn is based on the 1942 novel of the same name by Sally Benson. The musical is about a wealthy lawyer's large family and household living in St. Louis, Missouri in a Victorian era style mansion and their excitement and anticipation of the family and the city on the eve of the 1904 World's Fair. (a.k.a. the Louisiana Purchase Exposition) celebrating the centennial of the Louisiana Purchase from France and Spain. As the year progresses leading up to the fair's opening, the family is distraught and upset over father's proposed promotion and move east to bigger New York City leaving behind all their friends and familiar surroundings.

The later musical varied from the earlier film with additional songs and some additional character development; the focus is not primarily on the character of Esther, as in the film. The musical play ran on Broadway in New York City in 1989, 45 years after the famous 1944 musical feature film starring Judy Garland. It was revived to be performed again Off-Broadway in 2004, / 2006 another 15 years later. Interest and audience continued in its hometown of St. Louis in 2009 followed by a leap across the Atlantic Ocean to London in England by 2013.

== Productions ==
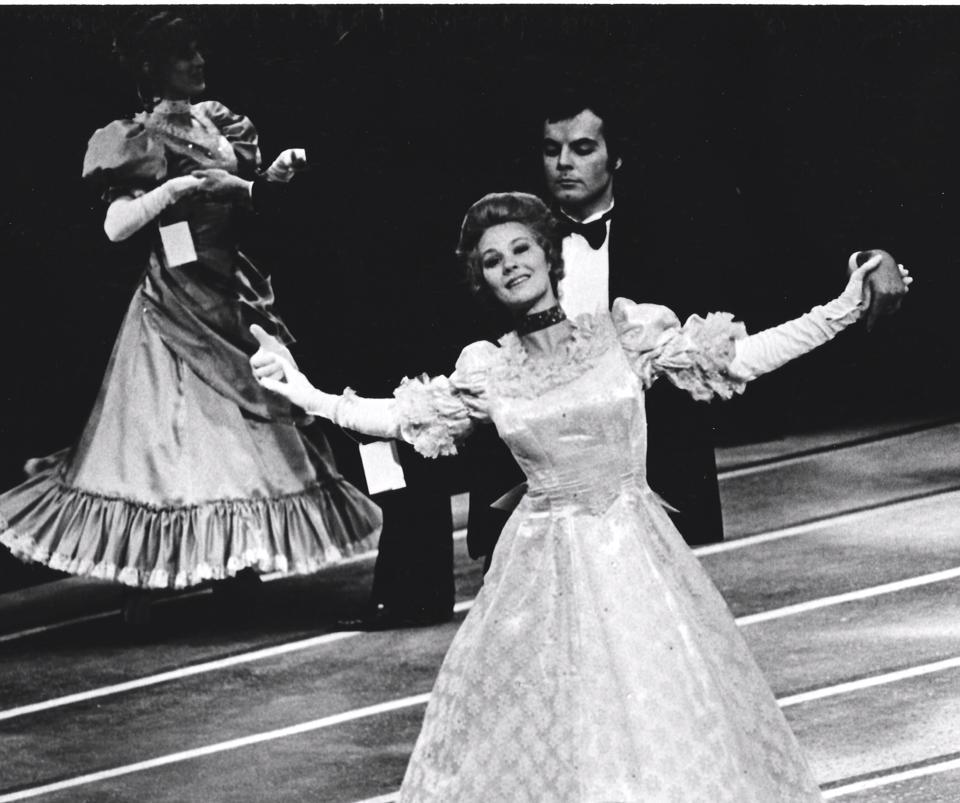
Dancers in a stage production of the musical

The musical opened on Broadway at the George Gershwin Theatre on November 2, 1989, and closed on June 10, 1990, after 252 performances. It was directed by Louis Burke with choreography by Joan Brickhill. Lighting design by Ken Billington.

The show was performed Off-Broadway by the Irish Repertory Theatre in December 2006 through February 2007, with direction by Charlotte Moore (the mother in the Broadway production), choreography by Barry McNabb and sets by Tony Straiges. The cast featured George S. Irving as Grandpa Prophater.

The musical has been produced by Musicals Tonight! (New York), in October 2004 the Paper Mill Playhouse Millburn, New Jersey in November to December 2007, with Brynn O'Malley as Esther, Gregg Edelman as Alonso Smith, and Donna English as Anna Smith, and The Muny, St. Louis in July 2009, with Lewis J. Stadlen as Grandpa Prophater, Brynn O'Malley as Esther Smith, Max von Essen as John Truitt and Stephen Bogardus as Mr. Alonzo Smith.

The musical has also had its UK professional premiere at the Landor Theatre, in Clapham, London. The show ran from 11 December 2013 to 18 January 2014.

== Plot ==
The musical opens in the summer of 1903. The family is going about their daily businesses – Tootie is playing with her dolls, Agnes is practicing her stilt walking, Esther is playing tennis, Rose is relaxing, Lon received his Princeton catalog in the mail, Mrs. Smith and Katie, their maid, went shopping, Grandpa is playing with Agnes, and Mr. Smith was at work ("Opening" / "Meet Me in St. Louis"). Upon request from Esther, Katie asks Mrs. Smith if they could have dinner an hour earlier because her sister is having trouble with her husband. We soon learn that the real reason is that Warren Sheffield, a Yale scholar and heir to a grand fortune, is calling Rose long-distance at 6:30, when they usually eat dinner. Esther was trying to get dinner to be an hour earlier so the family would be out of the room when he called. Soon Rose enters and tells Esther that John Truitt, their neighbor and the boy that Esther has a crush on, is outside with his friend. They pretend to want to go to the pool, and try to attract the boys' attention. However, Agnes enters looking for her cat, and John leaves, causing Esther to lament about how John Truitt never notices her ("The Boy Next Door").

A little later that day, Mr. Smith comes home in a bad mood, because he lost his case. He refuses to eat an hour earlier and storms offstage to go take his cool bath. Meanwhile, Tootie and Agnes begin to fight over a doll, causing the older siblings to have to break them up and remind them that they're all friends (Whenever I'm With You). Everyone exits except for Esther and Mrs. Smith. Esther asks if she is too young to fall in love, and her mother is shocked by the question. She proceeds to tell of how she fell in love with Mr. Smith ("You'll Hear a Bell").

Dinner is approaching, and by now everyone in the family knows about Warren's telephone call except for Mr. Smith. When he joins the family at the dinner table, everyone gulps down their food so they can leave before Warren calls. Unfortunately, they are not fast enough, and the telephone rings. Mr. Smith answers, but is confused when the operators tell him that someone is calling from New York. He hangs up, and Esther accidentally tells him everything out of anger. He soon figures out that he was the only one who didn't know about the call, and tries to put his foot down, but when the phone rings again he tells Rose to answer it. Her phone call turns out to be less than successful, because he was only calling to ask how she was, and he said if his parents knew he was calling, they would kill him. Katie tries to lighten the mood ("Meet Me in St. Louis" (Reprise)).

A few months later, we are at Lon's going-away party, right before he leaves for Princeton. Warren tries to apologize to Rose, but she refuses to accept ("Raving Beauty"). At the party, Esther is formally introduced to John Truitt, pretending not to know who he is. She takes his hat and hides it in the piano. The guests then participate in a square dance called by Lon and Warren ("Skip to My Lou"). Agnes and Tootie have crept to the landing to see what was going on, and after being caught, perform a dance they do with Esther ("Under the Bamboo Tree"). Afterwards the guests leave, but Esther asks John if he would like to come with them to the Fairgrounds on Friday. He agrees, and then she asks him if he will help her turn off the lights, because she's afraid of the dark ("Over the Bannister"). He leaves, leaving Esther slightly disappointed.

On Friday, they get on the trolley to the fairgrounds, where John Truitt just barely makes it on ("The Trolley Song").

Act II opens on Halloween, where Tootie and Agnes are getting ready to go trick or treating. After they leave, Katie asks the older sisters why they won't go out to the Halloween Social. They both respond that men are too bothersome and they'd rather not. Katie gives them some advice ("Touch of the Irish"). Immediately following the number, a scream is heard offstage. Tootie comes in with a bloody lip, saying John Truitt hit her. When he comes by to ask if she's alright, Esther beats him up for hurting her little sister. Agnes enters soon after, telling what happened. They stuffed one of Katie's dresses so it looked like a body, then put it on the trolley tracks so when the motorman had to put on the brakes, the trolley would come off the tracks. Tootie then reveals that it was not John who hurt her, but she fell. Esther is ashamed and goes to apologize to John. He forgives her ("The Boy Next Door" (Reprise)).

Mr. Smith comes home and breaks the news to the family that they are moving to New York. He thought the family would be happy, but they all are shocked and upset. He tries to convince them that it will be fun, but it doesn't work ("A Day in New York"). They all exit, leaving Mr. and Mrs. Smith alone. Mrs. Smith tries to comfort him, reminding him that as long as they are together, they can be happy ("You'll Hear a Bell" (Reprise) / "Wasn't It Fun").

Now it is winter and their last Christmas in St. Louis is fast approaching. Both Rose and Warren are left without dates. Rose didn't respond to Warren's proposal to the dance, so he decided to go with Lucille Ballard who is Lon's girlfriend. Esther and Katie persuade them to go with each other, and Rose and Esther make a plan to fill out Lucille's dance card with the worst people imaginable. Unfortunately, John Truitt comes by and tells Esther that he can't take her to the dance because his tuxedo is locked up in the tailor's. Grandpa comes to the rescue, inviting Esther to the dance with him.

At the ball, Lucille suggests that Warren and Rose and she and Lon be partners for the evening. Esther doesn't realize that, and ends up taking Lucille's dances. Lon leads everyone in a dance he learned at college ("The Banjo"). John comes, in his tuxedo, after calling every Jones in St. Louis until he found who ran the shop. After the dance, John proposes to Esther, but she feels bad about it because he would have to give up going to college to be with her in New York ("You Are for Loving").

Esther enters the house to find Tootie sitting on the couch. She's upset about leaving St. Louis, and has been waiting for Santa to come so she can tell him that they're moving. Esther tries to convince Tootie that New York will be fun ("Have Yourself a Merry Little Christmas"). Mr. Smith sees how upset Tootie is and decides that they can't move to New York.

After hearing the good news, the family goes to the fair and everything works out well ("Trolley Song" (Reprise) / "Meet Me in St. Louis" (Reprise II) / "Finale").

== Characters and Original cast ==
Character	Broadway production
Esther Smith	Donna Kane
John Truitt	Jason Workman
Mr. Alonzo Smith	George Hearn
Mrs. Anna Smith	Charlotte Moore
Sarah Mahala Redway "Tootie" Smith	Courtney Peldon
Katie the Maid	Betty Garrett
Alonzo "Lon" Smith Jr.	Michael O'Steen / David Gunderman
Rose Smith	Juliet Lambert
Grandpa Prophater	Milo O'Shea
Agnes Smith	Rachael Graham
Warren Sheffield	Peter Reardon

The Broadway production also included Tony Award winner Rachel Bay Jones in the ensemble. It was her Broadway debut.

== Songs ==
Act I

- "Meet Me in St. Louis" *
- "Be Anything But a Girl"
- "The Boy Next Door" *
- "Skip to My Lou" *
- "Under the Bamboo Tree" *
- "Banjos"
- "Ghosties and Ghoulies and Things That Go Bump in the Night"
- "Halloween Ballet"
- "Wasn't It Fun"
- "The Trolley Song" *

Act II

- "Ice"
- "Raving Beauty"
- "A Touch of the Irish"
- "You Are for Loving"
- "A Day in New York"
- "The Ball"
- "Diamonds in the Starlight"
- "Have Yourself a Merry Little Christmas" *
- "Paging Mr. Sousa"

* Songs from the film also in the stage version

As of the late 1990s the order of songs was changed, some were removed and some added. The current version is as follows:

Act I

- "Overture" – Instrumental
- "Meet Me in St. Louis" – Ensemble and Smith Family Octet
- "The Boy Next Door" – Esther
- "Meet Me in St. Louis" (Reprise) – Tootie, Agnes, Esther, Rose and Grandpa
- "Whenever I'm with You" – Smith Family Octet
- "You'll Hear a Bell" – Mrs. Smith
- "Meet Me in St. Louis" (Reprise) – Smith Family Octet and Ensemble
- "A Raving Beauty" – Warren and Rose
- "Skip to My Lou" – Lon, Warren, Rose and Ensemble
- "Drunk Song" – Tootie
- "Under the Bamboo Tree" – Esther, Tootie and Agnes
- "Over the Banister" – John
- "The Trolley Song" – Esther and Ensemble

Act II

- "Entr'acte" – Instrumental
- "Touch of the Irish" – Katie, Rose and Esther
- "Boy Next Door" (Reprise) – John and Esther
- "A Day in New York" – Mr. Smith, Mrs. Smith, Esther, Rose, Katie and Grandpa
- "You'll Hear a Bell" (Reprise) – Mrs. Smith
- "Wasn't It Fun?" – Mr. and Mrs. Smith
- "Christmas Waltz" – Instrumental
- "The Banjo" – Lon and Ensemble
- "Auld Lang Syne" – Instrumental
- "You Are for Loving" – John and Esther
- "Have Yourself a Merry Little Christmas" – Esther
- "Trolley Song" (Reprise) – Ensemble
- "Meet Me in St. Louis" (Reprise) – All

Note
The Smith Family Octet – Tootie, Agnes, Rose, Esther, Lon, Mrs. Smith, Katie and Grandpa

== Awards and nominations ==
=== Original Broadway production ===
Year	Award	Category	Nominee	Result
1990	Tony Award	Best Musical		Nominated
1990	Tony Award	Best Book of a Musical	Hugh Wheeler	Nominated
1990	Tony Award	Best Original Score	Hugh Martin and Ralph Blane	Nominated
1990	Tony Award	Best Choreography	Joan Brickhill	Nominated
1990	Theatre World Award		Jason Workman	Won
