= On the Sentimental Side =

Studio album by Bing Crosby
- Released: 2010
- Recorded: June 21/22, 1962
- Studio: United Recording, Hollywood
- Genre: Vocal pop
- Length: 41:05 (original); 51:26 (reissue)
- Label: Collectors' Choice Music

Bing Crosby chronology
A Little Bit of Irish (posthumous edition, recorded in 1966) (1993)	On the Sentimental Side (2010)

On the Sentimental Side was intended to be a long-playing vinyl album and it was recorded in June 1962 by Bing Crosby for his own company, Project Records at United Recording, Hollywood. The album is in a “sing-along” style and Crosby over-dubbed his vocals on accompaniment recorded by the Ivor Raymonde Orchestra and chorus in London in March 1962. The original sessions were produced by Simon Rady for Project Records.

Compositing commenced on July 31, 1962, and was never completed. Robert S. Bader of Bing Crosby Enterprises completed the compositing and mixing in January 2010. The album was issued for the first time by Collectors' Choice Music on CD No. CCM2106.

== Track listing ==
No.	Title	Writer(s)	Length
1.	"My Bonnie" / The Band Played On"	Traditional / John F. Palmer, Charles B. Ward	2:50
2.	"Always" / "Wishing (Will Make It So)"	Irving Berlin / Buddy DeSylva	4:31
3.	"Remember" / "Put On Your Old Grey Bonnet"	Irving Berlin / Stanley Murphy, Percy Wenrich	3:40
4.	"All Alone" / "In the Shade of the Old Apple Tree"	Irving Berlin / Egbert Van Alstyne, Harry Williams	3:21
5.	"How Can I Leave Thee"† / "A Bird in a Gilded Cage" / The Sidewalks of New York"	Traditional / Arthur J. Lamb, Harry Von Tilzer / Charles B. Lawlor, James W. Blake	2:46
6.	"If I Didn't Care" / Blueberry Hill"	Jack Lawrence / Al Lewis, Vincent Rose, Larry Stock	3:46
7.	"Beautiful Dreamer" / "The Last Rose of Summer"	Stephen Foster / Thomas Moore	3:28
8.	"Roll on Silver Moon" / "Now the Day Is Over"	Charles N. Ernest / Sabine Baring-Gould	2:55
9.	"Tom Dooley" / "The Old Gray Mare"	Traditional / Traditional	2:21
10.	"Together" / "What'll I Do"	Lew Brown, Buddy DeSylva, Ray Henderson / Irving Berlin	3:18
11.	"Look for the Silver Lining" / "Say It with Music"	Irving Berlin / Buddy DeSylva / Jerome Kern	4:12
12.	"Did You Ever See a Dream Walking?" / A Pretty Girl Is Like a Melody"	Mack Gordon, Harry Revel / Irving Berlin	3:57

†=chorus and orchestra only

Bonus tracks on CD reissue
No.	Title	Writer(s)	Length
13.	"Because"	Edward Teschemacher, Guy d'Hardelot	1:57
14.	"Love's Old Sweet Song"	G. Clifton Bingham, James Lynam Molloy	2:03
15.	"Smilin' Through"	Arthur A. Penn	1:44
16.	"Whither Thou Goest"	Guy Singer	2:46
17.	"Too Ra Loo Ra Loo Ral"	James Royce Shannon	1:51
