= The Strawberry Blonde =

1941 romantic comedy drama film by Raoul Walsh

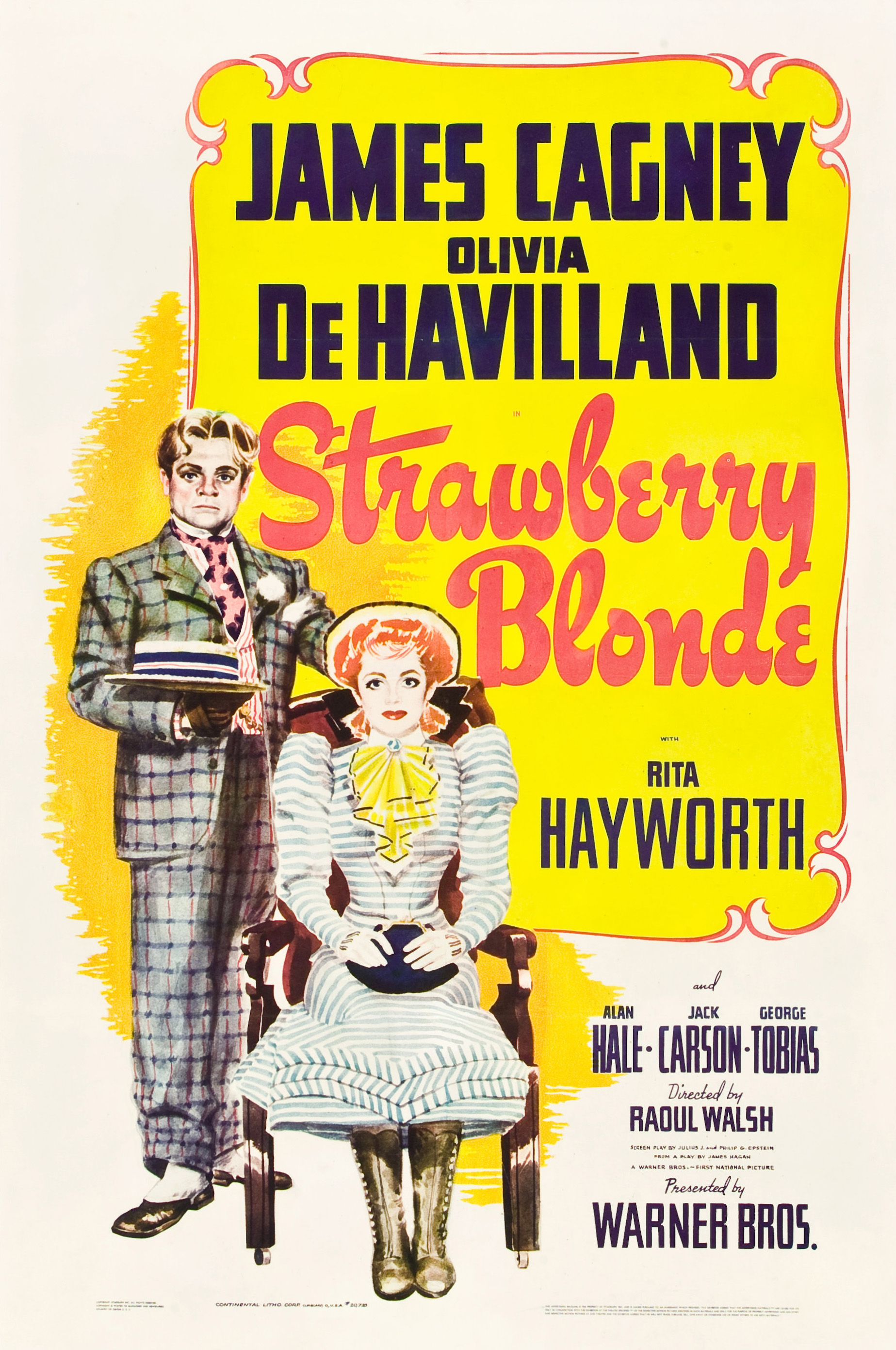
- Theatrical release poster
- Directed by: Raoul Walsh
- Screenplay by: Julius J. Epstein; Philip G. Epstein
- Based on: One Sunday Afternoon; 1933 play by James Hagan
- Produced by: Hal B. Wallis
- Starring: James Cagney; Olivia de Havilland; Rita Hayworth; Jack Carson
- Cinematography: James Wong Howe
- Edited by: William Holmes
- Music by: Heinz Roemheld
- Production company: Warner Bros. Pictures
- Distributed by: Warner Bros. Pictures
- Release date: February 21, 1941
- Running time: 97 minutes
- Country: United States
- Language: English

The Strawberry Blonde (promoted as simply Strawberry Blonde) is a 1941 American romantic comedy drama film directed by Raoul Walsh, starring James Cagney and Olivia de Havilland, and featuring Rita Hayworth, Alan Hale, Jack Carson, and George Tobias. Set in 1890s New York City, it features songs of that era such as "The Band Played On", "Bill Bailey", "Meet Me in St. Louis, Louie", "Wait Till The Sun Shines Nellie", and "Love Me and the World Is Mine". It was nominated for an Academy Award in 1941 for Best Scoring of a Musical Picture.

The film was a more lighthearted remake of the 1933 non-musical movie One Sunday Afternoon directed by Stephen Roberts and starring Gary Cooper. Unlike the earlier picture, it was a hit. In 1948, Walsh directed a third version of the story, also called One Sunday Afternoon, featuring early 20th-century songs combined with original musical numbers.

== Plot ==
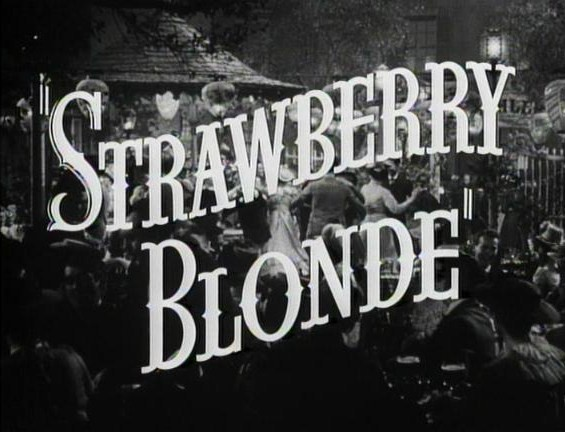
Trailer title card

Biff Grimes is a middle-class dentist in New York City who is trying to relax on a Sunday afternoon, setting plans to go on a walk with his wife, Amy. Although he normally refuses appointments on Sundays, he receives a call from Hugo Barnstead, an old partner and nemesis, who desperately needs dental attention. Biff accepts the appointment, remarking that after his recent release from jail, he had considered tracking down Hugo and killing him. He thinks back to the events of the previous decade over a long flashback.

Aspiring dentist Biff and his enterprising friend Hugo go on a series of double dates with fashionable strawberry-blonde society girl Virginia Brush and her less-glamorous best friend, Amy Lind, a hardworking nurse with suffragette sympathies. From the outset, Biff is prejudiced against Amy's independent tendencies and states his preference for the more alluring Virginia. With Hugo's consent, the men alternately spend time with each girl. They often meet in the park, to Biff's benefit as he has somewhat of a ruffian reputation.

After serendipitously spending a day in the city together, Biff quickly falls in love with Virginia. She returns his affection but has already made a series of other dates before they can get together again. While waiting to meet Virginia in the park for a follow-up date, Biff is disappointed by Amy's sudden appearance. He learns that Virginia and Hugo have abruptly married that afternoon. While stating his anger at Hugo's betrayal, he finds it easy to accept the loss of Virginia as Amy comforts him and he realizes she is the woman of stronger character.

Biff goes on to marry Amy and the two meet Hugo and Virginia for dinner. Virginia has become disappointed in her marriage to Hugo and continues to care for Biff, insisting that Hugo make him the vice president of his building company. Biff accepts but is disappointed to by a lack of engagement in the business, simply being told to sign papers he doe not understand. When the city announces an investigation of the company for negligence, Hugo claims ignorance and Biff takes the fall due to the appearance of his signature on numerous documents. He serves a five-year jail sentence, after which he returns to Amy and his dental trade. When Hugo arrives with a toothache, he is surprised to find that the dentist is Biff, who pulls the tooth without administering laughing gas.

== Cast ==
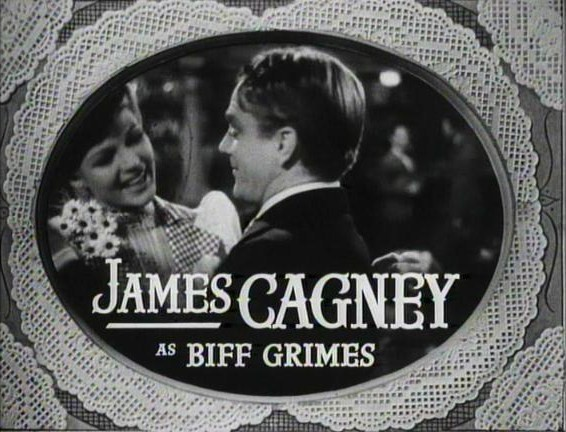
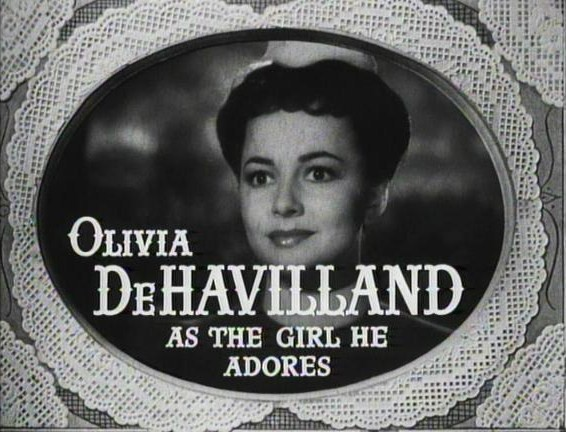
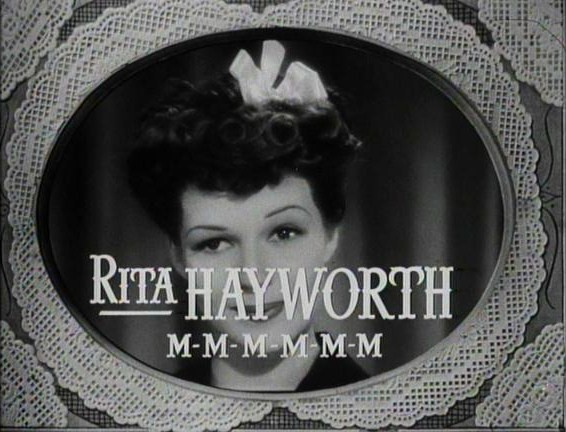
Trailer stills
- James Cagney as T. L. 'Biff' Grimes
- Olivia de Havilland as Amy Lind
- Rita Hayworth as Virginia Brush
- Alan Hale as William 'Old Man' Grimes
- Jack Carson as Hugo Barnstead
- George Tobias as Nicholas Pappalas
- Una O'Connor as Mrs. Timothy Mulcahey
- George Reeves as Harold
- Lucile Fairbanks as Harold's girlfriend
- Edward McNamara as Big Joe
- Helen Lynd as Josephine
- Herbert Heywood as Toby
- Russell Hicks as Treadway (uncredited)
- Frank Mayo as Policeman (uncredited)
- Jack Mower as Streetcleaner (uncredited)
- Nan Wynn as Rita Hayworth's singing voice (uncredited)

== Development and production ==
Both the director of Strawberry Blonde, Raoul Walsh, and its star James Cagney came to the project looking for a change of pace. Walsh had just completed the dark Humphrey Bogart/Ida Lupino vehicle High Sierra, shot largely on location, and the good notices the film received had Walsh "as fired up as Jack Warner to keep the ball rolling on projects in development and production." The transition between the outdoorsy film noir and the light and sentimental studio-centered Strawberry Blonde "proved no problem" for Walsh.

Cagney usually played tough guys at Warner Bros. Pictures in the early 1930s, but he had shown his talents at lighter, musical material in films like Footlight Parade (1933) He left the studio in mid-decade, then returned in 1938 with a contract that gave him more control in choosing roles and brought his younger brother William Cagney as assistant producer and informal buffer between himself and studio executives. However, Cagney soon found himself getting slotted into tough guy parts. and by 1940, he "wanted a nostalgic part—any part—to take him away from the gangsters he was now loathe [sic] to play."

A property on the lot that might fill that bill was One Sunday Afternoon. It had started early in 1933 as a successful Broadway play by James Hagan and had been adapted later that year by Paramount as a vehicle for Gary Cooper. It was "the only real flop of Cooper's stellar and carefully orchestrated career"—and the only Cooper picture ever to lose money. James Cagney had qualms about it because it would be a remake, and Jack Warner knew it needed "complete retooling". It was a "pet project" of William Cagney, who saw it as a "gift to [the brothers'] mother, Carrie Cagney, who would live only a few more years", and Warner recognized the inside track this leverage would give him with his often recalcitrant star. Warner screened the 1933 film and wrote a memo to his production head Hal B. Wallis telling him to watch it also: "It will be hard to stay through the entire running of the picture, but do this so you will know what not to do."

Wallis knew the trick was to tailor the script as a vehicle for Cagney, who had yet to commit either to the project or even to his brother. Wallis had a first draft of a screenplay done by Stephen Morehouse Avery that satisfied no one; he called in the Epstein brothers, Julius and Phillip, for another vision—one that might hook Cagney into the project. The brothers and William all concurred that the first thing to do was move things from the play's midwest setting to New York City because "they all knew it so much better." Said Julius: "We thought the reason [the Cooper film] lost money was it was too bucolic. It took place in a little country town. We said 'Change it to the big city. Put it in New York.'" The Epstein version quickly took shape, aided by the objective of making it a Cagney picture. "When we went on the rewrite," Julius said, "we knew it was for Cagney. That was a help."

Cagney still was reluctant. Wallis was getting impatient; he considered the emerging John Garfield for the role of Biff Grimes. By July 1940, concern about the impasse stretched all the way to New York, where Harry Warner cabled brother Jack that he was willing to give Cagney 10% of the gross, and then Cagney began to budge. One issue was that he didn't want to play scenes with the much-taller Jack Carson; he would prefer the shorter Brian Donlevy or the shorter-still Lloyd Nolan. The difference was that Nolan commanded $2,000 per week and that Carson got $750 per week. Despite Cagney's misgivings, Carson was cast as Hugo Barnstead.

More problematic was the casting of the Virginia Brush role, which was originally created for Ann Sheridan, the studio's "Oomph Girl". Sheridan was in one of her contract disputes with the studio and refused to do the film. Jack Warner asked Walsh to talk Sheridan into it, but she still refused. Wallis tested actress Brenda Marshall for the part, but Walsh spoke up about "a girl" he had seen in several Columbia pictures: young Rita Hayworth. "He thought she was perfect for the part, and after she was signed without a hitch, from then on he always referred to Hayworth as his 'find' (despite [the splash she had made in] Only Angels Have Wings released in 1939)."

Hayworth received $450 per week for the film and began work immediately with makeup man Perc Westmore to find the look for the title character in what would soon be retitled Strawberry Blonde. After shooting test footage and many stills of his makeup experiments, Westmore memoed Wallis: "Her head is so large and she has so much hair that it will practically be impossible to put a wig on her. Whatever color you decide on, she will be happy to have it made that color. Then at the end of the picture, we will dye it back to its natural color." This film marked the first time Hayworth was seen as a redhead and the only time that audiences heard her real singing voice.

The shooting of Strawberry Blonde began on October 21, 1940. Wallis and Walsh quickly came to problems. The producer thought his director was coming in too close on the actors, that the close-ups decreased the nostalgia by obscuring the period backgrounds. Wallis's October 29, 1940 memo chided "You have so much opportunity on this picture for atmosphere and composition...and I hate like hell to see them go by without full advantage being taken of what we have." (Several months later, with Michael Curtiz on Yankee Doodle Dandy, Wallis's complaints would be just the opposite: "Mike, get the story from the actors' faces, instead of going all over the place.") Walsh in reality had "memorized the entire script and had worked out every camera angle and move—a visual map of just how he would shoot." As the footage continued to flow, the memos slowed, then stopped.

Olivia de Havilland had no idea of the friction between the two, no problem with the closeups, and she debunked Walsh's reputation as a tough guy. "I loved working with Raoul. He seemed to understand perfectly the characters we were playing, and to understand, too, the 'actor' approach to them. It was a happy, harmonious set, a happy picture to make." The screenwriters too found Walsh a good boss. Julius Epstein said he "was great. He was very businesslike. He didn't change a word on The Strawberry Blonde. Some writers complained about Walsh. My experience with him was very good."

When Warner Bros. released Strawberry Blonde on February 21, 1941, "the studio knew it had a hit on its hands." Walsh considered it his most successful picture to date, and he called it his favorite film.

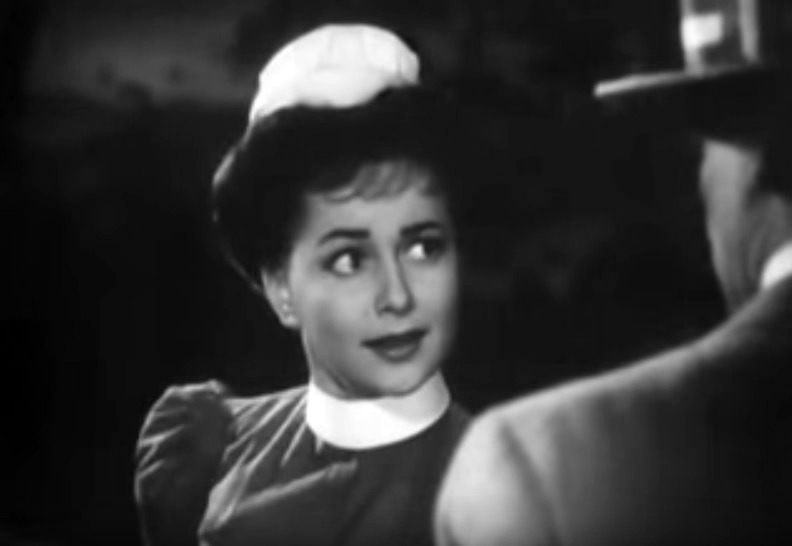
Amy Lind shocks Biff with her modern "new ideas", so scandalous in the Gay '90s

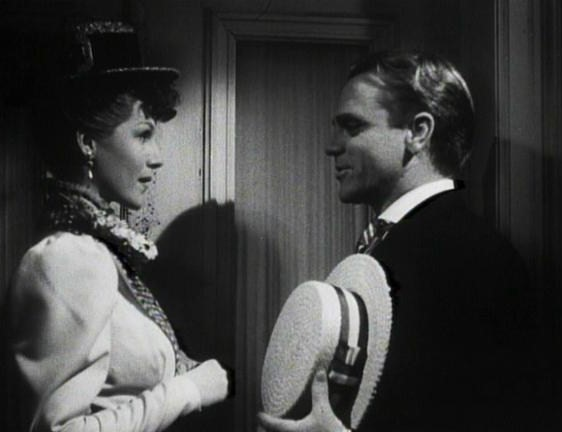
Virginia's flirtatious beauty captivates Biff and holds him tight for years afterward

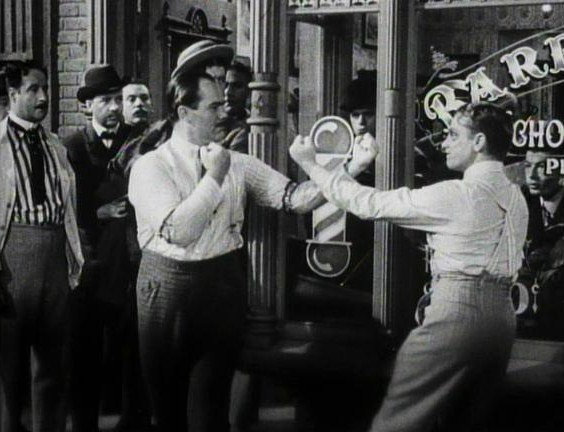
Pugnacious Biff calls out Nicholas's barbershop patron over Miss Brush's honor

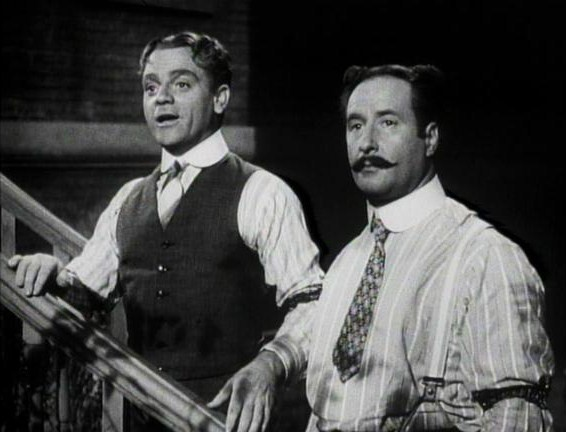
Biff and Nicholas, lifelong pals; George Tobias received good notices as Nicholas

== Reception ==
From the 1941 trailer:
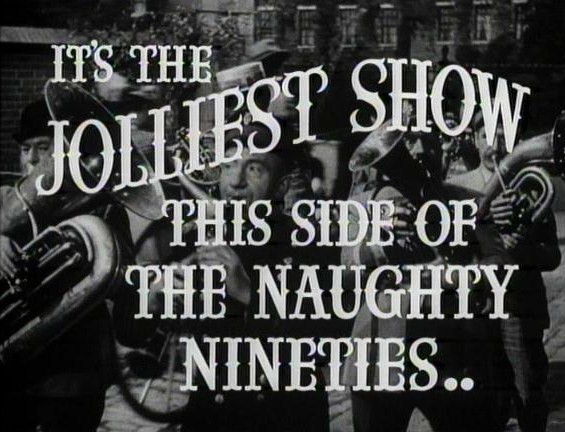
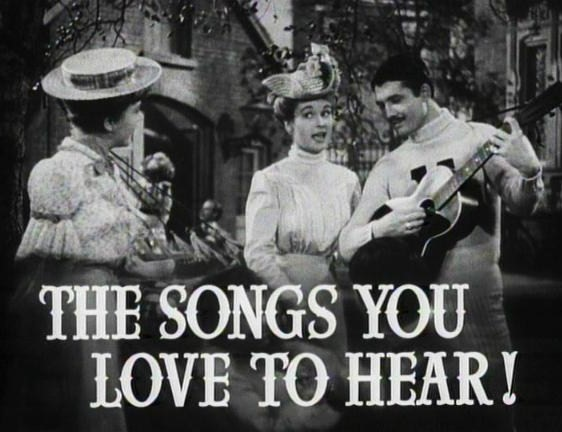
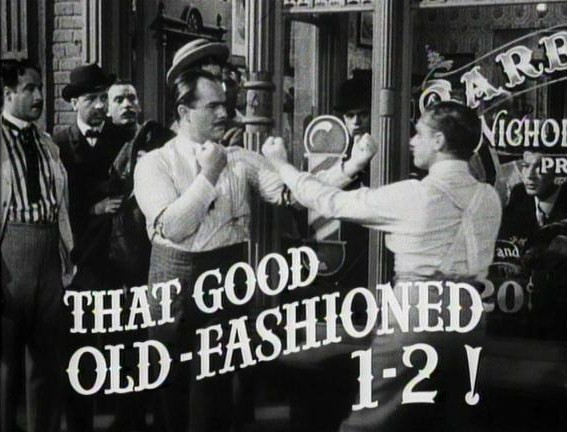
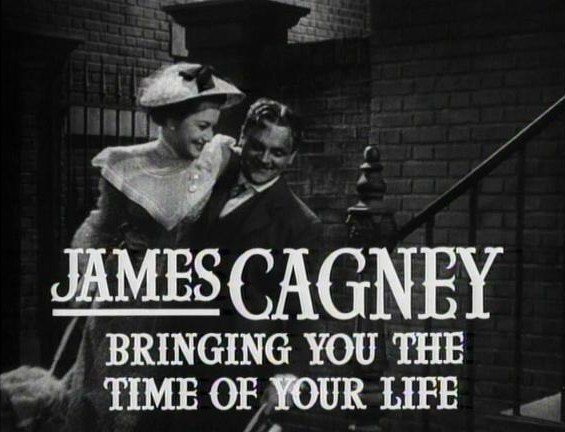
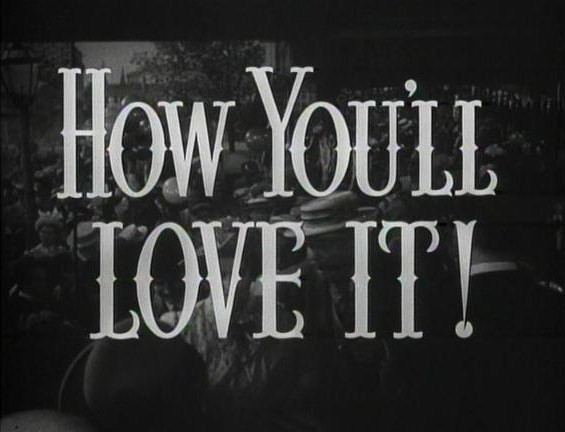

Critic Bosley Crowther praised Strawberry Blonde in a New York Times February 1941 review, calling it "lusty, affectionate, and altogether winning." Part of its "amiable, infectious quality", he wrote, came from its cast: "James Cagney, true to form, is excellent as the pugnacious and proud little guy who 'don't take nothing from nobody' cause that's the kind of hairpin he is. Olivia de Havilland is sweet and sympathetic as the girl he marries and Rita Hayworth makes a classic 'flirt' of the one who got away." Part of it also came from the screenplay by Casablanca writers Julius J. and Philip G. Epstein: they took "the little play, One Sunday Afternoon... and fashioned from it a gas-lit comedy, laced with sentimental romance, about a fellow who thinks he's been played for a chump, but, in the end, discovers that he's the winner." Crowther also liked the supporting performances of George Tobias and Jack Carson. On Rotten Tomatoes, the film has an aggregate score of 100% based on 9 modern and contemporary critic reviews, with an average rating of 7.8/10.

The entertainment trade publication Variety liked it as well: "Cagney and de Havilland provide topnotch performances that do much to keep up interest in the proceedings. Rita Hayworth is an eyeful as the title character, while Jack Carson is excellent as the politically ambitious antagonist of the dentist."

In Halliwell's Film Guide (1994), reviewer Leslie Halliwell describes the production as a "pleasant period comedy drama" and recognizes its three stars and cinematographer James Wong Howe for their outstanding contributions.

In 1998, Jonathan Rosenbaum of the Chicago Reader included the film in his unranked list of the best American films not included on the AFI Top 100.

== Soundtrack ==
- "The Band Played On"
  - Music by Chas. B. Ward
  - Lyrics by John F. Palmer
- "Won't You Come Home Bill Bailey"
  - Music and Lyrics by Hughie Cannon
- "Meet Me in St. Louis, Louis"
  - Music by Kerry Mills
  - Lyrics by Andrew B. Sterling
- "In the Evening by the Moonlight"
  - Music and Lyrics by James Allen Bland
- "Wait Till the Sun Shines, Nellie"
  - Music by Harry von Tilzer
  - Lyrics by Andrew Sterling
- "The Fountain in the Park"
  - Music by Ed Haley
- "The Red, White and Blue", aka "Columbia, the Gem of the Ocean"
  - Written by David T. Shaw
  - Arranged by Thomas A. Beckett
- "In the Good Old Summertime"
  - Music by George Evans
- "A Life on the Ocean Wave"
  - Music by Henry Russell
- "Love Me, and the World Is Mine"
  - Music by Ernest Ball
  - Lyrics by Dave Reed Jr.
- "In the Shade of the Old Apple Tree"
  - Music by Egbert Van Alstyne
- "In My Merry Oldsmobile"
  - Music by Gus Edwards
- "Let the Rest of the World Go By"
  - Music by Ernest Ball
  - Lyrics by J. Keirn Brennan
- "When You Were Sweet Sixteen"
  - Written by James Thornton
- "The Bowery"
  - Music by Percy Gaunt

== Home media ==
Strawberry Blonde was released on both VHS and in a DVD edition through the Warner Archive Collection.
