= Heart of My Heart =

Song written by Ben Ryan

"The Gang That Sang Heart of My Heart" is a popular song. The music and lyrics were written by Ben Ryan (1892–1968) in 1926. It reminisces about being in a youthful quartet, singing "Heart of My Heart".

== History and origins ==
The quoted line, "Heart of My Heart", so longed for in the 1926 song, begins the chorus of "The Story of the Rose", written by Andrew Mack (1863–1931) in 1899. Mack was a popular American actor, singer and comedian who reportedly first sang this song in an 1899 show at the Academy of Music in New York City. The show was The Last of the Rohans, written and produced by Mack.

"The Story of the Rose" is a standard among barbershop quartets the world over. It is one of the most popular songs sung on Valentine's Day, when quartets deliver Singing Valentines to oft–unsuspecting recipients going about their lives in their homes, offices, classrooms, shops, train stops, and other places. In this context, the verses are usually omitted and only the chorus ("Heart of My Heart") is sung.

== Other versions ==
- A version of the popular 1926 song was recorded by The Four Aces, backed by the Jack Pleis Orchestra, on October 14, 1953, and was issued by Decca Records. It reached #7 on Billboard. Another version recorded by Don Cornell, Alan Dale, and Johnny Desmond also charted in 1953, reaching #10 on Billboard. In the United Kingdom, a version by Max Bygraves charted at #7.
- Bing Crosby included the song in a medley on his album Join Bing and Sing Along (1959)
- Other known versions of the song include recordings by Frankie Laine and Trini Lopez (who included it on his album Trini Lopez at PJ's Vol. 2).
- In 1977, Florence Henderson and Robert Reed performed the song during a medley on an episode of The Brady Bunch Variety Hour.
- Ben Ryan was also the co-writer with Jimmy Durante of Durante's signature song "Inka Dinka Doo" in 1933 and was, as well, a film actor and screenwriter.
- In 2005, the barbershop quartet Realtime won the Barbershop Harmony Society's International quartet championship with this version, arranged by Brent Graham.

== Cultural references ==
According to the book Grace and Power: The Private World of the Kennedy White House by Sally Bedell Smith, this song was a particular favorite of U.S. President John F. Kennedy; the book mentions that the president often asked his younger brother Teddy to sing it at family gatherings.

The music of "The Gang that Sang" was used for the 1954 French song "Plus je t'embrasse". The French lyrics, by Max François, bear no relation to the English lyrics. Jazz versions of "Plus je t'embrasse" have been recorded by Blossom Dearie and by Diana Panton.

In the Get Smart episode "Weekend Vampire," an attempt to reconstruct a tune heard just as a murder was committed led to an enthusiastic—if irrelevant—rendition of the 1926 song by Max, the Chief, and detect-o-tune operator Arrick (Roger Price).
