= Two Girls and a Sailor =

1944 film by Richard Thorpe

- Theatrical release poster
- Directed by: Richard Thorpe
- Written by: Richard Connell; Gladys Lehman
- Produced by: Joe Pasternak
- Starring: June Allyson; Gloria DeHaven; Van Johnson
- Cinematography: Robert Surtees
- Edited by: George Boemler
- Music by: Calvin Jackson; George Stoll
- Distributed by: Metro-Goldwyn-Mayer
- Release date: June 1944
- Running time: 124 minutes
- Country: United States
- Language: English
- Budget: $1.4 million
- Box office: $4.5 million

Two Girls and a Sailor is a 1944 American musical film directed by Richard Thorpe and starring Van Johnson, June Allyson and Gloria DeHaven. Set on the American homefront during World War II, it's about two singing sisters who create a lavish canteen to entertain members of the military, thanks to financial contributions from a mysterious donor. The picture features a host of celebrity performances, including Jimmy Durante doing his hallmark "Inka Dinka Doo", Gracie Allen (in her final film role), and Lena Horne. Richard Connell and Gladys Lehman were nominated for the Academy Award for Best Original Screenplay.

== Plot ==
Two sisters, Jean and Patsy Deyo, are born into a vaudeville family, and when they grow up, start an act themselves. One night, they invite a bunch of servicemen to their apartment. They are both attracted to a sailor named Johnny. Jean points out to Johnny an unused nearby warehouse they wish they could make into a canteen to entertain the troops.

An anonymous benefactor they call "Somebody" starts fulfilling that goal. First, a Mr. Nizby shows up and hands them the keys to the warehouse, announcing they now own it. As the two sisters explore the dusty building, they discover that Billy Kipp, an old vaudeville performer they knew as kids, has been squatting there ever since his wife left him and took their infant son many years ago. A horde of cleaners tidies up, and the place is made into an inviting canteen, all courtesy of "Somebody". Famous entertainers perform, as do Jean and Patsy.

Johnny starts dating Jean, unaware that Patsy is also in love with him. Meanwhile, Patsy tries to discover who "Somebody" is. Finally, she learns that he is none other than Johnny. Also, Johnny turns out to be in love with Patsy, and Jean with Sergeant Frank Miller, but both did not want to hurt the other. Everything gets straightened out in the end. To top it off, Billy spots a sailor who looks just like a younger version of himself, down to his nose. His son and he are joyfully reunited.

== Cast ==
- June Allyson as Patsy Deyo
- Gloria DeHaven as Jean Deyo
- Van Johnson as John Dyckman Brown III
- Tom Drake as Sergeant Frank Miller
- Henry Stephenson as John Dyckman Brown I
- Henry O'Neill as John Dyckman Brown II
- Frank Jenks as Dick Deyo
- Donald Meek as Mr. Nizby
- Harry James and his Music Makers as themselves
- Ben Blue as himself
- Carlos Ramírez as himself
- Albert Coates as himself
- Amparo Iturbi as herself
- José Iturbi as himself
- Jimmy Durante as Billy "Junior" Kipp
- Gracie Allen as herself
- Lena Horne as herself
- Virginia O'Brien as herself
- The Wilde Twins as themselves
- Helen Forrest as herself
- Xavier Cugat and His Orchestra as themselves
- Ava Gardner as the Dream Girl (uncredited)

== Soundtrack ==
- Overture
- Did You Ever Have the Feeling That You Wanted to Go? - Written and performed by Jimmy Durante
- Who Will Be with You When I'm Far Away - Performed, words, music by Jimmy Durante
- Sweet and Lovely - words music by Gus Arnheim, Harry Tobias, Jules Lemare - Performed by June Allyson (dubbed by Virginia Rees) and Gloria DeHaven (dubbed by Dorothy Jackson)
- A-Tisket, A-Tasket - words music by Al Feldman and Ella Fitzgerald - Performed by June Allyson and Gloria DeHaven
- Charmaine - by Erno Rapee and Lew Pollack - Performed by Harry James and His Music Makers
- A Love Like Ours - words by Mann Holiner, music by Alberta Nichols - Performed by June Allyson (dubbed by Virginia Rees) and Gloria DeHaven, with Harry James and His Music Makers
- Rumba Rumba - words by Sammy Gallop, music by José Pafumy - Performed by Lina Romay with Xavier Cugat and His Orchestra
- Granada - words music by Agustín Lara - Performed by Carlos Ramírez, with Xavier Cugat and His Orchestra
- Bim, Bam, Bum - Performed by Xavier Cugat and His Orchestra
- My Mother Told Me - Sung by Gloria DeHaven; later reprised by Van Johnson, Tom Drake and Frank Sully
- Estrellita - music by M. M. Ponce - Performed by Harry James and His Music Makers
- Take It Easy - words music by Al DeBru, Irving Taylor, Vic Mizzy - Performed by Virginia O'Brien, Lee Wilde, Lyn Wilde, and Lina Romay with Xavier Cugat and His Orchestra
- Thrill of a New Romance - Played by Xavier Cugat and His Orchestra. Danced by Ben Blue and Lina Romay
- Concerto for Index Finger - Performed on piano by Gracie Allen with orchestra, conducted by Albert Coates
- In A Moment of Madness - words by Ralph Freed, music by Jimmy McHugh - Sung by Helen Forrest, accompanied by Harry James and His Music Makers
- Flash - by Harry James
- The Young Man with a Horn - words by Ralph Freed, music by Georgie Stoll - Performed by June Allyson and Harry James and His Music Makers
- Anchors Aweigh - Performed by an unidentified marching band in the dream sequence
- You, Dear - words by Ralph Freed, music by Sammy Fain - Performed by Harry James and His Music Makers
- Babalú - words music by Margarita Lecuona - Performed by Lina Romay with Xavier Cugat and His Orchestra
- Inka Dinka Doo - words music by Jimmy Durante, Ben Ryan, Harry Donnelly - Performed by Jimmy Durante
- Ritual Fire Dance - by Manuel de Falla - Performed on pianos by José Iturbi and Amparo Iturbi
- Paper Doll - words music by Johnny S. Black - Performed by Lena Horne
- Medley (A Love Like Ours, The Young Man with a Horn, Sweet and Lovely) - Performed by Allyson, DeHaven with Harry James and His Music Makers

Source: IMDB

== Reception ==
According to MGM records, the film earned $2,852,000 in the US and Canada and $1,724,000 elsewhere, resulting in a profit of $1,726,000.

The film is recognized by American Film Institute in these lists:

- 2004: AFI's 100 Years...100 Songs:
  - "Inka Dinka Doo" – Nominated
