= The Chipmunk Songbook =

Studio album by Alvin and the Chipmunks
- Released: January 1, 1962
- Genre: Children's
- Length: 32:10
- Label: Capitol / Liberty
- Producer: Ross Bagdasarian

Alvin and the Chipmunks chronology
The Alvin Show (1961)	The Chipmunk Songbook (1962)	Christmas with The Chipmunks (1962)

Singles from The Chipmunk Songbook
- 1. "The Alvin Twist" Released: 1962

Professional ratings
Review scores
Source	Rating
Allmusic	3/5 stars

The Chipmunk Songbook is an album by Alvin and the Chipmunks with David Seville. It was released on January 1, 1962, by Capitol / Liberty

In 1986, a two-record compilation album was released by Capitol-EMI America, By Capitol Records, Inc. also titled The Chipmunk Songbook, but featuring an entirely different track listing, consisting of songs taken from various albums from the 1960s.

== Track listing (1962 release) ==
=== Side one ===
1. "The Band Played On" (John F. Palmer, Charles B. Ward) – 2:33
2. "Buffalo Gals" [featuring June Foray] (John Hodges, arr. Ross Bagdasarian, Sr.) – 3:28
3. "The Alvin Twist" (Ross Bagdasarian, Sr.) – 2:40
4. "Funiculì, Funiculà" (Luigi Denza, Edward Oxenford) – 2:23
5. "My Wild Irish Rose" (Chauncey Olcott) – 2:43
6. "Down in the Valley" (Traditional, arr. Ross Bagdasarian, Sr.) – 3:08
7. "Git Along Little Dogies" (Traditional, arr. Ross Bagdasarian, Sr.) – 3:09

=== Side two ===
1. "Twinkle, Twinkle, Little Star" (Jane Taylor, Wolfgang Amadeus Mozart) – 3:34
2. "On Top of Old Smoky" [featuring June Foray] (Traditional, arr. Ross Bagdasarian, Sr.) – 3:29
3. "The Man on the Flying Trapeze" (George Leybourne, Gaston Lyle, Alfred Lee) – 3:05
4. "Strolling Through the Park One Day" (Ed Haley) – 2:08
5. "Polly Wolly Doodle" (Dan Emmett) – 3:21
6. "Bicycle Built for Two" [featuring June Foray] (Harry Dacre) – 3:05
7. "America the Beautiful" (Katharine Lee Bates, Samuel A. Ward) – 2:07

All songs were featured on The Alvin Show.
