= Singing Valentines =

Singing Valentines is the name for a fundraising program that is popular with barbershop choruses in the U.S., Canada and Australia. The delivery of Singing Valentines is usually done by a barbershop quartet from a chapter affiliated with the three major International barbershop societies:

- Barbershop Harmony Society
- Sweet Adelines International
- Harmony, Incorporated

This is not a variation on the singing telegram since the message is not dictated by the sender. Rather, quartets usually deliver a canned package of one or two barbershop songs with a personalized card and either roses or chocolates.

== Song selection ==
Each chapter is free to choose their music. For male barbershop chapters, the typical two song selection is:

- Heart of My Heart, I Love You (the chorus from the Story of the Rose), and
- Let Me Call You Sweetheart

There are standard barbershop arrangements for these two songs from the Barbershop Harmony Society collection of twelve polecat songs (that society members are encouraged to learn).

The female barbershop societies do not suggest particular songs for chapters to use in this fundraiser.

== Logistics ==
Some of the larger choruses can field enough quartets to deliver as many as 200 Singing Valentines in two days, usually on the February 13 and 14. Often, deliveries to assisted living facilities or nursing homes can be scheduled for the weekend.

== Other Singing Valentines ==
Although the delivery of Singing Valentines is typically done by a barbershop quartet, other a cappella singing ensembles have been known to set up similar fundraising programs, particularly on college campuses.

On every February 14 since 2011, the Canadian bilingual magazine La Scena Musicale / The Music Scene offers an annual Singing Valentines, a unique romantic one-to-one experience delivered by trained solo opera singers at the request of the sender to their loved one. This Valentine's Day gift is now done by telephone, personalized recorded video, or other video and audio platforms such as Zoom and FaceTime. Different genres are performed, from opera arias to standard love songs to musicals and art songs. During the COVID-19 pandemic, La Scena Musicale has extended the service to CORONA Serenades and Mother's Day serenades.

There is a reference to Singing Valentines in chapter thirteen of Harry Potter and the Chamber of Secrets.
