= Joan Brickhill =

South African actress

- Born: Joan Brickhill; 6 March 1924; Durban, Union of South Africa (present-day South Africa)
- Died: 15 January 2014 (aged 89); Johannesburg, South Africa
- Occupations: Actress, producer
- Spouse: Louis Burke

Joan Brickhill (6 March 1924 – 15 January 2014) was a South African actress and choreographer who worked in radio, theatre, film, and television. Together with her husband, Louis Burke, she founded Brickhill-Burke Productions, which produced Meet Me in St. Louis on Broadway in 1990 and received four Tony Award nominations, including Best Choreography for Brickhill.

== Career ==
Brickhill was a child prodigy, making her stage debut at two. She later worked as a drama teacher. Her first feature film was Nor the Moon by Night (1958), in which she played the leading role, Harriet Carver. Follow That Rainbow (1979) was her second feature film. She directed and presented, with her husband, Louis Burke, the first South African play in KwaZulu-Natal to be performed for multiracial audiences. She also worked as an executive entertainment producer at Sun City.

== Death ==
Joan Brickhill died at age 89 in Johannesburg on 15 January 2014 from undisclosed causes.
