= Meet Me in St. Louis (novel) =

1942 novel by Sally Benson

First edition

Meet Me in St. Louis is a 1942 novel by Sally Benson. It is the basis for the Academy Award-nominated musical film Meet Me in St. Louis (1944).

== Background ==
The stories comprising the novel were originally written as eight vignettes in a series, 5135 Kensington, published by The New Yorker magazine from June 14, 1941 to May 23, 1942. Benson collected the eight and added four more to create a book-length portrait of the large Smith family living in a Kensington Avenue house in St. Louis at the start of the 20th century. The novel is sometimes referred to as "The Kensington Stories". Each chapter corresponds to a month during the twelve-month period from June 1903 to May 1904, when the St. Louis World's Fair opened.

When Random House published Benson's book in 1942, the title was taken from the planned MGM film, which at the time was in the early stages of screenwriting. MGM hired Benson to develop a screenplay adaptation, but her screenplay ended up not being used, and she only received a "based on the novel by" film credit.

== Contents ==
Although the novel and film have many differences, there are chapters that mirror what viewers of the film are familiar with. For example, in the "June 1903" chapter, the Smith's eldest daughter Rose is waiting for a rare and expensive long-distance telephone call from one of her suitors, John Shepard, who is in New York City. Rose believes there is a chance he might propose to her. The entire Smith family and their maid Katie pretend not to be eavesdropping, but are intensely curious as Rose takes the call in the downstairs parlor. She feels "eight pairs of eyes at her back." She has to shout into the phone to be heard and grows impatient with John's procrastinating remarks about the weather. She ends the call abruptly before any proposal can occur.

The "December 1903" chapter describes the youngest daughter Tootie's anticipation of Christmas. The oldest Smith child, Lon, is home for the holidays from Princeton University. His sisters Rose and Esther scheme to ensure that at the Smith-hosted Christmas party, Lon gets to dance every dance with Lucille Pintard, whom he has a crush on.

In the "April 1904" chapter, Mr. Smith tells his family that his employer is offering him a promotion to work in the company's New York office. He wants to accept the offer, but his family members rebel at the idea of being uprooted, and he reluctantly agrees to remain in St. Louis.

== Reception ==
When the Kensington stories started appearing in The New Yorker, they attracted large volumes of fan mail, and Benson received rising paychecks from the magazine as new installments were published. After the final story was printed in May 1942 and the book was in preparation, literary critic John T. Frederick praised the humor in Benson's work, calling it "an appreciative, joyous recognition of the comic elements in people and life—free from malice, free from meanness." He added that her recreation of past experience included "real people, lively incidents, and richly realized atmosphere—a combination that appeals to young and old."

Over 80 years later when Meet Me in St. Louis was long out of print, New York Times Book Review editor Sadie Stein wrote an appreciation of the novel. She said that in addition to the in-jokes, antics, and rivalries among the Smith children:

There's quite a lot of light-touch poignancy, too – financial worries and small heartaches that don't make it into Vincente Minnelli's film, and the truly touching relationships between Grandpa and the younger children. This is Benson's love letter to her childhood and a vanished time, but it's also smart, sharp and funny. I realized, when I put the book down, that my face actually ached from smiling.

== Other adaptations ==
- A 1959 version of Benson's novel was produced for television, starring Jane Powell, Jeanne Crain, Patty Duke, Walter Pidgeon, Ed Wynn, Tab Hunter and Myrna Loy. It was directed by George Schaefer from the original Brecher and Finklehoffe screenplay.
- The novel was adapted again for television in 1966. This was a non-musical half-hour situation comedy (including laugh track) starring Shelley Fabares, Celeste Holm, Larry Merrill, Judy Land, Reta Shaw and Morgan Brittany. It was directed by Alan D. Courtney from a script written by Benson herself. This was to be a pilot for a TV series, but no network picked it up.
- A Broadway musical based on the film was produced in 1989, with additional songs.
