= K-K-K-Katy =

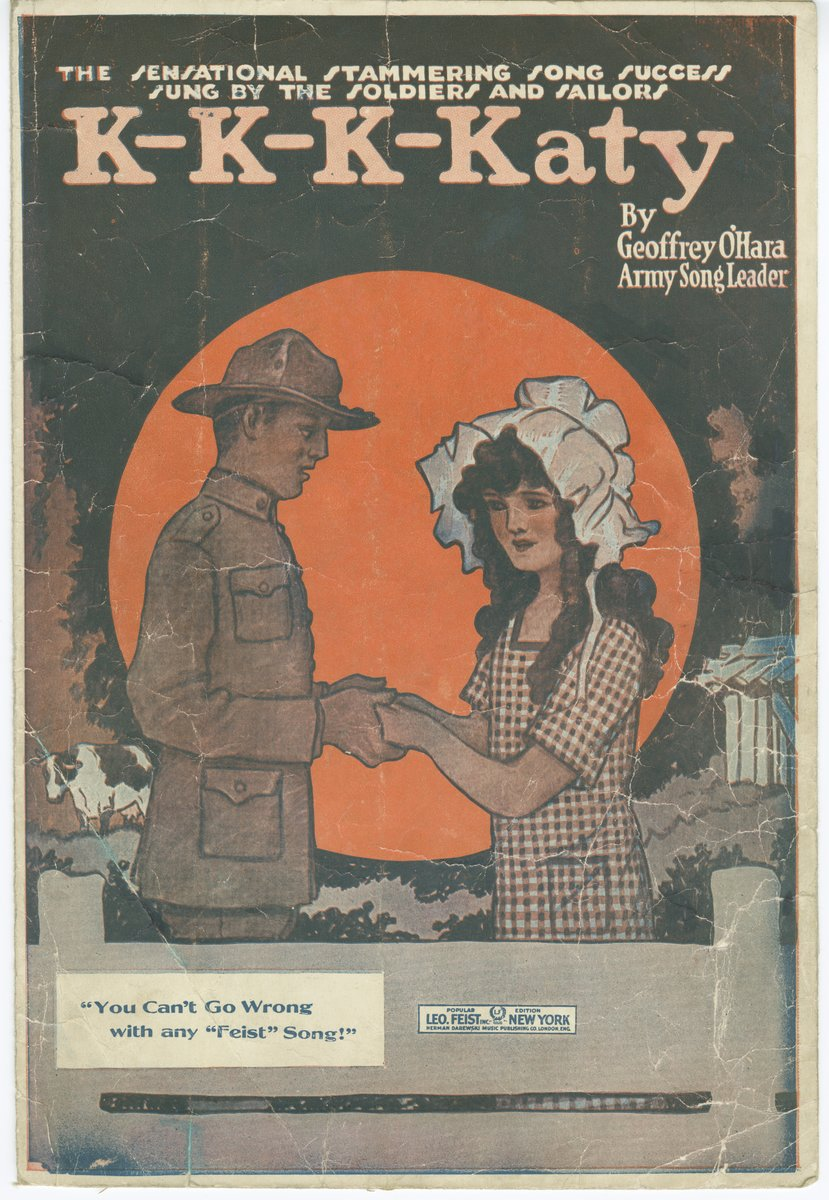
- Sheet music cover

Song
- Written: 1917
- Published: 1918
- Songwriter: Geoffrey O'Hara

"K-K-K-Katy" is a World War I-era song written by Canadian-American composer Geoffrey O'Hara in 1917 and published in 1918. The sheet music advertised it as "The Sensational Stammering Song Success Sung by the Soldiers and Sailors", as well as "The Sensational New Stammering Song" The song was first played at a garden party fund-raiser for the Red Cross in Collins Bay on Lake Ontario. O'Hara was from Chatham, Ontario, and taught music at several universities.

The lyrics tell of a brave but stuttering soldier called Jimmy who is lovesick over the beautiful Katy. He buys a wedding ring before going to fight in France. The inspiration for the "Katy" of the song was Katherine Craig Richardson of Kingston, Ontario. She was a friend of O'Hara's sister, and her parents recall O'Hara writing the song in their living room.

K-K-K-Katy
Performed by Billy Murray, recorded in 1918

== Chorus ==
K-K-K-K-Katy, beautiful Katy
You're the only g-g-g-g-girl that I adore
When the M-M-M-Moon shines over the c-c-c-cowshed
I'll be waiting at the k-k-k-kitchen door.

== Early performances and commercial success ==
"K-K-K-Katy" was a top 20 song from May 1918 to January 1919 and was number 1 from July to September. It was recorded by Billy Murray on March 8, 1918 and released on Victor 18455. Arthur Fields, under the Eugene Buckley pseudonym, also recorded a version of the song. The sheet music was heavily reprinted. A version titled "K-K-K-Klanswoman," with altered lyrics, was published in a "Song Book For Women of the Ku Klux Klan," c.1924. In the late 60s, Mad Magazine had a version called "ca-ca-ca-cooties". A Second World War official Army song book had a song "K-k-k-K.P."

The song made a comeback during World War II, when songs from World War I became popular at military training camps. "K-K-K-Katy" was one of many songs brought to the front by officers who had heard this song while on leave in England. Older songs such as "K-K-K-Katy" were often preferred over modern songs.

The song was covered by Mel Blanc (in his Porky Pig voice) and the Sportsmen Quartet in 1951. The song appears on the compilation album Mel Blanc: The Man of 1000 Voices 2007. Bing Crosby included the song in a medley on his album Join Bing and Sing Along (1959)

== Later performances and parodies ==
The song was the basis of a parody which ridiculed the Ku Klux Klan, a white supremacist organization in the United States often referred to by its acronym, KKK.

Additionally, the political-humor group Capitol Steps performed a parody of this song entitled "K-K-Kuwaitis", about the 1990 invasion of Kuwait which began the Gulf War. The song was released on their 1990 album Sheik, Rattle & Roll!

The "Yriekay" movement of P.D.Q. Bach's Missa Hilarious includes a section with the text "K-K-K-Kyrie eleison", in reference to this song.

Bradford Dillman's character in The Way We Were heckles Barbra Streisand's character, Young Communist League member Katie Morosky, with "K-K-K-Katie, be my K-K-K-Comrade" in a pre-World War II campus peace rally during the 1973 film.
