= The Band Played On =

Popular 1895 song

"The Band Played On", also known (by its refrain) as "Casey Would Waltz with a Strawberry Blonde", is a song that was written in 1895 with lyrics by John F. Palmer and music by Charles B. Ward.

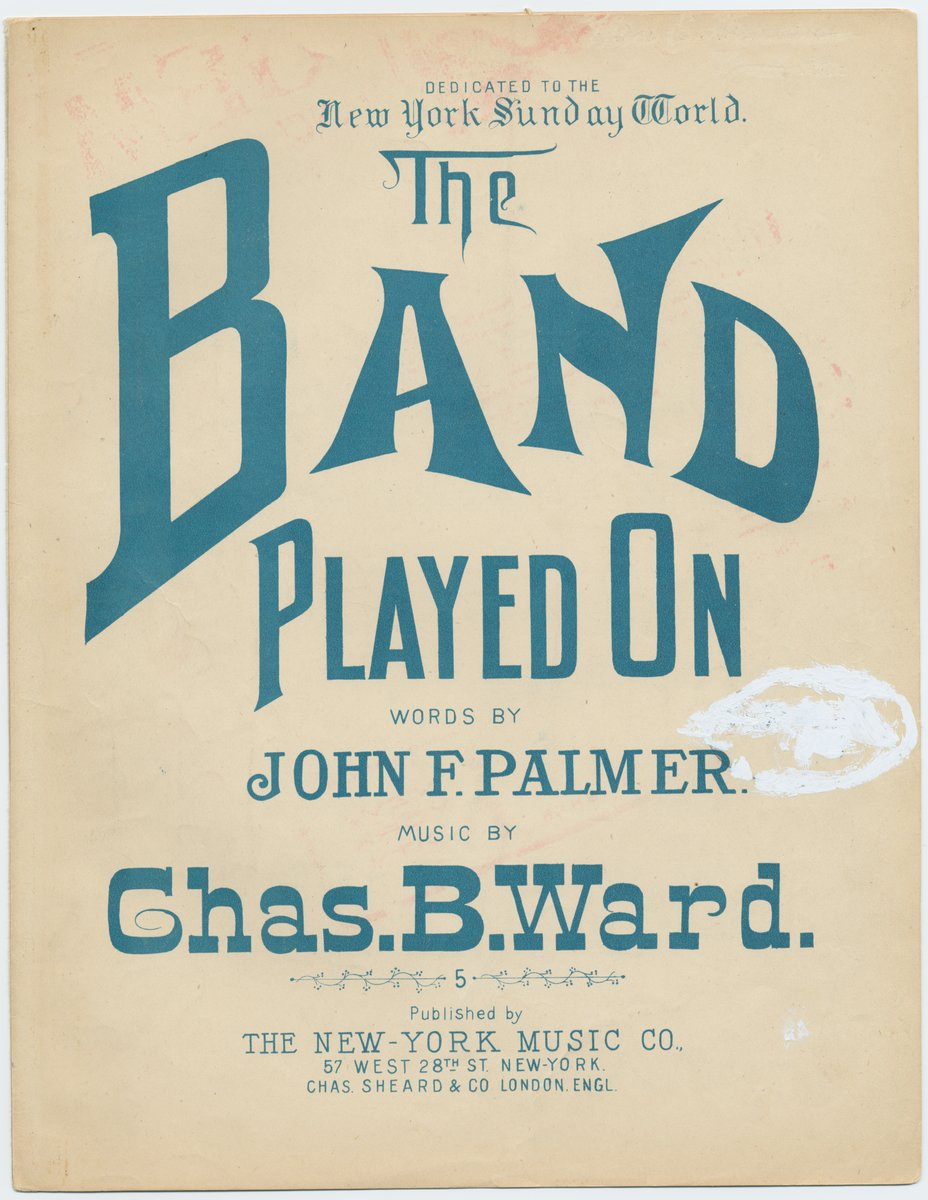
Sheet music cover

Unusually, as originally published the verses are in 2/4 time, while the chorus is in 3/4 (waltz) time. The chorus is much better known than the verses to later generations.

The lyrics of the refrain:

Casey would waltz with a strawberry blonde
And the band played on.
He'd glide 'cross the floor with the girl he adored
And the band played on.
But his brain was so loaded it nearly exploded;
The poor girl would shake with alarm.
He'd ne'er leave the girl with the strawberry curls
And the band played on.

The song became a pop standard with many recordings made. One of the first was by Dan W. Quinn for Berliner Gramophone in 1895, the same year the song was published.

The song was later featured in many films, including Raoul Walsh's The Strawberry Blonde (1941), the title of which was inspired by the lyrics, and Alfred Hitchcock's Strangers on a Train (1951).

== Cover versions ==
One of the most famous recordings, by Guy Lombardo's orchestra (vocal by Kenny Gardner and the Lombardo Trio), was made on February 26, 1941, and issued by Decca Records as catalog number 3675 (reissued as number 25341), coinciding with the release of the film The Strawberry Blonde, in which the song appeared. It first reached the Billboard magazine Best Seller chart on May 9, 1941, and lasted 4 weeks on the chart, peaking at #6. The Guy Lombardo version included only the famous chorus, omitting the 2/4-time verses.

The numerous other recordings of the number include: Frank D'Rone - a single release as "The Strawberry Blonde" (this reached the UK charts in 1960, peaking at No. 24); Connie Francis - for her album Sing Along with Connie Francis (1961); Alvin and the Chipmunks in the 1962 album The Chipmunk Songbook; Bing Crosby who included the song in a medley on his album On the Sentimental Side (1962); Alice Faye - for the album Alice Faye Sings Her Greatest Movie Hits (1962); and Mandy Patinkin - for his album Mandy Patinkin (1989).
