= The Fountain in the Park =

Song by Ed Haley, published 1884

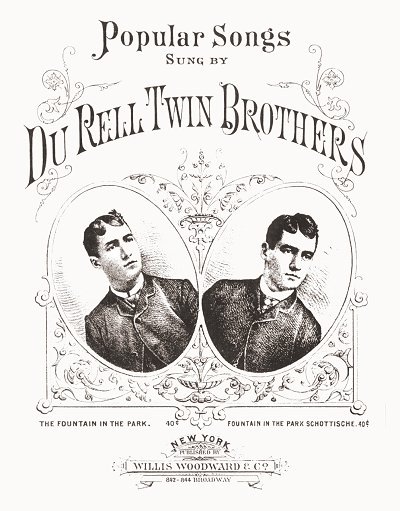
"The Fountain in the Park" sheet music cover.

"The Fountain in the Park", also known as "While Strolling Through (or Thru') the Park One Day", is a song by Ed Haley, a member of the vaudeville act the Haley Brothers. Some authors believe the song was written by Robert A. Keiser, to whom Haley dedicated the song. The song was published in 1884 by Willis Woodward & Co. of New York, but dates from about 1880. It is best known for the lyric "While strolling through the park one day, in the merry merry month of May," and has been featured in numerous films, including Strike Up the Band (1940), in which it was sung by Judy Garland.

As early as 1938, Shep Fields and his Rippling Rhythm Orchestra recorded the song as a Swing Jazz fox trot entitled In the Merry Month of May for Bluebird Records (#B-7606, 1938) featuring the young concert accordionist John Serry Sr.

Bing Crosby included the song in a medley on his album 101 Gang Songs (1961).

Eugene Cernan and Harrison Schmitt singing "The Fountain in the Park" on the Moon during the 1972 Apollo 17 mission

== Apollo 17 ==
A few bars of "The Fountain in the Park" were sung on the Moon by NASA Astronauts Harrison Schmitt and Eugene Cernan on the Apollo 17 mission. Schmitt started by singing "I was strolling on the Moon one day..." when Cernan joined in. Cernan kept with the original "merry month of May", however, while Schmitt sang "December", which was the actual date at the time. After a brief debate, Schmitt resumed, singing "When much to my surprise, a pair of bonny eyes..." before humming the notes instead. Moments later, Capsule Communicator Robert A. Parker cut in from Houston, punning "sorry about that, guys, but today may be December."

External audio
- You may hear the tune "In the Merry Month of May" performed by the Shep Fields Rippling Rhythm Orchestra with the accordionist John Serry Sr. in 1938 Here on DAHR

== Film ==
- The Hollywood Revue of 1929 (1929)
- Caught Plastered (1931)
- The House on 56th Street (1933)
- This Is My Affair (1937)
- Idiot's Delight (1939)
- The Ice Follies of 1939 (1939)
- Strike Up the Band (1940)
- The Strawberry Blonde (1941)
- Unexpected Uncle (1941)
- Yankee Doodle Dandy (1942)
- Gentleman Jim (1942)
- Strolling Thru the Park (short with three couples dancing to the tune) (1943)
- Heaven Can Wait (1943)
- Show Business (1944)
- Lake Placid Serenade (1944)
- Her Highness and the Bellboy (1945)
- I Wonder Who's Kissing Her Now (1947)
- April Showers (1948)
- Storm over Wyoming (1950)
- Mr. Belvedere Rings the Bell (1951)
- Million Dollar Mermaid (1952)
- The FBI Story (1959)
- Arabesque (1966)
- Oh! What a Lovely War (1969)

== TV and animation ==
- Mickey Mouse short The Nifty Nineties
- Tom and Jerry short Baby Puss
- Bugs Bunny shorts Elmer's Pet Rabbit, and Bushy Hare
- Pepé Le Pew shorts Scentimental Romeo and Heaven Scent
- I Love Lucy episode "Pioneer Women".
- The Simpsons episodes "Treehouse of Horror III" and "Brother's Little Helper"
- Shining Time Station episode "Schemer's Robot"
- The Magic School Bus episodes "Inside Ralphie" and "Goes to Seed"
- The Real Ghostbusters episode "Very Beast Friends"
- Alvin and the Chipmunks covered the song for their 1962 album The Chipmunk Songbook
- Top Cat episode "The Missing Heir"
- The Flintstones episode "The Hot Piano"
- The Honeymooners episode "Life Upon the Wicked Stage"
- Used as background music in the Animaniacs episode "Potty Emergency"
- Sabrina: The Animated Series episode "Xabrina: Warrior Princess"
- Used instrumentally as a leitmotif whenever the eccentric old gentleman would unexpectedly appear in the Merrie Melodies short The Dover Boys (1942)
- Cassie in Dragon Tales from the episode "I Believe in Me" (from the first half of "I Believe in Me/Bye-Bye Baby Birdie") which was on Season 2 (though she calls it While Strolling Dragon Land One Day; which is sung to the tune of this song) (2001)
- Kermit the Frog in Muppets Tonight (Episode 203: Heather Locklear)
- The Dover Boys at Pimento University
