= Over the Top: Military March =

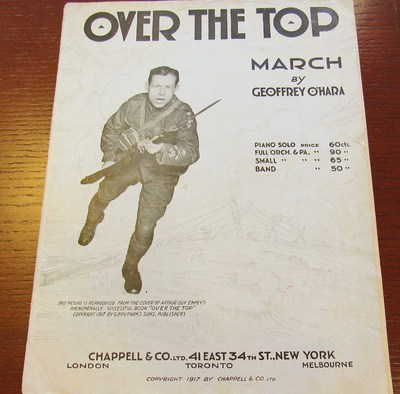
- Sheet music cover

Song
- Released: 1917
- Label: Chappell & Co., Ltd.
- Composer(s): Geoffrey O'Hara

Over the Top: Military March is a World War I era song released in 1917. Geoffrey O'Hara composed the music. The song was published by Chappell & Co., Ltd. of New York, New York. On the cover, there is a picture of Arthur Guy Empey, charging with a rifle. In the background, there are soldiers and barbed wire. It is written for piano.

The sheet music can be found at Pritzker Military Museum & Library.
