= Donna Kane =

American theater actress (born 1962)

- Born: August 12, 1962 (age 64); Beacon, New York

Donna Kane is an American theater actress. Born in Beacon, New York, she grew up on Long Island and in Wayne, New Jersey, where she won Miss Teenage New Jersey in 1976, and was first runner-up for America's Junior Miss 1980. She was the recipient of the 1986 Theatre World Award for her off-Broadway portrayal of Ruby in Dames at Sea. Kane had her Broadway debut in 1989 in Meet Me in St. Louis, playing the role of Esther. She has won acclaim for her performances in the 1995 U.S. tour of Joseph and the Amazing Technicolor Dreamcoat with Donny Osmond, Les Misérables on Broadway (January 12 – August 14, 1993), and as Maria in West Side Story in Vienna and Munich (1995).

Kane received her B.A. in political science from Mount Holyoke College in 1984. She married Mark Staples, an oil trader, in 1986.
