= Meet Me in St. Louis, Louis =

1904 song by Kerry Mills and Andrew Sterling

"Meet Me In St. Louis, Louis"
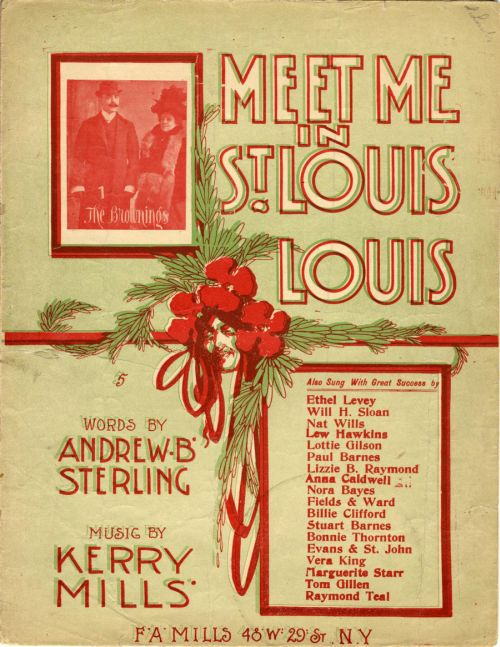
- Cover, sheet music, 1904

Song
- Language: English
- Published: 1904
- Composer: Kerry Mills
- Lyricist: Andrew B. Sterling

"Meet Me in St. Louis, Louis" is a popular song from 1904 on the occurrence of the St. Louis World's Fair which celebrated the Louisiana Purchase Exposition. The words are by Andrew B. Sterling; the music by Kerry Mills. The song was published in 1904 in New York by Mills's firm, F. A. Mills. It was recorded that year by many artists, including William F. Denny, Billy Murray and Arthur Collins.

The song and the fair were focal points of the Judy Garland movie Meet Me in St. Louis. Garland recorded the song in 1944. Bing Crosby included the song in a medley on his 1959 album Join Bing and Sing Along .

== Overview ==
"Louis" in the song is pronounced "LOO-ee", akin to the French. The song is one of the few instances of pronouncing the city's name that way. It is normally pronounced "LOO-iss".

The song, which is generally styled in the form of a limerick, has many and varied verses, few of which are remembered today — unlike the chorus. In the original sheet music, the chorus is the same for the first two verses but varies in verses three through six, which are essentially jokes with the punch line in the chorus.

== In popular culture ==
The song was also featured in the film The Strawberry Blonde with James Cagney and Olivia de Havilland, some four years prior to Meet Me in St. Louis.

The song is played at the home games of the St. Louis Cardinals and St. Louis Blues.
