= Geoffrey O'Hara =

Canadian-American composer, singer and music professor (1882–1967)

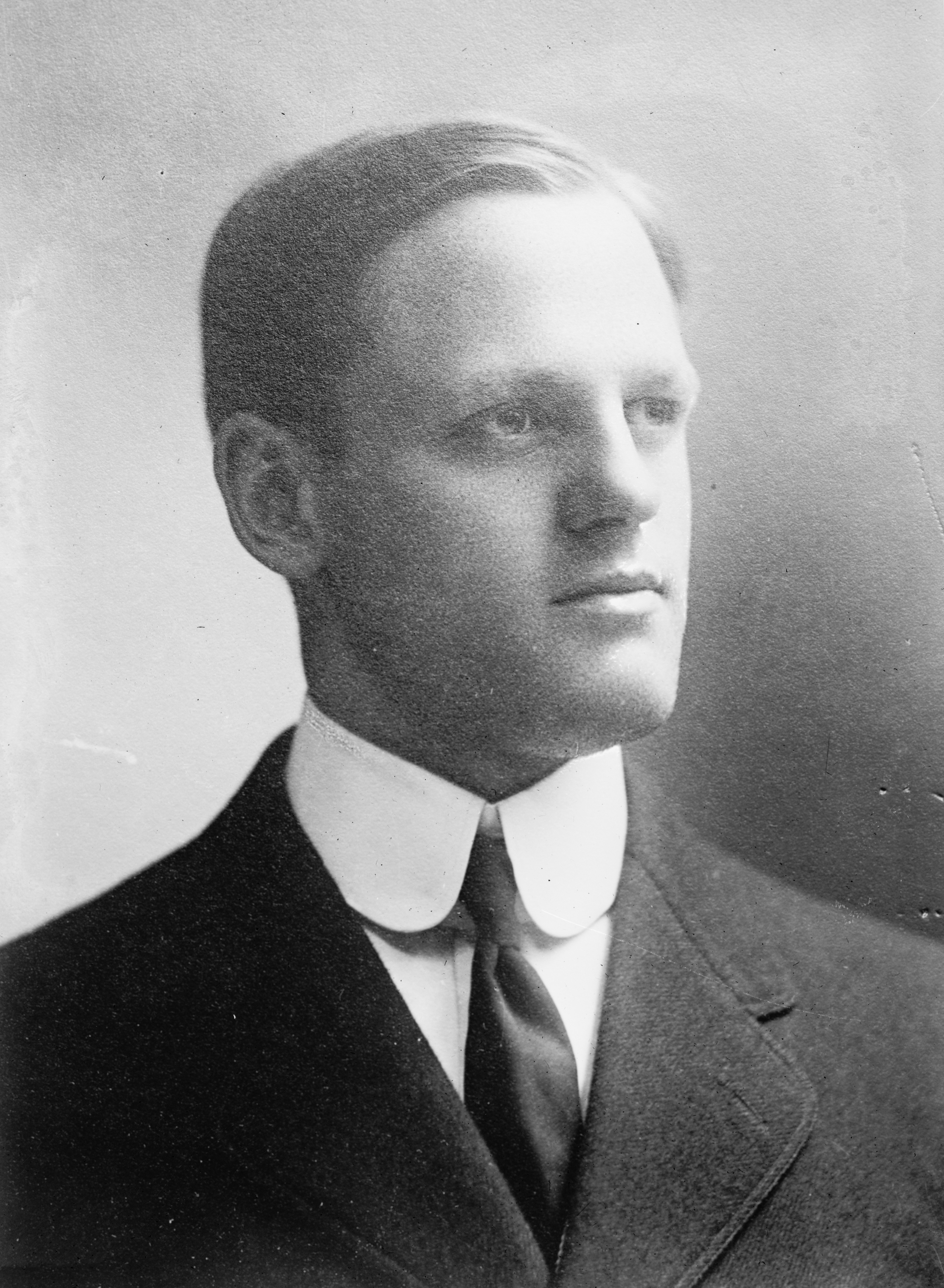
- Born: February 2, 1882; Chatham, Ontario
- Died: January 31, 1967 (aged 84); St. Petersburg, Florida, U.S.
- Occupations: Canadian-American composer, singer and music professor.

Geoffrey O'Hara (February 2, 1882 – January 31, 1967) was a Canadian-American composer, singer and music professor.

== Early life ==
O'Hara was born in Chatham, Ontario, Canada. He initially planned a military career. O'Hara entered the Royal Military College of Canada in Kingston, Ontario at age 18 and he trained with the 1st Hussars. He had to abandon his military career upon the death of his father, Robert O'Hara.

== Career ==
He moved to the United States in 1904, the same year he began performing in Vaudeville. He began recording for Edison Records in 1905. In 1913 O'Hara undertook the recording of traditional Indian songs on behalf of the American government. He was recorded on phonograph cylinder lecturing about the complexity of the music as well as singing and playing several types of Navajo traditional songs in 1914. During World War I, he was a singing instructor of patriotic songs for American troops.

O'Hara lectured on music and songwriting and held positions at Teachers' College of Columbia University (1936–37), Huron College and the University of South Dakota, where he later received an honorary Doctor of Music degree in 1947. He lectured for the remainder of his life. In 1920, O'Hara helped organize The Composers' and Lyric Writers' Protective League. He also was a board member of the American Society of Composers, Authors, and Publishers (ASCAP), was the president of the Composers-Authors Guild, and served in the United Service Organizations (USO).

He was a National Patron of Delta Omicron, an international professional music fraternity.

== Personal life ==
In 1919, he married Constance Dougherty from Massachusetts, and together they had two children; the same year, he became a naturalized citizen of the United States.

== Works ==
O'Hara composed over 500 popular and patriotic songs, and hymns. He had some moderate popular music hits in the 1910s with songs such as Your Eyes Have Told Me What I Did Not Know (1913), Tennessee, I Hear You Calling Me (1914), The Old Songs, and Over the Top: Military March (1917).

His one huge hit was his song K-K-K-Katy (1918), one of the most popular tunes of the World War I era. It was sung in both World War I and World War II, occasionally as "K. K. K. K. P."

He was commissioned by the Wilson administration to compose the modern day version of the Star Spangled Banner.

== Songs ==
- 1917 Give A Man A Horse He Can Ride, Lyrics by James Thomson
- 1917 Give Three Loud Cheers with Samuel Stewart, Lyrics by Edith M. Gibbs
- 1917 Over The Top March
- 1917 Send Me A Curl
- 1917 Woman Who Waits At Home, The, Lyrics by Gordon Johnstone
- 1918 Aw Sammie!, Lyrics by H.Sanborn
- 1918 I Don't Care Where They Send Me, Lyrics by Schuyler Green
- 1918 I Love The Merry Merry Sunshine with Francis Wheeler
- 1918 K-K-K-Katy
- 1918 Over Yonder Where The Lilies Grow
- 1918 Patriotism, Lyrics by William Horatio Day
- 1918 South Will Do Her Part, The, Lyrics by H. Sanborn
- 1919 Buddie Boy (How's Ev'ry Little Thing With You?) with Theodore Morse
- 1919 There Is No Death, Lyrics by Gordon Johnstone
- 1919 Two Little Stars, Lyrics by T.E.B. Henry
- 1920 Get Up And Get Out, Lyrics by Gordon Johnstone
- 1925 Out Of The West, Lyrics by Gordon Johnstone
- 1928 Grace Before Meals, Lyrics by Medomak Camp Boys
- 1931 God's Other Room, Lyrics by Katharine Bainbridge
- 1931 There's A Light In The Window
- 1931 Somewhere In The World
- 1931 One More Song For Jesus, Lyrics by Ina Duley Ogdon
- 1931 At The Rainbow's End
- 1931 Let Him In
- 1931 Drop A Little Letter In Your Heart
- 1940 Nebraska, We'll Fight For You!, Lyrics by Hale C. Cole
- 1942 Today Is Mine, Lyrics by Ina Duley Ogdon
- 1942 Never Bite Off Any More Than You Can Chew
- 1942 Limericks, Lyrics by Gelett Burgess

== Accolades ==
In 2024 O'Hara was posthumously inducted into the Chatham-Kent Cultural Hall of Fame for his contributions to music.

== See also ==
- Music of Canada
- List of Canadian composers
