= Inka Dinka Doo =

1933 popular song first performed by Jimmy Durante and written by Ben Ryan

"Inka Dinka Doo" is a 1933 popular song whose words were written by Ben Ryan, and whose music was composed by James Francis "Jimmy" Durante.

== Background ==
The song debuted in the 1934 movie Palooka, a film about the comics character Joe Palooka. By 1934, Durante's recording of the song was a major hit record, and it became Durante's theme song for the rest of his life. When he performed it on his radio and television programs, Durante would frequently interrupt it with the line "STOP da music, everybody!" He performed it again in the 1944 film Two Girls and a Sailor, which starred Van Johnson, June Allyson and Gloria DeHaven.

== Other recordings ==
In 1950, Sammy Davis Jr. recorded a unique version of the song, in which he impersonated various musical artists of the time. He released this as his debut record, along with "Laura".

Other artists who have recorded this song include Chet Atkins, Herb Ellis, Ray Brown, Jimmie Noone, Ronnie Aldrich, Ray Anthony, Ann-Margret, and John Lithgow.

== Sources ==
- Bakish, David (March 7, 2007). Jimmy Durante: His Show Business Career, with an Annotated Filmography and Discography. McFarland. ISBN 9780786430222 – via Google Books.
- Fowler, Gene Jr. Schnozzola: The Story of Jimmy Durante. Viking Press, 1951
- Bakish, David. Jimmy Durante: His Show Business Career, with an Annotated Filmography and Discography/ McFarland & Co., 1994. ISBN 978-0-89950-968-6
