= In the Shade of the Old Apple Tree =

1905 song written by Harry Williams and Egbert Van Alstyne

"In the Shade of the Old Apple Tree" is a popular song dating from 1905. It was written by Harry Williams and Egbert Van Alstyne (music). Popular recordings in 1905 were by Henry Burr; Albert Campbell; Haydn Quartet; and by Arthur Pryor's Band. Other recordings were by Duke Ellington (Brunswick 6646, recorded August 15, 1933), Louis Armstrong and The Mills Brothers (Decca 1495, recorded June 29, 1937) and Alma Cogan (1962). Bing Crosby included the song in a medley on his album On the Sentimental Side (1962).

The meter of its chorus is in the form of a Limerick.

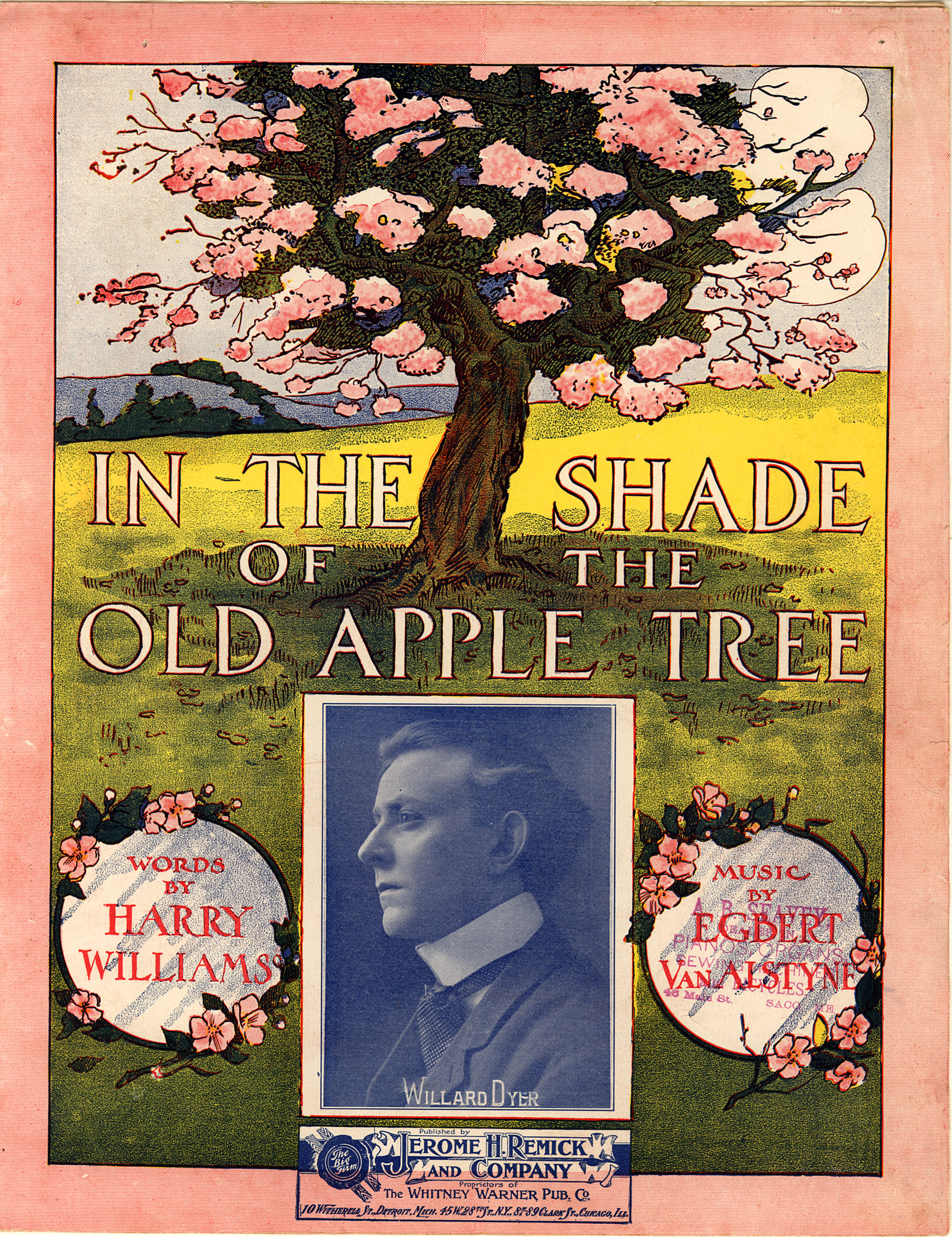
1905 sheet music cover

It can safely be characterized as a highly sentimental tune. Although the verses (seldom heard nowadays) provide further explanation, it is clear that the writer is singing about a lost love:

In the shade of the old apple tree,
Where the love in your eyes I could see,
Where the voice that I heard,
Like the song of a bird,
Seemed to whisper sweet music to me,

I could hear the dull buzz of the bee
In the blossoms as you said to me,
"With a heart that is true,
"I'll be waiting for you,
In the shade of the old apple tree."

== Other uses ==
This song is used in the 1930 Screen Song of the same name.

In the movie The Wizard of Oz, in the scene involving the talking apple trees who become angry with Dorothy for picking apples off them, the strains of this song are heard in the instrumental underscore.

Similarly, in Warner Bros. cartoons, for example, the tune was invoked in underscore sometimes, when trees were appearing on the screen. The song is most heavily featured in the Merrie Melodies short The Night Watchman (1938), where a full chorus from the song is performed by three rats.

In the movie Blondie in Society (1941), a scene involves Blondie (Penny Singleton) singing the song to their Great Dane showdog.

In the TV series adaptation of Sumo Do, Sumo Don't (2022) on Disney+, a rendition of this tune is sung over the closing credits, and various instrumental versions are played during the episodes.

== Parody ==
A song like this, dripping with sentiment even by early-1900s standards, lent itself to parodies. Billy Murray recorded one. The verse describes him passing by the house of Maggie Jones, a maiden "homelier than me", who asks him to fetch some apples on the promise of giving him one of the pies she plans to bake. That verse continues into the chorus:

So I climbed up the old apple tree,
For a pie was a real thing to me.
She stood down below
With her apron spread "so"
To catch all the apples, you see.

It looked like a picnic for me,
But just then the limb broke; holy gee!
And I broke seven bones
And half-killed Maggie Jones
In the shade of the old apple tree.

Ramblin' Jack Elliott recorded a parody version entitled "Shade of the Old Apple Tree," included on his 1964 album Jack Elliott:

It was only yesterday I thought I'd take a bath in some water
For a bath I hadn't had in goodness knows when
And for that bath I didn't want to pay a quarter
So I run down to the creek and jumped right in.
I hung my clothes upon an apple tree limb
'Twas there I got into an awful fix
When an old maid come down down and set beside them
And there she sat from one o'clock to six.

(Chorus:) In the shade of the old apple tree
I was in water right up to my knee
I had to lay down while she was around
'Til only my nose you could see
Mosquitoes was biting my nose
And the crawdads was nibbling my toes
I lay there all day 'til she went away
From the shade of the old apple tree.

(Spoken:) Here comes the pitiful part, boys and girls.

It was only yesterday that Jane and I got hitched
You bet your life I was a happy groom
There was only one thing that filled my heart with sadness
Was parts of her were scattered all over the room.
Her glass eye and false teeth was on the mantle
And on the bed she hung her lock of hair
And there was only one thing that filled my heart with sadness
Was she pitched her wooden leg upon the chair

And it was a limb from that old apple tree
(Repeat rest of chorus)

Yes I carved out my name and there it was plain
On her limb from the old apple tree.

== See also ==
- List of best-selling sheet music
