= Meet Me in St. Louis =

1944 American musical film by Vincente Minnelli

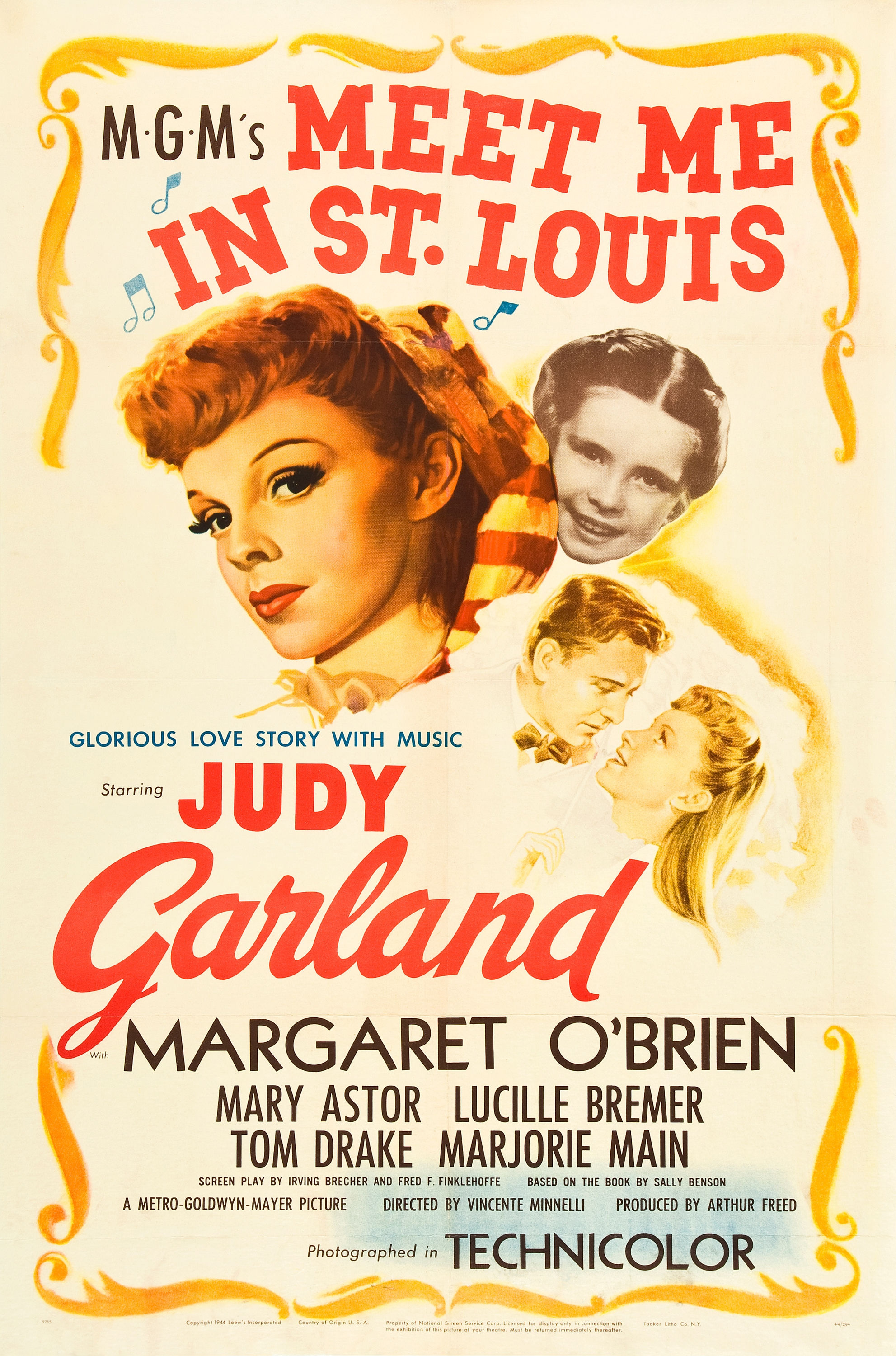
- Theatrical poster
- Directed by: Vincente Minnelli
- Screenplay by: Irving Brecher; Fred F. Finklehoffe
- Based on: Meet Me in St. Louis; 1942 novel by Sally Benson
- Produced by: Arthur Freed
- Starring: Judy Garland; Margaret O'Brien; Mary Astor; Lucille Bremer; Tom Drake; Marjorie Main
- Cinematography: George J. Folsey
- Edited by: Albert Akst
- Music by: George Stoll
- Production company: Metro-Goldwyn-Mayer
- Distributed by: Loew's, Inc.
- Release dates: November 22, 1944 (St. Louis); November 28, 1944 (New York City)
- Running time: 113 minutes
- Country: United States
- Language: English
- Budget: $1.9 million
- Box office: $6.6 million (original release) $12.9 million (re-releases)

Meet Me in St. Louis is a 1944 American musical film in Technicolor made by Metro-Goldwyn-Mayer. Divided into a series of seasonal vignettes, starting with Summer 1903, it relates the story of a year in the life of the Smith family in St. Louis leading up to the opening of the Louisiana Purchase Exposition (most commonly referred to as the World's Fair) in the spring of 1904. The film stars Judy Garland, Margaret O'Brien, Mary Astor, Lucille Bremer, Tom Drake, Leon Ames, Marjorie Main, Harry Davenport, June Lockhart, and Joan Carroll.

The film was adapted by Irving Brecher and Fred F. Finklehoffe from a series of short stories by Sally Benson originally published in The New Yorker magazine called "The Kensington Stories" and later in novel form as Meet Me in St. Louis. The film was directed by Vincente Minnelli, who met Garland on the set and later married her. Tony Award-winning designer Lemuel Ayers served as its art director.

Upon its release, Meet Me in St. Louis was both a critical and a commercial success. It became the second-highest-grossing film of the year, behind only Going My Way, and was also MGM's most successful musical of the 1940s. In 1994, it was deemed "culturally, historically, or aesthetically significant" by the Library of Congress and selected for preservation in the United States National Film Registry.

In the film, Garland debuted the standards "The Trolley Song", "The Boy Next Door", and "Have Yourself a Merry Little Christmas", all by Hugh Martin and Ralph Blane and all of which became hits after the film's release. The film's producer Arthur Freed also wrote and performed one of the songs.

== Plot ==
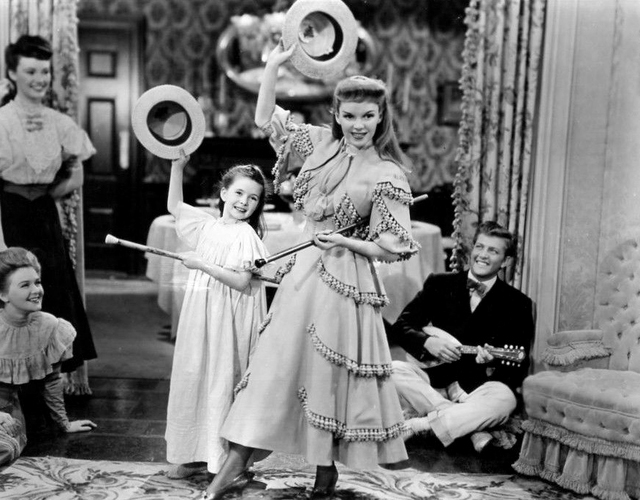
Margaret O'Brien and Judy Garland perform the song "Under the Bamboo Tree" in Meet Me in St. Louis

The backdrop for the film is St. Louis, Missouri, in the year preceding the 1904 Louisiana Purchase Exposition World's Fair.

In the summer of 1903, the Smith family leads a comfortable upper-middle class life. Alonzo Smith and his wife Anna have a very handsome son, Lon Jr., and four very beautiful daughters: Rose, Esther, Agnes, and Tootie. Esther, the second-oldest daughter, is in love with the boy next door, John Truett, although he does not notice her at first. Tootie the youngest, rides with iceman Mr. Neely and debates whether St. Louis is the nation's top city. Rose, the eldest daughter, hopes in vain to receive a marriage proposal from Warren Sheffield.

Esther finally meets John properly when he attends the Smiths' farewell party for college-bound Lon Jr. She hopes to see him again on a trolley ride to the construction site of the World's Fair.

On Halloween, Tootie and Agnes attend a bonfire. Later, after Tootie appears with a split lip and lost tooth, she claims John tried to kill her. Esther confronts John, physically attacking and scolding him. After Esther returns, Tootie and Agnes confess: John was trying to protect them from the police after a dangerous prank went wrong. Upon learning the truth, Esther apologizes to John and he kisses her.

Mr. Smith announces that he has been promoted to his firm's New York City office, and the family will move there after Christmas. Everyone is devastated by the news, especially Rose and Esther, whose romances, friendships and educational plans are threatened. Esther is also aghast because they will miss the World's Fair. Although Mrs. Smith is also upset, she reconciles with her husband and they sing a tender duet at the piano.

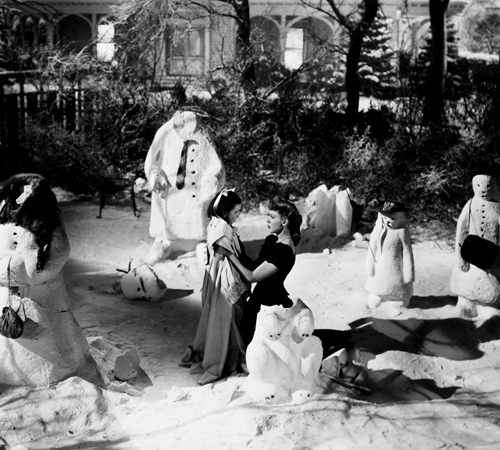
Margaret O'Brien and Judy Garland in Meet Me in St. Louis

An elegant ball takes place on Christmas Eve. John apologizes to Esther because he was too late to pick up his tuxedo at the tailor, and cannot escort her. An upset Esther is relieved when her grandfather gallantly offers to take her instead. At the ball, Esther and Rose plot to ruin the evening of Warren's date Lucille Ballard by filling her dance card with losers. They are surprised to find that Lucille is warm, friendly, and not a snob. Lucille suggests that Warren should be with Rose, allowing her to be with Lon. Esther switches her dance card with Lucille's and takes on the clumsy and awkward partners. After being rescued by Grandpa, Esther is overjoyed when John appears in a tuxedo and they dance for the rest of the evening. Later, John proposes to Esther and she accepts, but their future is uncertain because she must still move to New York.

Esther returns home to find Tootie waiting impatiently for Santa Claus and worrying about whether she can bring all her toys with her to New York. After Esther sings a poignant rendition of "Have Yourself a Merry Little Christmas", a neurotic Tootie runs out to the yard and destroys the snowmen they must leave behind. Esther reassures Tootie that they will be together no matter where they go and carries her off to bed. Mr. Smith, who witnessed the emotional scene outside, begins to have second thoughts. After thinking in the living room, he summons the family downstairs and announces they will not move to New York, much to everyone's surprise and joy. Warren rushes into the Smith home, declares his love for Rose, and announces they will marry at the first possible opportunity. Realizing that it is now Christmas, the Smiths celebrate.

The next spring, at the World's Fair, the family gathers overlooking the Grand Lagoon just as thousands of lights around the grand pavilion are illuminated.

== Cast ==
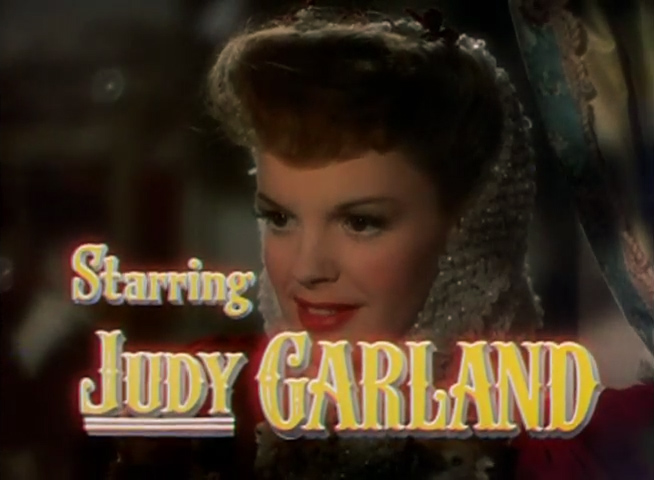
Judy Garland as Esther Smith

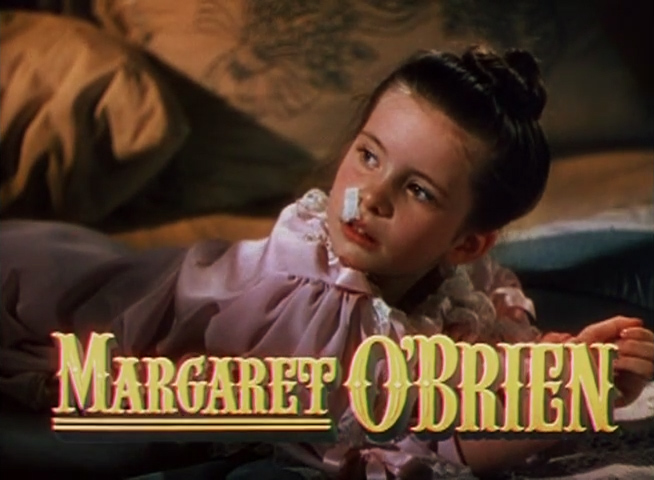
Margaret O'Brien as "Tootie" Smith

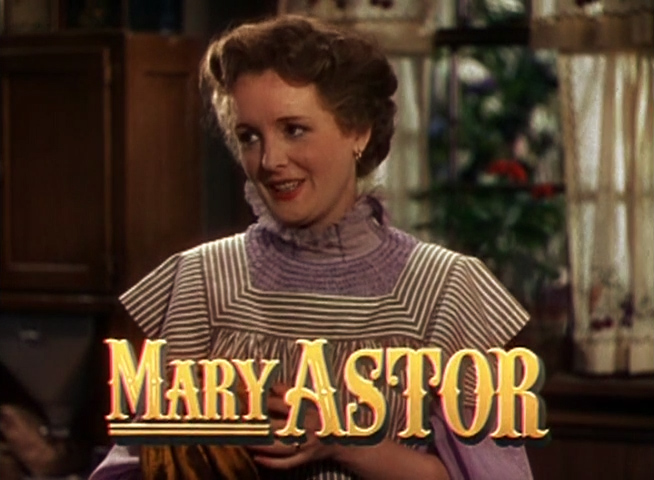
Mary Astor as Mrs. Anna Smith

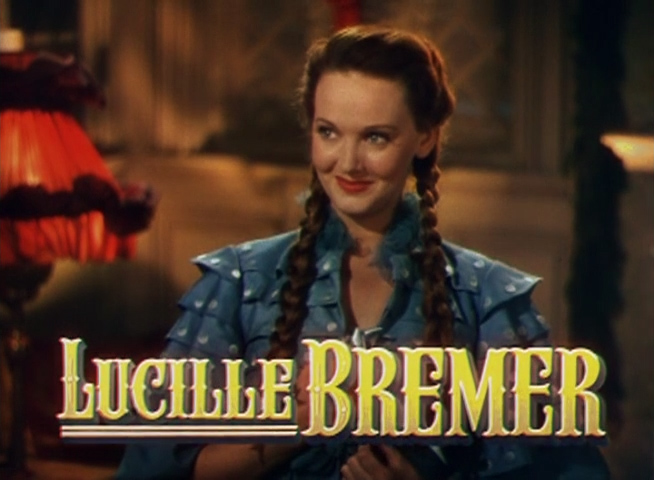
Lucille Bremer as Rose Smith

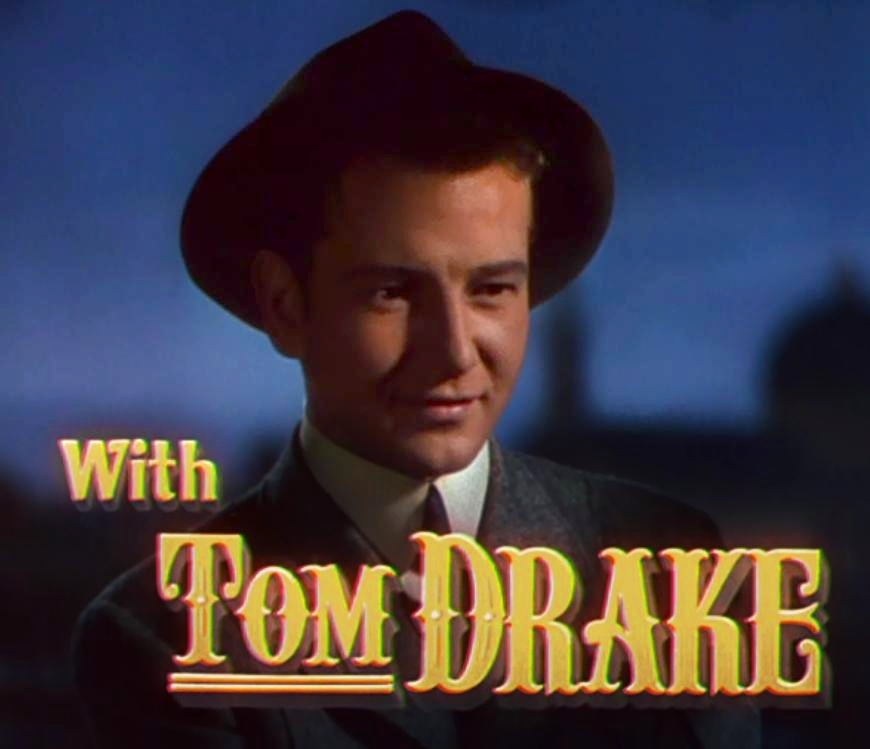
Tom Drake as John Truett

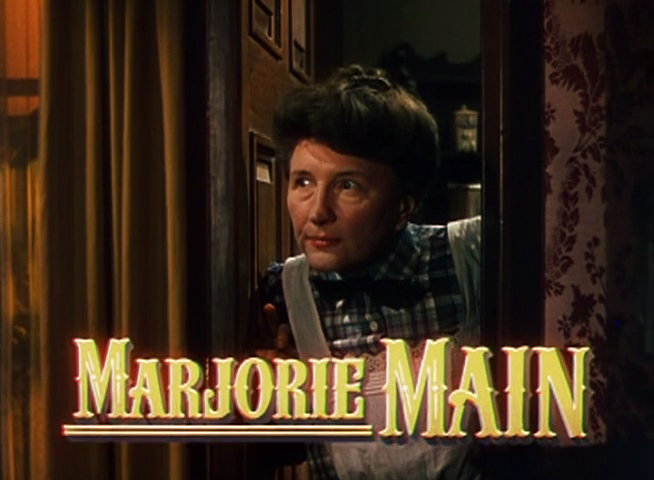
Marjorie Main as Katie (Maid)
- Leon Ames as Mr. Alonzo Smith
- Harry Davenport as Grandpa
- June Lockhart as Lucille Ballard
- Henry H. Daniels Jr. as Lon Smith Jr.
- Joan Carroll as Agnes Smith
- Hugh Marlowe as Colonel Darly
- Robert Sully as Warren Sheffield
- Chill Wills as Mr. Neely
- Dorothy Tuttle as Girl on Trolley

== Production ==
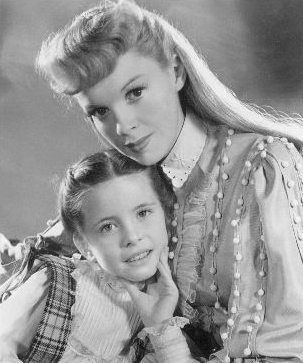
Margaret O'Brien and Judy Garland

The film is based on "The Kensington Stories", a series of sentimental family stories by Sally Benson that appeared in The New Yorker in 1942 and later in novel form as Meet Me in St. Louis. Shortly after the publication of the stories, Arthur Freed, who had enjoyed previous success with Judy Garland in MGM musicals, convinced studio head Louis B. Mayer to purchase the film rights for $25,000, and Benson was also hired to work on the screen adaptation. The idea for the film was also inspired by Life with Father, a nostalgic family play that had been running on Broadway to great success and acclaim since 1939.

While Freed and his writers developed the script, director Vincente Minnelli, whose background was in set and costume design, prepared the film's design. Minnelli worked with designer Lemuel Ayers on set design and with art director E. Preston Ames to capture the evocative quality of paintings by Thomas Eakins, a popular artist and illustrator at the time in which the story takes place.

A staff of six writers worked with Benson to capture the essence of her stories, including Doris Gilbert, who had worked with Benson previously. Freed hired the husband-and-wife team of Victor Heerman and Sarah Mason in mid-1942 to add an element of intrigue to the script. They introduced a blackmail plot involving Esther Smith, which Freed found inappropriate, so he tasked staff writer William Ludwig, a specialist in adolescent romance, to excise the blackmail plot and weave courtship stories into the screenplay. By February 1943, Freed was satisfied with Ludwig's script and distributed copies around MGM and to the principal cast members. However, Garland was dissatisfied with the script, feeling its plot to be weak and her character too juvenile. Mayer agreed, and Freed brought in a pair of writers to revise Ludwig's script who added the storyline of the family's looming move to New York. Freed liked the changes but Garland remained unhappy with the script.

Freed's conflict with producer Joseph L. Mankiewicz, Garland's lover who was developing what would become The Pirate with Garland in mind for the lead role, nearly caused Meet Me in St. Louis to be indefinitely postponed. The situation was resolved when Mankiewicz left MGM for Fox, and Freed's project was given the green light with a preliminary budget of $1,395,000 and plans to begin production in early October 1943. However, production was delayed because of studio problems and Technicolor Inc.'s heavy schedule, and the project finally entered production on December 7, 1943, with shooting scheduled for 58 days and a budget that had increased to $1,500,000. Nearly half of the film's budget was devoted to sets ($497,000) and music ($234,000). Story and continuity costs exceeded $132,000 because of the numerous rewrites. Garland was paid $2,500 per week, Margaret O'Brien $250 per week and Minnelli $1,000 per week while producing the film.

Garland, unhappy with the script and unsure of herself as a leading lady, also suffered severe emotional problems, an acute addiction to amphetamines and numerous physical ailments such as recurring migraine headaches. Production reports show that she disrupted the schedule with fits of hysteria, habitual lateness and occasional absences, missing an entire week of shooting because she claimed to be suffering from an ear infection. Garland also balked at Minnelli's heavy schedule of rehearsals and prerecording sessions in the months preceding filming, but Minnelli won her confidence and the two became lovers, cohabiting by the time of the film's post-production and marrying soon after its release. Earlier in the production, Garland had a brief affair with her costar Tom Drake.

Production delays were also caused by illnesses suffered by O'Brien, Mary Astor (pneumonia) and Joan Carroll (appendicitis), but Minnelli used the delays to prepare O'Brien's most demanding and important scenes. Severe rains and flooding in the Los Angeles region caused further delays in the production of exterior scenes. Filming began on December 1, 1943, and was completed on April 7, 1944, behind schedule and with a final budget near $1.8 million. The first rough cut exceeded two hours in length, so the writers suggested edits that brought the film down to 113 minutes for its preview screenings in the summer of 1944. MGM, encouraged by overwhelmingly positive audience previews, held the film's release for the Christmas season.

Minnelli's idea to introduce each season segment with a greeting-card illustration dissolving into live action was most likely influenced by a similar technique used in Orson Welles' 1942 film The Magnificent Ambersons.

Freed's process for Meet Me in St. Louis established a pattern for Minnelli's future musicals: budgets in excess of $1 million, preproduction schedules sometimes exceeding a full year, shooting schedules of three to six months and postproduction phases of six months or longer.

== Music ==
The musical score for the film was adapted by Roger Edens, who also served as an uncredited associate producer. Georgie Stoll conducted the orchestrations of Conrad Salinger. Some of the songs in the film are from around the time of the St. Louis Exposition, and others were written for the film.

- "Meet Me in St. Louis, Louis", Kerry Mills and Andrew B. Sterling, 1904.
- "The Boy Next Door", Hugh Martin and Ralph Blane, 1944, performed by Judy Garland.
- "Skip to My Lou", traditional, with sections sung to the tunes of "Kingdom Coming", "Turkey in the Straw" and "Yankee Doodle" arranged by Hugh Martin and Ralph Blane, 1944
- "I Was Drunk Last Night", performed by Margaret O'Brien.
- "Under the Bamboo Tree", words and music by Robert Cole and the Johnson Bros., 1902, performed by Judy Garland and Margaret O'Brien.
- "Over the Banister", 19th-century melody adapted by Conrad Salinger, lyrics from the 1888 poem "Over the Banisters" by Ella Wheeler Wilcox, adapted by Roger Edens (1944), performed by Judy Garland.
- "The Trolley Song", Hugh Martin and Ralph Blane, 1944, performed by Chorus and Judy Garland.
- "You and I", Nacio Herb Brown and Arthur Freed, sung by Freed, the film's producer, and Denny Markas (the young woman in blue on the trolley, as seen in one of the pictures below), voices dubbed for Leon Ames and Mary Astor.
- "Goodbye, My Lady Love", instrumental, Joseph E. Howard, 1904.
- "Little Brown Jug", instrumental, Joseph Winner, 1869.
- "Down at the Old Bull and Bush", instrumental, Harry von Tilzer, 1903.
- "Home! Sweet Home!", instrumental, Henry Bishop, 1823/1852.
- "Auld Lang Syne", instrumental
- "The First Noel", instrumental
- "Have Yourself a Merry Little Christmas", Hugh Martin and Ralph Blane, 1944, performed by Judy Garland. The song's lyrics were originally different. Lyricist Hugh Martin's opening lyrics were deemed too depressing by Judy Garland, Tom Drake, and Vincente Minnelli, and Martin changed them. The lyrics originally were: "Have yourself a merry little Christmas / It may be your last / Next year we may all be living in the past." Years after the film's release, additional lyric changes were made for Frank Sinatra, who objected to the song's generally downbeat tone.

=== Deleted song ===
Garland's prerecording of "Boys and Girls Like You and Me" survives, but the cut film footage has been lost. This song was originally composed by Rodgers and Hammerstein for their Broadway musical Oklahoma!, but was cut prior to its opening.

== Reception ==
The trailer

Upon its 1944 release, Meet Me in St. Louis was a gigantic critical and commercial success. During its initial theatrical release, it earned a then-massive $5,016,000 in the US and Canada and $1,550,000 elsewhere, resulting in a profit of $2,359,000.

In The New York Times, critic Bosley Crowther called the film "warm and beguiling" and wrote: "Let those who would savor their enjoyment of innocent family merriment with the fragrance of dried-rose petals and who would revel in girlish rhapsodies make a bee-line right down to the Astor. For there's honey to be had inside. ... In the words of one of the gentlemen, it is a ginger-peachy show."

Time called Meet Me in St. Louis "one of the year's prettiest pictures" and wrote: "Technicolor has seldom been more affectionately used than in its registrations of the sober mahoganies and tender muslins and benign gaslights of the period. Now & then, too, the film gets well beyond the charm of mere tableau for short flights in the empyrean of genuine domestic poetry. These triumphs are creditable mainly to the intensity and grace of Margaret O'Brien and to the ability of director Minnelli & Co. to get the best out of her." O'Brien drew further praise from Time: "[Her] song and her cakewalk done in a nightgown at a grown-up party, are entrancing acts. Her self-terrified Halloween adventures richly set against firelight, dark streets, and the rusty confabulations of fallen leaves, bring this section of the film very near the first-rate."

In The New Yorker, Wolcott Gibbs called the film "extremely attractive" and the dialogue "funny in a sense rather rare in the movies", though he felt the film was too long.

In 2005, Richard Schickel included the film in Time.com's list of the 100 best films, writing: "It had wonderful songs [and] a sweetly unneurotic performance by Judy Garland....Despite its nostalgic charm, Minnelli infused the piece with a dreamy, occasionally surreal, darkness and it remains, for some of us, the greatest of American movie musicals." Film historian Karina Longworth also noted its fantastical and surreal elements, calling it "a gothic art film in disguise as a standard Metro-Goldwyn-Mayer musical".

Producer Arthur Freed remarked:

Meet Me in St. Louis is my personal favorite. I got along wonderfully with Judy, but the only time we were ever on the outs was when we did this film. She didn't want to do the picture. Even her mother came to me about it. We bumped into some trouble with some opinions—Eddie Mannix, the studio manager, thought the Halloween sequence was wrong, but it was left in. There was a song that Rodgers and Hammerstein had written, called "Boys and Girls Like You and Me", that Judy did wonderfully, but it slowed up the picture and it was cut out. After the preview of the completed film, Judy came over to me and said, "Arthur, remind me not to tell you what kind of pictures to make." [It] was the biggest grosser Metro had up to that time, except for Gone With the Wind.

Meet Me in St. Louis holds a 99% "Fresh" rating on the review aggregation website Rotten Tomatoes based on 81 reviews with an average score of 8.70/10. The site's critics' consensus for the film reads: "A disarmingly sweet musical led by outstanding performances from Judy Garland and Margaret O'Brien, Meet Me in St. Louis offers a holiday treat for all ages." Metacritic, which uses a weighted average, assigned the film a score of 94 out of 100, based on 18 critics, indicating "universal acclaim".

== Accolades ==
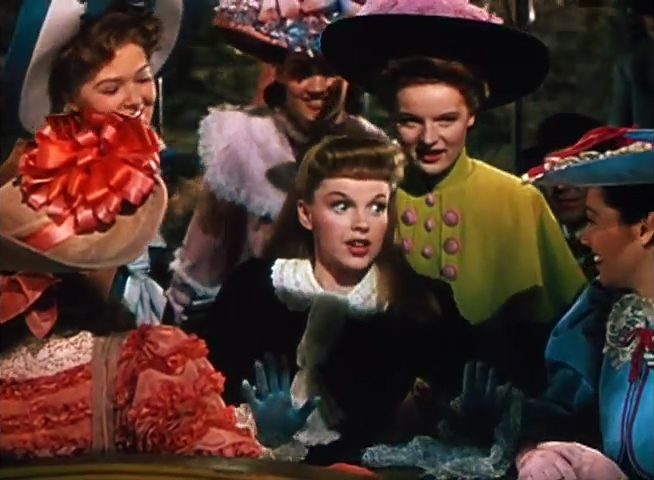
"The Trolley Song" was nominated for an Academy Award for Best Song.

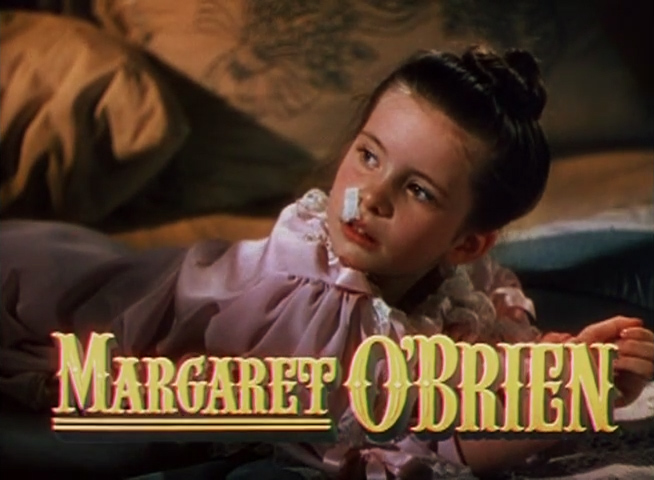
Margaret O'Brien won an Academy Juvenile Award for her screen work in 1944.

Award	Category	Nominee(s)	Result	Ref.
Academy Awards	Best Screenplay	Irving Brecher and Fred F. Finklehoffe	Nominated	
Academy Awards	Best Cinematography – Color	George J. Folsey	Nominated	
Academy Awards	Best Scoring of a Musical Picture	Georgie Stoll	Nominated	
Academy Awards	Best Song	"The Trolley Song"; Music and Lyrics by Ralph Blane and Hugh Martin	Nominated	
Academy Awards	Academy Juvenile Award	Margaret O'Brien	Won	
ASCAP Film and Television Music Awards	Most Performed Feature Film Standards	"Have Yourself a Merry Little Christmas"; Music and Lyrics by Ralph Blane and Hugh Martin	Won	
National Board of Review Awards	Top Ten Films		7th Place	
National Board of Review Awards	Best Acting	Margaret O'Brien	Won	
National Film Preservation Board	National Film Registry		Inducted	
Online Film & Television Association Awards	Film Hall of Fame: Productions		Inducted	
Online Film & Television Association Awards	Film Hall of Fame: Songs	"Have Yourself a Merry Little Christmas"	Inducted	
Photoplay Awards	Hall of Fame: Movie		Nominated	
Picturegoer Awards	Best Actress	Judy Garland	Nominated	
Satellite Awards	Best Youth DVD		Nominated	

- In 1994, the film was deemed "culturally, historically, or aesthetically significant" by the Library of Congress and selected for preservation in the United States National Film Registry.
- The American Film Institute ranked the film 10th on its AFI's Greatest Movie Musicals list. Two songs from the film were included in the AFI's 100 Years...100 Songs list ("The Trolley Song" at #26 and "Have Yourself a Merry Little Christmas" at #76).

== Adaptations ==
- Meet Me in St. Louis was remade in 1959 for television, starring Tab Hunter, Jane Powell, Jeanne Crain, Patty Duke, Walter Pidgeon, Ed Wynn and Myrna Loy. It was directed by George Schaefer, from the original Brecher and Finklehoffe screenplay.
- Meet Me in St. Louis was remade again for television in 1966. This was a non-musical version starring Shelley Fabares, Celeste Holm, Larry Merrill, Judy Land, Reta Shaw, Tammy Locke and Morgan Brittany. It was directed by Alan D. Courtney from a script written by Sally Benson and was intended as a pilot for a television series that failed to materialize. It was later included as a special feature on the two-disc DVD set released in 2004.
- A Broadway musical based on the film was produced in 1989, with additional songs.

== Later history ==
- The late-19th century vintage carousel in the film was located at the Boblo Island Amusement Park in Amherstburg, Ontario until the park closed in September 1993. It was dismantled and sold to private collectors.
- Gerald Kaufman wrote a study of the film, with the same title, which was published by the British Film Institute in 1994.
- The Smith family's former house at 5135 Kensington Avenue in St. Louis no longer exists. After being sold, it fell into disrepair, eventually became uninhabitable, and was demolished in 1994. The backlot house used as the exterior of the Smiths' family home later was used in the film Cheaper by the Dozen as the Gilbreths' family home.

== Source material ==
The plot points for the film originate from the following of Sally Benson's stories published in The New Yorker:

- "5135 Kensington: January, 1904" January 31, 1942 – Tootie and Grandpa visit the fairgrounds
- "5135 Kensington: February, 1904" February 28, 1942 – Mr. and Mrs. Smith go out and the girls have a gay time at home
- "5135 Kensington: March, 1904" March 28, 1942 – The family visits the World's Fair
- "5135 Kensington: April, 1904" April 11, 1942 – Not moving to New York
- "5135 Kensington: May, 1904" May 23, 1942 – A last look at the fair

== See also ==
- List of Christmas films
