= Irving Brecher =

American film director (1914–2008)

Irving S. Brecher
- Born: January 17, 1914; New York City, US
- Died: November 17, 2008 (age 94); Los Angeles, California, US
- Resting place: Hillside Memorial Park, Culver City, California
- Occupations: Screenwriter, producer, director
- Years active: 1937–1963
- Spouse(s): Eve Bennett (m. ?–1981; her death); Norma Brecher (m. 1983–2008; his death)

Irving S. Brecher (January 17, 1914 – November 17, 2008) was a screenwriter who wrote for the Marx Brothers among many others; he was the only writer to get sole credit on a Marx Brothers film, penning the screenplays for At the Circus (1939) and Go West (1940) (though both films contain contributions from uncredited writers). Brecher was also one of the numerous uncredited writers on the screenplay of The Wizard of Oz (1939). Some of his other screenplays were Shadow of the Thin Man (1941), Meet Me in St. Louis (1944), Ziegfeld Follies (1945) and Bye Bye Birdie (1963).

== Early years ==
Brecher was born in the Bronx, New York, and grew up in Yonkers.

== Career ==
Brecher moonlighted as a high school sports reporter for the Yonkers Herald while in high school As a teenager he was writing jokes, sending them to newspaper columnists Walter Winchell and Ed Sullivan on postcards.

At 19, Brecher's first professional involvement with movies was as an usher at a Manhattan movie theater.

As an aspiring young comedy writer, Brecher famously placed an ad in Variety looking for work, promising he could write "jokes so bad, even Milton Berle wouldn't steal them." Berle saw the ad and promptly hired Brecher.

He created, produced, and was head writer for the original radio and early TV edition of The Life of Riley. He also wrote for Al Jolson on radio and later created and co-produced The People's Choice as well.

Brecher's career in screenwriting began in 1937.

Adapting Nathaniel Benchley's novel, he wrote the screenplay for, and directed Sail A Crooked Ship starring Ernie Kovacs and a young Robert Wagner.

He received an Academy Award nomination in 1944 for his screenplay of Meet Me in St Louis.

Brecher, who bore a physical resemblance to Groucho Marx, once filled in for him in Marx Brothers publicity photos for the film At the Circus, despite an almost 25-year age difference.

== Works ==
- Brecher, Irving; Rosenfeld, Hank (January 2008). The Wicked Wit of the West!: The Last Great Golden-Age Screenwriter Shares the Hilarity and Heartaches of Working with Groucho, Garland, Gleason, Burns, Berle, Benny and Many More. Ben Yehuda Press. ISBN 978-0-9789980-8-0. "by Irving Brecher as told to Hank Rosenfeld, published posthumously"

== Death ==
Brecher died November 17, 2008. He was survived by his wife and three stepchildren.
