= Ben Ryan (composer) =

American composer (1892–1968)

Bennett A. "Ben" Ryan (March 30, 1892 – July 5, 1968), more commonly known by his stage name "Beethoven Ben", was an American songwriter who wrote the music and lyrics to the popular song "(The Gang that Sang) Heart of My Heart". He also wrote or co-wrote many other popular songs including "Inka Dinka Doo", "M-I-S-S-I-S-S-I-P-P-I", "No Nothing", "The Thrill of a New Romance", "When Frances Dances with Me", and "When I Send You a Picture of Berlin"

Born in Kansas City, Missouri, Ryan was also a vaudeville performer, film actor and screen writer. Between 1914–1925, he teamed with Harriet Lee as the "Ryan & Lee" duo's comedy and singing-and-dancing vaudeville acts, including the hit "Won and One is Two". Following a lengthy illness, on July 5, 1968, he died at his home in Leonia, New Jersey.
