= John F. Palmer =

American songwriter

John F. Palmer (born 1870) was an American professional actor and songwriter.

He and Charles B. Ward wrote the popular 1890s song "The Band Played On". Who wrote what is disputed; some sources say that Palmer wrote the music and lyrics, and that Ward then purchased it and made minor changes. It was first published in The New York Sunday World on June 30, 1895.
