= Dangerous When Wet =

1953 film by Charles Walters

- Theatrical release poster
- Directed by: Charles Walters
- Written by: Dorothy Kingsley
- Produced by: George Wells
- Starring: Esther Williams; Fernando Lamas; Jack Carson; Charlotte Greenwood; Denise Darcel; William Demarest; Donna Corcoran
- Cinematography: Harold Rosson
- Edited by: John McSweeney Jr.
- Music by: Albert Sendrey; George Stoll
- Production companies: Metro-Goldwyn-Mayer; M-G-M Cartoons (animated sequences)
- Distributed by: Loew's Inc.
- Release date: July 3, 1953
- Running time: 95 minutes
- Country: United States
- Language: English
- Budget: $1,465,000
- Box office: $3,255,000

Dangerous When Wet is a 1953 American live-action/animated musical comedy film starring Esther Williams, Fernando Lamas and Jack Carson, directed by Charles Walters and featuring an animated swimming sequence starring Williams with the cat-and-mouse duo Tom and Jerry.

== Plot ==
Katie Higgins is the wholesome daughter of a dairy farmer. The entire family (Pa, Ma, Suzie, Katie, and Junior) start the day with a brisk song and morning swim. One day, Katie meets traveling salesman Windy Weebe, who is instantly smitten. Weebe sells an elixir that purports to turn the user into a peppy, fit specimen, and upon noticing the entire family's strength in the water, he suggests that they all attempt to swim the English Channel. The family and Weebe travel to England and learn that the channel's distance is 20 miles "as the seagull flies," but with the currents, it can be as many as 42 miles. Katie is the only one of the family strong enough to attempt this feat, so she begins training with Weebe as her coach.

On a foggy day, Katie is rescued from the water by handsome Frenchman Andre Lanet, who falls for Katie and tries to woo her. Katie tries to stay focused on her swim, but she is pulled in different directions by Lanet and Weebe. In a dream sequence, Katie performs an underwater ballet with cartoon characters Tom and Jerry as well as with animated depictions of the people in her life. The film ends happily with Katie's attempt to cross the channel and the resolution of her love-life issues.

== Cast ==
=== Live-action cast ===
- Esther Williams as Katie Higgins
- Fernando Lamas as André Lanet
- Jack Carson as Windy Weebe
- Charlotte Greenwood as Ma Higgins
- Denise Darcel as Gigi Mignon
- William Demarest as Pa Higgins
- Donna Corcoran as Junior Higgins
- Barbara Whiting as Suzie Higgins
- Bunny Waters as Greta
- Henri Letondal as Joubert
- Paul Bryar as Pierre
- Jack Raine as Stuart Frye
- Richard Alexander as Egyptian Channel swimmer
- Tudor Owen as Old Salt
- Ann Codee as Mrs. Lanet
- Darrell Wesley Clow as the Norwegian Swimmer

=== Voice cast ===
- William Hanna as Tom and Jerry (uncredited)

== Production ==
The film was based on a story by Dorothy Kingsley. MGM liked the story, bought it and hired Kingsley to develop it into a screenplay. It was originally titled Everybody Swims and was intended as a vehicle for Esther Williams and Debbie Reynolds.

Tom and Jerry and Esther Williams

In the underwater sequences in which Williams speaks to Tom and Jerry, Joseph Barbera animated pink bubbles coming from her mouth, an effect that cost $50,000.

The film's ending was rewritten after an incident during the filming when Johnny Weissmuller (Esther's former Aquacade partner) dove into the water to swim alongside Florence Chadwick, whom he was coaching.

=== Casting ===
Reynolds was originally slated for the role of Williams's little sister Suzie.

Though Williams knew of Lamas before he was cast as her love interest, the two had never been formally introduced. They married in 1969, and remained so until Lamas's death in 1982. When asked whether she had known Lamas when the studio suggested his name as her costar, Williams mentioned that "he starred in movies with Jane Powell, Greer Garson, and Lana Turner, and [she] knew he was romantically linked to Lana Turner. And [she] heard he could swim. Yes, Fernando Lamas sounded like good casting." At first, Lamas declined the role, stating that he came to MGM to be a star, and only wanted to act in "important pictures." Williams convinced him that his part would be rewritten to be larger.

== Release ==
According to MGM records, the film earned $2,230,000 in the U.S. and Canada and $1,025,000 elsewhere, recording a profit of $386,000.

=== Critical reception ===
In a contemporary review for The New York Times, critic Bosley Crowther wrote: "[T]his frolicsome item not only dumps you quite often in the drink, but also gives you some rather pleasant company to clown around with while on dry ground. ... [T]here is nothing very special or spectacular about Dangerous When Wet, but it comes as relaxing entertainment at this torpid time of the year." Crowther also called the Tom and Jerry sequence "outstanding."

A review from Variety called the film "a light mixture of tunes, comedy, water ballet and Esther Williams in a bathing suit."

=== Home media ===
On July 17, 2007, Warner Home Video and Turner Entertainment released Dangerous When Wet on DVD as part of the Esther Williams Spotlight Collection, Volume 1. The five-disc set contained digitally remastered versions of several of Williams's films including Bathing Beauty (1944), Easy to Wed (1946), On an Island with You (1948) and Neptune's Daughter (1949)

The Tom and Jerry sequence is also featured in several Tom and Jerry DVD and Blu-ray releases issued by Warner Home Video, including the Tom and Jerry Spotlight Collection, Volume 1 (in the bonus features) and Tom and Jerry: The Deluxe Anniversary Collection (Disc 2, as a special short).

On June 27, 2023, Warner Archive Collection is set to release a 1080p HD master from the 4K scan of original Technicolor camera negatives.
