= Time of Vacation =

- Directed by: Antonio Racioppi
- Written by: Luigi Zampa; Luigi Magni; Willie Antuono; Paolo Frascà; Age & Scarpelli
- Cinematography: Massimo Sallusti
- Edited by: Eraldo Da Roma
- Music by: Alessandro Cicognini; Xavier Cugat
- Release date: 1956
- Country: Italy
- Language: Italian

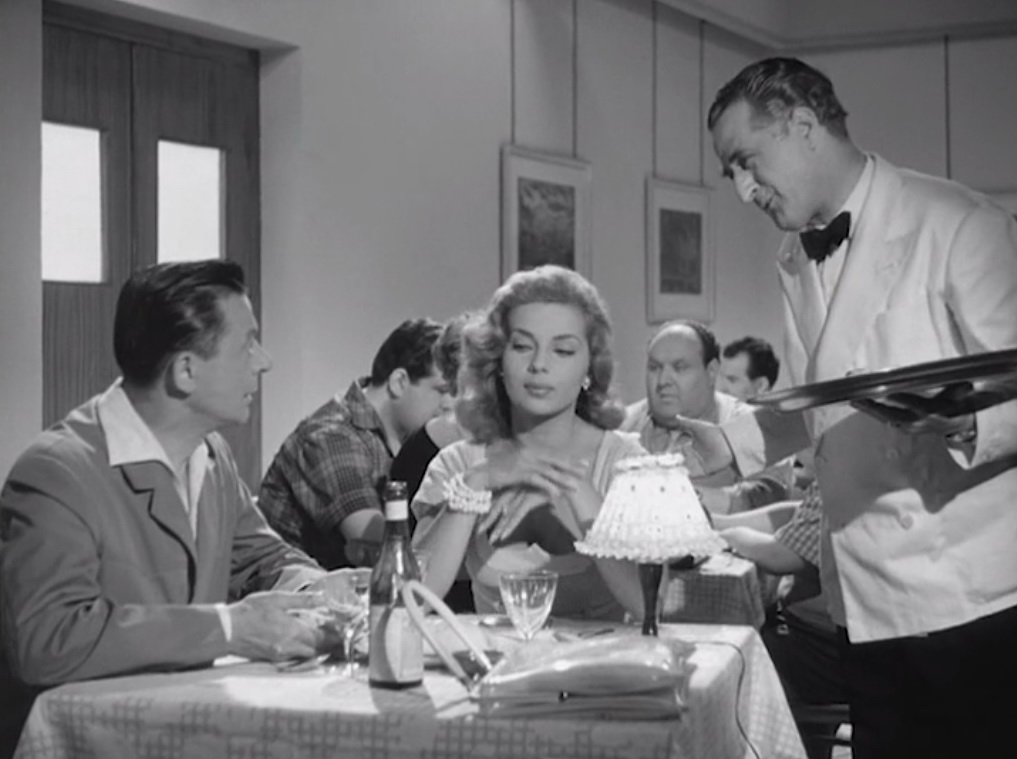
Wando Tres, Abbe Lane and Memmo Carotenuto in film

Time of Vacation (Italian: Tempo di villeggiatura) is a 1956 Italian comedy film directed by Antonio Racioppi, at his directorial debut.

For this film Marisa Merlini won a Silver Ribbon for Best supporting Actress.

== Plot ==
In a hotel in Corniolo, a small village on the outskirts of the city of Rome that has become a tourist resort, the many stories of various people are interwoven. An accountant courts a young lady, pretending to be shy. An aspiring actor asks the waitresses for help to survive. A driver falls in love with a former dancer causing his girlfriend to react. A medical student is ashamed of his father, an honest head waiter.

== Cast ==
- Vittorio De Sica: Il ragionier Aristide Rossi
- Giovanna Ralli: Lella, la fidanzata
- Memmo Carotenuto: Alfredo, il capo cameriere
- Nino Manfredi: Carletto, l'attore
- Marisa Merlini: La signorina Margherita Pozzi
- Maurizio Arena: Checco, l'autista
- Bella Visconti: Silvana
- Gabriele Tinti: Luciano, lo studente
- Dina Perbellini: La signora Adele
- Virgilio Riento: Il frate Serafino
- Gildo Bocci: Lo zio Santino
- Abbe Lane: Dolores, l'ex ballerina
- Edoardo Toniolo: Il signore che protesta e insulta
- Antonio Acqua: Il direttore dell'hotel
- Roberto Bruni: Fabrizio
- Ciccio Barbi: L'ispettore di produzione
