= Chicago Syndicate (film) =

1955 film by Fred F. Sears

- Theatrical release poster
- Directed by: Fred F. Sears
- Screenplay by: Joseph Hoffman
- Story by: William Sackheim
- Produced by: Sam Katzman
- Starring: Dennis O'Keefe; Abbe Lane
- Cinematography: Henry Freulich; Fred Jackman Jr.
- Edited by: Viola Lawrence
- Color process: Black and white
- Production company: Sam Katzman Productions
- Distributed by: Columbia Pictures
- Release date: July 1, 1955
- Running time: 84 minutes
- Country: United States
- Language: English

Chicago Syndicate is a 1955 American film noir crime film directed by Fred F. Sears and starring Dennis O'Keefe and Abbe Lane.

== Plot ==
US Treasury accountant and World War II hero Barry Amsterdam is asked by Chicago newspaper editor David Healey and civic leaders to go undercover and infiltrate the crime syndicate of Arnold Valent, who runs a corrupt insurance business as a front. Valent is believed responsible for murdering his bookkeeper, Nelson Kern, who had gone to the newspaper with proof of Valent's criminal activity.

In the aftermath, Kern's wife committed suicide and daughter Joyce was allegedly committed to a sanitarium. This and a $60,000 payday convince the avaricious Barry to accept the dangerous job. He goes to a nightclub Valent owns, brusquely using a woman named Sue Morton to gain access to its hidden gambling den. There, he meets Valent's girlfriend, club singer Connie Peters. He then tells Valent he was a witness to Kern's murder and will go to the police unless Valent makes him a better offer.

Valent hires but doesn't trust him, at least until Barry, secretly working with the police, arranges a fraudulent jewel theft and insurance scam that saves Valent $70,000...and nets Barry $5,000. In a confrontation with Sue Morton, Barry reveals her to actually be the murdered man's daughter, Joyce Kern. When she learns from the police who Barry really is, she begins to help him.

Unable to get his hands on some incriminating microfilm he knows Connie has, Barry schemes to make her jealous by insinuating Joyce in her place with Valent. Connie threatens to expose Valent, whose thugs give her a brutal beating. She gets the microfilm to Barry, who is shot and wounded before Valent is killed by the police.

== Cast ==
- Dennis O'Keefe as Barry Amsterdam
- Abbe Lane as Connie Peters
- Paul Stewart as Arnold 'Arnie' Valent
- Xavier Cugat as Benny Chico
- Allison Hayes as Joyce Kern – alias Sue Morton
- Richard H. Cutting as David Healey / Narrator
- Chris Alcaide as Nate
- William Challee as Dolan
- John Zaremba as Det. Lt. Robert Fenton
- George Brand as Jack Roper
- Hugh Sanders as Pat Winters
- Mark Hanna as Brad Lacey
- Carroll McComas as Mrs. Valent

== Production ==
The King Brothers sued Columbia and Clover Productions for damages of $1 million due to their using the title Chicago Syndicate, claiming they registered the title The Syndicate in 1950.
