= Bathing Beauty =

1944 film by George Sidney

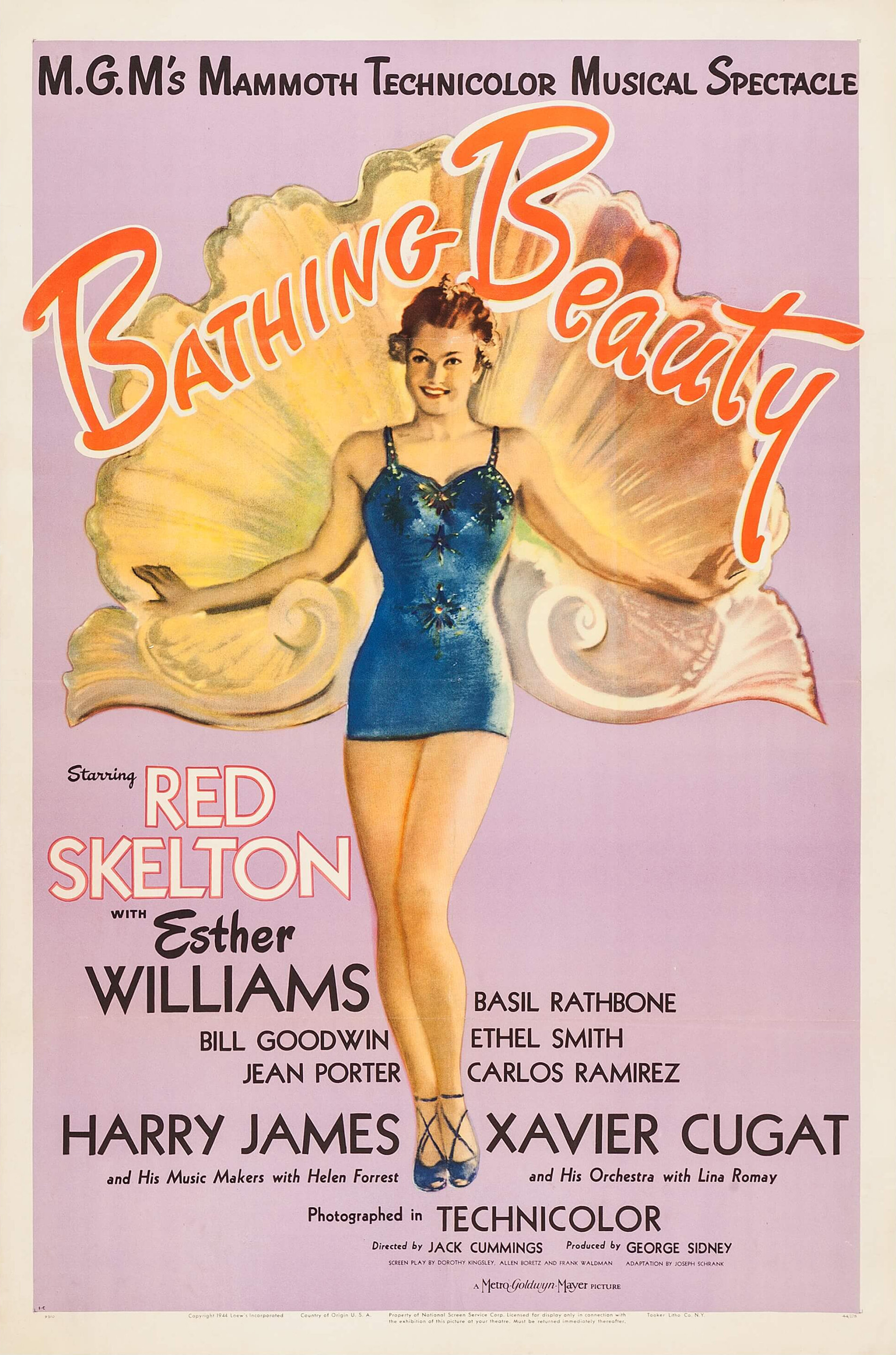
- Theatrical release poster
- Directed by: George Sidney
- Screenplay by: Dorothy Kingsley; Allen Boretz; Frank Waldman
- Story by: Kenneth Earl; M.M. Musselman; Curtis Kenyon
- Adaptation by: Joseph Schrank
- Produced by: Jack Cummings
- Starring: Red Skelton; Esther Williams; Basil Rathbone; Bill Goodwin; Ethel Smith; Jean Porter; Lina Romay; Carlos Ramírez
- Cinematography: Harry Stradling
- Edited by: Blanche Sewell
- Music by: Herbert Stothart; Alberto Colombo
- Production company: Metro-Goldwyn-Mayer
- Distributed by: Loew's Inc.
- Release date: June 27, 1944
- Running time: 101 minutes
- Country: United States
- Language: English
- Budget: $2,361,000
- Box office: $6,892,000

Bathing Beauty is a 1944 American musical romantic comedy film directed by George Sidney and starring Red Skelton and Esther Williams.

Although this was not Williams' screen debut, it was her first Technicolor musical. The film's working title was Mr. Co-Ed, with Skelton having top billing. However, once MGM executives watched the first cut of the film, they realized that Williams' role should be showcased more, and changed the title to Bathing Beauty, giving her prominent billing and featuring her bathing suit-clad figure on the posters.

The film is also Janis Paige's film debut. Afterwards Paige would go to Warner Brothers to make such films as Of Human Bondage, Hollywood Canteen, and Romance on the High Seas. In the late 1950s, Paige would return to Metro-Goldwyn-Mayer for a few films.

== Plot ==
In Los Angeles, songwriter Steve Elliot prepares to marry Caroline Brooks, who has pledged to give up her job as a college swimming instructor. Likewise, Steve plans to quit his songwriting career, even though New York producer George Adams has already hired him to write new songs for a water ballet show.

When George overhears Steve discussing his "retirement" with Caroline, he vows to prevent it and enlists Maria Dorango, an aspiring actress posing as a Latin-American singer, to help him. Moments after a justice of the peace pronounces the redheaded Steve and Caroline man and wife, Maria rushes in, claiming that Steve is her husband and the father of her three redheaded children, who are then paraded in. Although Steve pleads his innocence, Caroline storms off in a rage and returns to her teaching post at Victoria College in New Jersey. A determined Steve and his friend, Carlos Ramírez, follow her there but are denied entrance to the all-female school.

Later in a New York nightclub, Steve meets drunken lawyer Chester Klazenfrantz and learns that Klazenfrantz has been hired to change the charter of Victoria College, which has never officially designated itself as all-female. Armed with this information, Steve returns to Victoria and insists on applying for admission. Unaware of Caroline's relationship to Steve, Dean Clinton suggests to the faculty that he be admitted for a two-week probationary period, during which they would give him 100 demerits, thus qualifying him for expulsion before Parents Day.

Once enrolled and housed in a dusty basement storage space away from the female students, Steve tries to speak with Caroline, but she refuses to listen to his explanations and tells him she is seeking an annulment. Later in music class, stodgy Professor Hendricks attempts to discredit Steve, whose presence on campus has created a furor among the students, by ordering him to write his own version of the Scottish ballad, Loch Lomond, and teach class the next day. With help from several talented students, Carlos, the music teaching assistant, and Steve's friend Harry James and his orchestra, Steve meets Hendricks' challenge and is awarded an A.

That night, Steve visits Caroline at her house but is turned out after Willis Evans, a conservative botany professor who is in love with Caroline, arrives. When Caroline realizes that Steve is hiding in her closet, spying on her, she commands Willis' Great Dane, Duke, to guard the closet door while reminding Steve that unless he is back in his room in five minutes, he will be expelled for breaking curfew. With only seconds to spare, Steve manages to trick the dog long enough to escape back to his dingy basement room. Steve is then visited by George, who threatens to vilify him in the press unless he finishes his songs. When Steve swears deadly revenge on the person who hired Maria, however, George backs down and offers to help Steve do his homework.

Concerned about the approaching Parents Day, Dean Clinton commands Steve's professors, who have penalized him with only fifty-five demerits, to bear down on him. To that end, Madame Zarka, Steve's ruthlessly strict eurythmics instructor, forces him to wear a tutu and dance with the female students. Steve is embarrassed and unwilling to humiliate himself, but when Zarka starts giving out demerits, he proceeds to do a ballet number. A now desperate Dean Clinton asks Caroline to go out with Steve and ensure that he arrives back at Victoria after the curfew. Caroline agrees, but during the evening, Steve convinces her of his innocence, and as they drive back to school, they make plans to return to California together. Unbeknownst to them, Maria is on campus looking to expose George, who has been trying to get rid of her, to Steve. At the same time, a campus sorority descends on Steve's room hoping to initiate him, and Jean Allenwood and a student (Janis) show up with news that her parents (mother played by Margaret Dumont) and Dean Clinton are on their way over to inspect the room to confirm if the rumors of a male student being on campus are true. In a nod to the Marx Brothers, as Steve desperately hides all the women in two closets and keeps Caroline from discovering Maria, George unexpectedly arrives. Although Steve succeeds in hiding George and himself and fooling Dean Clinton and the Allenwoods, Maria soon makes her presence known to Caroline, who once again leaves in a fury, with everyone else exiting in a comical parade.

Later, Steve promises to write songs for George's water ballet show on condition that he make Caroline the star. George agrees, and after Maria is finally able to tell Caroline the truth, Caroline happily reunites with Steve. When the water ballet is over, Steve chases George into the water for vengeance, but when Steve remembers that he doesn't know how to swim, Caroline rescues him and gives him a kiss.

== Cast ==
- Red Skelton as Steve Elliot
- Esther Williams as Caroline Brooks
- Basil Rathbone as George Adams
- Bill Goodwin as Professor Willis Evans
- Jean Porter as Jean Allenwood
- Nana Bryant as Dean Clinton
- Carlos Ramírez as himself
- Ethel Smith as Ethel Smith, music teacher
- Xavier Cugat as himself, leader of Xavier Cugat and His Orchestra
- Lina Romay as herself, singer with Xavier Cugat and His Orchestra
- Harry James as himself, leader of Harry James and His Music Makers
- Helen Forrest as herself, singer with Harry James and His Music Makers
- Donald Meek as Chester Klazenfrantz
- Jacqueline Dalya as Maria Dorango
- Francis Pierlot as Professor Hendricks
- Ann Codee as Mme. Zarka
- Margaret Dumont as Mrs. Allenwood
- Bunny Waters as Bunny
- Janis Paige as Janis
- Dorothy Adams as Miss Hanney, faculty secretary (uncredited)
- Jane Isbell as Western Union girl (uncredited)

== Production ==
Dorothy Kingsley, who wrote the script, had done some writing on Girl Crazy. Jack Cummings brought her on to Bathing Beauty.

There'd been a million writers on it [before me] but the script was just bleh, lying there. They couldn't shoot it, even though they had commitments with Esther Williams and Red Skelton, with Harry James the trumpet player, and with Xavier Cugat the cha-cha-cha man. They had shot the musical numbers and they had no story! They had shot a great number with Xavier Cugat, only nobody in the script had any reason to be there to see this number! I had to think up something and then send a page down [to the set] for them to shoot. It was really wild. That's not the way you should make a picture, on the whole. I had a real baptism of fire. But the picture worked out, it was a big hit, Esther's first big picture.

Skelton was advised to shave his red chest hair for the swimming sequences. He protested and after conferencing with his wife, only cut the hair once the studio paid him $200 in cash and saved all of the curls in a plastic bag. Another scene with Skelton proved difficult to complete with his character trapped in a house with a large aggressive dog outside. The scene was due to be scrapped until Buster Keaton visited the set and quickly suggested a satisfactory resolution.

The pool sequences were shot on location at the Lakeside Country Club in the San Fernando Valley. The film was shot during January and the grass on the rolling country club lawns was dead and brown. Director George Sidney brought in a paint crew and had the dead grass spray-painted green, which lasted the entire week of shooting. However, that ruined the grass, and the studio had to send in crews in the spring to reseed the lawn.

Williams' date to the first preview of the film in Pomona was her soon-to-be husband, Sergeant Ben Gage.

== Release ==
The film premiered at the Astor Theater in New York City. For the event, MGM publicity set up a six-story-tall billboard of Williams diving into Times Square with a large sign that said, "Come on in. The water's fine!"

=== Critical response ===
Response for the film was "glowing", as Williams wrote in her autobiography. In a 1944 review for The New York Times, Bosley Crowther scoffed at the title but also wrote: "Miss Williams' talents as a swimmer — not to mention her other attributes — make any title the studio wants to put on it okay by us. When she eels through the crystal blue water in a rosy-red bathing suit or splashes in limpid magnificence in the gaudy water carnival which John Murray Anderson has brought to pass, she's a bathing beauty for our money, even though dragged in by the heels. In other words, Bathing Beauty is a colorful shower of music, comedy, and dance. As July pants hotly on June's heels, it is a pleasant refreshment to have at hand."

=== Box office ===
Bathing Beauty was a box-office success. According to MGM records, the film earned $3,284,000 in the United States and Canada, and $3,608,000 elsewhere, resulting in a profit of $2,132,000. It was one of the most popular films of 1946 in France with admissions of 5,438,665.

=== Home media ===
Esther Williams emerges from the water during the finale.

On July 17, 2007, Turner Entertainment released Bathing Beauty on DVD as part of TCM Spotlight: Esther Williams, Volume 1. The five-disc set contains digitally remastered versions of several of Williams' films, including Easy to Wed (1946), On an Island with You (1948), Neptune's Daughter (1949), and Dangerous When Wet (1953)

=== Influence ===
The six-minute ballet class sequence was used in The Clown, a 1953 film inspired by The Champ (1931), which stars Skelton as a once-famous Ziegfeld Follies star.

Several moments from the film became famous: swimmers lining one edge of the pool dive in sideways in domino fashion, Williams being introduced and received like Venus emerging from the water, her high swan dive, and her being surrounded by other swimmers who form a circle. The overhead shots of these elaborate choreographed sequences became iconic, especially for Williams and choreographer Busby Berkeley.

The finale water ballet sequence has been parodied several times, most famously in The Great Muppet Caper (1981) with Miss Piggy; the Mel Brooks comedies Blazing Saddles (1974) and History of the World, Part I (1981); on The Carol Burnett Show episode with "Slippery When Wet" (1976), briefly in the "Be Our Guest" sequence in the Disney film Beauty and the Beast (1991), in The Simpsons episode "Bart of Darkness" (1994) with Lisa Simpson, and in Hail, Caesar! (2016) with Scarlett Johansson.

The film is recognized by American Film Institute in these lists:

- 2006: AFI's Greatest Movie Musicals – Nominated

== Soundtrack ==
The soundtrack features many on-screen performances of big band greats of the era: Harry James, Xavier Cugat, Ethel Smith, Helen Forrest, and Lina Romay.

- "Magic is the Moonlight (Te quiero, dijiste)" – Carlos Ramírez (in Spanish) with the Xavier Cugat Orchestra
- "I'll Take the High Note" – played during the opening credits, then by Red Skelton, Jean Porter, Janis Paige, Carlos Ramírez, and Helen Forrest
- "Bim, Bam, Bum" – Lina Romay with the Xavier Cugat Orchestra
- "Trumpet Blues and Cantabile" – Harry James and His Music Makers with Harry James on trumpet
- "By the Waters of the Minnetonka: An Indian Love Song" – Ethel Smith
- "Tico-Tico no Fubá" – Ethel Smith
- "Alma llanera" – Lina Romay with the Xavier Cugat Orchestra
- "Hora staccato" – Harry James, Harry James and His Music Makers
- "I Cried for You" – Helen Forrest, Harry James and His Music Makers
- "Boogie Woogie" – Harry James and His Music Makers
- "The Thrill of a New Romance" – Xavier Cugat Orchestra

== See also ==
- List of American films of 1944

== Bibliography ==
- Williams, Esther; Diehl, Digby (1999). The Million Dollar Mermaid: An Autobiography. New York: Simon & Schuster. ISBN 978-0-1560-1135-8.
