= Tico-Tico no Fubá (film) =

1952 film directed by Adolfo Celi

- Directed by: Adolfo Celi
- Written by: Jacques Maret, Oswaldo Sampaio
- Produced by: Adolfo Celi, Fernando De Barros
- Cinematography: José María Beltrán, H.E. Fowle
- Edited by: Edith Hafenrichter, Oswald Hafenrichter
- Music by: Radamés Gnattali
- Distributed by: Vera Cruz Studios, Columbia Pictures
- Release date: 21 April 1952
- Running time: 109 minutes
- Country: Brazil
- Language: Portuguese

Tico-Tico no Fubá is a 1952 Brazilian drama film directed by Adolfo Celi and starring Anselmo Duarte. It was entered into the 1952 Cannes Film Festival.

The film is a fictionalized biography of Brazilian composer Zequinha de Abreu (1880–1935), who penned the song "Tico-Tico no Fubá" that became an international hit in the 1940s.

== Cast ==
- Anselmo Duarte as Zequinha de Abreu
- Tônia Carrero as Branca
- Marisa Prado as Durvalina
- Marina Freire as Amália
- Zbigniew Ziembinski as Circus Master
- Modesto De Souza as Luís
- Haydée Moraes Aguiar
- Luiz Augusto Arantes
- Tito Livio Baccarin
- Lima Barreto as Inácio
- Xandó Batista as Vendedor de rádio
