= Lina Romay (singer) =

American singer (1919 – 2010)

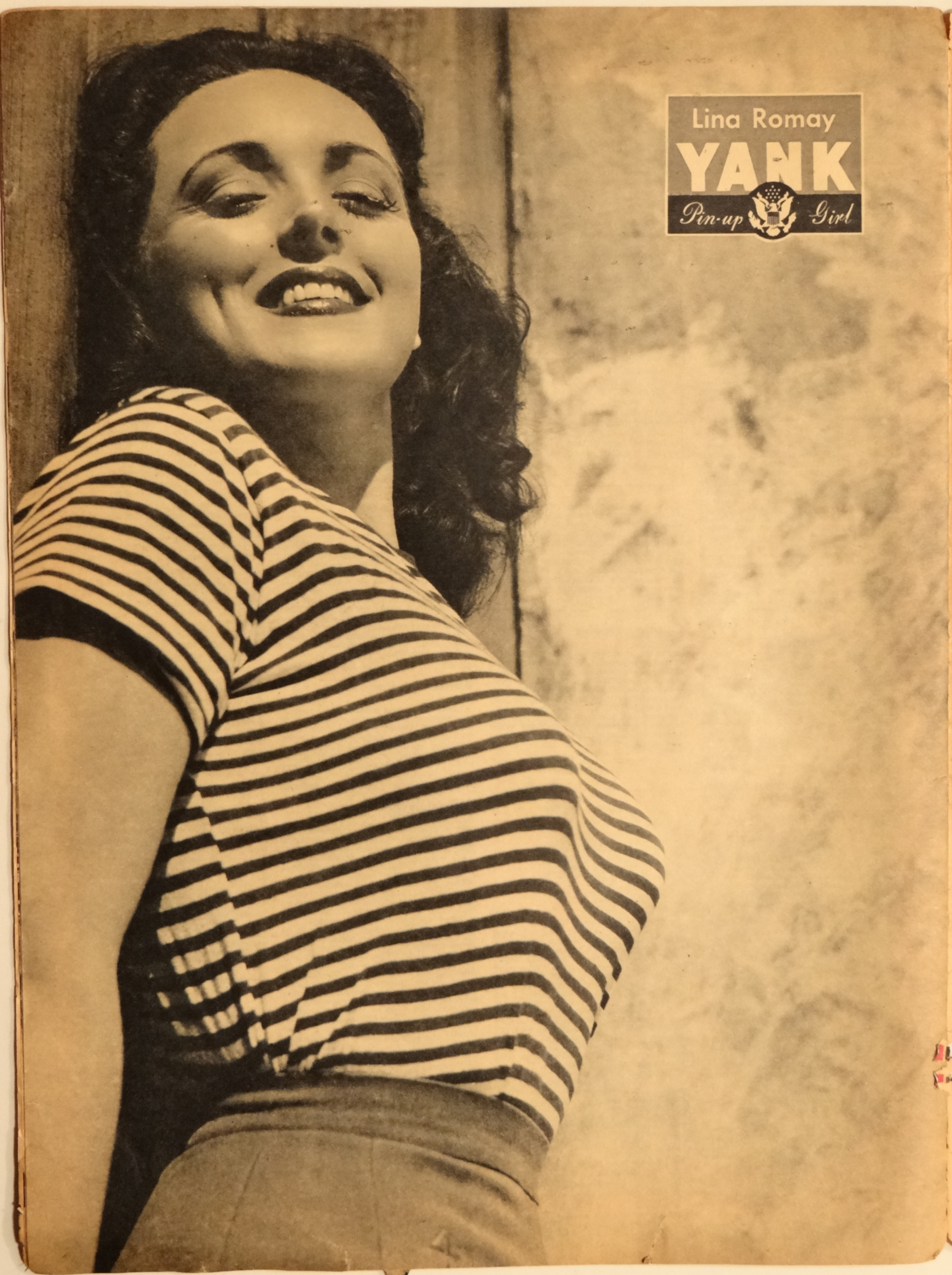
- Romay in 1945
- Born: January 16, 1919; Brooklyn, New York, U.S.
- Died: December 17, 2010 (aged 91); Pasadena, California, U.S.
- Occupations: Actress; dancer; singer
- Years active: 1942–1980
- Spouses: John Lawrence Adams (1943–1945); Jay Gould III (1953–1987); Robert O'Brien (1992-2005, his death).

Lina Romay (born Maria Elena Romay; January 16, 1919 – December 17, 2010) was an American actress and singer.

== Biography ==
She was born in 1919 in Brooklyn, New York, the daughter of Porfirio Romay, then-attaché to the Mexican Consulate in Los Angeles.

In 1943, Romay sang with Horace Heidt's orchestra, billed as Josette, a Frenchwoman.

In 1941, Romay performed with Xavier Cugat. She was featured on Cugat Rumba Revue on NBC radio in the early 1940s.

In films, Romay often appeared with Cugat and his orchestra.

She was married to John Lawrence Adams, a descendant of John Quincy Adams, who later married Lex Barker's ex-wife Constance Rhodes Thurlow. She later was the third wife of Jay Gould III, whom she married on 30 June 1953, who died in 1987. She was married to writer Robert O'Brien (1992-2005, his death).

Romay died at age 91 on December 17, 2010, of natural causes at a hospital in Pasadena, California, and was buried as Elena Gould O'Brien.

== Filmography ==
Year	Title	Role	Notes
1942	You Were Never Lovelier	Cugat band singer	With Cugat and his orchestra, uncredited
1943	Stage Door Canteen	Cugat orchestra singer	With Cugat and his orchestra, uncredited
1943	The Heat's On	Lina	With Cugat and his orchestra, uncredited
1943	Don't Get Around Much Anymore	Herself	Short
1944	Two Girls and a Sailor	Herself	With Cugat and his orchestra
1944	Bathing Beauty	Herself	With Cugat and his orchestra
1945	Week-End at the Waldorf	Juanita	With Cugat and his orchestra
1945	Adventure	Maria	
1946	Love Laughs at Andy Hardy	Isobel Gonzales	
1947	Honeymoon	Raquel Mendoza	
1947	This Time for Keeps	Singer with Cugat's Orchestra	With Cugat and his orchestra, uncredited
1948	Embraceable You	Libby Dennis	
1949	Six-Gun Music	Judy	Short
1949	Cheyenne Cowboy	Kate Harmon	Short
1949	Joe Palooka in the Big Fight	Maxine	
1949	Señor Droopy	Herself	MGM animated/live action short
1949	The Big Wheel	Dolores Raymond	
1949	The Paul Whiteman's Goodyear Revue	Regular	1949-1952
1949	The Lady Takes a Sailor	Racquel Riviera	
1953	The Man Behind the Gun	Chona Degnon	
1957	The Adventures of Ozzie & Harriet	Carmelita	Episode: "The Duenna"
1957	The Red Skelton Hour	Carmen	2 episodes, final appearance

== See also ==
- Pin-ups of Yank, the Army Weekly
