= Together? =

- Directed by: Armenia Balducci
- Written by: Armenia Balducci; Ennio De Concini
- Produced by: Gianni Bozzacchi; Valerio De Paolis
- Starring: Jacqueline Bisset; Maximilian Schell; Terence Stamp; Monica Guerritore
- Cinematography: Carlo Di Palma
- Edited by: Sam O'Steen
- Music by: Goblin; Burt Bacharach _{(alternate score: US release)}
- Release date: 1979
- Running time: 100 minutes
- Country: Italy
- Language: English

Together? (Italian: Amo non amo, also known as I Love You, I Love You Not) is a 1979 Italian drama film directed by Armenia Balducci, a screenwriter and TV documentarian at her feature debut. The Italian progressive rock band Goblin created the original score for the film before it was re-scored by Burt Bacharach for its US release. RCA Victor subsequently released Bacharach's soundtrack album with several reissues of Goblin's initial score by AMS on both CD and vinyl.

== Cast ==
- Jacqueline Bisset as Louise
- Maximilian Schell as John
- Terence Stamp as Henry
- Monica Guerritore as Giulia
- Luca Venantini as Luca
- Pietro Biondi as Berto
- Birgit Hamer as the blond girl
- Francesca De Sapio as Francesca
- Serena Canevari as Serena
- Umberto Orsini
