= Pietro Biondi =

Italian actor and voice actor

- Born: 13 October 1939 (age 86); Spoleto, Italy
- Occupations: Actor; voice actor
- Years active: 1970–present
- Spouse: Rita Di Lernia (m. 1970; died 2025)

Pietro Biondi (born 13 October 1939) is an Italian actor and voice actor.

== Biography ==
Born in Spoleto, Biondi has appeared in over 12 films and 14 television shows. He has also made numerous appearances on stage. As a voice actor, Biondi is best known for providing the Italian voice of Andy Sipowicz (portrayed by Dennis Franz) in the television show NYPD Blue as well as Caleb Nichol (portrayed by Alan Dale) in the Italian dub of The O.C.. He has also dubbed actors which include Christopher Plummer, Harvey Keitel, Donald Sutherland, Robert Duvall, Walter Matthau and J. T. Walsh in some of their work.

=== Personal life ===
Biondi was married to actress and voice actress Rita Di Lernia from 1970 until her death in 2025.

== Filmography ==
=== Cinema ===
- We Want the Colonels (1973) - Professor Pube
- The Assassination of Matteotti (1973) - Filippo Filippelli
- The Suspect (1975) - Officer of the OVRA
- Antonio Gramsci: The Days of Prison (1977)
- Together? (1979) - Berto
- Three Brothers (1981) - 1st Judge
- La posta in gioco (1988) - The Mayor
- Giovanni Falcone (1993) - Bruno Contrada 'U Dottore'
- Il giorno del giudizio (1994) - Arturo
- Ultimo bersaglio (1996) - Alvise Jesurum
- Commercial Break (1997) - Pierluigi Colombo
- The Embalmer (2002) - Deborah's Father
- Italian Dream (2007)
- Il Divo (2008) - Francesco Cossiga
- Gormiti Nature Unleashed - Animated series (2012) - Old wise man (voice)
- Dove cadono le ombre (2017) - Paul

== Voice work ==
=== Dubbed actors ===
- Christopher Plummer in A Beautiful Mind, The Lake House, Ordeal by Innocence, Muhammad Ali's Greatest Fight and Hector and the Search for Happiness
- Donald Sutherland in Disclosure, A Dry White Season, Cold Mountain, Pride & Prejudice and Horrible Bosses
- Harvey Keitel in Thelma & Louise, Pulp Fiction and Cop Land
- William Redfield in One Flew Over the Cuckoo's Nest
- Jeffrey DeMunn in The Shawshank Redemption
- Ben Gazzara in The Thomas Crown Affair
- Tom Courtenay in The Golden Compass
- Ian McKellen in Beauty and the Beast
- David Carradine in Bird on a Wire
- James Garner in Space Cowboys
- Robert Duvall in Falling Down
- Gary Busey in Point Break
- Vincent Schiavelli in Ghost
- Rip Torn in Wonder Boys
- Ken Howard in J. Edgar
- Brian Cox in Rob Roy

=== Animation ===
- Merlock in DuckTales the Movie: Treasure of the Lost Lamp
- Rick Dicker in The Incredibles
- Anton Ego in Ratatouille
- Vitruvius in The Lego Movie
