= The Art of Getting Along =

- Directed by: Luigi Zampa
- Written by: Vitaliano Brancati; Luigi Zampa
- Produced by: Gianni Hecht Lucari
- Starring: Alberto Sordi
- Cinematography: Marco Scarpelli
- Edited by: Eraldo Da Roma
- Music by: Alessandro Cicognini
- Release date: 29 December 1954
- Running time: 95 minutes
- Country: Italy
- Language: Italian

The Art of Getting Along (Italian: L'arte di arrangiarsi) is a 1954 comedy film directed by Luigi Zampa and starring Alberto Sordi. Following Difficult Years and Easy Years, it is the third and final chapter in the trilogy about Italian politics under the continuing shadow of fascism conceived by Vitaliano Brancati. In the person of an unprincipled Sicilian rogue, it delivers a satirical portrait of Italian society from 1913 to 1953.

In 2008, the film was included on the Italian Ministry of Cultural Heritage’s 100 Italian films to be saved, a list of 100 films that "have changed the collective memory of the country between 1942 and 1978."

== Plot ==
Sasà Scimoni, nephew and unpaid assistant of the mayor of Catania, adapts himself to any man who may be able to help him advance and to any woman he may be able to take advantage of. After falling for the wife of an honest socialist politician, he becomes politically active and orchestrates events that lead to the husband's imprisonment for five years. By that time, the First World War which Sasà avoids by feigning madness has come and gone. Marrying a dim but rich heiress, he becomes her brother's right-hand man in a flour milling business. When the Fascists seizes power he becomes an activist, but hastily burns his insignia after the Allies land in Sicily (one of their bombs carrying off his wife) and then profits from the black market. At a beauty parade he falls for Lilli, the winner who says she wants to get into films.

Hearing that backers of a film can make a fortune if it is a success, he persuades a dim but rich duke to promise initial finance and with Lilli as his "fiancée" heads for Rome. The public mood being strongly in favour of the Communist party, he becomes a supporter and plans a film about the workers. When the elections are however won by the Christian Democrats, the Catholic party, he promptly supports them and plans a film about a saint. The duke then declines further finance unless he can first get his capital out of the country, so Sasà finds him a church dignitary who can send money legally to foreign missions. The money ends up with Sasà, who buys farmland outside Rome, evicts squatters, and bribes an official to obtain permission for development. His machinations exposed, he gets five years in jail. On release he founds his own political party for victims of capitalism, but it wins few votes. The final shot shows him with his latest girl, in Bavarian dress, selling German razor blades off the back of a lorry.

== Cast ==
- Alberto Sordi – Rosario Scimoni
- Marco Guglielmi – Avv. Giardini
- Franco Coop – Il sindaco
- Luisa Della Noce – Paola
- Franco Jamonte – Pizzarro
- Elena Gini – Mariuccia Guardini
- Elli Parvo – Emma Scimoni
- Armenia Balducci – Lilli De Angelis
- Carlo Sposito – Duca di Lanocita (as Carletto Sposito)
- Giovanni Di Benedetto – Onorevole Toscano (as Gianni De Benedetto)
- Antonio Acqua – Ing. Casamottola
- Gino Buzzanca – Barone Mazzei

== Reception ==
Stampa Sera gave the film a positive review upon its release, describing it as "a portrait and story, with a distinctly Brancati—that is, satirical—character, of one of the many turncoats, philanderers, opportunists, or whatever you want to call them, who played their part in this final, stormy period of national history. Luigi Zampa directed with determination, and the film is both festive and biting."
