= Armenia Balducci =

Italian actress, screenwriter, and director (1933–2022)

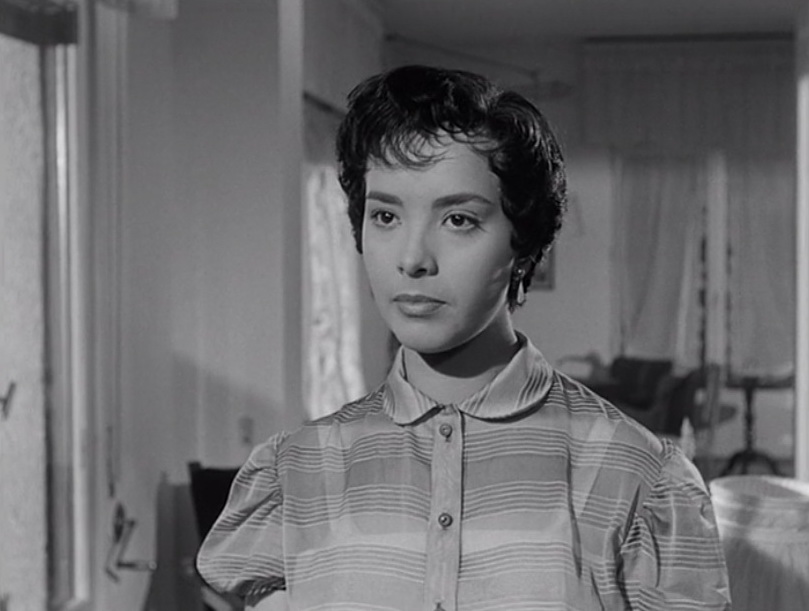
- Balducci in The Art of Getting Along (1954)
- Born: 13 March 1933; Rome, Kingdom of Italy
- Died: 29 July 2022 (aged 89); Rome, Italy
- Other names: Bella Visconti
- Occupation(s): Actress, screenwriter, film director
- Years active: 1953–1956; 1971 (as actress); 1979–2002 (as screenwriter and director)

Armenia Balducci (13 March 1933 – 29 July 2022) was an Italian actress, screenwriter and director.

== Biography ==
Balducci was elected Miss Testaccio and had a short acting career, acting under the pseudonym Bella Visconti, which spanned six films between 1953 and 1956; it was only in 1971 that she returned in front of the cameras for an appearance in Sacco & Vanzetti. She also acted in theater; she was politically active in various left-wing parties (along with her long-time partner Gian Maria Volonté) and was twice Elio Petri's editorial secretary. In 1978 and 1980 she directed two films that took a critical or satirical look at the bourgeoisie and its police representatives, but they were financial failures. From 1986 to 1993 and again in 2002 she worked as a screenwriter for Giuseppe Ferrara's films. In the latter year, her film La rivincita, shot digitally, premiered at the Tierra di Siena Film Festival.

== Filmography ==
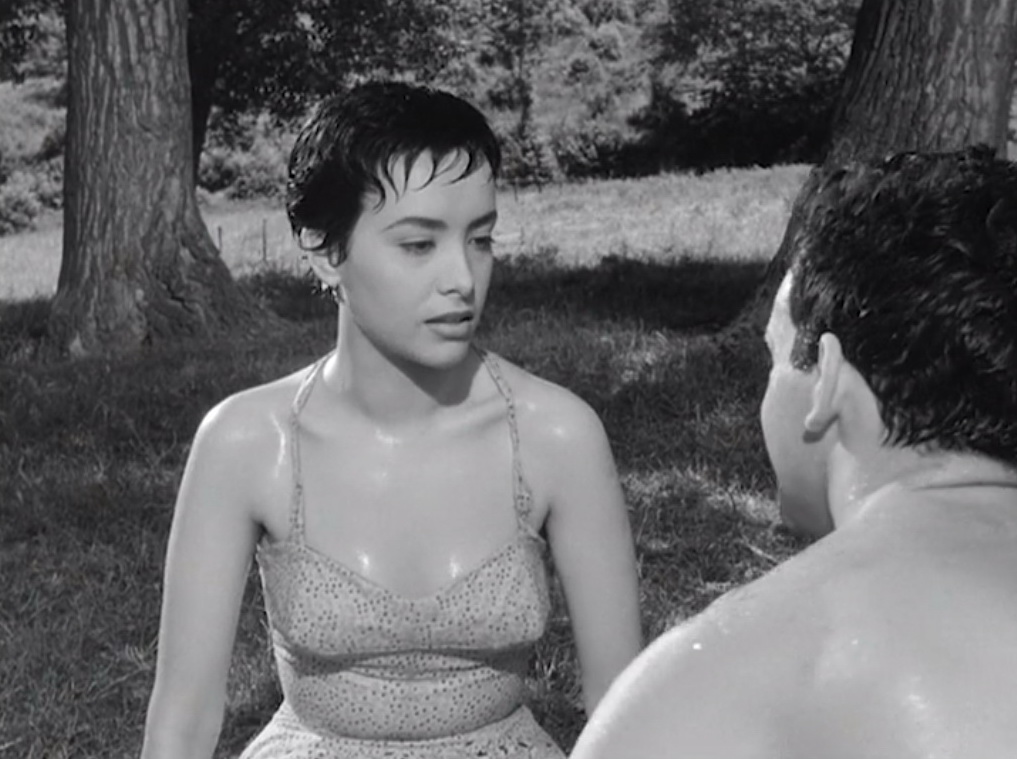
Balducci in Time of Vacation (1956)

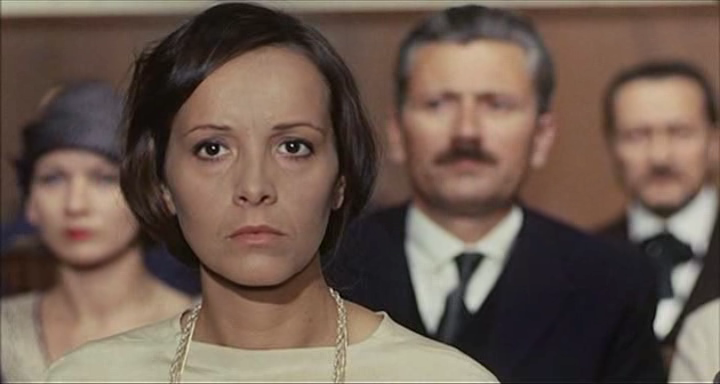
Balducci in Sacco & Vanzetti (1971)

=== As actress ===
- Easy Years (1953)
- A Day in Court (1954)
- Of Life and Love (1954)
- The Art of Getting Along (1954)
- Girls of Today (1955)
- Time of Vacation (1956)
- Sacco & Vanzetti (1971)

=== As director ===
- Together? (1979)
- Stark System (1980)
- La rivincita (2002)

=== As screenwriter ===
- Together? (1979)
- Stark System (1980)
- The Moro Affair (1986)
- Narcos (1992)
- Giovanni Falcone (1993)
- The Bankers of God: The Calvi Affair (2002)
