= Abbe Lane =

American singer and actress (1931–2026)

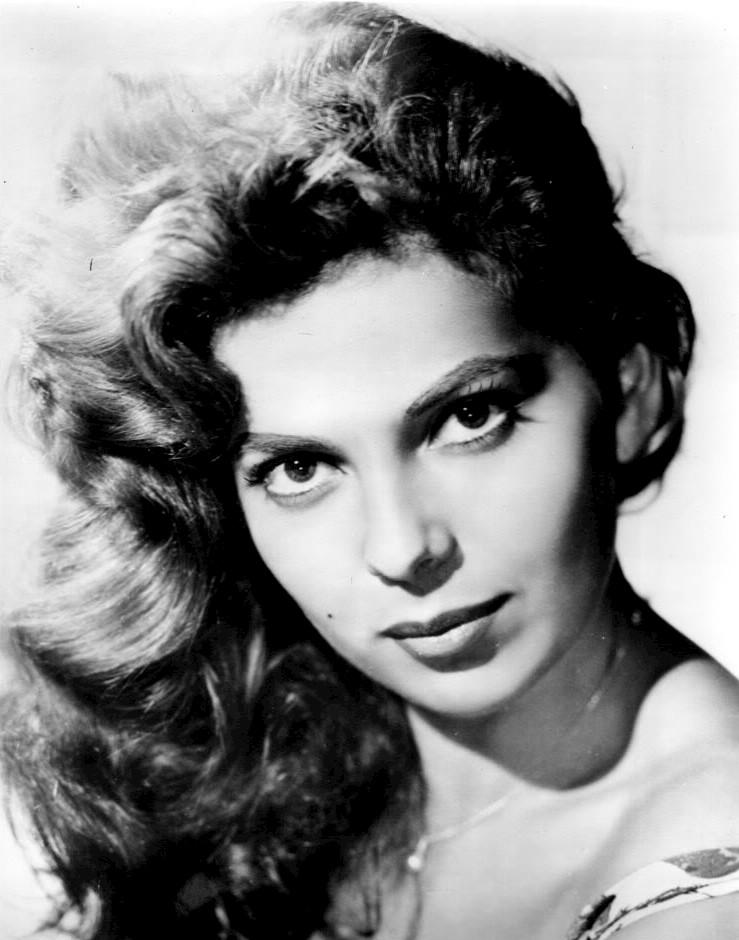
- Lane in 1961
- Born: Abigail Francine Lassman; December 14, 1931; New York City, U.S.
- Died: April 25, 2026 (aged 94); Los Angeles, California, U.S.
- Other name: Abbe Marshall
- Occupations: Singer; dancer; actress
- Known for: The Americano; Ride Clear of Diablo; Time of Vacation; Julius Caesar Against the Pirates
- Spouses: Xavier Cugat (m. 1952; div. 1964) Perry B. Leff (m. 1964; died 2020)
- Awards: Hollywood Walk of Fame

Abigail Francine Lassman (December 14, 1931 – April 25, 2026), known professionally as Abbe Lane, was an American singer and actress. Lane was known in the 1950s and 1960s for her revealing outfits and sultry style of performing. Her first marriage was as the third wife of Latin bandleader and musician Xavier Cugat, more than 30 years her senior.

== Early years ==
Lane was born Abigail Francine Lassman to Jewish parents, Abbey and Grace Lassman, in Brooklyn, New York. Her date of birth is reported variously as December 14, 1931, or December 14, 1932. Lane had a brother, Leonard. She began her career at the age of four as a child actress on Vitaphone and radio. She began dancing on Broadway in 1947 as a teenager, billed initially as Abbe Marshall. Using that name, she appeared in the Broadway shows Barefoot Boy with Cheek (1947) and As the Girls Go (1948). In 1958 she portrayed "Bobo" in Oh Captain!, starring Tony Randall.

== Acting and singing ==
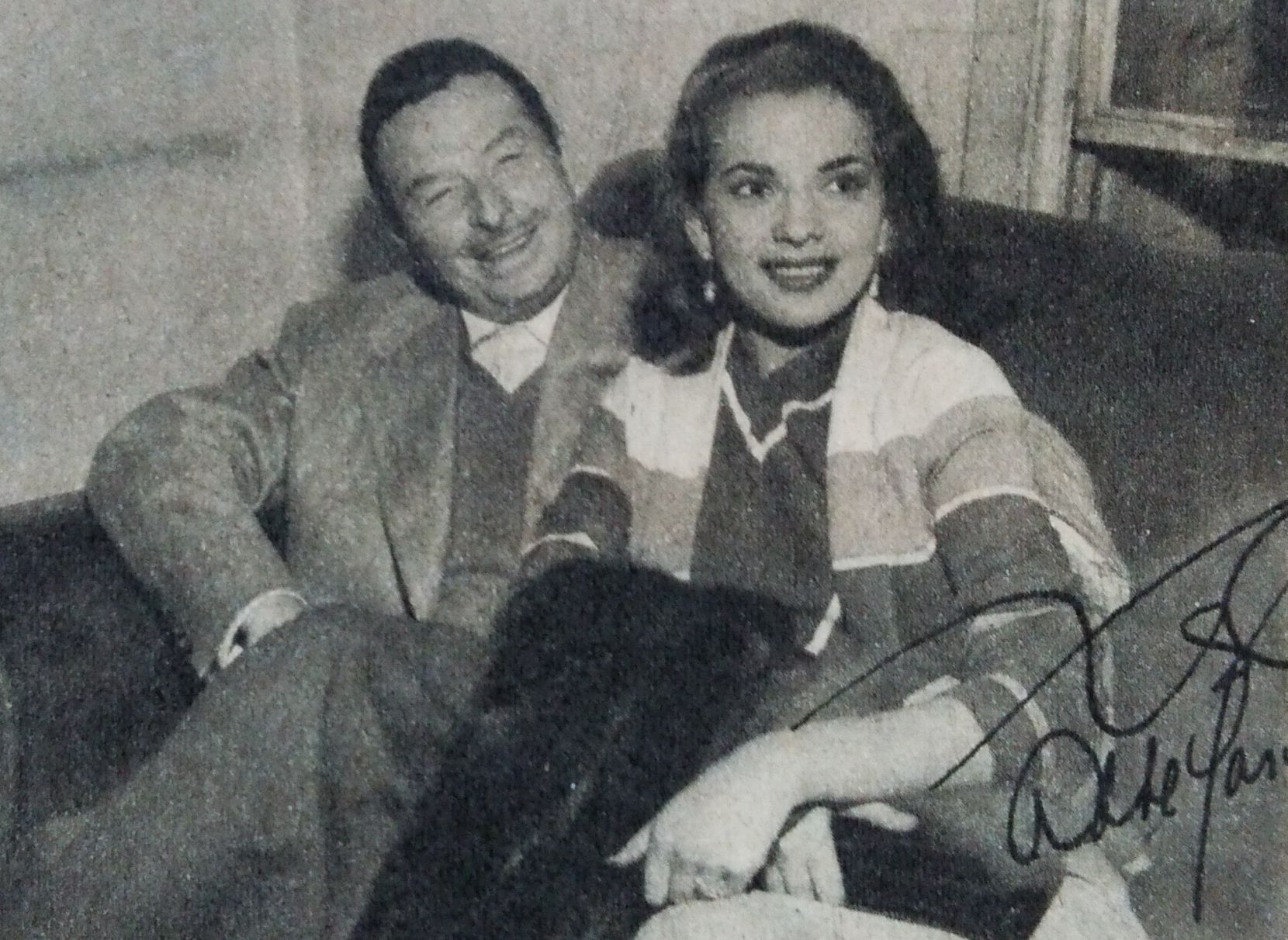
Abbe Lane and Xavier Cugat

Lane had a television program in Europe and made 21 films there early in her career. Because of her work in Europe, she was known as an actress before she became recognized for her singing and dancing.

In 1952, she married bandleader Xavier Cugat, more than 30 years her senior. During the 1950s and early 1960s she worked as a nightclub singer and was described in a 1963 magazine article as "the swingingest sexpot in show business". Cugat's influence was seen in her music, which favored Latin and rumba styles. In 1958 she starred opposite Tony Randall in the Broadway musical Oh, Captain! but her recording contract prevented her from appearing on the original cast album of the show. Eileen Rodgers performed her songs for the cast LP; Lane later recorded her songs on a solo album.

Lane made several recordings for RCA Victor and Mercury. She worked with Tito Puente on the album Be Mine Tonight released in 1958. She appeared on talk shows with Cugat until 1963. In 1964, Lane and Cugat divorced.

She attracted attention for her suggestive comments, such as "'Jayne Mansfield may turn boys into men, but I take them from there." She was the first female star of the Italian television, where she appeared in various shows starting from 1955. She said she was considered "too sexy in Italy". Her costume for an appearance on the Jackie Gleason Show was considered too revealing and she was instructed to wear something else. She was a guest on the television shows of Red Skelton, Dean Martin and Jack Benny.

In the later 1960s Lane starred in several Italian films. She performed on television variety programs such as The Ed Sullivan Show, The Steve Allen Show, The Jack Paar Program, The Mike Douglas Show, The Hollywood Palace, The Joey Bishop Show, The Merv Griffin Show and The Tonight Show starring Johnny Carson from the 1950s into the 1970s. She played guest roles in Naked City, The Man From U.N.C.L.E., The Flying Nun, F Troop, The Brady Bunch, Hart to Hart, and Vega$. Her last movie appearance was in Twilight Zone: The Movie (1983) in the minor role of an airline stewardess.

== Later years ==
In 1992, Lane wrote the semi-autobiographical novel But Where Is Love? which described the painful memories of a teenage girl married to an older man.

Lane received a star on the Hollywood Walk of Fame at 6381 Hollywood Boulevard for her contribution to television.

== Personal life and death ==
In 1952, at age 19, Lane married bandleader Xavier Cugat — who was more than 30 years her senior — as his third wife. In 1964, Lane and Cugat divorced. They had no children together during their marriage.

In December 1964, she married theatrical agent Perry Leff, remaining married until Leff's death in 2020, at age 93. Lane and Leff had two sons, Steven and Andrew.

Lane died in Los Angeles on April 25, 2026, at the age of 94.

== Discography ==
As leader:

- Be Mine Tonight, with Tito Puente and His Orchestra (RCA Victor, 1957)
- The Lady in Red, with Sid Ramin's Orchestra (RCA Victor, 1958)
- Where There's a Man, with Sid Ramin and His Orchestra (RCA Victor, 1959)
- Abbe Lane with Xavier Cugat and His Orchestra (Mercury, 1961, produced by Hal Mooney)
- The Many Sides of Abbe Lane (Mercury, 1964, produced by Hal Mooney)
- Rainbows (Butterfly Records, 1980)

With Xavier Cugat and His Orchestra:

- Dancetime with Xavier Cugat (RCA Victor, 1953)
- Ole! (Columbia, 1953)
- Cha Cha Cha (Columbia in western hemisphere and South Africa, Philips in Europe, 1955)
- Meet Xavier Cugat and Abbe Lane (10" album, Philips, 1955)
  - Compilation: Pan, Amor Y .... (RCA, 1981)

== Filmography ==
Year	Title	Role	Notes
1949	A Night of Fame		
1953	Wings of the Hawk	Elena Noriega	
1954	Ride Clear of Diablo	Kate	
1955	The Americano	Teresa	
1955	Chicago Syndicate	Connie Peters	
1956	The Wanderers	Dolores	
1956	Time of Vacation	Dolores	
1956	The Bachelor	Herself	
1956	Donatella	Herself	
1957	Parola di ladro	Lalla / Adelaide L'amour	
1957	Susana y yo	Susana Garcés	
1957	The Lady Doctor	Dottoressa Brigitte Bellomo	
1957	A sud niente di nuovo	Jane	
1958	Maracaibo	Elena Holbrook	
1958	Marinai, donne e guai	Manuela	
1959	Toto in Madrid	Eva	
1959	Sunset in Naples	Eugenia Fougère	
1959	Roulotte e roulette	Rossana Possenti	
1960	I baccanali di Tiberio	Cinthia O'Connor	
1960	My Friend, Dr. Jekyll	Mafalda	
1961	The Naked City (TV series episode)	Estelle Reeves	"The Day It Rained Mink" S2 E15: February 15, 1961
1962	Julius Caesar Against the Pirates	Plauzia	
1963	The Lightship		
1965	Burke's Law (two TV series episodes)	Melissa Hammer; Tashua Amil	
1966	The Man From U.N.C.L.E. (TV series episode)	Ayesha	"The Come with Me to the Casbah Affair" S3 E9: November 11, 1966
1967	The Cricket on the Hearth	Moll	TV movie
1968	The Flying Nun (TV series episode)	Felicia Fiero	"The Organ Transplant" S2 E6: November 7, 1968
1970	Rowan & Martin's Laugh-In (TV sketch comedy episode)		
1970	The Brady Bunch (TV series episode)	Beebee Gallini	“Mike's Horror-Scope” S1 E16: January 16, 1970
1973	Love, American Style (TV series episode)	Evelyn Carson	"Love and Other Mistakes" S5: October 26, 1973
1979	Vega$ (TV series episode)	Elizabeth Kyle	“Best Friends" S1 E16: February 7, 1979
1983	Hart to Hart (TV series episode)	Eleanor Bracken	"Straight Through the Hart"
1983	Twilight Zone: The Movie	Sr. Stewardess	(segment "Nightmare at 20,000 Feet")

== Bibliography ==
- Lane, Abbe (1992). But Where Is Love?: A Novel. Warner Books. ISBN 978-0446515986.
