= Julius Caesar Against the Pirates =

- Directed by: Sergio Grieco
- Screenplay by: Gino Mangini; Fabio De Agostini; Maria Grazia Borgiotti; Sergio Grieco
- Story by: Maria Grazia Borgiotti
- Produced by: Gastone Gugliemetti
- Starring: Gustavo Rojo; Abbe Lane; Gordon Mitchell; Piero Lulli
- Cinematography: Vincenzo Seratrice
- Edited by: Enzo Alfonzi
- Music by: Carlo Innocenzi
- Production company: C.A.P.R.I.
- Release date: 23 April 1962 (Italy)
- Running time: 93 minutes
- Country: Italy

Julius Caesar Against the Pirates (Italian: Giulio Cesare contro i pirati) is a 1962 Italian adventure film written and directed by Sergio Grieco and starring Gustavo Rojo, Abbe Lane and Gordon Mitchell. It is loosely based on actual events from the early life of Julius Caesar.

== Plot ==
It's 75 BC and Rome is in turmoil. Killers are on the loose. The dictator Lucius Cornelius Sulla Felix is having all the Roman Senators who refuse to support him murdered. Julius Caesar must flee due to his wife's Cornelia family's ties to Sulla's enemies. Caesar decides to flee Rome to the court of his friend, King Nicomedes of Bithynia. While traveling to Mileto, Caesar is captured by pirates and taken to their island fortress on the island of Formacusa. The pirates led by Hamar are engaged in hostilities with Bithynia, and Caesar swears that once he has paid his ransom of fifty talents of gold, he will return and destroy the pirates.

== Cast ==
- Gustavo Rojo as Julius Caesar
- Abbe Lane as Plauzia
- Gordon Mitchell as Hamar
- Erno Crisa as Sulla
- Rossana Fattori as Eber
- Piero Lulli as Edom
- Franca Parisi as Cornelia
- Silvana Jachino as Quintilia
- Massimo Carocci as Publius
- Ignazio Leone as Frontone
- Fedele Gentile as Valerio Torquato, Governor of Mileto
- Pasquale Basile as Tullius
- Antonio Basile as Glaucus
- Aldo Cecconi as Akim
- Mario Petri as Nicomedes
- Antonio Gradoli as Lucius
- Nando Angelini as Roman Official

== Production ==
Julius Caesar Against the Pirates was shot at INCOM studios in Rome with sea battle scenes filmed in Yugoslavia.

== Release ==
Julius Caesar Against the Pirates was released in Italy on April 23, 1962.
