= Tico-Tico no Fubá =

Popular Brazilian song (1917)

"Tico-Tico no fubá"

Song by Orquestra Colbaz
- Written: Zequinha de Abreu
- Released: 1931
- Genre: Choro
- Label: Columbia
- Lyricist: Aloysio de Oliveira
- Tico Tico no Fubá (historic 1st recording) Orquestra Colbaz. Recorded in 1931 (Columbia recording company).

"Tico-Tico no fubá" (Brazilian Portuguese: [ˈtʃiku ˈtʃiku nu fuˈba]; "rufous-collared sparrow in the cornmeal") is a Brazilian choro written by Zequinha de Abreu in 1917. Its original title was "Tico-Tico no farelo" ("sparrow in the bran"), but since Brazilian guitarist Américo Jacomino "Canhoto" (1889–1928) had a work with the same title, Abreu's work was given its present name in 1931, and sometime afterward Aloysio de Oliveira wrote the Portuguese lyrics to the instrumental original.

Outside Brazil, the song reached its peak popularity in the 1940s, with successful recordings by Ethel Smith, The Andrews Sisters (with English-language lyrics by Ervin Drake), Carmen Miranda, Alys Robi, and others.

== Notable recordings ==
The first recording of the work was made by Orquestra Colbaz (Columbia 22029, 1931).

Ethel Smith performed it on the Hammond organ in the MGM film Bathing Beauty (1944), after which her recording reached the U.S. pop charts in November 1944, peaked at No. 14 on 27 January 1945, and sold nearly two million copies worldwide.

The song was recorded by The Andrews Sisters on 7 March 1944 and it briefly reached the charts.

== In film and television ==
Year	Film/TV show	Director/Performers
1942	Saludos Amigos, "Aquarela do Brasil" segment	Norman Ferguson / Wilfred Jackson / Jack Kinney / Hamilton Luske / Bill Roberts
1942	Rio Rita	S. Sylvan Simon, Eros Volusia and her dancers
1943	Thousands Cheer	George Sidney
1944	Bathing Beauty	George Sidney, Ethel Smith
1944	Kansas City Kitty	Del Lord
1944	Abacaxi Azul	Ruy Costa
1945	The Gay Senorita	Arthur Dreifuss
1945	Club Havana	Edgar G. Ulmer
1945	It's a Pleasure	William A. Seiter
1947	Copacabana	Alfred E. Green, Carmen Miranda
1952	Tico-Tico no Fubá	Adolfo Celi
1953	Estrella sin luz	Ernesto Cortázar
1958	Yo quiero ser artista	Tito Davison
1978	The Muppet Show	Annie Sue with other pigs accompanying
1987	Radio Days	Woody Allen
1994	Radioland Murders	Mel Smith
2004	Ma vie en cinémascope	Denise Filiatrault
2006	Zuzu Angel	Sérgio Rezende
2013	Behind the Candelabra	Steven Soderbergh
2016	A Luta	Bruno Bennec
2020	Hunters	Nelson McCormick

In Quebec, the song has been used for several decades in commercials for Sico paint.

In the Mama's Family season three episode "An Ill Wind", an intoxicated Iola briefly sings the song's chorus before passing out onto a bed.

The song can be heard on various episodes of the Belgian Kabouter Wesley cartoon.

In the Narcos: Mexico season one episode "El Padrino", the orchestral version of the song is played by a band during a reception.

== Other uses ==
This song was often performed by the Grateful Dead during their tuning jams between songs. It was also played as an instrumental by James Booker with the Jerry Garcia Band.

This song was used in a Tom and Jerry cartoon in the episode "Muscle Beach Tom", in which Tom's rival, Butch is seen dancing with a female cat.

This song was performed during the closing ceremony of the 2016 Summer Olympics.

This song was adapted to the 2016 video games Just Dance 2017 and Civilization VI.

This song was remixed with a baile funk melody during the opening of Brazilian pop singer Anitta's set for Rock in Rio Lisboa 2018.

== References to the song ==
A biographical movie about Zequinha de Abreu with the same title, Tico-Tico no Fubá was produced in 1952 by the Brazilian film studio Companhia Cinematográfica Vera Cruz, starring Anselmo Duarte as Abreu.

The title phrase also features in the lyrics to the song "O Pato" made famous by João Gilberto.

In the M*A*S*H* episode "Your Hit Parade", Father Mulcahy mentions that he requested "Tico Tico", but got "May the Good Lord Bless and Keep You" instead.

== Lyrics ==
The complete version of Aloysio de Oliveira's original Portuguese lyrics:

O tico tico tá, tá outra vez aqui,
o tico tico tá comendo o meu fubá.
Se o tico tico tem, tem que se alimentar,
Que vá comer umas minhocas no pomar.
O tico tico tá, tá outra vez aqui,
o tico tico tá comendo o meu fubá.
Eu sei que ele vem viver no meu quintal,
e vem com ares de canário e de pardal.

Mas por favor tira esse bicho do celeiro,
porque ele acaba comendo o fubá inteiro.
Tira esse tico de lá, de cima do meu fubá.
Tem tanta fruta que ele pode pinicar.

Eu já fiz tudo para ver se conseguia.
Botei alpiste para ver se ele comia.
Botei um gato um espantalho e um alçapão,
mas ele acha que o fubá é que é boa alimentação.

Loose translation of the original lyrics:

The tico tico is here, it is here again,
the tico tico is eating my cornmeal.
If that tico tico has to feed itself,
it better eat a few earthworms at the orchard.
The tico tico is here, it is here again,
the tico tico is eating my cornmeal.
I know that it comes to live in my yard,
and that it puts on airs like a sparrow and a canary.

But please take this animal off my granary,
because it will end up eating all the cornmeal
Throw that tico out of here, from the top of the cornmeal (heap),
there is so much fruit to eat from.

I have done everything to see if I could,
Threw it canary feed to see if it ate it.
Let a cat loose, set up a scarecrow and a trap,
but it finds cornmeal to be good nutrition.

English version (not a translation, as sung by The Andrews Sisters):

Oh tico-tico tick!
Oh tico-tico tock!
This tico-tico - he's the cuckoo in my clock.
And when he says: "Cuckoo!" he means it's time to woo;
It's "tico-time" for all the lovers in the block.
I've got a heavy date -
a tête-à-tête at eight,
so speak, oh tico, tell me is it getting late?
If I'm on time, "Cuckoo!" but if I'm late, "Woo-woo!"
The one my heart has gone to may not want to wait!

For just a birdie, and a birdie who goes no-where,
He knows of ev'ry Lovers' Lane and how to go there;
For in affairs of the heart, my Tico's terribly smart,
He tells me: "Gently, sentiment'ly at the start!"

Oh-oh, I hear my little tico-tico calling,
Because the time is right and shades of night are falling.
I love that not-so-cuckoo cuckoo in my clock:
tico-tico tico-tico-tico tock!

== See also ==
- Latin music
- Salsa
