= Ethel Smith (organist) =

American organist

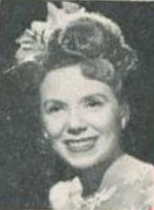
- Born: Ethel Goldsmith; November 22, 1902; Pittsburgh, Pennsylvania, U.S.
- Died: May 10, 1996 (aged 93); Palm Beach, Florida, U.S.
- Years active: c.1925–1993
- Spouses: Mr. Spiro (m. <1940); Ralph Bellamy (m. 1945–1947)

"Tico Tico" (excerpt)
Performed by Ethel Smith (1944)

Ethel Smith (born Ethel Goldsmith; November 22, 1902 – May 10, 1996) was an American organist who played primarily in a pop or Latin style on the Hammond organ. In the 1940s, she had founded the Ethel Smith Music Corporation for the publication of sheet music. She had a long recording career and appeared in many films.

== Early life and career ==
Born Ethel Goldsmith, to parents Elizabeth Bober and Max Goldsmith, she performed from a fairly young age and traveled widely, after studying both music and several languages at Carnegie Institute of Technology. She became proficient in Latin music while staying in South America, and it is the style of music with which she is now most associated.

== Film and recording career ==
Smith performed in several Hollywood films such as George White's Scandals (1945) and Melody Time (1948). In these appearances, she was known for her colorful, elaborate costumes, especially her hats. She was married to Hollywood actor Ralph Bellamy from 1945 to 1947, at the height of her fame, and their acrimonious divorce made headlines. She never had children. Around this time, she created the Ethel Smith Music Corporation for the publishing of music arrangements of popular songs.

Her rendition of "Tico Tico" became her best-known hit. She performed it in the MGM film Bathing Beauty (1944), after which her recording reached the U.S. pop charts in November 1944, peaked at #14 on January 27, 1945, and sold nearly two million copies worldwide.

"Down Yonder" was her second national hit, reaching #16 on October 27, 1951.

Smith's recording of "Monkey on a String" became the theme song for Garfield Goose and Friends, a popular children's television show in Chicago that ran from 1952 until 1976.

Smith was a guitarist as well as an organist, and in her later years occasionally played the guitar live for audiences, but all her recordings were on the organ. She recorded dozens of albums, mostly for Decca Records.

== Death ==
Smith died on May 10, 1996, at age 93.

== Selected works ==
=== 78s ===
- Teddy Bear's Picnic / Fiddle-Faddle, Decca 60.298 American Series (very rare)
- Tico Tico, Decca 23353
- Tico Tico / Lere Lero, Decca BM03571 American Series
- White Christmas / Jingle Bells, Decca BM30601 American Series
- Paran Pan Pin - Cachita / The Parrot, Decca BM03632 American Series
- Quizas, Quizas, Quizas / Made for Each Other, Decca 60.139 American Series
- Blame It on the Samba / The Green Cockatoo, Decca 60.249 American Series
- Mambo Jambo, Decca 27119
- Monkey on a String, Decca 27183
- I'm Walking Behind You / April in Portugal, Brunswick 05147
- Ethel's Birthday Party / The Wedding of the Painted Doll, Decca 60.605
- (Fifi) Bring her Out Again / Sleigh Ride, Brunswick 04517

=== LPs ===
- Ethel Smith's Hit Party, Decca DL 4803
- Souvenir Album, Decca DL 5016
- Christmas Music, Decca DL 5034
- Ethel Smith's Cha Cha Cha Album, Decca DL 8164
- Christmas Music, Decca DL 8187 (expanded version of DL 5034 above)
- Galloping Fingers, Decca DL 8456
- Latin From Manhattan, Decca DL 8457
- Miss Smith Goes to Paris, Decca DL 8640
- Dance to the Latin Rhythms of Ethel Smith, Decca DL 8712
- Waltz With Me, Decca DL 8735
- Lady Fingers, Decca DL 8744
- Bright and Breezy, Decca DL 8799
- Ethel Smith Swings Sweetly, Decca DL 74095
- The Many Moods of Ethel Smith, Decca DL 74145
- Make Mine Hawaiian, Decca DL 74236
- Lady of Spain, Decca DL 74325
- Rhythm Antics!, Decca DL 74414
- At the End of a Perfect Day, Decca DL 74467
- Hollywood Favorites, Decca DL 74618
- Ethel Smith's Hit Party, Decca DL 74803
- Seated One Day at the Organ, Decca DL 78902
- Bouquet of the Blues, Decca DL 78955
- Ethel Smith on Broadway, Decca DL 78993
- Ethel Smith, Vocalion VL 3669
- Organ Holiday, Vocalion VL 73778
- Silent Night—Holy Night, Vocalion VL 73882
- Parade, MCA Coral CB 20021

=== CDs ===
- Tico Tico, Living Era AJA-5506 (2004). A compilation of early releases from 1944 to 1952
- The Fabulous Organ Music of Ethel Smith, MCA MSD-35255 (out of print as of December 2005)
- The First Lady of the Hammond Organ: Plays "Tico Tico" & Other Great Recordings, Jasmine Music (2003). A 2-CD compilation of early recordings

=== Films ===
- Bathing Beauty (1944)
- Twice Blessed (1945) as herself
- George White's Scandals (1945)
- Cuban Pete (1946)
- Easy to Wed (1946) as herself
- Melody Time: Blame It on the Samba (1948) as herself
- C'mon, Let's Live a Little (1967)
- The Sidelong Glances of a Pigeon Kicker (1970)
- Wicked, Wicked (1973)

=== Music books ===
- The Ethel Smith Hammond Organ Method Book One, Revised Edition, Copyright 1949 and 1964 By Ethel Smith Music Corp. New York, NY. For use on every Hammond Organ including all Spinet Models.
