= Carlos Ramírez (singer) =

Colombian singer

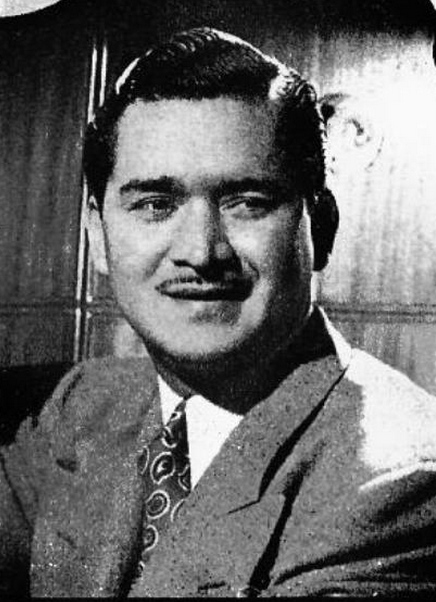
Carlos Ramirez in a 1944 advertisement

Carlos Julio Ramírez (August 4, 1916 in Tocaima, Cundinamarca – December 12, 1986 in Miami, Florida) was a Colombian baritone who became a MGM Studios contract actor in Hollywood during the 1940s.

== Filmography ==
Year	Title	Role	Notes
1944	Two Girls and a Sailor	Himself	
1944	Bathing Beauty	Himself	
1945	Where Do We Go from Here?	Benito	
1945	Anchors Aweigh	Carlos	
1945	The Three Caballeros	Himself	Vocal performance
1946	Night and Day	Specialty Singer of Song "Begin the Beguine" Number	
1946	Easy to Wed	Himself	
1952	Magical Maestro	Voice of Poochini	Animated short film
1953	Nadie lo sabrá	Carlitos	
1955	La gran obsesión		Final film role
