= Dorothy Kingsley =

American screenwriter

- Kingsley in the 1940s
- Born: October 14, 1909; New York City, New York, U.S.
- Died: September 26, 1997 (aged 87); Monterey, California, U.S.
- Occupation: Screenwriter
- Spouse(s): first husband unknown William Durney (? – 1989) his death
- Children: 6
- Parent: Alma Hanlon

Dorothy Kingsley (October 14, 1909 – September 26, 1997) was an American screenwriter, who worked extensively in film, radio, and television.

== Biography ==
Born in New York City, Kingsley was the daughter of newspaperman and press agent Walter J. Kingsley and silent-film actress Alma Hanlon. Following their divorce, Hanlon remarried director Louis Myll. They lived in Bayside, Queens, for two years and later moved with Dorothy to the affluent suburb of Grosse Pointe, Michigan.

Kingsley also had an unsuccessful first marriage. As a young divorced mother of three, while recuperating from a severe case of the measles, she listened to all the radio programs and began to think that she could write better material than what she was hearing. She went to Los Angeles to visit a friend and made the rounds to numerous agents with material she had written for various radio stars such as Jack Benny. Her youthful appearance worked against her, but she finally found an agent who would take a chance on her. Kingsley went home and packed up her children, but on her return to Los Angeles she found that the agent had gone out of business.

=== Radio ===
While Kingsley unsuccessfully shopped for agents again, she happened to meet Constance Bennett socially. Bennett thought that Kingsley's material was better than her current supply and used a couple of Kingsley's gags on her radio program. Despite the size of the program's writing staff, Kingsley began supplying gags under the table for $75 a week, but eventually the representative who was paying her for the material left, and she was again unemployed. Kingsley answered a newspaper ad to write gags for Edgar Bergen, and as a result she was chosen from 400 entries for a one-month trial period at $50 a week. The "Edgar Bergen Show" became one of the top-rated programs, and Kingsley stayed with the show for several years.

=== MGM ===
It was while she was with the Bergen radio show that Kingsley started submitting scripts to studios. Arthur Freed at MGM thought she had promise and wanted to put her under contract at double what Bergen was paying. Bergen was notorious for underpaying his talent, and when he found out, she was dismissed. Her first assignment was a production rewrite on Girl Crazy, a Mickey Rooney/Judy Garland musical. The current writer was otherwise occupied, so Freed asked her to go down to the set and just do a little work. Kingsley soon developed the ability to fix an ailing script during production, and while she was working on Girl Crazy, producer Jack Cummings was having a lot of trouble with Bathing Beauty and asked her to fix that as well. Many people had already worked on the weak script whose musical numbers had been shot but had no story. It was the first picture for Esther Williams as a lead and became a big hit.

Kingsley often worked without credit; and though hers was usually a co-credit, she normally worked alone, before or after the other screenwriters had finished up. Kingsley wrote many of the great MGM musicals such as Kiss Me Kate, as well as a number of scripts for Debbie Reynolds and three quarters of all the Esther Williams pictures. The grand spectacle pictures were very popular during the war years, when people desperately wanted escapist entertainment. In 1948 Kingsley and fellow screenwriter Dorothy Cooper wrote A Date with Judy, which was a pivotal film for Elizabeth Taylor who, after playing frail juvenile roles, was given the part of a manipulative modern flirt who saw a school campus as merely husband-hunting grounds.

Kingsley, a devout Catholic, wrote the baseball picture Angels in the Outfield, President Eisenhower's favorite picture, which featured the Pittsburgh Pirates. He ran it so many times that the staff said, “Please, Mr. President, not again."

She was the last of the writers to work on the script for Stanley Donen's Seven Brides for Seven Brothers after Albert Hackett and Frances Goodrich. Their original script was based on the short story The Sobbin' Women by Stephen Vincent Benét, but the script wasn't coming out right. From Kingsley:

"Stanley Donen called me in and I looked at the script and said, 'The big trouble in the original short story is that the Howard Keel character is the one that tries to get all of these boys married off, and that’s not right. The girl has nothing to do, and she’s got to be the one to engineer all this stuff.' That was changed around and seemed to please everyone, and we went from there."

After she had been at MGM for a while, Kingsley acquired the reputation as a fixer during production. She would regularly be called down to the set to fix pictures on the fly when the original writers were no longer on the scene to be consulted. The studio kept her working all the time, and her contract was continually being extended.

=== Sinatra ===
Columbia was set to produce Pal Joey, a perfect vehicle for Frank Sinatra; however, Sinatra and Columbia executive Harry Cohn had been feuding for years and didn't speak to each other. Kingsley and Lillian Burns, the assistant to Harry Cohn, wrote a synopsis of the film with Sinatra in mind and had it sent to Sinatra without Cohn's involvement. Sinatra agreed to do the picture, and Cohn committed without ever seeing the script. Sinatra was so pleased with what Kingsley had done with Pal Joey, he committed to Can-Can without a script.

== Later life and death ==
In 1969 she was instrumental in creating the Bracken's World series for television, based on the behind-the-scenes activities at the fictitious Century Pictures in Hollywood.

Kingsley and her second husband, William Durney, left Hollywood for Carmel, California, where they started the Durney Vineyard winery. They were among the earliest vintners in the Carmel Valley wine region when they planted their original vineyards in 1968, with the first wines being produced in 1976.

Dorothy Kingsley died of heart failure in 1997 in Monterey, California. She is buried in San Carlos Cemetery in Monterey, California

== Filmography ==
- Look Who's Laughing (1941, material for Edgar Bergen)
- Here We Go Again (1942, material: Edgar Bergen)
- Girl Crazy (1943, contributing writer, uncredited
- Best Foot Forward (1943, contributing writer, uncredited)
- Bathing Beauty (1944, screenplay)
- Broadway Rhythm (1944, screenplay)
- Easy to Wed (1946, adaptation)
- A Date with Judy (1948, writer)
- On an Island with You (1948, writer)
- Neptune's Daughter (1949, writer)
- Two Weeks with Love (1950, screenplay)
- The Skipper Surprised His Wife (1950, writer)
- Angels in the Outfield (1951, screenplay)
- Texas Carnival (1951, screenplay, story)
- It's a Big Country (1951, segment 7)
- When in Rome (1952, writer)
- Kiss Me Kate (1953, screenplay)
- Small Town Girl (1953, screenplay)
- Dangerous When Wet (1953, writer)
- Seven Brides for Seven Brothers (1954, writer)
- Jupiter's Darling (1955, writer)
- Pal Joey (1957, screenplay)
- Don't Go Near the Water (1957, writer)
- Green Mansions (1959, writer)
- Pepe (1960, writer)
- Can-Can (1960, writer)
- Half a Sixpence (1967, adaptation)
- Valley of the Dolls (1967, screenplay)
- Debbie Reynolds and the Sound of Children (1969, writer)
- Bracken's World episode "Fade In" (1969, writer)
- Bracken's World episode "The Stunt" (1969, writer)
- Bracken's World episode "Fade-In" (1969, writer)
