= Zequinha de Abreu =

Brazilian musician and composer (1880–1935)

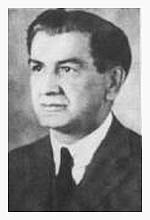
Zequinha de Abreu

Zaccarias (Lyrio Panicalli): Tico-Tico no Fubá, 1943

José Gomes de Abreu, better known as Zequinha de Abreu (September 19, 1880 – January 22, 1935), was a Brazilian musician and composer.

Abreu was born in Santa Rita do Passa Quatro, São Paulo state. He is best known for the famous choro tune "Tico-Tico no Fubá" (1917), whose original title was "Tico-Tico no Farelo". Other well-known tunes he wrote were "Branca" and "Tardes em Lindóia."

Tico-Tico is played in various melodic versions all over the world. Abreu died in São Paulo, aged 54.
