= Sanitarium =

Sanitarium or sanatorium may refer to:

== Facilities ==
- Sanatorium, medical facility for stay during long-term illness and convalescence
- Battle Creek Sanitarium, American health resort founded in 1866
- Sanitarium Health and Wellbeing Company, major food company in Australia and New Zealand

== Film and video games ==
- The Sanitarium (film), a 1910 American silent comedy short starring Fatty Arbuckle
- Sanitarium (video game), American 1998 point-and-click adventure
- Sanitarium (film), a 2013 American horror anthology film

== Localities ==
- Sanitarium, California, American unincorporated community in Napa County
- Sanatorium, Mississippi, American village near Magee

== Music ==
- "Welcome Home (Sanitarium)", 1986 song by American heavy metal band Metallica
- Sanatorium (band), North Macedonia thrash metal band from Skopje, formed in 1987
