= Antonio Acqua =

Italian actor (1893–1966)

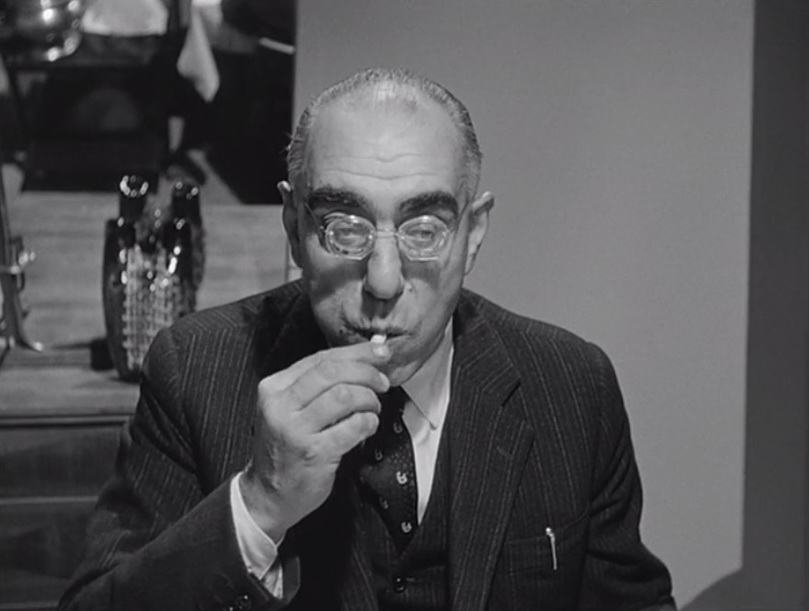
Acqua in The Art of Getting Along (1954)

Antonio Acqua (5 November 1893 - 18 October 1966) was an Italian actor of the 1940s, 1950s and 1960s.

Born in Rome, Acqua was mainly active on stage and in films as a character actor, specialized in roles of lawyers, military officers, politicians and engineers. He frequently worked with Pietro Germi, who gave him some of the most significant roles of his career. His only leading role was as the General in Enrico Cappellini's La via del Sud (1953).

== Selected filmography ==
- Don Cesare di Bazan (1942)
- The Jester's Supper (1942)
- It Takes Two to Sin in Love (1954)
