= Xavier Cugat =

Catalan-American musician and bandleader (1900–1990)

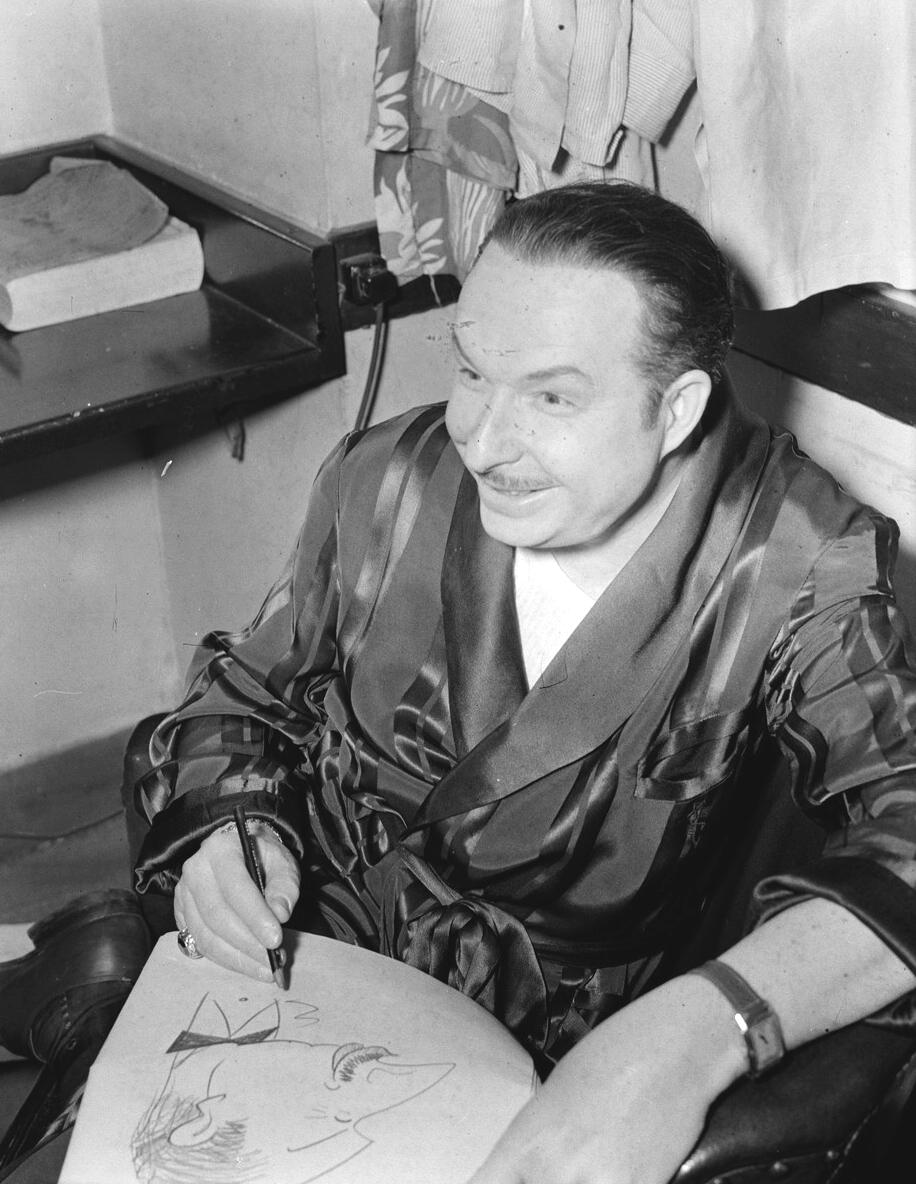
- Cugat in New York City c. 1946-48
- Born: Francesc d'Assís Xavier Cugat Mingall de Bru i Deulofeu, 1 January 1900; Girona, Catalonia, Spain
- Died: 27 October 1990 (aged 90); Barcelona, Catalonia, Spain
- Resting place: Cementeri de Girona, Girona, Catalonia, Spain
- Occupations: Musician; singer; actor; director; screenwriter; bandleader
- Years active: 1925–1970
- Spouses: Carmen Castillo (m. 1929; div. 1946) Lorraine Allen (m. 1947; div. 1952) Abbe Lane (m. 1952; div. 1963) Charo (m. 1966; div. 1978)
- Relatives: Francis Cugat (brother)
- Awards: Creu de Sant Jordi (1990)

Xavier Cugat (/ˈzeɪviər kuːɡɑːt/; Catalan: [ʃəβiˈe kuˈɣat]; 1 January 1900 – 27 October 1990) was an American musician and bandleader who was a leading figure in the spread of Latin music in the United States. Originally from Girona, Catalonia in Spain, he spent his formative years in Havana, Cuba, before arriving in New York City in 1915. A trained violinist and arranger, he was the leader of the resident orchestra at the Waldorf–Astoria hotel from 1933 to 1949 and a prolific recording artist for 40 years. He became known as the "Rumba King." A restaurateur in West Hollywood and New York, he and his band appeared in numerous motion pictures in the 1930s and 1940s. He was also a caricature artist.

== Early life ==
Xavier Cugat was born with the Catalan name Francesc d'Assís Xavier Cugat Mingall de Bru i Deulofeu, or, more simply in standard form with his mother's name last, Xavier Cugat i Mingall in Girona, Catalonia in Spain on 1 January 1900. He identified as Catalan his entire life. His family immigrated to Cuba when he was three years old. He studied classical violin and worked as a violinist at the age of nine in a silent movie theater to help pay for his education. He was first violin for the Teatro Nacional Symphonic Orchestra in Havana. When he was not performing, he started drawing caricatures. On 6 July 1915 he and his family arrived in New York City on the SS Havana.

Cugat regularly embellished his life history as a strategy of self-promotion, sometimes making it difficult to determine the facts of his life. For example, it was regularly reported that, while still in Havana, Cugat became friends with Enrico Caruso and appeared in recitals with him, but, in a careful analysis, Galina Bakhtiarova showed that that was impossible. Cugat's 1948 autobiography Rumba is My Life describes in detail an interaction with Caruso in Havana, apparently entirely fictional; Caruso did not visit Havana until 1920. Similarly, in his 1981 autobiography, Cugat claimed, and it was widely reported, that he was married to the star of the Cuban musical theater Rita Montaner from 1918 to about 1920, but Bakhtiarova pointed out that a well-sourced biography of Montaner shows that was not possible.

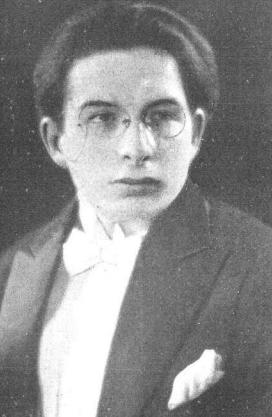
Xavier Cugat in May 1924

From the late 1910s to early 1920s, Cugat was beginning a career as a violinist. It was a difficult career choice. He appeared in concerts in Carnegie Hall in 1920 and 1922. He performed on WDY radio, Camden, N.J., in 1921, becoming one of the first solo musicians to play on radio. In the early 1920s he traveled to Europe to continue studying the violin, performing recitals throughout Europe, including a tour in Spain in fall 1924. He returned to New York disappointed at his prospects of becoming a professional violinist. Offered a job to assist an art and antiques dealer in selling Spanish art on the U.S. West Coast, Cugat drove a car-load of paintings to Los Angeles and worked at a gallery there around 1924-5.

== Early career ==
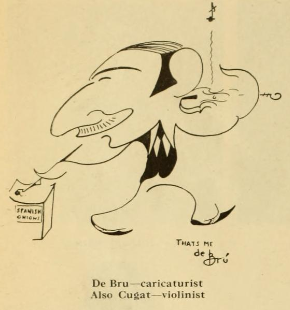
Self-caricature of Cugat, aka De Bru, Photoplay Magazine, November 1927

In Los Angeles he was a featured soloist with the Los Angeles Philharmonic. His career as a classical violinist not going as well as expected, Cugat began working for the Los Angeles Times as a caricaturist around 1924-1925. His caricatures were nationally syndicated. They appeared in Photoplay magazine beginning in November 1927, under the byline "de Bru." (His older brother, Francis, was an artist of some note, having painted cover art for F. Scott Fitzgerald's novel The Great Gatsby.) Assigned to create a caricature of the Mexican star Dolores del Río, he accidentally drew her double instead, Carmen Castillo. He became friends with Castillo, and they began socializing, with Cugat putting together a small band for parties at her house. The band began performing professionally, and Cugat married Castillo in 1929. Cugat would draw caricatures throughout his life.

By the late 1920s, the band led by Cugat was often playing at the Cocoanut Grove, a club in the Ambassador Hotel, Los Angeles. Cugat's friend, Charlie Chaplin, visited the club to dance the tango, so Cugat added tangos to the band's performances. Seeing how popular the dance was becoming, Cugat convinced the owner to hire South American dancers to give tango lessons. This, too, became popular, and Cugat made the dancers part of his orchestra, now called "Xavier Cugat and His Gigolos". In May 1928 he turned his act into a short film of the same name.

== Latin band leader ==
For more than 30 years Cugat shuttled between New York and Los Angeles, conducting Latin music on both coasts of the United States. In 1931, he took his band to New York for the opening of the Waldorf–Astoria hotel. In 1933 he replaced Jack Denny as leader of the hotel's resident band. For the next sixteen years, until 1949, he led the Waldorf-Astoria Orchestra. One of his trademark gestures was to hold a chihuahua while he waved his baton with the other arm. For the opening act of any performance, he would invariably play the theme My Shawl that he had composed based on Catalan folk music.

External image
- Xavier Cugat conducts his orchestra at the Waldorf-Astoria Hotel's Sert Room in 1938; Life Magazine

External audio
- Xavier Cugat conducting the Waldorf Astoria Orchestra with his wife Carmen Castillo singing his song "Yours" in the 1940's Archive.org

In 1941 a legal dispute initiated by the American Society of Composers, Authors and Publishers proved to be a boon to Cugat's band. The society banned its music from being broadcast after a dispute with the networks over fees. This greatly limited the songs that most bands could play on the air, but Cugat was able form play lists using a library of more than 500 non-society Latin tunes. He was signed to a popular radio program with dance bands, Camel Caravan, which enhanced his national reputation.

Throughout the 1930s and 1940s Cugat was known as the "King of the Rumba". He was foremost a natural entertainer and showman, and a musician second. He took pride that people enjoyed and danced to his music, making them feel good and happy. Cugat followed trends closely, making records for the conga, the mambo, the cha-cha-cha, and the twist when these dances were popular. In 1940 his recording of "Perfidia" became a hit. In 1943, Cugat's recording of "Brazil" was his most successful chart hit. It spent seven weeks at No. 2 on the Billboard magazine National Best Selling Retail Records chart (behind Harry James's song "I've Heard That Song Before"). Cugat performed and recorded the Cuban classic "The Peanut Vendor" (El Manisero) with many artists throughout his career.

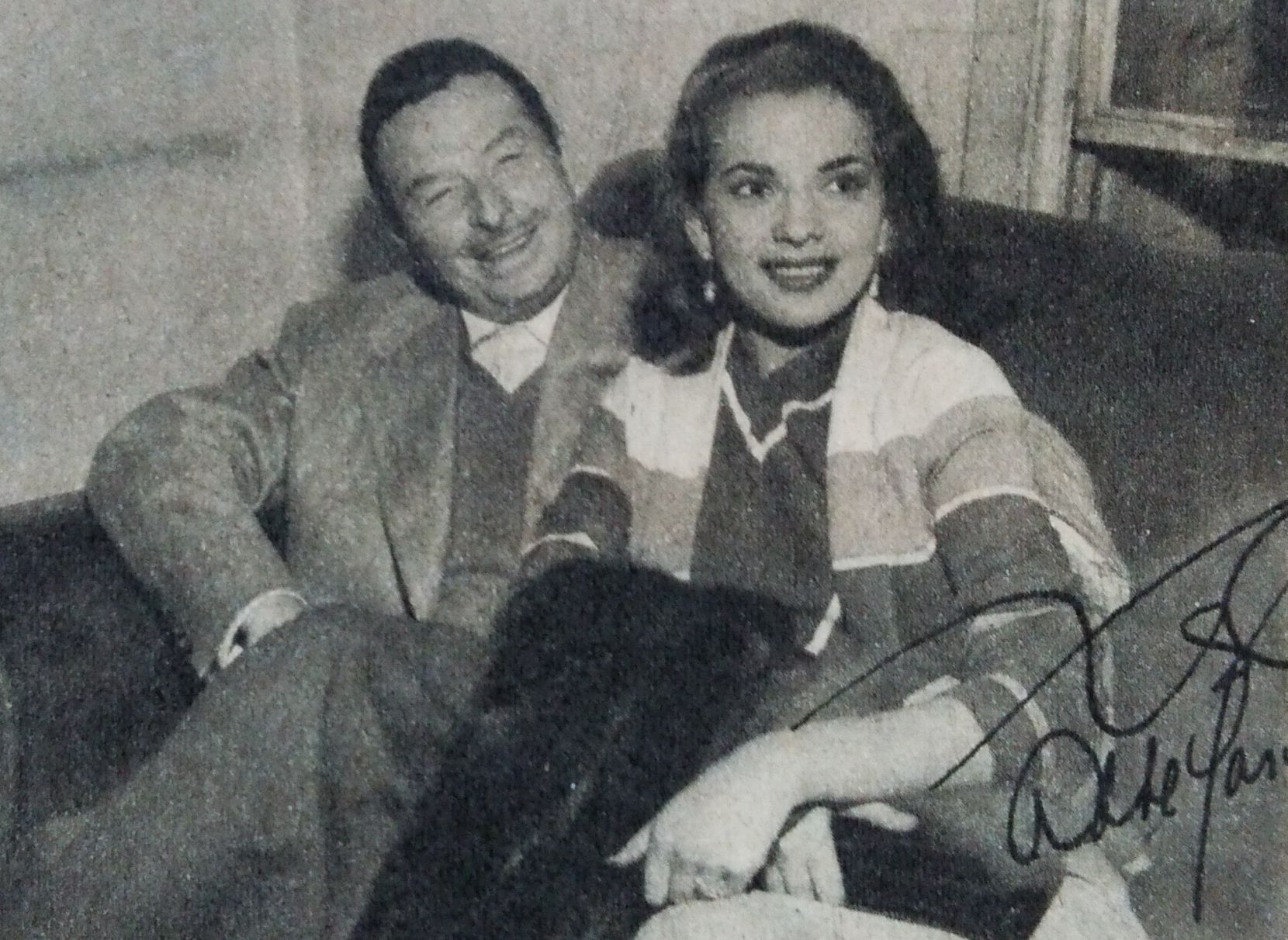
Abbe Lane and Xavier Cugat during a 1953 visit to Japan

Cugat recorded prolifically: for Columbia in the 1940s and 1950s, RCA Victor in the 1930s and 1950s, Mercury in 1951–52 and the 1960s, and Decca in the 1960s. Dinah Shore made her first recordings as a vocalist with Cugat in 1939 and 1940 for RCA Victor. After seeing Desi Arnaz perform, Cugat hired him for his touring orchestra, playing the conga drum and singing. Arnaz became a star attraction, and Cugat encouraged him to start his own band, the Desi Arnaz Orchestra. In 1945 Frank Sinatra and Bing Crosby recorded with the Cugat orchestra. In the 1950s he made several recordings with his wife, singer Abbe Lane. His orchestra also included Lina Romay, Tito Rodriguez, Yma Sumac, and Miguelito Valdés. Cugat directed over 150 recordings with the Waldorf-Astoria Orchestra between 1937 and 1942. According to Time Magazine, in 1942 Cugat was making a half million dollars (equivalent to 10 million in 2024) a year as orchestra leader.

== Restaurateur ==
Beginning in the 1940s, Cugat owned and operated the Mexican restaurant Casa Cugat on La Cienega Boulevard in West Hollywood. The restaurant was frequented by Hollywood celebrities and featured two singing guitarists who would visit each table and play diners' favorite songs upon request. The restaurant closed in 1986.

In 1958 Cugat opened another "Casa Cugat" restaurant in New York City, featuring Spanish, Cuban, and Mexican cuisine, but the restaurant lasted only a year.

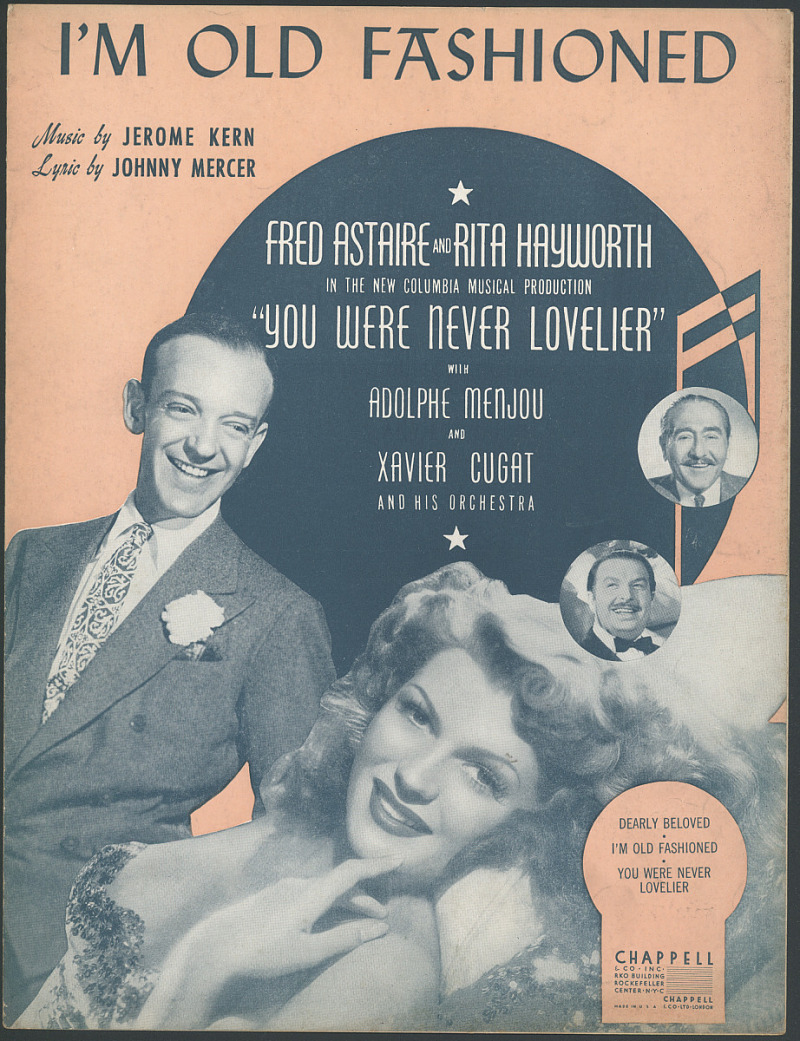
Sheet music cover for the song "I'm Old Fashioned" from the 1942 film You Were Never Lovelier, starring Fred Astaire, Rita Hayworth, and featuring Xavier Cugat.

== Career in films ==
The popularity of Cugat and his orchestra led to appearances in films, such as: In Gay Madrid (1930), Go West, Young Man (1936) with Mae West, You Were Never Lovelier (1942), Week-End at the Waldorf (1945), Holiday in Mexico (1946), A Date with Judy (1948), and Chicago Syndicate (1955). Cugat's restaurant appears in the 1943 film The Heat's On, also starring Cugat as himself.

Cugat appeared in series of motion pictures with the competitive swimmer and actress Esther Williams and her outsized swimming pools, including Bathing Beauty (1944), This Time for Keeps (1947), On an Island with You (1948), and Neptune's Daughter (1949). His restaurant's exterior and a fanciful depiction of its interior can be found in scenes of Neptune's Daughter, in which Cugat has a substantial role playing himself. The movie was a hit, and Cugat's appearance in it made him a household name.

== Personal life and death ==
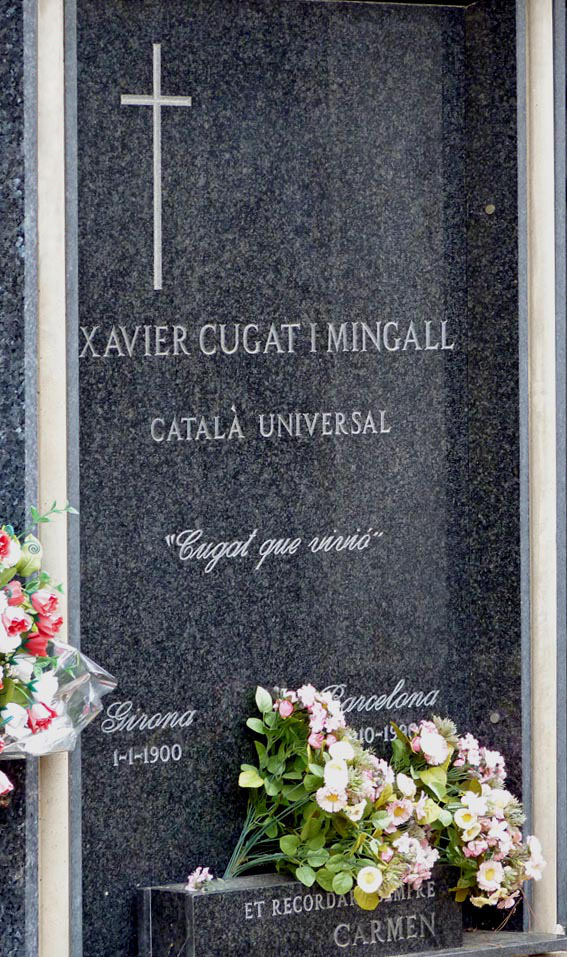
Xavier Cugat's tomb in Girona's cemetery

Cugat was married four times. His first marriage was to his band vocalist Carmen Castillo (1929–46), his second to actress Lorraine Allen (1947–52), his third to singer Abbe Lane (1952–64), and his fourth to Spanish guitarist and comic actress Charo Baeza, stage name Charo, (1966–78). Cugat fathered no children.

Cugat became a naturalized American citizen in 1941. He was the author of two autobiographies, Rumba is my Life (1948), and Yo Cugat: Mis primeros 80 Años (I Cugat: My first 80 years) (1981), published in Spain.

After a stroke left him partially paralyzed in 1969, in 1972 Cugat returned to Catalonia, living in a suite at the Ritz Barcelona hotel. The hotel has been known since 2005 as the El Palace Barcelona hotel, maintaining a "Cugat Room". Despite ongoing heart and lung ailments, at age 86 he formed a new 16-piece band and began touring Spain. He died of heart failure on 27 October 1990 at age 90 at the Quiron Clinic in Barcelona. He was buried in his native Girona.

== Legacy ==
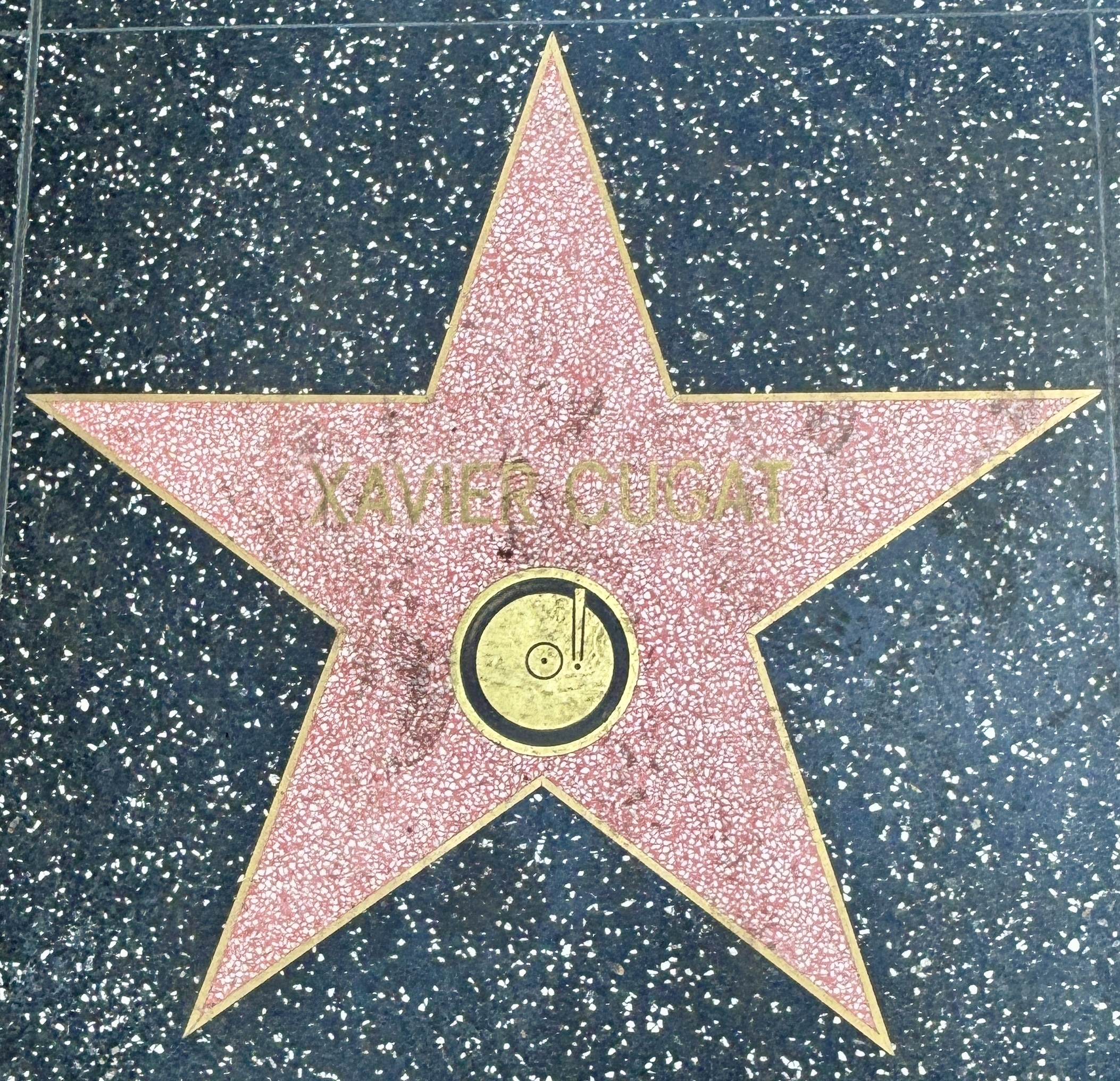
Hollywood Walk of Fame star (music)

In 1960 Cugat was honored with two stars on the Hollywood Walk of Fame, one on the west side of the 1600 block of Vine Street for music, and another on the east side of the 1500 block of Vine for television. In 2001 he was posthumously inducted into the International Latin Music Hall of Fame.

In 1988 the town of Girona named a wide boulevard through the neighborhood of Fontajau as the Rambla Xavier Cugat in his honor. In 1990 the Generalitat of Catalonia awarded Cugat the Creu de Sant Jordi (Cross of Saint George).

The New Xavier Cugat Orchestra continued to play Cugat's music for another 20 years after his retirement. Piano player Robert Kasha purchased the bandleader’s name, music and rights to the band from Cugat, and Kasha played piano for the new band, led by his wife, singer Ada Cavallo. Cugat's material was donated to The Jazz Loft museum in Stony Brook, New York in 2019.

Cugat's recordings continue to be used in films. Several songs that he recorded, including a 1960's re-recording of his previous hit "Perfidia", were used in the Wong Kar-wai films Days of Being Wild (1990) and 2046 (2004). His song "Cui Cui" was used in the animated film Happy Feet (2006), while Cugat's signature song "My Shawl" was featured in the film Kit Kittredge: An American Girl (2008).

Cugat was the subject of a 2016 Spanish biographical film Sexo, Maracas y Chihuahuas, in Spanish or Catalan. The film, 1 hr 27 min duration, was written and directed by Diego Mas Trelles.

The personal papers and other personal and professional material of Xavier Cugat are preserved in the Library of Catalonia in Barcelona.

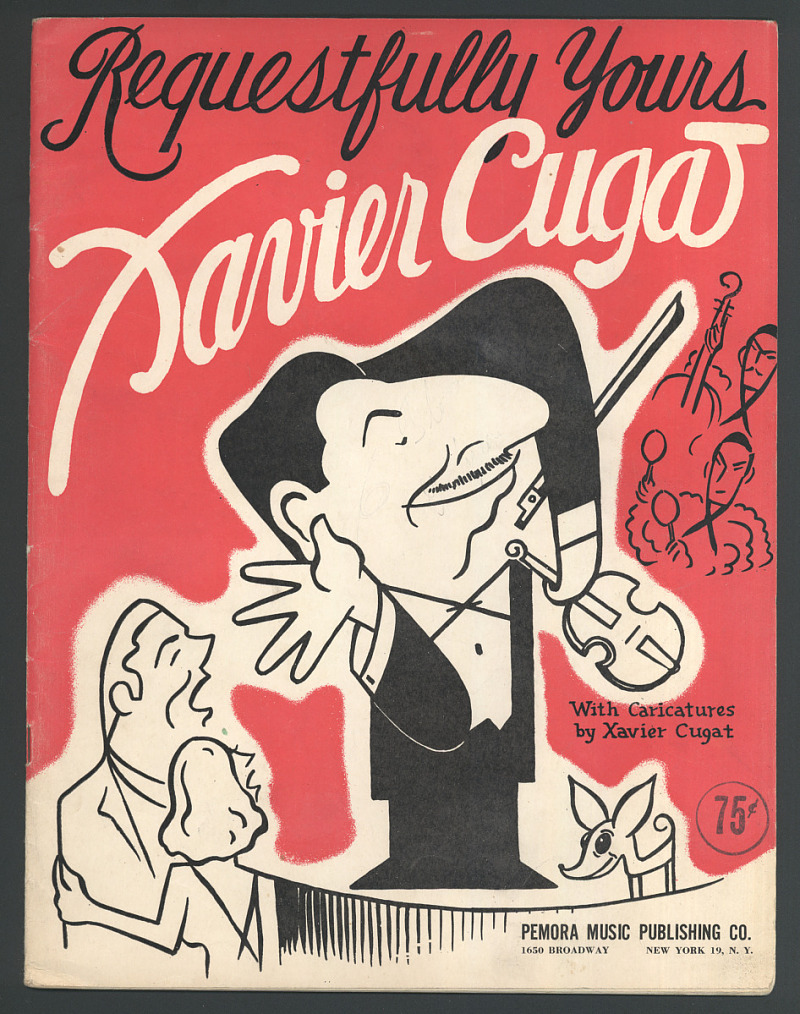
Cover of a 1950 sheet music book for Xavier Cugat hits, "Requestfully Yours". Cugat often drew caricatures to illustrate his music. Note the ever present chihuahua.

== Discography ==
- The Lady in Red (RCA Victor, 1935)
- One, Two, Three, Kick – Congas (Victor, 1941)
- Xavier Cugat's Mexico (Columbia, 1944)
- Cugat's Favorite Rhumbas (Columbia, 1945, No. 3 US)
- In Santiago, Chile (Tain't Chilly At All) (Columbia, 1948)
- Siesta (Columbia, 1948)
- Tropical Bouquets (Columbia, 1949)
- Relaxing with Cugat (Columbia, 1952)
- Dancetime with Cugat (RCA Victor, 1953)
- Cugat's Favorite Rhumbas (Columbia, 1954)
- Ole! (Columbia, 1955)
- Mambo at the Waldorf (Columbia, 1955)
- Cha Cha Cha (Columbia, 1955)
- Cugatango! (10" record) (Columbia, 1956)
- Bread, Love and Cha Cha Cha (Columbia, 1957)
- Waltzes but by Cugat! (Columbia, 1957)
- Mambo! (Music for Latin Lovers) (Mercury, 1957)
- The King Plays Some Aces (RCA Victor, 1958)
- Cugat Calvalcade (Columbia, 1958)
- Cugat in Spain (RCA Victor, 1959)
- That Latin Beat! (RCA Victor, 1959)
- Chile Con Cugie (RCA Victor, 1959)
- The Latin Rhythms of Xavier Cugat (Harmony, 1960)
- Cugat in France, Spain, and Italy (RCA Victor, 1960)
- The Best of Cugat (Mercury, 1961)
- Viva Cugat! (Mercury, 1961)
- Twist with Cugat (Mercury, 1962)
- Cugat Plays Continental Hits (Mercury, 1962)
- Most Popular Movie Hits As Styled By Cugat (Mercury, 1962)
- Cugat Plays Continental Hits (Mercury, 1962)
- Cugi's Cocktails (Mercury, 1963)
- Cugat's Golden Goodies (Mercury, 1963)
- Cugi's Cocktails (Mercury, 1963)
- Cugat Caricatures (Mercury, 1964)
- Plays the Music of Ernesto Lecuona (Mercury, 1964)
- Midnight Roses (Decca, 1968)
- The Cugat Touch (Springboard, 1976)
