= Easy to Wed =

1946 American musical film

- theatrical release poster
- Directed by: Edward Buzzell; Buster Keaton (uncredited); Edward Sedgwick (uncredited)
- Written by: Dorothy Kingsley (adaptation); Buster Keaton (uncredited)
- Based on: Libeled Lady; 1936 film by Jack Conway
- Produced by: Jack Cummings
- Starring: Van Johnson; Esther Williams; Lucille Ball; Keenan Wynn
- Cinematography: Harry Stradling Sr.
- Edited by: Blanche Sewell
- Music by: Johnny Green
- Production company: Metro-Goldwyn-Mayer
- Distributed by: Loew's Inc.
- Release date: July 11, 1946 (U.S.)
- Running time: 106 minutes
- Country: United States
- Language: English
- Budget: $1,683,000
- Box office: $5,638,000

Easy to Wed is a 1946 Technicolor American musical comedy film directed by Edward Buzzell, and starring Van Johnson, Esther Williams, Lucille Ball, and Keenan Wynn. The screenplay by Dorothy Kingsley is an adaptation of the screenplay of the 1936 film Libeled Lady by Maurine Dallas Watkins, Howard Emmett Rogers, and George Oppenheimer.

== Plot ==
Financier J. B. Allenbury is determined to file a $2 million libel suit against The Morning Star when the newspaper prints a story claiming his daughter Connie was responsible for the breakup of a marriage. Anxious to save his paper from financial ruin (Allenbury's real goal), editor Curtis Farwood turns to business manager Warren Haggerty, who postpones his marriage to Gladys Benton in order to assist his employer.

Warren's convoluted scheme involves having reporter Bill Chandler temporarily marry Gladys so that she can sue Connie for alienation of affection when an intimate photograph of Bill and Connie Allenbury surfaces, "proving" that the newspaper story is not libelous. In order to get the damaging picture, Bill must ingratiate himself with the Allenburys, who are vacationing at the Hotel Del Rey in Mexico. He heads south of the border with Spike Dolan and introduces himself to the Allenburys as a writer who enjoys hunting, which is J. B.'s favorite hobby.

As time passes and Bill fails to get himself photographed with Connie, Gladys and Warren become increasingly impatient. Warren suspects Bill has become romantically involved with Connie and flies to Mexico in the hope he can persuade her and her father to drop their lawsuit. When they turn him down, Warren telephones Gladys, who arrives at the resort and tells J. B. she is married to Bill. When J. B. reports this news to his daughter, Connie decides to prove him wrong by demanding that Bill marry her immediately. They are wed by a justice of the peace.

When Warren and Gladys threaten to expose Bill as a bigamist, Bill announces that Gladys' mail-order divorce from her previous husband is not legally binding and therefore her marriage to Bill is invalid. Gladys then reveals that she obtained a second divorce in Reno that is legal. The Allenburys finally agree to drop their lawsuit, and Warren and Gladys realize they are meant to be together.

== Cast ==
- Van Johnson as Bill Stevens Chandler
- Esther Williams as Connie Allenbury
- Lucille Ball as Gladys Benton
- Keenan Wynn as Warren Haggerty
- Cecil Kellaway as J. B. Allenbury
- Carlos Ramírez as Himself
- Ben Blue as Spike Dolan
- Ethel Smith as Herself
- June Lockhart as Babs Norvell
- Grant Mitchell as Homer Henshaw
- Josephine Whittell as Mrs. Burns Norvell
- Paul Harvey as Farwood
- Jonathan Hale as Hector Boswell
- James Flavin as Joe
- Celia Travers as Farwood's Secretary
- Sybil Merritt as Receptionist
- Sondra Rodgers as Attendant

== Production ==
As noted in the opening credits, this film was adapted from the screenplay of the 1936 film Libeled Lady, a non-musical comedy starring Jean Harlow as Gladys Benton, William Powell as Bill Chandler, Myrna Loy as Connie Allenbury, and Spencer Tracy as Warren Haggerty.

In July 1944, MGM announced they would remake Libleled Lady, with Jack Cummings to produce. In November Van Johnson and Lucille Ball were announced as stars. Later that month the film was retitled Early to Wed and Esther Williams and Keenan Wynn joined the film.

In March 1945, filming was halted when Wynn was in a motorbike accident.

This was the first film in which Williams sang, and she had to work with Harriet Lee, the MGM voice coach. However, Williams's singing part was actually in Portuguese, making it all the more difficult for her. The studio then hired Carmen Miranda to coach both Williams and Johnson.

This was Johnson and Williams's second film together, after Thrill of a Romance, which had been extremely successful at the box office. Williams said the two had been cast because "Van and I matched. It looked like we belonged together as a couple. He was as much the all-American boy as I was the all-American girl. As World War II drew to a close, we...became icons, in a way, symbolizing the virtues that people loved best about America. Van represented all the young men who had gone off to war for their country, and I represented the girls they were fighting to come home to."

Van Johnson's biography, MGM's Golden Boy, states that Lucille Ball's performance as Gladys "reveals the embryo of her Lucy Ricardo role in the later I Love Lucy television series", and also states that Keenan Wynn had been in a motorcycle accident before filming, had his mouth wired shut, and as a result, he had to talk between his teeth while losing thirty pounds in four weeks.

The film also features organist Ethel Smith in a musical sequence with Johnson and Williams, her second appearance in an Esther Williams film, the first being Bathing Beauty (1944).

The duck hunting sequence with Johnson was written and directed by Buster Keaton and Edward Sedgwick.

Ball and Wynn had previously teamed in Without Love. Ball broke a toe doing a dance number during filming.

In December 1944, the title was changed to Marry Me, Darling. Cecil Kellaway joined the film in January 1945, replacing Frank Morgan.

== Box office ==
The film was a hit: according to MGM records, it earned $4,028,000 in the US and Canada and $1,610,000 elsewhere, making the studio a profit of $1,779,000.

== Musical numbers ==
1. "The Continental Polka" – Sung and Danced by Lucille Ball (dubbed by Virginia Rees) and Chorus.
2. "Acercate Mas" – Sung by Carlos Ramírez.
3. "Acercate Mas" (reprise) – Sung and Danced by Esther Williams with Van Johnson.
4. "Toca Tu Samba" – Played on the organ by Ethel Smith.
5. "Boneca de Pixe" – Played on the organ by Ethel Smith and sung and danced by Esther Williams, Van Johnson and Chorus.

== Critical reception ==
Bosley Crowther of The New York Times observed, "Perhaps the best things about it are Keenan Wynn and Lucille Ball . . . for both of these pleasant young people have exceptionally keen comedy sense and their roles are the most productive of hilarity in the show . . . Together they handle the burdens of the cleverly-complicated plot and throw both their voices and their torsos into an almost continuous flow of gags . . . Eddie Buzzell's direction, which never has been memorable, looks very good in this instance . . . Easy to Wed [is] a summer picture that is decidedly easy to enjoy."

Variety called the film "top-notch entertainment" and added, "Eddie Buzzell's direction emphasizes lightness and speed, despite picture's long footage . . . Lucille Ball is a standout on the comedy end, particularly her sequence where she indulges in an inebriated flight into fantastic Shakespeare. Keenan Wynn's deft comedy work also presses hard for solid laughs."

Film critic Pauline Kael said of the film that it was a result of feats of production presumed to be possible nowhere else.

== Home media ==
On July 17, 2007, Warner Home Video released the film as part of the box set TCM Spotlight – Esther Williams, Vol. 1. Bonus features include the Academy Award-nominated Pete Smith Specialty comedy short Sure Cures, the animated short The Unwelcome Guest, and the film's theatrical trailer.
