= On an Island with You =

1948 film by Richard Thorpe

- Theatrical release poster
- Directed by: Richard Thorpe
- Screenplay by: Charles Martin; Hans Wilhelm; Dorothy Kingsley; Dorothy Cooper
- Story by: Charles Martin; Hans Wilhelm
- Produced by: Joe Pasternak
- Starring: Esther Williams; Peter Lawford; Ricardo Montalbán; Cyd Charisse; Jimmy Durante
- Cinematography: Charles Rosher
- Edited by: Douglass Biggs; Ferris Webster
- Music by: Albert Sendrey; George Stoll
- Production company: Metro-Goldwyn-Mayer
- Distributed by: Loew's Inc.
- Release date: May 3, 1948
- Running time: 107 minutes
- Country: United States
- Language: English
- Budget: $2,527,000
- Box office: $5,282,000

On an Island with You is a 1948 American musical Technicolor romantic comedy film directed by Richard Thorpe. It stars Esther Williams, Peter Lawford, Ricardo Montalbán, Cyd Charisse, Kathryn Beaumont and Jimmy Durante. (Note: Van Johnson had originally been announced as the lead before Lawford was assigned to the film.)

== Plot ==
Rosalind Reynolds, a swimming sensation, is starring in a film set on a Hawaiian tropical island along with her fiancé, Ricardo Montez. A military technical adviser for the film, U.S. Navy Lt. Lawrence Y. Kingslee falls in love with Rosalind. Yvonne Torro, her best friend and fellow movie star, secretly wants Ricardo for herself.

Larry, who had met Rosalind three years before on a USO show at his Pacific base, makes it obvious that he is smitten with her. After kissing her on the set, showing up Ricardo, he plans to spirit her away on his aircraft. Later, at the Royal Aloha hotel, the film cast and crew are entertained by real-life orchestra leader Xavier Cugat and his orchestra. The next day, taking advantage of a scene where Rosalind flies over the set, Larry flies to the actual island where he first met her. After asking for a kiss, he knows that Rosalind is attracted to him. Returning to their aircraft, the two discover that the natives have stolen parts, effectively stranding them on the island.

Meanwhile, her fiancé and the search party he formed are captured by the cannibals who inhabit the tropical isle, but are saved by his rival. After everyone leaves the island, complications begin. With Larry facing a court-martial, Rosalind tries to help him by accepting blame for the unauthorized flight to the island. Eventually, they learn that Yvonne has become romantically involved with Ricardo, while Larry and Rosalind also realize they are in love.

== Cast ==
As appearing in On an Island with You, (main roles and screen credits identified):

- Esther Williams as Rosalind Reynolds
- Peter Lawford as Lt. Lawrence Y. Kingslee
- Ricardo Montalbán as Ricardo Montez (singing voice dubbed by Bill Lee)
- Jimmy Durante as Jimmy Buckley
- Cyd Charisse as Yvonne Torro
- Leon Ames as Commander Harrison
- Kathryn Beaumont as Penelope Peabody aka Pineapple
- Dick Simmons as George Blaine
- Xavier Cugat as himself
- Betty Reilly as herself

== Songs ==
Music by Nacio Herb Brown, lyrics by Edward Heyman, except where noted:

- "On an Island With You"
- "The Dog Song"
- "I Know Darn Well I Can Do Without Broadway" (music and lyrics by Jimmy Durante)
- "Takin' Miss Mary to the Ball"
- "I'll Do the Strut-Away (in my Cutaway)" (music and lyrics by Durante, Harry Donnelly, Irving Caesar)
- "You Gotta Start Off Each Day With a Song" (Durante)

== Production ==
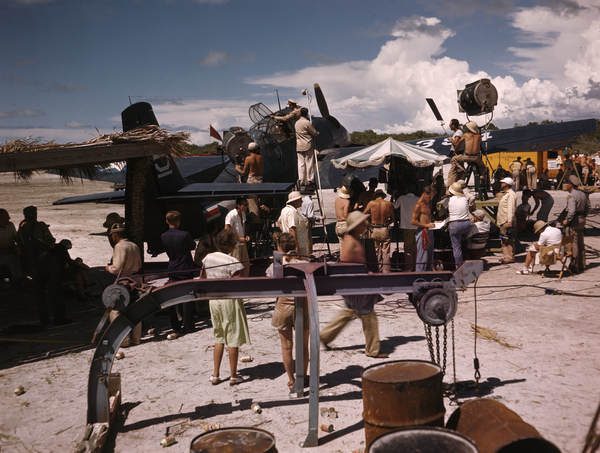
Filming of "On an Island with You," at Anna Maria Island.

Principal photography took place on MGM lots and on location around Anna Maria Island, Florida from June 1 to early September 1947. Williams disliked her director, and blamed him for an accident on set. During a scene she was supposed to walk along the jungle floor and fall into a hole camouflaged by vegetation, but there was no cushioning at the bottom to break her fall, and she did fall straight down to a hard landing, causing a sprained ankle. Williams thereafter, with the sprained ankle, had to finish the film on crutches.

A similar fate befell Cyd Charisse who had completed the bulk of her work, including two dance duets with Ricardo Montalban, then tore ligaments in her knee during filming of the big ceremonial dance on the island. She ended up in a cast for two months and a substitute dancer finished her dance scenes, photographed from long distance.

The aircraft that were used in the film included a U.S. Navy Grumman TBF Avenger torpedo bomber that played a pivotal role in the plot, and a Grumman JRF-5 Goose flying boat.

== Reception ==
Like all of Esther Williams' other films, On an Island with You was a moneymaker and did well at the box office as one of the most popular films of 1948. It earned $3,191,000 in the US and Canada and $2,091,000 overseas resulting in a profit to MGM of $816,000.

Critics, however, recognized both the merits and shortcomings of the Williams format. The review in The New York Times indicated, "The shortcomings of 'On An Island' merit no serious invective, but to make the record complete, it should be observed that Richard Thorpe, the director, never helped the film to rise above its basic material."

== Radio adaptation ==
On an Island with You was presented on Musical Comedy Theater March 19, 1952. The one-hour adaptation starred Edward Everett Horton, Polly Bergen, and Earl Wrightson.
