= Thrill of a Romance =

1945 film by Richard Thorpe

- Theatrical release poster
- Directed by: Richard Thorpe
- Written by: Richard Connell; Gladys Lehman
- Produced by: Joe Pasternak
- Starring: Van Johnson; Esther Williams; Frances Gifford; Carleton G. Young; Lauritz Melchior
- Cinematography: Harry Stradling
- Edited by: George Boemler
- Music by: Calvin Jackson; George Stoll
- Distributed by: Metro-Goldwyn-Mayer
- Release date: May 24, 1945
- Running time: 105 minutes
- Country: United States
- Language: English
- Budget: $1,410,000
- Box office: $7,205,000

Thrill of a Romance (also known as Thrill of a New Romance) is an American Technicolor romance film released by Metro-Goldwyn-Mayer in 1945, starring Van Johnson, Esther Williams and Carleton G. Young, with musical performances by Tommy Dorsey & his Orchestra and opera singer Lauritz Melchior. The film was directed by Richard Thorpe and written by Richard Connell and Gladys Lehman.

The film tells the story of Cynthia Glenn, who, after a whirlwind romance, marries a rich businessman. However, on the first day of their honeymoon, her new husband is called away to Washington, leaving her alone at a resort. During this time, she meets and falls in love with a war hero, Tommy Milvaine, played by Van Johnson.

This was the first of four films that co-starred Williams and Johnson. Made over a period of eight years, those that followed were Easy to Wed (1946), Duchess of Idaho (1950) and Easy to Love (1953).

Thrill of a Romance was a box office success, becoming the seventh-highest-grossing film of 1945.

== Plot ==
Cynthia Glenn (Esther Williams) is a swimming instructor in Los Angeles, where she lives with her scatterbrained aunt and uncle Nona and Hobart (Spring Byington and Henry Travers). While demonstrating a dive, she catches the eye of an interested stranger, Bob Delbar (Carleton G. Young). Cynthia receives flowers from the stranger. The two court for one month, then get married.

On their honeymoon at the hotel Monte Belva, they encounter the famous opera singer, Nils Knudsen (Lauritz Melchior). Major Thomas Milvaine (Van Johnson), also staying at the hotel, notices Cynthia. A rich colleague, J. P. Bancroft, insists that Bob come to Washington, D.C. to complete a deal. While Cynthia cries over Bob's departure, Tommy, staying next door, comforts her.

Next day by the pool, she and Bancroft's daughter, Maude (Frances Gifford) speculate as to which hotel guest is Major Thomas Milvaine, the decorated war hero, who shot down "16... or was it 26 war planes?" and was stuck on a deserted island for a month. After Maude teases Cynthia about being at the hotel without her husband, Cynthia performs an elaborate dive and runs into Major Milvaine himself, who can't actually swim, so she teaches him how.

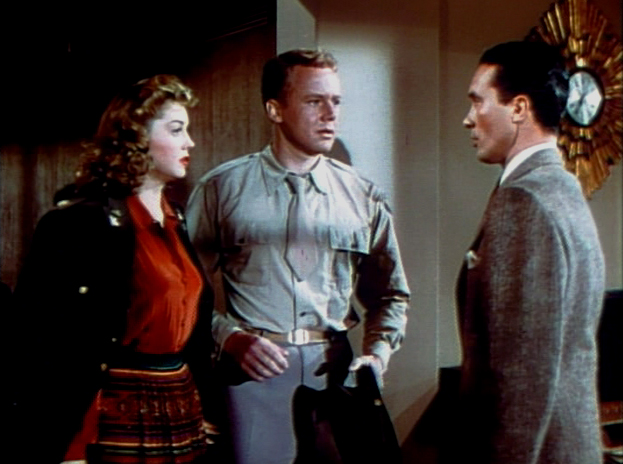
Bob (Carleton G. Young) returns to his honeymoon to see his wife Esther Williams with another man Van Johnson

For the rest of the week, Cynthia and Tommy continue accompanying each other to dinner and other activities around the hotel, including swimming. On the last day, Cynthia receives a telegram from Bob informing her that he can't return for another week. Tommy is leaving the next morning, and Cynthia is distraught, so she retires to her room. Tommy realizes he loves her, rushes to their adjoining balcony, confesses his love and that he will stay for another week. Cynthia reiterates that she's a married woman, and therefore won't let him hop over the hedge separating their two balconies and make love to her. She calls Bob and begs him to return, but he can't.

Cynthia looks for Tommy the next morning, but is told that he has checked out. She goes for a walk on the Sunset Trail. Tommy sets off after her on the trail. Bob telephones the hotel and leaves a message that he will arrive the following morning. Tommy and Cynthia spot a tree with initials engraved on it. Cynthia tells Tommy that she loves him but wants to give her marriage a chance, so they should never see each other again. However, they lose their way and are forced to spend the night in the woods.

The next morning, Bob can't find his wife in the hotel. When they do return, Tommy tries to explain their disappearance, while Bob realizes that the two are in love. He becomes angry with Cynthia, and announces he wants an annulment. Bob calls his lawyer, learning he was never actually divorced from his previous wife. Tommy leaves to become an instructor at Darwin Field, and Cynthia returns home to her aunt and uncle.

Nils Knudsen telephones Tommy, and they go to Cynthia's house late at night, where they and the band from the hotel serenade her. Tommy lip-synches Knudsen's voice to a love song to Cynthia. She runs outside to Tommy and they share a kiss, while Knudsen continues singing. Nona and a bemused Hobart wonder how Tommy can sing and kiss at the same time.

== Cast ==
- Esther Williams as Cynthia Glenn
- Van Johnson as Major Thomas Milvaine
- Carleton G. Young as Robert G. Delbar
- Frances Gifford as Maude Bancroft
- Henry Travers as Hobart 'Hobie' Glenn
- Spring Byington as Nona Glenn
- Lauritz Melchior as Nils Knudsen
- Jane Isbell as Giggling Girl
- Ethel Griffies as Mrs. Sarah Fenway
- Donald Curtis as K.O. Karny
- Jerry Scott as Lyonel
- Fernando Alvarado as Julio
- Helene Stanley as Susan Dorsey
- Vince Barnett as Oscar the waiter
- Billy House as Dr. Tove
- Joan Fay Macaboy as Betty
- Tommy Dorsey as himself (as Tommy Dorsey and His Orchestra)
- Jeff Chandler as Singer
- The King Sisters as Specialty Act

Drummer Buddy Rich (uncredited, except for the “BR” logo on his bass drum) notably performs a short solo in one scene, as well as playing with the Dorsey Orchestra in several others.

Sixteen-year-old Jerry Scott sings a beautiful rendition of “Because (You Come to Me with Naught Save Love)”.

== Production ==
It was Esther Williams' first film following her debut as a star in Bathing Beauty. MGM described the film as "primarily a human comedy with musical trimmings". Johnson's casting was announced in March 1944. Robert Z. Leonard was meant to direct but he fell ill so Richard Thorpe took over.

When attempting to create the right shade of blue for the swimming pool, the set decorator discovered that the paint he had used to color the cement had dissolved after adding the chlorine to the pool, creating a mess with the consistency of homogenized milk. The pool had to be drained and refilled.

In her autobiography, Williams said that the studio attempted to put her and costar Van Johnson together in public as much as possible, even though she was involved with future husband Ben Gage. When asked why they didn't date, Johnson replied "because I'm afraid she can't get her webbed feet into a pair of evening sandals."

While filming, Williams and Thorpe rarely got along. After Williams forgot several lines during one take and the cast and crew began to leave for lunch, Williams notified Thorpe of her mistake. He called the entire crew back to the stage, saying "Turn the lights back on, boys. This lady wants to act." Williams locked herself in her dressing room for the rest of the day. After that episode, Thorpe stopped picking on her.

When filming the backstroke scenes in the swimming pool, Williams had to place her hand under Johnson's back to keep him afloat.

The Office of War Information voiced concern that the film, set in an elegant resort, would pose problems with overseas distribution. A memo from the agency claimed that films boasting of American opulence would be resented by the allies closer to the fighting front.

== Release ==
The film wrapped on October 1, 1944, and was released the following year. It was previewed in a small neighborhood outside of Los Angeles. Cards filled out by the audience were filled with comments such as "Van is a darling" and "I love that boy...I love him more than Frankie."

The film premiered at the Grauman's Egyptian Theatre in Hollywood, with the proceeds going to the war wounded. Johnson was overcome by female fans upon his arrival and exit to the theater. Fans stole his handkerchief, boutonnière and buttons from his shirt. They also yanked his tie, tore his collar and ripped his red hair from his head, leaving his scalp bleeding.

=== Critical response ===
Bosley Crowther's review in The New York Times claimed that "the minutes drag on here unthrillingly" and that "as for Miss Williams, she models a bathing suit handsomely and cuts a fine figure in the water. But right there her talent ends."

A reviewer for the Los Angeles Times wrote, "Thrill of a Romance is all bright colors but the luster is only glaze deep. But its gaudiness will carry it through, especially with the fans."

When the film opened at the Capitol Theater in Manhattan, the critic from the New York Herald Tribune remarked that Johnson gave "the type of performance that has endeared him to the younger set. He is the antithesis of the 'wolf'...clean cut, amiable, a little shy, and needing aid and comfort."

=== Box office ===
Thrill of a Romance was the seventh top-grossing film of 1945 in the US and Canada, earning $4,338,000. It also earned $2,682,000 in other countries, resulting in a profit of $3,259,000.

=== Home media ===
On October 6, 2009, Turner Entertainment released Thrill of a Romance on DVD as part of the Esther Williams Spotlight Collection, Volume 2. The 6 disc set was a follow-up to the company's Esther Williams Spotlight Collection, Volume 1, and contains digitally remastered versions of several of Williams's films including Fiesta (1947), This Time for Keeps (1947), Pagan Love Song (1950), Million Dollar Mermaid (1952) and Easy to Love (1953).
