= Fiesta (1947 film) =

1947 film by Richard Thorpe

- French theatrical release poster
- Directed by: Richard Thorpe
- Written by: George Bruce; Lester Cole
- Produced by: Jack Cummings
- Starring: Esther Williams; Ricardo Montalbán; Mary Astor; Fortunio Bonanova; Cyd Charisse; John Carroll
- Cinematography: Wilfrid M. Cline; Charles Rosher; Sidney Wagner
- Edited by: Blanche Sewell
- Music by: Johnny Green
- Production company: Metro-Goldwyn-Mayer
- Distributed by: Loew's, Inc.
- Release date: June 12, 1947
- Running time: 104 minutes
- Country: United States
- Language: English
- Budget: $2,395,000
- Box office: $5,635,000

Fiesta is a 1947 American Technicolor musical drama film directed by Richard Thorpe and starring Esther Williams, Ricardo Montalbán, Mary Astor and Cyd Charisse. It was released by Metro-Goldwyn-Mayer. The screenplay was written by George Bruce and Lester Cole.

The story focuses on Mario Morales (Montalbán), a bullfighter who wants to be a composer, and his twin sister, Maria Morales (Williams), who wants to be a bullfighter even though she is a woman.

The film was shot on location in Puebla, Mexico. This was Montalbán's first credited role in a Hollywood film, and resulted in him being offered a contract by the studio. It was also the first of three films pairing Williams and Montalbán, the other two being On an Island with You (1948) and Neptune's Daughter (1949).

Fiesta was the first time Williams's name was billed above the title in the marketing, though in the onscreen credits, all the actors are below the title.

== Plot summary ==
Retired matador Antonio Morales is anxious when his wife gives birth, disappointed when the baby turns out to be a girl, then thrilled when a twin brother is born. He names them Mario and Maria.

As the children grow up, Antonio's wife dreads the idea of her son facing the danger of becoming a bullfighter, particularly inasmuch as Mario has an artistic side to his nature, an affinity for music. Maria, meanwhile, becomes quite expert in the ring, taught by her father's right-hand man, Chato Vasquez.

As a gift on their 21st birthday, Maria honors her brother by getting a copy of Mario's new music composition to Maximino Contreras, a famed orchestra conductor. Maximino, thoroughly impressed, pays a call on the Morales family just before Mario's first bullfight. Antonio prefers not to distract his son prior to entering the ring, so he promises to pass along Maximino's personal regards later. But he does not.

Before a second bullfight, Mario is approached by Maximino, who wonders why he never responded to his previous invitation to meet. Realizing that his father ignored it, Mario angrily walks out of the ring, disappointing spectators and infuriating his father, who feels the family's honor has been disgraced.

Mario subsequently disappears. Maximino has his composition played on the radio in hopes it will draw him out of hiding, while Maria, with the same goal and to save his reputation, disguises herself as Mario and continues on the bullfighting circuit in his place. He eventually returns, but when Maria sees him in the audience she is distracted and almost killed; Mario intervenes to save her life. The incident leads their father to support Mario's pursuit of a life in music instead of bullfighting.

== Cast ==
- Esther Williams as Maria Morales
- Ricardo Montalbán as Mario Morales
- Fortunio Bonanova as Antonio Morales
- Mary Astor as Señora Morales
- Akim Tamiroff as Chato Vasquez
- John Carroll as Jose 'Pepe' Ortega
- Cyd Charisse as Conchita
- Hugo Haas as Maximino Contreras
- Jean Van as Maria Morales, as a child
- Joey Preston as Mario Morales, as a child
- Frank Puglia as Doctor
- Los Bocheros as The Basque Singers
- Alan Napier as The Tourist

== Soundtrack ==
- Fantasia Mexicana
  - based on El Salon Mexico
  - Music by Aaron Copland
  - Music Adapted and Orchestrated by Johnny Green
  - Piano soloist André Previn
- La Bamba
  - Written by Luis Martínez Serrano
- Jarabe Tapatío (The Mexican Hat Dance)
  - Traditional
- La luna enamorada
  - Written by Angel Ortiz De Villajos, Miriano Bolanos, Recio Leocadio and Martinez Durango
- Romeria Vasca
  - Written and Performed by Los Bocheros
- La barca de oro
  - Traditional

== Production ==
In March 1945, producer Jack Cummings announced his next film would be Fiesta Brava ("Wonderful Holiday") with Esther Williams. It was based on a story that George Bruce had come up with after a two-month holiday in Mexico.

In September 1945, MGM announced Richard Thorpe would direct with filming to start in October. The same month Ricardo Montalban, married to Loretta Young's sister, was announced as Williams' co star.

The film took longer than expected because Thorpe decided that he did not want the bulls killed. However, this led to the bulls attacking the stuntmen, four of them ending up in the hospital, and two of them barely surviving after being gored in the groin due to infections caused by the dirt on the bulls' horns. (Williams was doubled by men. After years swimming, she had broad shoulders, a flat backside, and a different body build from that of a bullfighter and a visible difference on film.) Not killing the bulls made the Mexican people angry, which didn't help, since they were already angry that their own toreadors could not star in the film. At the end of filming, the unit manager, Walter Strohm convinced Thorpe to kill the bulls, even though they cost $1000 each.

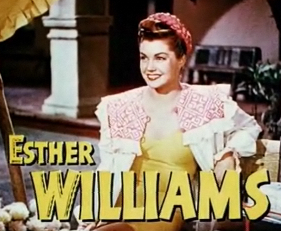
Esther Williams as Maria Morales

Director of photography Sidney Wagner and one other crew member died of cholera after eating contaminated street food they had bought in town. Williams' husband, Ben Gage, was arrested after getting into a fight with an employee of the hotel at which the cast was staying, the same man who had recently shot the crew's doctor, who had yelled at him. Gage's arrest was covered by gossip columnist Hedda Hopper. Gage and the film's makeup artist George Lane were then declared persona non grata and wanted expelled from Mexico, but the company would be allowed to finish shooting the film. However, Williams knew that Lane would be fired when he returned to California, so she stalled shooting until he came back. Instead, the studio sent another makeup artist, Bill Tuttle to Mexico, and he promised Williams he would help Lane get another job. In the film's bullring sequence, the capework concludes with the archaic and very rare "quite de la mariposa," or "butterfly takeaway." Hemingway described this maneuver as he saw it performed in the 1920s and '30s by matador Marcial Lananda. In 1983 Lalanda, now an octogenarian, described it in an interview on Television Española, as performed by matador Luis Francisco Espla.

The studio insisted that Williams wear a traje de luces matador outfit for the film. Traditionally, the suit is made to lie very flat on the toreador's chest, and this proved to be difficult. The tailor in Mexico refused to work on the suit unless Williams "agreed to have her bosom surgically removed." Strohm had the suit sent back to Irene, MGM's costume designer in Hollywood, to be fitted to her body, which included closing the fly with hooks. On the trage de luces, when worn by men, the fly is left slightly open, so the "world can appreciate what's in there."

The film features Williams in the water for one short sequence. This was a stark contrast with many of her box office hits, which all featured elaborate water sequences. Publicity photos for the film featuring Williams in a bathing suit were utilized much more than those of her in the traje de luces suit.

== Reception ==
=== Box Office ===
The film earned $2,546,000 in the US and $3,089,000 elsewhere, resulting in a profit of $1,170,000.

=== Awards ===
Fiesta was nominated for Best Music, Scoring of a Musical Picture at the 1948 Academy Awards, but lost to Mother Wore Tights.

=== Home media ===
On October 6, 2009, Turner Entertainment released Fiesta on DVD as part of the Esther Williams Spotlight Collection, Volume 2. The 6 disc set was a follow-up to the company's Esther Williams Spotlight Collection, Volume 1, and contains digitally remastered versions of several of Williams's films including Thrill of a Romance (1945), This Time for Keeps (1947), Pagan Love Song (1950), Million Dollar Mermaid (1952) and Easy to Love (1953).

== See also ==
- 1947 in film
