= This Time for Keeps =

1947 film by Richard Thorpe

- Theatrical release poster
- Directed by: Richard Thorpe
- Screenplay by: Gladys Lehman; Hans Wilhelm (uncredited)
- Story by: Erwin S. Gelsey; Lorraine Fielding
- Produced by: Joe Pasternak
- Starring: Esther Williams; Jimmy Durante; Lauritz Melchior; Johnnie Johnston
- Cinematography: Karl Freund
- Edited by: John D. Dunning
- Production company: Metro-Goldwyn-Mayer
- Distributed by: Loew's, Inc.
- Release date: October 17, 1947
- Running time: 105 minutes
- Country: United States
- Language: English
- Budget: $2,648,000
- Box office: $4,406,000

This Time for Keeps is a 1947 American romantic musical film directed by Richard Thorpe and starring Esther Williams, Jimmy Durante, Johnnie Johnston and opera singer Lauritz Melchior. Produced by MGM, it is about a soldier, returning home from war, who does not wish to work for his father's opera company or to continue his relationship with his pre-war lover.

The film was shot in color and partly on location at the Grand Hotel, on Mackinac Island in Michigan.

This Time for Keeps became the second film in which Williams's name was first billed above the title, after Fiesta.

== Plot ==
Richard Herald is a famous opera singer and father to Richard Herald II, who has recently returned from fighting in the war and now prefers to be known as Dick Johnson. Dick has been engaged to socialite Frances Allenbury since before he left for the war, but has been expressing some apprehension about marrying her.

Mr. Herald wants his son to join him at the opera company, but Dick wants to enjoy his life now that he's out of the army. Backstage at the theater, he sees a magazine featuring Leonora "Nora" Cambaretti, an aquacade star. Earlier, as it turns out, after Dick received an injury during the war, he stayed at a hospital where Leonora performed for the patients.

Dick had yet to have his bandages removed from his eyes and head, so he couldn't see Nora. Other servicemen described her beauty to him, as her family's friend, Ferdi Farr, played on the piano. Thinking he was blind, Nora allowed Dick to touch her face and then kissed him, only to then find out that he was able to see.

Nora is now performing as the star of the Aqua Capers show. Dick surprises her there, and he reminds her of their previous meeting by giving her a quick kiss, getting his nose twisted as punishment. Nora knows Dick is there to flirt, but she offers him a job with the show, but Ferdi convinces his friend Xavier Cugat to give Dick a position as a baritone at his nightclub.

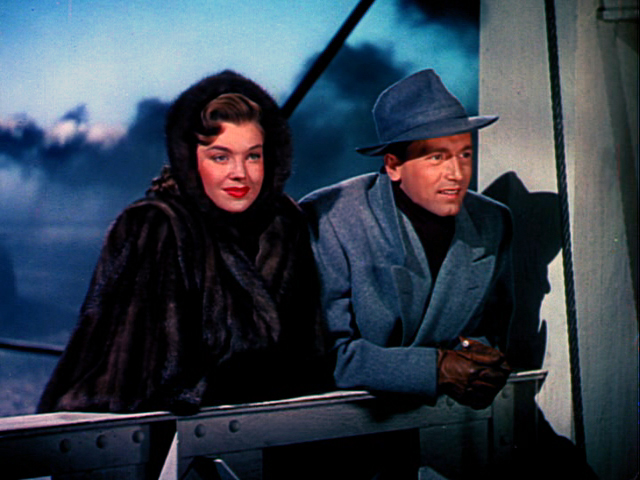
Esther Williams as Leonora 'Nora' Cambaretti and Johnnie Johnston as Dick Johnson

After an Aqua Capers performance, Dick and Nora go to dinner. Ferdi reminds her that she barely knows anything about Dick. At rehearsal the next day, Nora says before she can fall in love, Dick must pass inspection from her family back on Mackinac Island. Dick leaves with Nora while Frances's mother, Harriet, meets with Richard and agrees to announce their children's engagement, unbeknownst to Dick.

On the island, Dick meets Nora's grandmother and niece Deborah, who warm up to him after he sings Grandmother's favorite song, "(I’ll be with You) In Apple Blossom Time". Nora's grandmother grants her approval of Dick for Nora. A bit later, Dick leaves to tell his father about his relationship with Nora and break off the engagement to Frances, which Dick has not told Nora about.

Gordon finds an engagement announcement in the newspaper regarding Dick and Frances and shows it to Ferdi. Ferdi tells Nora about it and she is heartbroken. Gordon arranges for her to stay somewhere Dick can't find her. Six weeks later, Mr. Herald arrives at an Aqua Capers rehearsal in an attempt to find Nora, but Ferdi will not tell him where she is. Ferdi goes to Xavier Cugat's club to see Dick, who accuses Ferdi of being in love with Nora as well.

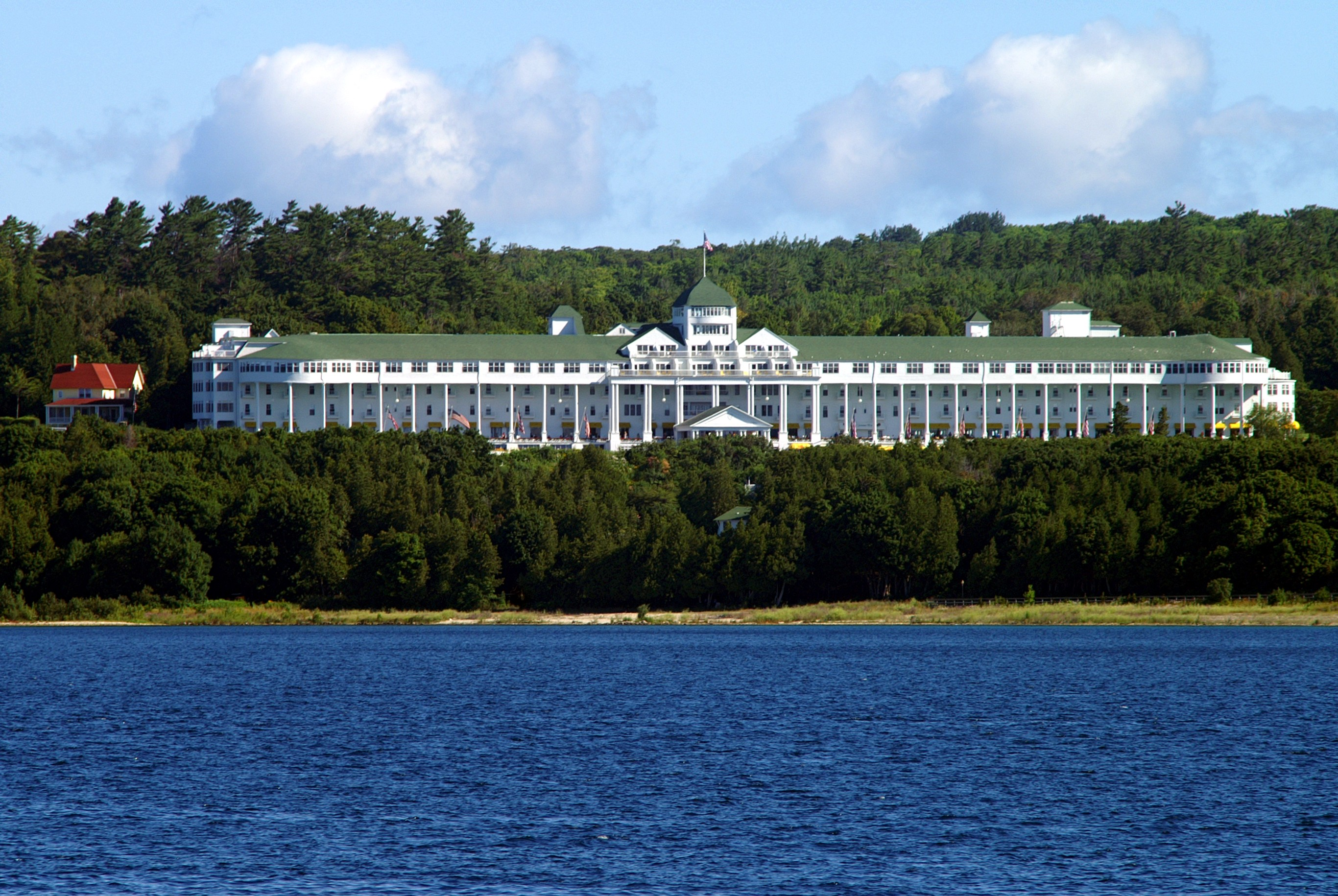
The Grand Hotel, where the film was shot

Meanwhile, summer arrives on Mackinac Island and tourists are flocking there. Cugat's band has a contract to perform at the Grand Hotel, and Dick goes with them. Deborah, knowing that Nora (traveling with Gordon and Ferdi) has arrived by boat, hurries to the hotel and notifies Dick, who loads Deborah onto her bicycle and together they ride to the Cambaretti house to speak with Nora.

This trip, Nora has brought Gordon for her grandmothers' approval. Suddenly, Dick and little Deborah walk in. Dick tries in vain to explain all that has happened. Nora remains confused and upset. She rejects him, so he leaves. Nora and Deborah both start to cry and flee upstairs, where Ferdi overhears them. He invites Mr. Herald to the island, where he apologizes to Grandmother Cambaretti for placing the announcement in the newspaper. He also recognizes her from her old days as a performer in the circus. The two decide that their children should be married and come up with a way to push the two together.

While Nora is at the swimming pool of the hotel, teaching Deborah to dive and swim, Dick begins singing "Easy to Love" with Cugat's female vocalist, which makes Deborah jealous. That night, Nora decides she is going to go after Gordon, but Ferdi convinces her otherwise.

Mr. Herald takes Grandmother to listen to Dick's performance at the hotel, where he convinces Cugat to fire his son and then begins to sing for the audience. He stops singing "La donna è mobile" and begins "Easy to Love", during which Dick gets up and sits next to Nora, where they hold hands and snuggle.

== Cast ==
- Esther Williams as Leonora Cambaretti
- Johnnie Johnston as Dick Johnson
- Jimmy Durante as Ferdi Farro
- Lauritz Melchior as Richard Herald
- Xavier Cugat as himself
- May Whitty as Grandmother Cambaretti
- Mary Stuart as Frances Allenbury
- Ludwig Stössel as Peter
- Sharon McManus as Deborah Cambretti
- Dick Simmons as Gordon

== Music ==
The film's soundtrack contains a mixture of genres, including pop, classical, and Latin music. Melchior performs three operatic arias. Near the end of the film, Cugat's band singer Lina Romay and Cugat perform the "Chiquita Banana" song before they are interrupted by Dick (Johnny Johnston) to sing "You'd Be So Easy to Love" with Romay, who joins in with him, to the bandleader's perplexity. Johnston and Romay later sing a 'blended' "Un poquito de amor" / "I'll give you all my heart" together in the ending nightclub scene.

Other numbers include:

- "Easy to Love" – Johnny Johnston
- "I Love to Dance" (music by Burton Lane, lyrics by Ralph Freed) – Xavier Cugat and His Orchestra
- "I'm the Guy Who Found the Lost Chord" – Jimmy Durante
- "La donna è mobile" from Rigoletto – Lauritz Melchior
- "A Little Bit This and a Little Bit That" – Jimmy Durante
- "Inka Dinka Doo" – Jimmy Durante
- "M'Appari" from Martha – Lauritz Melchior
- "I'll Be with You in Apple Blossom Time" – Johnny Johnston
- "S'No Wonder They Fell in Love" (music by Sammy Fain, lyrics by Ralph Freed) – Johnny Johnston, Esther Williams and Sharon McManus
- "Ora è per sempre addio" from Otello – Lauritz Melchior

== Production ==
The film was announced in January 1946, with Jose Iturbi and Xavier Cugat to star. Van Johnson was originally announced as Esther's co-star. He was eventually replaced by Johnny Johnston, who had just appeared in MGM's Till the Clouds Roll By.

This was the third of four films Williams made with director Richard Thorpe. Williams disliked Thorpe from the start, and the feeling was mutual. "Dick didn't like people who were too cheerful, which meant that he took an instant dislike to me", wrote Williams in her autobiography.

=== Shooting ===
Filming took place in July 1946 and included location shooting on Mackinac Island.

Esther Williams was pregnant during the filming of This Time for Keeps, but later suffered a miscarriage.

To convey the sense of outdoorsy, country small-town life in the film, Irene decided to use a lot of plaid in the costumes. She designed a swimsuit for Williams made out of lumberjack plaid flannel. "It absorbed water like crazy. I dove into the pool and tried to swim, but the suit just dragged me to the bottom. It was like trying to swim while wrapped in an old army blanket. I actually had trouble keeping my head above water" wrote Williams in The Million Dollar Mermaid. "Finally, I reached around me, tugged at the zipper, and watched as the suit quickly sank to the bottom of the deep end of the pool." Williams's assistant had to cut holes in a towel to place around her as she exited the pool, as the set was surrounded by tourists.

Stanley Donen choreographed the dance and water ballet scenes.

Johnston was having a long-term affair with Kathryn Grayson (whom he would later marry) and in her autobiography, Williams wrote that he would read Grayson's intimate letters aloud to the girls in his fan club, including the "all-too-graphic details concerning what she liked about his love-making."

== Reception ==
The film was a hit earning $2,694,000 in the US and Canada and $1,712,000 elsewhere resulting in a profit of $104,000.

=== Critical response ===
A 1947 New York Times review of the film called it a "very dull show, consciously cute and embarrassingly cloying for most of its over-extended length.

=== Home media ===
On October 6, 2009, Turner Entertainment released This Time for Keeps on DVD as part of the Esther Williams Spotlight Collection, Volume 2. The 6 disc set was a follow-up to the company's Esther Williams Spotlight Collection, Volume 1, and contains digitally remastered versions of several of Williams's films including Thrill of a Romance (1945), Fiesta (1947), Pagan Love Song (1950), Million Dollar Mermaid (1952) and Easy to Love (1953).
