= Peter Jerndorff =

Danish stage actor and opera singer (1842-1926)

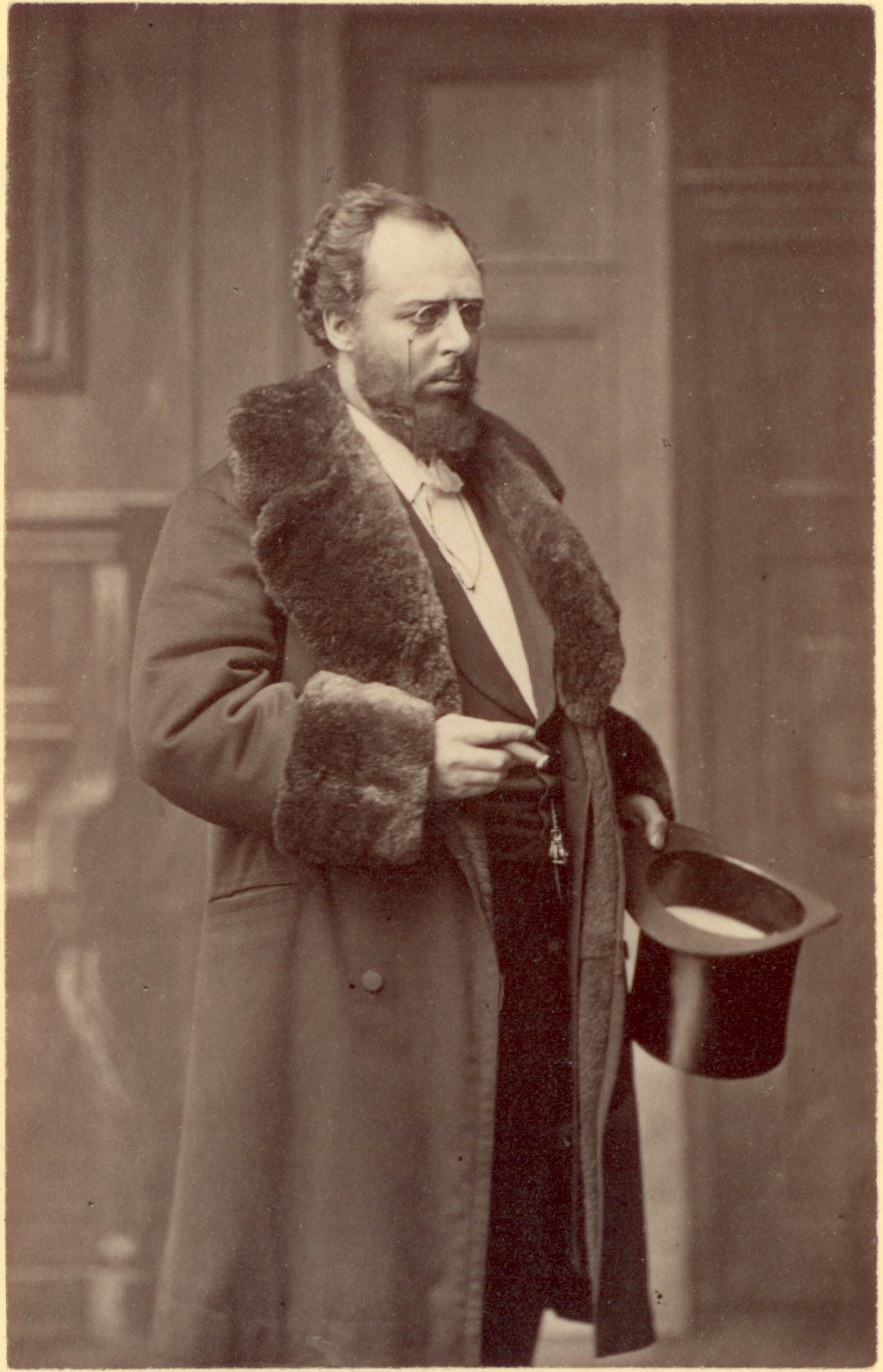
Jerndorff as Dr. Rank in Ibsen's A Doll's House

Peter William Jerndorff (24 November 1842 – 23 December 1926) was a Danish stage actor and opera singer. Amongst the roles he created were Dr. Rank in Ibsen's 1879 play A Doll's House and Leonard in Carl Nielsen's 1906 opera Maskarade. Towards the end of his career he taught diction and acting and appeared in Carl Dreyer's 1922 silent film Der var engang (Once Upon a Time). His students included the Danish opera singers Lauritz Melchior and Vilhelm Herold. Jerndoff died in Copenhagen, the city of his birth, at the age of 84.
