= Carleton G. Young =

American actor (1907–1971)

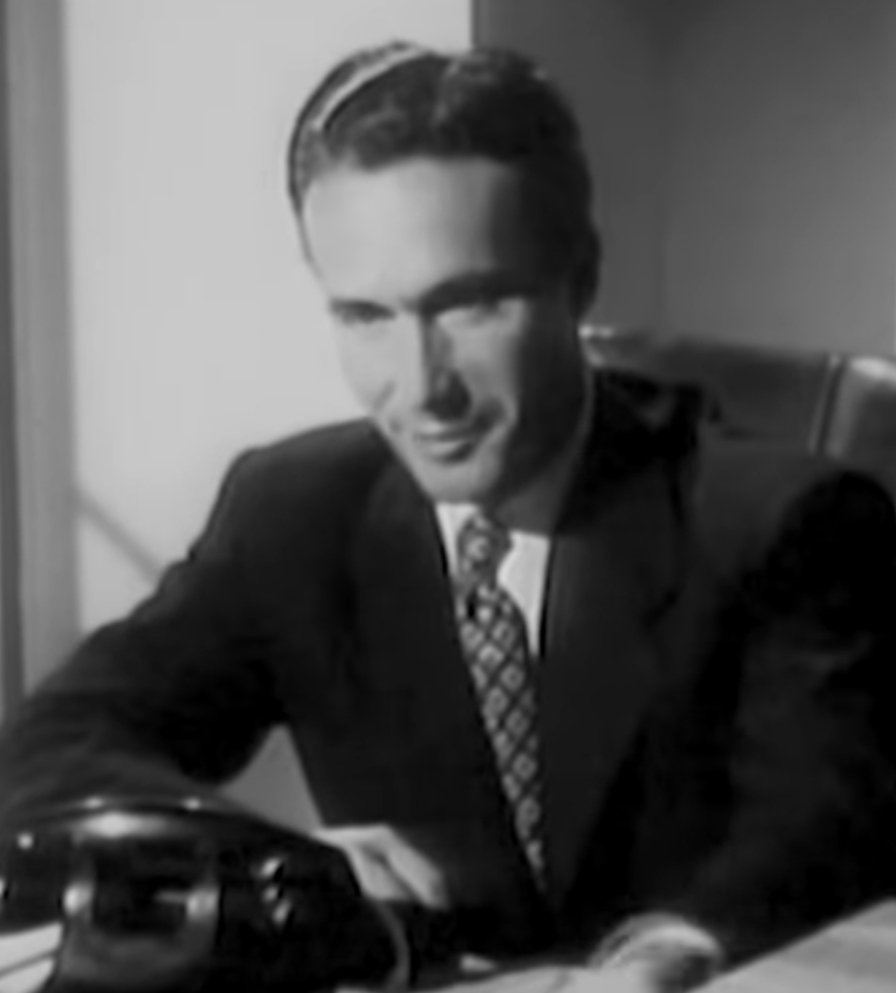
- Young in Smash-Up, the Story of a Woman (1947)
- Born: Carleton Garretson Young; May 28, 1907; New York City, U.S.
- Died: July 11, 1971 (aged 64); Santa Monica, California, U.S.
- Resting place: Inglewood Park Cemetery
- Occupation: Actor
- Years active: 1942–1961
- Spouse: Barbara Young
- Children: Tony Young

Carleton Garretson Young (May 26, 1907 – July 11, 1971) was an American actor in radio, film and television.

== Early years ==
Young was born in Westfield, New York in May 1907. He attended Carnegie Institute of Technology, where he became "one of the most promising of its group of youthful Thespians."

== Radio ==
From January 10, 1942, until August 1943, he had the title role on The Adventures of Ellery Queen, and from 1943 to 1952, he played Edmond Dantès in Mutual's version of The Count of Monte Cristo. In 1951, he played the leading character on the NBC Radio program, The Whisperer. Also guest-starred on numerous episodes of The Railroad Hour throughout its 1948-1954 run. Young's other radio roles include those shown in the table below.

Program	Role
Front Page Farrell	David Farrell
Hollywood Mystery Time	Jim Laughton
Life Begins	Winfield Craig
Portia Faces Life	Kirk Roder
Second Husband	Bill Cummings
Stella Dallas	Dick Grosvenor

== Film ==
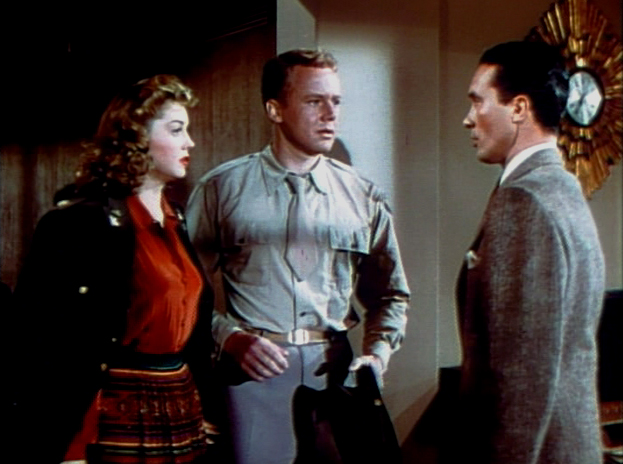
Young with Van Johnson and Esther Williams in Thrill of a Romance (1945).

Young appeared in a number of Hollywood films, including The Kissing Bandit (1948), starring Frank Sinatra, and three 1951 movies, His Kind of Woman (with Robert Mitchum), Hard, Fast and Beautiful (with Claire Trevor) and The Blue Veil (with Jane Wyman).

== Television ==
He worked frequently in TV. In 1959, in the season-two episode of ABC's Leave It to Beaver, Young played John Gates, the father of series character Gilbert Gates (Stephen Talbot). That same year, he was cast, along with Mary Castle, in the episodes "The Big Gamblers" and "The Confidence Gang" of Rex Allen's syndicated western series, Frontier Doctor.

Other television roles were on The Loretta Young Show, Annie Oakley, The Sheriff of Cochise, How to Marry a Millionaire, Perry Mason, M Squad, The Rebel, and Bourbon Street Beat. In 1960, he portrayed the character George McKean in "A Murderer's Return" of the ABC western series, The Life and Legend of Wyatt Earp, starring Hugh O'Brian.

Young's last television roles were in 1961 on the ABC/Warner Brothers drama series, The Roaring 20s and on NBC's Tales of Wells Fargo. That same year, his son, Tony Young, starred in the short-lived CBS western, Gunslinger.

Carleton G. Young is sometimes confused with the film actor Carleton Scott Young.

== Recognition ==
Young has a star at 6733 Hollywood Boulevard in the Radio section of the Hollywood Walk of Fame. It was dedicated February 8, 1960.

== Personal life and death ==
Young was married to Barbara Davis, and they had a son, actor Tony Young. He died on July 11, 1971, at St. John's Hospital in Santa Monica, California. He was interred at Inglewood Park Cemetery, in Inglewood, California.

== Filmography ==
Year	Title	Role	Notes
1944	Ladies of Washington	Federal Investigator	
1945	Thrill of a Romance	Robert G. Delbar	
1945	Abbott and Costello in Hollywood	Gregory LeMaise	
1946	Queen of Burlesque	Steve Hurley	
1947	Smash-Up, the Story of a Woman	Fred Elliott	
1948	The Kissing Bandit	Count Ricardo Belmonte	
1951	Hard, Fast and Beautiful	Fletcher Locke	
1951	His Kind of Woman	Gerald Hobson	
1951	The Blue Veil	Henry Palfrey	
1954	Superman In Exile (Compilation)	Fairchild	
