= Esther Williams =

American swimmer and actress (1921–2013)

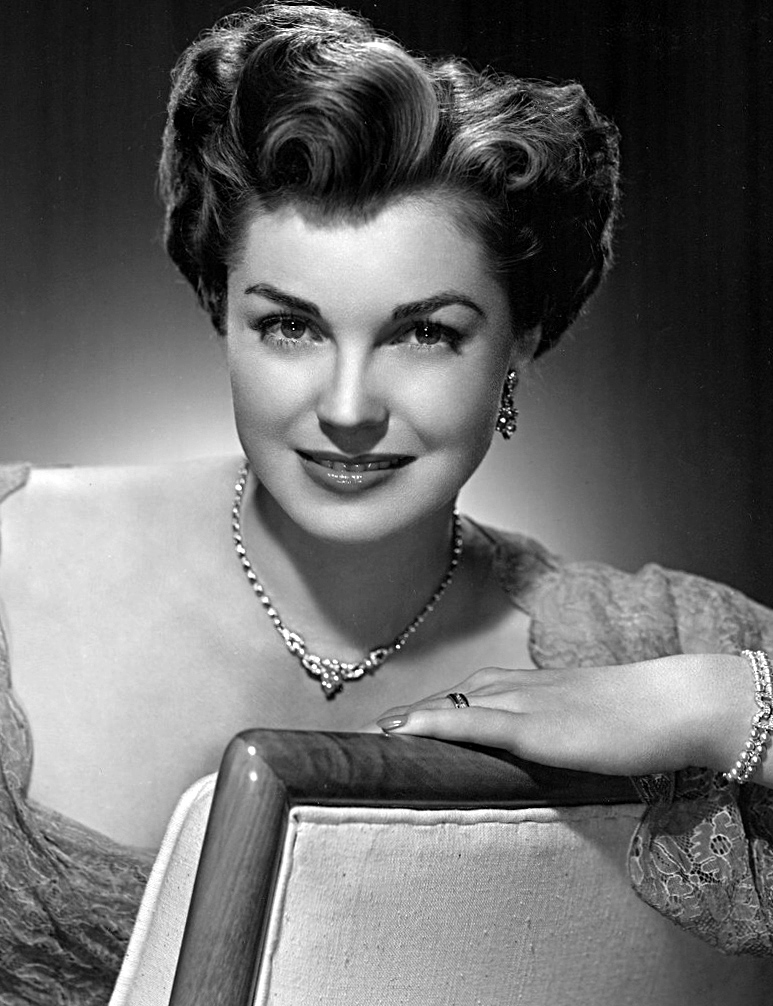
- Williams in 1950
- Born: Esther Jane Williams; August 8, 1921; Inglewood, California, U.S.
- Died: June 6, 2013 (aged 91); Beverly Hills, California, U.S.
- Education: Los Angeles City College
- Occupations: Swimmer; actress
- Years active: 1942–1963
- Height: 5 ft 8 in (173 cm)
- Spouses: Leonard Kovner (m. 1940; div. 1944) Ben Gage (m. 1945; div. 1958) Fernando Lamas (m. 1969; died 1982) Edward Bell (m. 1994)
- Children: 3
- Website: esther-williams.com

Esther Jane Williams (August 8, 1921 – June 6, 2013) was an American competitive swimmer and actress. She set regional and national records in her late teens on the Los Angeles Athletic Club swim team. Unable to compete in the 1940 Summer Olympics because of the outbreak of World War II, she joined Billy Rose's Aquacade, where she took on the role vacated by Eleanor Holm after the show's move from New York City to San Francisco. While in the city, she spent five months swimming alongside Olympic gold medal-winner and Tarzan star Johnny Weissmuller. Williams caught the attention of Metro-Goldwyn-Mayer scouts at the Aquacade. After appearing in several small roles, then with Mickey Rooney in an Andy Hardy film, and with future five-time co-star Van Johnson in A Guy Named Joe, Williams made a series of films in the 1940s and early 1950s known as "aquamusicals", which featured elaborate performances with synchronised swimming and diving.

Every year from 1945 to 1949, Williams had at least one film among the twenty highest-grossing films of the year. In 1952 Williams appeared in her only biographical role, as Australian swimming star Annette Kellerman in Million Dollar Mermaid, which went on to become her nickname while she was at MGM. Williams left MGM in 1956 and appeared in a handful of unsuccessful feature films, followed by several extremely popular water-themed network television specials, including one from Cypress Gardens, Florida.

Williams was also a successful businesswoman. Before retiring from acting, she invested in a "service station, a metal products plant, a manufacturer of bathing suits, various properties, and a successful restaurant chain known as Trails." She lent her name to a line of swimming pools, retro swimwear, and instructional swimming videos for children and then later served as a commentator for synchronized swimming at the 1984 Summer Olympics in Los Angeles.

== Early years ==
Esther Jane Williams was born on August 8, 1921, in Inglewood, California, the fifth and youngest child of Louis Stanton Williams (January 19, 1886 – June 10, 1968) and Bula Myrtle (née Gilpin; October 8, 1885 – December 29, 1971). Louis and Bula lived on neighboring farms in Kansas and carried on a nine-year courtship until June 1, 1908, when they eloped and set off for California. However, they ran out of money in Salt Lake City, Utah, and settled there. Esther's brother Stanton (September 4, 1912 – March 3, 1929) was discovered by actress Marjorie Rambeau, which led to the family (including her two sisters Maurine and June and brother David) moving to the Los Angeles area to be near the studios. Louis Williams purchased a small piece of land in the southwest part of town and had a house built there. Esther was born in the living room, which was also where the family slept until Louis Williams was able to add bedrooms. In 1929 Stanton Williams died after his colon burst. He was only 16 years old.

In 1935 Bula Williams invited 16-year-old Buddy McClure to live with the family. McClure had recently lost his mother, and Bula was still grieving over the death of her son Stanton. Esther recounted in her autobiography that one night, when the rest of the family was visiting relatives in Alhambra, McClure raped her. She was terrified to tell anyone about the incident and waited two years before finally revealing the truth to her parents. Bula seemed unsure about Esther's story, claiming McClure was "sensitive", and later felt sympathetic toward him when he admitted his guilt. However, Bula banished him from her home. McClure joined the United States Coast Guard, and Williams never saw him again.

== Career ==
=== Competitive swimming ===
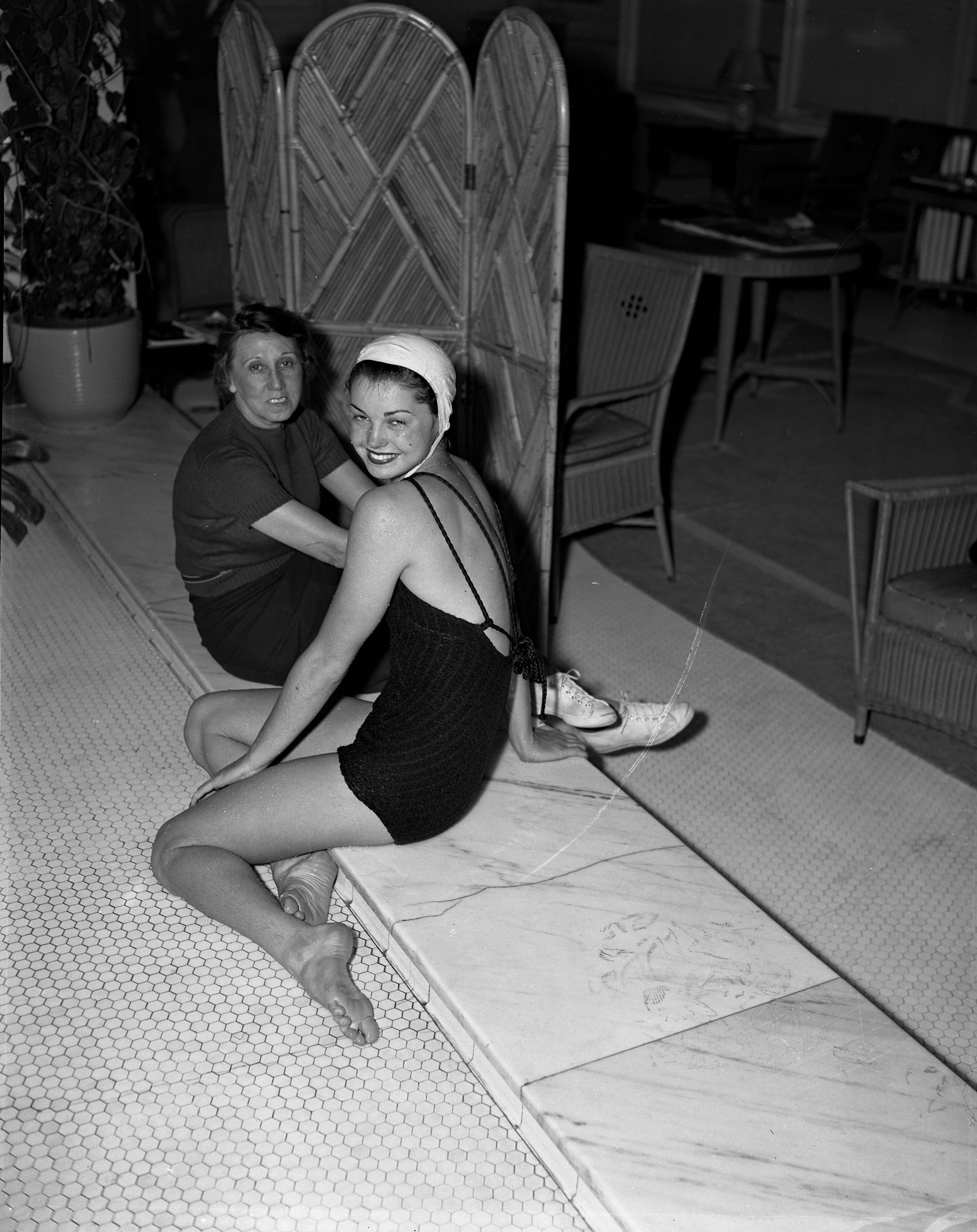
Williams (in swimsuit) at the Los Angeles Athletic Club in 1939

Williams was enthusiastic about swimming in her youth. Her older sister Maurine took her to Manhattan Beach and to the local pool. Esther took a job counting towels at the pool to pay the five-cent entry fee, and while there, she had swimming lessons from the male lifeguards. From them she learned the "male only" swimming strokes, including the butterfly, with which she would later break records.

Her medley team set the record for the 300-yard relay at the Los Angeles Athletic Club in 1939 and was also the national AAU champion in the 100-meter freestyle, with a record-breaking time of 1 minute 9.0 seconds. By age 16 Williams had won three U.S. national championships in breaststroke and freestyle swimming.

Williams graduated from Washington High School (now known as Washington Preparatory High School) in Los Angeles in 1939, where she served as class vice president and later president. However, Williams never trained in swimming while there.

During her senior year Williams received a D in her algebra course, preventing her from getting a scholarship to the University of Southern California. She enrolled in Los Angeles City College to retake the course. In 1939 Williams expressed interest in pursuing a degree in physical education in order to teach it one day. To earn money for tuition, Williams worked as a stock girl at the I. Magnin department store, where she also modeled clothing for customers and appeared in newspaper advertisements.

While Williams was working at I. Magnin, she was contacted by Billy Rose's assistant and asked to audition as a replacement for Eleanor Holm in his Aquacade show. Williams impressed Rose and she got the role. The Aquacade was part of the Golden Gate International Exposition, and Williams was partnered with Olympic swimmer and Tarzan star Johnny Weissmuller, who, according to Williams' autobiography, repeatedly tried to seduce her. Despite this, she remained with the show until it closed on September 29, 1940. Williams had planned to compete in the 1940 Summer Olympics, which were cancelled due to the outbreak of World War II. Sometime in the mid to late 1950s, NBC built a large studio with a huge swimming pool on Avenue M between E 14th and E 15th St. in Brooklyn, New York. The intent was, according to local rumors, that Esther Williams was going to have a show from the studio. It never occurred. The building remained empty until 1959/1960, when the “Steve Allen Show” was brought to the studios and televised live on Sunday evenings.

=== Acting ===
It was at the Aquacade that Williams first attracted attention from Metro-Goldwyn-Mayer scouts. MGM's head, Louis B. Mayer, had been looking for a female sports star for the studio to compete with Fox's figure-skating star Sonja Henie. Williams signed with MGM in 1941.

In her contract were two clauses: the first being that she receive a guest pass to The Beverly Hills Hotel, where she could swim in the pool every day, and the second, that she would not appear on camera for nine months to allow for acting, singing, dancing, and diction lessons beforehand. Williams wrote in her autobiography, "If it took nine months for a baby to be born, I figured my 'birth' from Esther Williams the swimmer to Esther Williams the movie actress would not be much different."

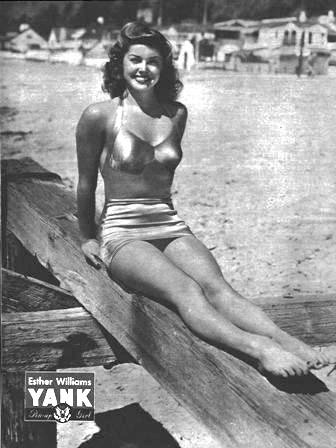
A pin-up of Williams from a 1945 issue of Yank, the Army Weekly

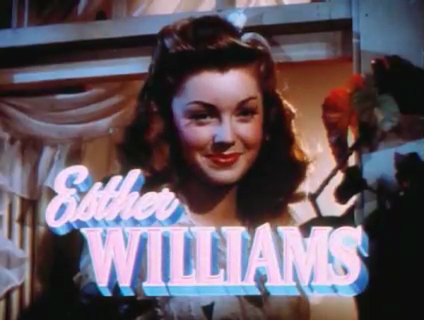
Esther Williams in Thrill of a Romance (1945)

While top stars at the studios such as Judy Garland, Betty Grable, and Shirley Temple took part in bond tours during the war, Williams was asked to take in hospital tours. At this point Williams had achieved pin-up status because of the number of photographs of her in bathing suits. To prepare, Williams and her publicity assistant would listen to Bob Hope and Jack Benny's radio programs, then retell the funniest jokes while at the hospitals. Williams also invited GIs to dance with her on stage and take part in mock screen tests. The men would be given their lines on a card, and they would act out the scene in front of the other soldiers. These tests were always romantic scenes, which the men were required to refuse to do multiple times. When the men said the final "No", Williams would pull off her tear-away skirt and sweater, leaving nothing on but a gold lamé swimsuit. The scenes would always end with the men giving in and kissing her after that stunt. Her hospital tours continued into the 1950s. A (forged) signed waterproof portrait of Williams was circulated among men in the United States Navy for a "capture the Esther" competition. This competition continues to this day in the Royal Australian Navy, which holds in its archives an "original" forged signed portrait while maintaining a "capturable" image for use in the fleet.

=== 1940s ===
Three weeks after Williams signed her contract, George Sidney directed her first screen test. According to Williams' autobiography, the studio used this test to get Lana Turner back in line with the terms of her contract and as punishment for Turner's having eloped with Artie Shaw. Williams screen tested with the leading man Clark Gable for the film Somewhere I'll Find You. However, when Turner divorced Shaw after four months of marriage, she rejoined the film. Following several short subject films, Williams appeared as Sheila Brooks in Andy Hardy's Double Life. Sheila was a student with whom Andy falls in love. Next was a small part in the film A Guy Named Joe, starring Spencer Tracy and Irene Dunne. It was on this title that she first worked with Van Johnson, with whom she would partner in a total of five films.

Bathing Beauty, previously titled Mr. Coed, starred Red Skelton as a man who enrolls in a women's college to win back his swimming instructor fiancée, played by Williams. This was her first Technicolor musical. The studio changed the film title to showcase Williams. Almost all of the film posters featured Williams in a bathing suit, though the swimming sequences make up a small portion of the film. Her date to the premiere at the Astor Theater in New York City was future husband Ben Gage. For the event MGM publicity set up a six-story-tall billboard of Williams diving into Times Square with a large sign that said "Come on in! The story's fine!"

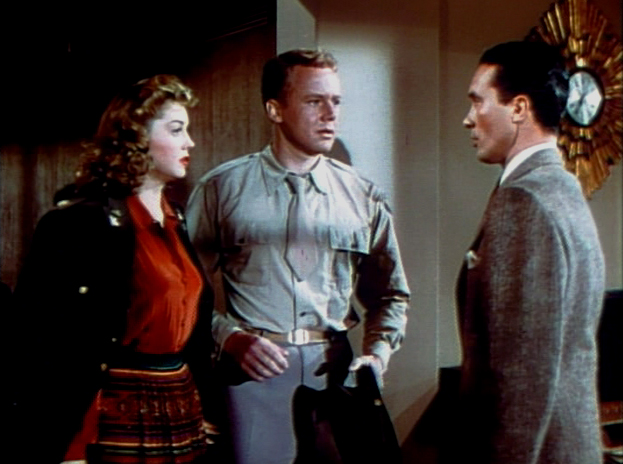
Williams, Van Johnson and Carleton G. Young in Thrill of a Romance (1945)

Williams appeared as herself in the number "A Water Ballet" for the musical revue Ziegfeld Follies. This was followed by the musical Thrill of a Romance. Van Johnson co-starred as a decorated war veteran who falls in love with Williams while she is on her honeymoon. Thrill of a Romance was the eighth highest-grossing film of 1945. The studio's publicity department tried to put the two stars together in public as much as possible in the hopes of encouraging a romance, even though Williams was involved with Ben Gage at the time. When asked why they did not date, Johnson replied, "Because I'm afraid she can't get her webbed feet into a pair of evening sandals."

Williams tried a more serious role in The Hoodlum Saint (1946), with William Powell and Angela Lansbury. Audiences expected Powell's Nick Charles persona and rejected the idea of a romance between Williams and Powell onscreen due to their age difference. She also appeared in Easy to Wed, a remake of 1936's Libeled Lady, with Johnson and Lucille Ball. It was the first singing part in a film for Williams, who had Harriet Lee as her singing teacher. She even had the added challenge of singing in Portuguese with the song "Boneca de Pixe".

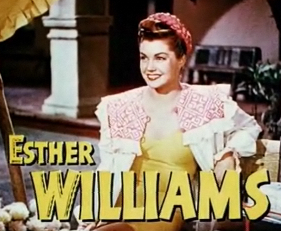
Williams as Maria in Fiesta (1947)

Fiesta (originally called Fiesta Brava) starred Williams as Ricardo Montalbán's twin sister Maria, who pretends to be her bullfighting brother in hopes of luring him back home. Audiences and Williams thought the film was silly, as Williams and Montalbán had vastly different accents. Montalbán was born in Mexico and was a native Spanish speaker while Williams had a Midwestern accent picked up from her Kansas-born parents. Production was difficult with a multitude of problems. By 1947 Ben Gage and Williams were married. Gage had traveled to Mexico for the making of the film. He got into a fight with an employee of the cast's hotel, was arrested, and was subsequently thrown out of the country. The director of photography Sidney Wagner and one other crew member died of cholera from eating contaminated street food. Many of the film's stuntmen were sent to the hospital after being gored by bulls. Director Dick Thorpe had not wanted the bulls killed (as they usually were at the end of a bullfight) because he believed them to be too expensive to replace.

After filming was completed on Fiesta, Williams appeared in the romance This Time for Keeps (1947) with singer Johnnie Johnston. In 1948 Williams signed a contract with swimwear company Cole of California to appear as their spokesperson, and Williams and the other swimmers in her films wore Cole swimsuits. Since the aquamusical was an entirely new genre, the studio's costume designers had little experience creating practical swimsuits. William's plaid flannel swimsuit for This Time for Keeps was so heavy that she was dragged to the bottom of the pool and had to unzip the suit, swimming naked to the edge of the pool to avoid drowning. Cole swimsuits used latex, which meant zippers were no longer necessary. While filming Skirts Ahoy! (1952), Williams discovered that members of the WAVES program received thin cotton, shapeless swimsuits as part of their uniforms. Williams modeled a Cole swimsuit for the Secretary of the Navy and explained that the new swimsuits helped support women's figures. The United States Navy ordered 50,000 suits immediately.

Filming the period musical Take Me Out to the Ball Game (1949) was, according to Williams, an experience of "pure misery". Gene Kelly and Frank Sinatra's characters were players on a baseball team owned by K.C. Higgins, played by Williams. She claimed that Kelly and co-writer Stanley Donen treated her with contempt and went out of their way to make jokes at her expense. The film was well-received critically and became a major commercial success, raking in $3.4 million in rentals and becoming the 11th highest-earning film of the year. Williams made Neptune's Daughter (also 1949) around the same time with co-stars Ricardo Montalbán, Red Skelton, and Betty Garrett, who had also been in Take Me Out to the Ball Game. In the film, Williams sings "Baby, It's Cold Outside" with Montalbán. The song won the Academy Award for Best Original Song at the 22nd Academy Awards. Williams and Montalbán were originally slated to sing "On a Slow Boat to China", but studio censors thought the song was too sexual (interpreting the word "get" as "have") and instead gave them "Baby, It's Cold Outside." Neptune's Daughter became the 10th highest-grossing film of 1949.

=== 1950s ===
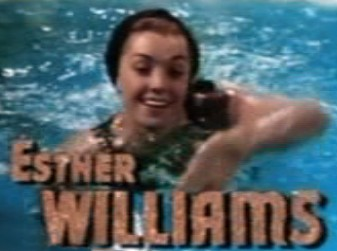
Williams as Annette Kellermann in Million Dollar Mermaid (1952)

Williams made Duchess of Idaho (1950), shot on location in Sun Valley, Idaho, co-starring Van Johnson and John Lund. MGM paired her with Howard Keel for three films, Pagan Love Song (also 1950), Texas Carnival (1951), and later Jupiter's Darling (1955). They both had cameos in the film Callaway Went Thataway (1951).

In Million Dollar Mermaid (1952) Williams portrayed Annette Kellermann, a real-life Australian swimming and diving star. Williams co-starred with Victor Mature, who played Kellermann's husband and manager, James Sullivan. The two engaged in a passionate affair during filming. Williams often called this her favourite film and named her autobiography after it. Williams also won the Henrietta Award at the 1952 Golden Globes for World Film Favorite – Female. Easy to Love (1953), also with Van Johnson, was filmed on location in Cypress Gardens, Florida, where a swimming pool in the shape of the state had been built specifically for the film. Williams was pregnant during shooting but still performed all her own waterskiing stunts.

In Dangerous When Wet (also 1953) Williams worked with three important male co-stars – Tom and Jerry and her future husband Fernando Lamas. During casting, Lamas told Williams he did not want to star in the film with her because he only wanted to be involved in "important pictures". His part had to be rewritten to persuade him to take part in the film.

During 1953 Williams and writers Leo Pogostin and Chuck Walters came up with a script idea for a film to be titled Athena. She then went on maternity leave for three months, pregnant with her daughter Susan, and assumed she would go straight to work on the film Athena upon her return. However, production started without her, and the studio cast Jane Powell in the lead role, requiring a rewrite of much of the original premise. The studio moved her to Jupiter's Darling. Two more films were planned, Bermuda Encounter and Olympic Venus, about the first Olympic swimmers; however, these were never made.

Many of her MGM films, such as Million Dollar Mermaid and Jupiter's Darling, contained elaborately staged synchronized swimming scenes with considerable risk to Williams. She broke her neck filming a 115 ft dive off a tower during a climactic musical number in Million Dollar Mermaid and was in a body cast for seven months. She subsequently recovered, although she continued to suffer headaches as a result of the accident. Her many hours spent submerged in a studio tank resulted in ruptured eardrums numerous times. She also nearly drowned after not being able to find the trapdoor in the ceiling of a tank. The walls and ceiling were painted black and the trapdoor blended in. Williams was pulled out only because a member of the crew realized the door was not opening.

=== After MGM ===
After 15 years of appearing in films, Williams was threatened with contract suspension from MGM after refusing the lead role in The Opposite Sex, a musical remake of 1939's The Women that was released in 1956. The role of Mary would have been rewritten to be an aquacade star—instead, June Allyson was cast in the role as Kay, a nightclub singer. Knowing that she was slowly being phased out of MGM by being given projects that were bound to be flops, Williams preferred to avoid the embarrassment and indignity of such an ending to her career. She redecorated her dressing room to accommodate returning star Grace Kelly, packed her terry cloth robes and swimsuits, and drove off the studio lot. As a result of leaving her contract, Williams lost almost $3 million in deferred contract payments, which had been taken from her paychecks over the previous 14 years and put aside as both a nest egg and a tax deferral. She was, however, still able to collect on the $50,000 signing bonus from when she first signed her contract.

In 1956 she moved to Universal International and appeared in a non-musical dramatic film, The Unguarded Moment. After that, her film career slowly wound down. She later admitted that husband Fernando Lamas preferred her not to continue in films. She would, however, make occasional appearances on television, including mystery guest spots for What's My Line?, The Donna Reed Show, The Ed Sullivan Show, and two aqua-specials, The Esther Williams Aqua Spectacle held in London at The Empire Pool Wembley in 1956 and Esther Williams at Cypress Gardens which was telecast on August 8, 1960. More than half of all television sets in use in the United States were tuned in to watch the Cypress Gardens special. In 1966, Williams was inducted into the International Swimming Hall of Fame.

== Later years ==
Williams retired from acting in the early 1960s and later turned down the role of Belle Rosen, a character with a crucial swimming scene, in The Poseidon Adventure. (The role eventually went to Shelley Winters.)

She continued to lend her name to a line of retro women's swimwear. Williams said, "Women worldwide are fighting a thing called gravity ... I say to women when I talk to them, 'You girls of 18 have until about 25, 30 at the most, and then you have to report to me. My suits are quality fabric.'" She went on: "I put you in a suit that contains you and you will swim in. I don't want you to be in two Dixie cups and a fish line."

She was also the namesake of a company that manufactures swimming pools and swimming pool accessories. She came out with a line of Swim, Baby, Swim videos, which helped parents teach their children how to swim. She stepped in as a commentator for synchronized swimming at the 1984 Summer Olympics. Williams met her fourth husband as a result of his calling her to coordinate her appearance. She co-wrote her autobiography, The Million Dollar Mermaid (New York: Simon & Schuster, 1999), with popular media critic and author Digby Diehl. In 1994 she made her first new big-screen appearance in 31 years as one of the hosts of the retrospective That's Entertainment! III.

In a 2007 interview with Diane Sawyer, Williams admitted that she had recently suffered a stroke. "I opened my eyes and I could see, but I couldn't remember anything from the past", she said. In June 2008, Williams was able to attend Cyd Charisse's funeral, albeit in a wheelchair.

In April 2010, Williams appeared at the first Turner Classic Movies Classic Film Festival in Hollywood, California, alongside two-time co-star Betty Garrett. Their film, Neptune's Daughter (1949), was screened at the pool of the Roosevelt Hotel, along with a performance of the Williams-inspired synchronized swimming troupe, The Waterlilies. South Beach Miami's 2010 Mercedes Benz Fashion Week Swim, a showcase of designer swimwear, included a Williams suit, complete with a beach summer theme and sand palette with aqua accents.

In 2000 an account of Williams's life and career appeared in the Swedish book Esther Williams — Skenbiografin (Esther Williams: The Fake Biography) written by Jane Magnusson, in which the author shares with readers her own fascination for art swimming as a genre and her opinion of Williams as both a bewildering and mesmerizing front figure and icon in this field.

== Personal life ==
=== Political views ===
Williams was a registered Republican.

=== Marriages ===
Williams married four times. She met her first husband, Leonard Kovner, while attending Los Angeles City College. She later wrote in her autobiography, The Million Dollar Mermaid, that "he was smart, handsome, dependable ... and dull. I respected his intelligence and his dedication to a future career in medicine. He loved me, or so he said, and even asked me to marry him." They were married in the San Francisco suburb of Los Altos on June 27, 1940. On their split she said, "I found, much to my relief, that all I needed for my emotional and personal security was my own resolve and determination. I didn't need a marriage and a ring. I had come to realize all too quickly that Leonard Kovner was not a man I could ever really love." They divorced on September 12, 1944.

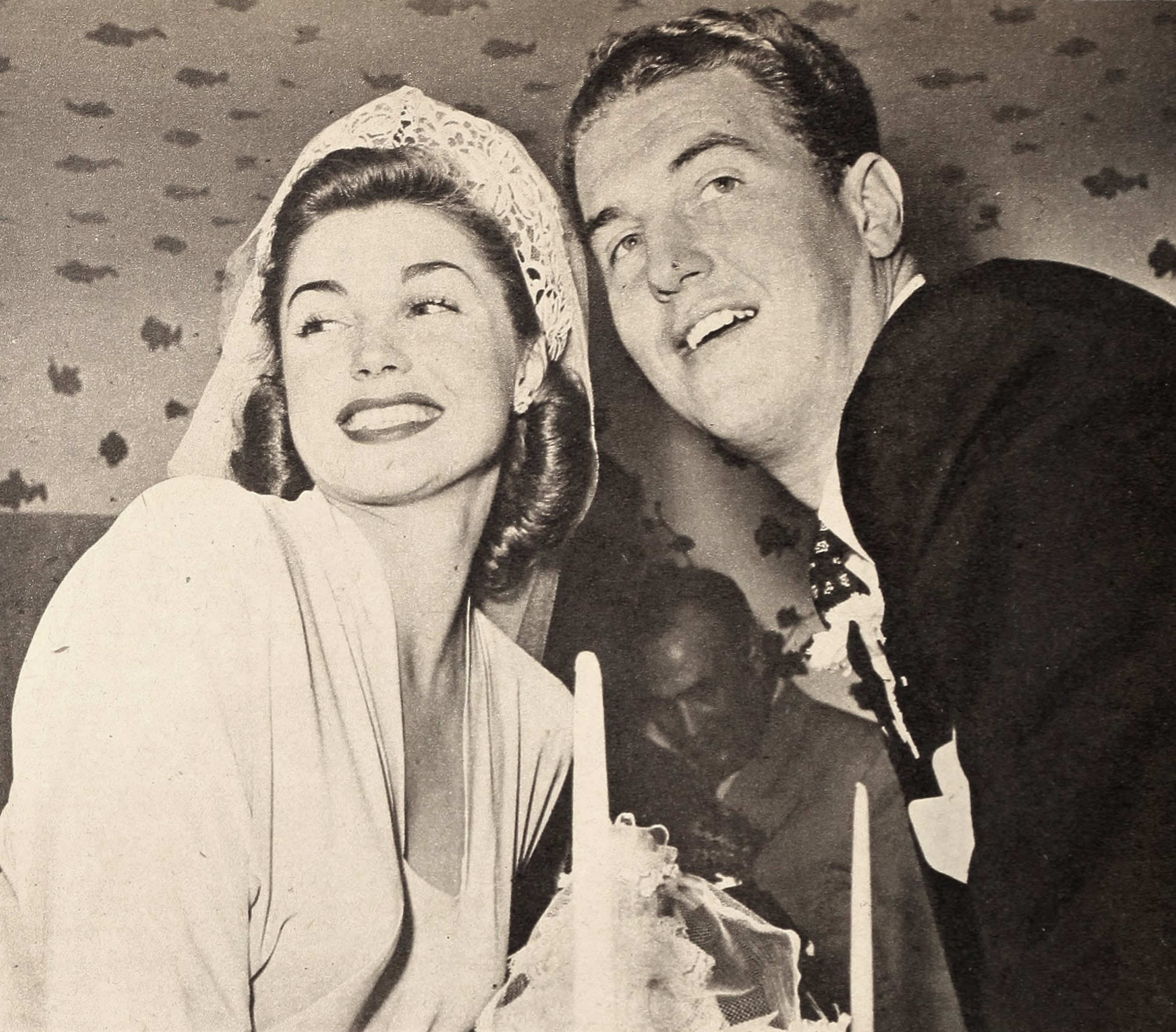
1945 wedding photo of Williams and her second husband, Ben Gage

She married singer/actor Ben Gage on November 25, 1945; they had three children: Benjamin Stanton (born August 6, 1949), Kimball Austin (October 30, 1950 – May 6, 2008), and Susan Tenney (born October 1, 1953). In her autobiography, she portrayed Gage as an alcoholic parasite who squandered $10 million of her earnings. Gage and Williams separated in 1952 and divorced in April 1959.

During the filming of Pagan Love Song in Hawaii, Williams learned she was pregnant with her third child and notified the studio in California. Gage had met a man at the hotel who owned a ham radio and persuaded the man to let them use it to call California. What they failed to realize at the time, though, was that anyone could be listening in on their conversation, and news of her pregnancy was broadcast to the entire West Coast.

She disclosed in her autobiography that she had an affair with actor Victor Mature while they were working on Million Dollar Mermaid, citing that at the time her marriage was in trouble and, feeling lonely, she turned to Mature for love and affection, and he gave her all she wanted. The affair ended while Williams was recovering from her fall during the shoot. She was romantically linked with Jeff Chandler. She claims in her autobiography that Chandler was a cross-dresser and that she broke off the relationship. According to the Los Angeles Times, many friends and colleagues of Chandler rebutted Williams's claims. Jane Russell commented, "I've never heard of such a thing. Cross-dressing is the last thing I would expect of Jeff. He was a sweet guy, definitely all man."

She married her former lover, Argentine actor/director Fernando Lamas, on December 31, 1969. She later claimed that for 13 years she lived in total submission to him. She had to stop being "Esther Williams" and could not have her children live with her. In return, he would be faithful. They remained married until Lamas's death from pancreatic cancer on October 8, 1982.

She resided in Beverly Hills with actor husband Edward Bell, whom she married on October 24, 1994.

=== LSD ===
In September 1959, Cary Grant told Look magazine that he had taken LSD under a doctor's supervision and it had changed his life. Grant's therapist, Mortimer Hartman, described LSD as "a psychic energizer which empties the subconscious and intensifies emotion and memory a hundred times". Grant said that, with the help of LSD, he had "found that [he] had a tough inner core of strength", and that when he was young, he "was very dependent upon older men and women. Now, people [came] to [him] for help." Williams stated that she wanted to be one of those people. As she said in Million Dollar Mermaid, "At that point, I really didn't know who I was. Was I that glamorous femme fatale? ... Was I just another broken-down divorcée whose husband left her with all the bills and three kids?" Shortly after reading the article, she contacted Grant. He called his doctor and made an appointment for her. Williams said LSD seemed like instant psychoanalysis.

== Death and legacy ==
Esther Williams died in her sleep on June 6, 2013, from natural causes in her Los Angeles home. She was 91. She was cremated, and her ashes were scattered in the Pacific Ocean.

On her death, CNN quoted her International Swimming Hall of Fame biography, saying, "Her movie career played a major role in the promotion of swimming, making it attractive to the public, contributing to the growth of the sport as a public recreation for health, exercise, water safety – and just plain fun." Her stepson Lorenzo Lamas tweeted she was "The best swim teacher and soul mom." Actress Annabeth Gish tweeted a tribute, writing that Esther Williams was an "elegant, gracious movie star, legend and neighbor". Film historian Leonard Maltin called her "a major, major star, a tremendous box office attraction."

For her contribution to the motion-picture industry, Williams has a star on the Hollywood Walk of Fame at 1560 Vine Street. She left her hand and footprints in front of Grauman's Chinese Theatre on August 1, 1944.

Scarlett Johansson's character DeeAnna Moran in the 2016 Coen Brothers film Hail, Caesar! shares several similarities with Williams, most notably being an aquamusical star who becomes pregnant during production.

== Archive ==
Esther Williams donated her personal film archive, including twenty home movies, to the Academy Film Archive. The Academy Film Archive has subsequently preserved several of these home movies.

== Filmography ==
Film
| Year | Title | Role | Notes |
|---|---|---|---|
| 1942 | Andy Hardy's Double Life | Sheila Brooks | |
| 1942 | Personalities | Sheila Brooks (Screen test footage) | Short subject |
| 1942 | Inflation | Mrs. Smith | Short film |
| 1943 | A Guy Named Joe | Ellen Bright | |
| 1944 | Bathing Beauty | Caroline Brooks | |
| 1945 | Thrill of a Romance | Cynthia Glenn | |
| 1945 | Ziegfeld Follies | Herself | ('A Water Ballet') |
| 1946 | The Hoodlum Saint | Kay Lorrison | |
| 1946 | Easy to Wed | Connie Allenbury Chandler | |
| 1946 | Till the Clouds Roll By | Herself | Uncredited |
| 1947 | Fiesta | Maria Morales | |
| 1947 | This Time for Keeps | Leonora 'Nora' Cambaretti | |
| 1948 | On an Island with You | Rosalind Reynolds | |
| 1949 | Take Me Out to the Ball Game | K.C. Higgins | |
| 1949 | Neptune's Daughter | Eve Barrett | |
| 1950 | Duchess of Idaho | Christine Riverton Duncan | |
| 1950 | Pagan Love Song | Mimi Bennett | |
| 1951 | Texas Carnival | Debbie Telford | |
| 1951 | Callaway Went Thataway | Herself | Uncredited |
| 1952 | Skirts Ahoy! | Whitney Young | |
| 1952 | Million Dollar Mermaid | Annette Kellerman | |
| 1953 | Dangerous When Wet | Katie Higgins | |
| 1953 | Easy to Love | Julie Hallerton | |
| 1954 | Athena | – | Screenwriter; Uncredited |
| 1955 | Jupiter's Darling | Amytis | |
| 1955 | 1955 Motion Picture Theatre Celebration | Herself | Short subject |
| 1956 | The Unguarded Moment | Lois Conway | |
| 1956 | Screen Snapshots: Hollywood, City of Stars | Herself | Short subject |
| 1958 | Raw Wind in Eden | Laura | |
| 1961 | The Big Show | Hillary Allen | |
| 1963 | Magic Fountain | Hyacinth Tower | |
| 1994 | That's Entertainment! III | Herself | |

Television
| Year | Title | Role | Notes |
|---|---|---|---|
| 1955 | What's My Line | Guest Celebrity | Episode: "16 January 1955" |
| 1957 | Lux Video Theatre | Vicki | Episode: "The Armed Venus" |
| 1960 | The Donna Reed Show | Molly | Episode: "The Career Woman" |
| 1960 | Dick Powell's Zane Grey Theatre | Sarah Harmon | Episode: "The Black Wagon" |
| 1961 | The Bob Hope Show | | Episode: "The Bob Hope Buick Sports Awards Show" |

== Box office rankings ==
For a number of years, US movie exhibitors voted Esther Williams among the most popular film stars in the country:

- 1947 – 24th most popular star
- 1948 – 11th
- 1949 – 8th
- 1950 – 8th – also 2nd most popular star in the UK
- 1951 – 5th most popular female star
- 1952 – 12th
- 1953 – 12th
- 1954 – 25th

With the exception of The Hoodlum Saint and Jupiter's Darling, no film in which Williams starred for MGM lost money and some were extremely profitable.

== See also ==
- List of members of the International Swimming Hall of Fame
- Esther Williams Trophy

== General references ==
- Háy, Peter (1991). MGM: When the Lion Roars (1st ed.). Atlanta, Georgia: Turner Publishing, Inc. ISBN 978-1-878685-04-9. OCLC 499304130.
- Sherrow, Victoria (1996). The Encyclopedia of Women and Sports. Santa Barbara, California: ABC-CLIO. ISBN 978-0-87436-826-0. OCLC 34658767.
- Williams, Esther (1999). The Million Dollar Mermaid: An Autobiography (Autobiography) (First ed.). New York: Simon & Schuster. ISBN 978-0-15-601135-8. OCLC 43706619. Archived from the original on July 22, 2014.
- Wayne, Jane Ellen (2003). The Golden Girls of MGM: Greta Garbo, Joan Crawford, Lana Turner, Judy Garland, Ava Gardner, Grace Kelly, and Others (First ed.). New York: Carroll & Graf Publishers. ISBN 978-0-7867-1303-5. OCLC 54010001.
