= Esther Williams Trophy =

The Esther Williams Trophy is one of two trophies that have circulated among ships of various navies, after originating in the Royal Australian Navy (RAN). Initially, in 1943, the trophy was a joke between two friends, Lieutenants Lindsay Brand and David Stevenson (later the RAN's Chief of Naval Staff), serving in HMAS Nepal, an N-class destroyer attached to the British Eastern Fleet. Stevenson wrote on a photograph of Esther Williams, "To my own Georgie, with all my love and a passionate kiss, Esther"; Brand (aka "George") put the screen idol over his bed. The photo was taken to another ship by a fellow officer, and the "trophy" was then circulated by officers among some 200 other ships including in United States Navy, Royal Navy, and Royal Canadian Navy ships in Asian waters.

The original photo became the "trophy copy" to be kept in a safe location. A "fighting copy" was displayed where officers from other ships could attempt to steal it or take it by force, often with a good deal of roughhousing between the officers of the ships involved; one of the more violent raids, by officers of USS Boxer attempting to retrieve the trophy from HMAS Warramunga, resulted in three Americans and one Australian being hospitalised. After the "fighting copy" had been successfully removed from the custodial ship, the "trophy copy" would be presented to the new owners with appropriate ceremony. At various times, the holders of the trophy have either flown an Esther flag or sent naval signals (signed "Esther") to other nearby ships to indicate where the trophy resided. In 1946, an officer from HMS Jamaica started a tradition when he composed the "Esther Rescued" signal (indicating the trophy's changing of hands) in poetry.

In 1957, "Esther" was retired by the United States Navy and sent to the RAN's Naval Historical Collection at Spectacle Island in Sydney. The trophy was brought into circulation again in 1997 by officers from HMAS Brisbane, and has been given official standing by senior officers, for instance when an RAN admiral officiated when Brand was re-introduced to the trophy on 30 June 2004 for only the fourth time since 1943. A documentary about the trophy's history was produced in 2007.

Following the death of Esther Williams in June 2013, the trophy was officially retired. The last unit to officially capture the trophy, RAN Clearance Diving Team Four, presented the trophy to HMAS Stuart for transportation to the Navy Heritage Centre at Spectacle Island.
