= Gladys Lehman =

American screenwriter

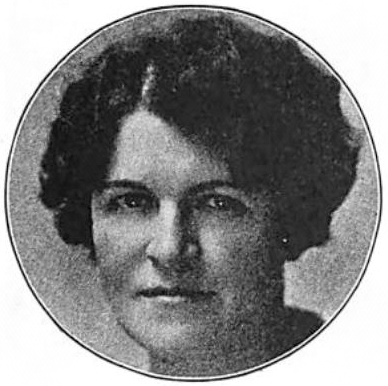
- From a 1928 advertisement
- Born: Gladys Collins; January 24, 1892; Gates, Oregon, US
- Died: April 7, 1993 (aged 101); Newport Beach, California, US
- Education: University of Idaho
- Spouse: Benjamin Lehman (m. 1915; div. 1928)

Gladys Lehman (née Collins; 1892–1993) was a prolific American screenwriter who had a long career in Hollywood.

== Biography ==
Lehman was born in Gates, Oregon, in 1892 to James Collins and Lois Gates. She was the eldest of the couple's four children, and she attended Wardner-Kellogg High School in Idaho.

As a college student, she was initiated into Gamma Phi Beta sorority at the Xi chapter at the University of Idaho. She later attended the University of California. She married Benjamin Lehman, an author and English professor at the University of California, Berkeley, in 1915; the pair had two sons (one who died as an infant), but divorced in the 1920s.

Gladys moved to Hollywood around 1925 and quickly made a career for herself, starting out as a reader at Universal Pictures. She was one of the founders of the Screen Writers Guild in 1933. Under contract at Universal from 1926 to 1932, she followed that with freelance work until the early 1950s. She was also one of the founding members of the Motion Picture Relief Fund.

As a screenwriter, she shared an Oscar nomination with Richard Connell for Best Original Screenplay for Two Girls and a Sailor in 1944.

Lehman died from pneumonia in Newport Beach, California on April 7, 1993.

== Partial filmography ==
- The Ice Flood (1926) (scenario)
- Out All Night (1927) (story)
- On Your Toes (1927)
- The Shield of Honor (1928) (adaptation / screenplay)
- Red Hot Speed (1929) (screenplay / story)
- Clear the Decks (1929) (writer)
- His Lucky Day (1929) (screenplay / story)
- The Fall of Eve (1929) (adaptation)
- Broadway Scandals (1929) (scenario)
- The Broadway Hoofer (1929) (story / dialogue)
- Mexicali Rose (screenplay / story)
- Embarrassing Moments (1930)
- Personality (1930)
- The Little Accident (1930) (screenplay)
- A Lady Surrenders (1930) (adaptation and scenario)
- The Cat Creeps (1930)
- La voluntad del muerto (1930) (adaptation and scenario)
- Seed (1931)
- Nice Women (1931)
- Strictly Dishonorable (1931) (screenplay)
- A Father Without Knowing It (1932) (screenplay)
- Back Street (1932)
- They Just Had to Get Married (1933) (screenplay)
- Hold Me Tight (1933) (writer)
- White Woman (1933) (screenplay)
- Death Takes a Holiday (1934) (screenplay)
- Double Door (1934)
- Little Miss Marker (1934) (screenplay)
- Enter Madame (1935)
- The County Chairman (1935) (screenplay)
- George White's 1935 Scandals (1935) (contributing to treatment - uncredited)
- It's a Small World (1935)
- In Old Kentucky (1935)
- Song and Dance Man (1936) (contributing writer - uncredited)
- A Message to Garcia (1936)
- Captain January (1936) (screenplay)
- Poor Little Rich Girl (1936) (screenplay)
- Reunion (1936)
- Slave Ship (1937) (screenplay)
- Midnight Madonna (1937)
- She Married an Artist (1937) (screenplay)
- There's Always a Woman (1938) (screenplay)
- The Lady Objects (1938) (screenplay)
- There's That Woman Again (1939) (play)
- Good Girls Go to Paris (1939) (writer)
- Blondie Brings Up Baby (1939) (screenplay)
- Hired Wife (1940) (screenplay)
- Nice Girl? (1941) (screenplay)
- Her First Beau (1941) (screenplay)
- Rio Rita (1942) (screenplay)
- Presenting Lily Mars (1943) (screenplay)
- Two Girls and a Sailor (1944) (original screenplay)
- Thrill of a Romance (1945) (original screenplay)
- Her Highness and the Bellboy (1945)
- This Time for Keeps (1947) (screenplay)
- Luxury Liner (1948) (screenplay)
- Sorrowful Jones (1949) (adaptation)
- Golden Girl (1951) (screenplay)
