= Jane Isbell =

American actress

- Jane Isbell, c.1939
- Born: Clarita Jane Isbell; May 1, 1927; Meridian, Mississippi, U.S.
- Died: 19 October 1981 (aged 54); Los Angeles, U.S.
- Resting place: Forest Lawn Memorial Park (Glendale)
- Occupation: Actress
- Years active: 1939-1948
- Spouse(s): Jack M. Althouse (m. 1947; ? 19??)

Jane Isbell (May 1, 1927 – October 19, 1981) was an American actress who appeared in smaller roles in some major films produced during Hollywood's Golden Era in the 1930s-1940s.

== Biography ==
She was born Clarita Jane Isbell in Meridian, Mississippi, the daughter of Theodore Clark Isbell and Elizabeth (Gully) Isbell. Her father was a Vaudeville performer, her mother a granddaughter of Chief Justice George Washington Stone (1811–1894) of the Alabama Supreme Court. Clark Isbell's great-great-grandfather was a colorful Revolutionary War soldier who once saved the life of Andrew Jackson. Clark Isbell's father was also a cousin of Alabama Governor William J. Samford.

The Isbells moved to Los Angeles when Jane was an infant. The elder of two sisters, she began modeling and appearing as an extra in films when only four years old. In 1932, she made her first Mickey McGuire comedy starring Mickey Rooney and would eventually make five films in the Mickey McGuire series, similar to the Our Gang films. She grew up with child stars for playmates and was among those tested for the role of Bonnie Butler in Gone with the Wind. She and Ann Gillis were best friends, working in several films together, usually with Gillis the featured player and Isbell an extra, stand-in or understudy. She was Gillis' understudy and stand-in for long shots on both Little Orphan Annie and The Adventures of Tom Sawyer, appearing as an extra in some scenes. She wrote her first article at age twelve, a piece published in Screen Book magazine (April 1939) about Mickey Rooney. She worked with him again in 1944 in National Velvet. In 1943 she played the role of Jane in The Youngest Profession, with the screenplay co-written by her cousin Jan Isbell Fortune.

She graduated high school in 1944, Franklin High School in Highland Park, Los Angeles, with special dramatic coaching, and studied art and journalism under John Morley. She appeared on several magazine covers, more often from her modeling work than acting, such as the cover of the Farm Journal and Farmer's Wife magazine in 1944. She also appeared in The Robert King Hollywood Hair Design Book (1948).

She married 11-29-1947 (Las Vegas) Lt. Jack Marvin Althouse, an investment banker and former Navy lieutenant (12 Apr 1919 – 12 Sept 2000). Her parents had kept her true age a secret, so newspaper articles at the time of her marriage claimed she was only seventeen years old although nearly twenty. These press statements ignored an earlier columnist who had leaked in the Los Angeles Evening Herald-Express that she would turn 18 on Apr. 31, 1945. Various newspaper articles mentioned that she was a cousin of ballplayers Frank Isbell of the Chicago White Sox and Cecil Isbell.

Several internet databases, including the IMDB and Flixster, have confused her with Frank Isbell's niece Jane who was born in Sedgwick, Kansas, September 12, 1927, and who also died in Los Angeles, unmarried, but was never an actress.

Jane Isbell's biggest roles were in forgettable B-movies, but as an extra she appeared in some of Hollywood's biggest successes, such as National Velvet (starring Elizabeth Taylor), Sergeant York (starring Gary Cooper), The Women (Norma Shearer, Joan Crawford, Rosalind Russell), Broadway Rhythm, The Thin Man Goes Home (William Powell and Myrna Loy), Little Orphan Annie, and The Adventures of Tom Sawyer. Frequently seen in the same frame with Hollywood's top stars, her face often appears in movie stills from a number of famous feature films. In Billy Wilder's The Major and the Minor, she was one of the wallflower girls doing Veronica Lake imitations, often called the funniest scene in this classic comedy.

== Filmography ==
- Luxury Liner (1948)
- Betty Co-Ed (1946) as Mrs. Leeds
- The Thin Man Goes Home (1945)
- Pride of the Marines (1945)
- Thrill of a Romance (1945) as Giggling Girl
- Mom and Dad (1945) as Mary Lou Gardner
- National Velvet (1944) as Schoolgirl Jane
- Broadway Rhythm (1944) as Co-ed in Drugstore
- Bathing Beauty (1944) as Western Union Girl
- Junior Jive Bombers (1944)
- The Youngest Profession (1943) as Jane
- Nobody's Darling (1943)
- The Major and the Minor (1942)
- Sergeant York (1941) as Gracie's sister
- Reaching for the Sun (1941) as Amos' Child
- I'm Still Alive (1940) as Mrs. Cady's Daughter
- The Women (1939) as Edith Potter's daughter
- Woman Doctor (1939)
- Little Orphan Annie (1938) as Annie (stand-in)
- The Adventures of Tom Sawyer (1938) as Becky Thatcher (stand-in)
