= Luxury Liner (1948 film) =

1948 film by Richard Whorf

- Thetarical release poster
- Directed by: Richard Whorf
- Written by: Gladys Lehman; Richard Connell; Karl Kamb (uncredited)
- Produced by: Joe Pasternak
- Starring: George Brent; Jane Powell; Lauritz Melchior; Frances Gifford; Marina Koshetz; Xavier Cugat
- Cinematography: Robert H. Planck
- Edited by: Robert Kern
- Music by: Adolph Deutsch
- Distributed by: Metro-Goldwyn-Mayer
- Release date: September 9, 1948
- Running time: 97-99 minutes
- Country: United States
- Language: English
- Budget: $2,178,000
- Box office: $4,128,000

Luxury Liner is a 1948 romantic musical comedy film produced by Metro-Goldwyn-Mayer in Technicolor. It was directed by Richard Whorf, and written by Richard Connell, Gladys Lehman and Karl Kamb (uncredited). It was originally titled Maiden Voyage.

An earlier film with the same title Luxury Liner (1933), starred George Brent and Zita Johann, and was directed by Lothar Mendes.

== Plot ==
Jeremy Bradford, the captain of an ocean liner, visits his teenaged daughter named Polly, and takes her to see a performance of the opera Aida. Polly is entranced by the singing talents of Olaf Eriksen and Zita Romanka.

Upon learning that Olaf and Zita will be passengers on her father's voyage to Rio de Janeiro, she begs her father to come along, but Captain Bradford says no. He is furious when he eventually discovers that Polly is on board his ship as a stowaway, and he puts her to work in the ship's galley.

Also on board is Laura Dene, a jilted bride, and her fiancé Charles, who can't decide if he wants to marry her. Polly and Laura become friends, though Laura isn't aware at first that Polly is the captain's daughter. Captain Bradford forgives Polly for stowing away, and he allows her to sing a duet with Olaf aboard ship. Polly is equally pleased when her father develops a romantic interest in Laura, which turns out to be mutual.

== Cast ==
- George Brent as Captain Jeremy Bradford
- Jane Powell as Polly Bradford
- Lauritz Melchior as Olaf Eriksen
- Frances Gifford as Laura Dene
- Marina Koshetz as Zita Romanka
- Xavier Cugat as himself
- Thomas E. Breen as Denis Mulvy
- Richard Derr as Charles G.K. Worton
- John Ridgely as Chief Officer Carver
- Connie Gilchrist as Bertha
- The Pied Pipers as Themselves
- Jane Isbell as Girl (uncredited)
- Caren Marsh Doll as Girl (uncredited)

== Reception ==
The film was a box-office hit for MGM, and earned $2,297,000 in the U.S. and Canada and $1,831,000 overseas, resulting in a profit of $428,000.
