= Lauritz Melchior =

Danish opera singer (1890–1973)

External audio
- Shellac Recordings and interviews in german with Lauritz Melchior in the Online Archive of the Österreichische Mediathek

Lauritz Melchior

Lauritz Melchior (born Lauritz Lebrecht Hommel Melchior, 20 March 1890 – 18 March 1973) was a Danish-American opera singer. He was the preeminent Wagnerian heldentenor of the 1920s through the 1940s and has come to be considered the quintessence of his voice type. Late in his career, Melchior appeared in movie musicals and on radio and television. He also made numerous recordings.

== Biography ==
=== Early years ===
Melchior was born Lauritz Lebrecht Hommel Melchior in Copenhagen, Denmark on 20 March 1890. His father was the rector for a private school for boys in Copenhagen, and he received his own childhood education at this school beginning in the year 1896. He grew up singing as a treble in the chorus at St. Alban's Church, Copenhagen. His early music development was also shaped by his older sister, Agnes Melchior (1883–1945), who was blind. Her disability necessitated that she needed a chaperone to the many concerts and operas she attended, and Lauritz was often called upon from a young age to accompany his sister to these events which enhanced his enthusiasm for and knowledge of opera and classical music.

In 1908 Melchior entered the Royal Opera School in Copenhagen where he was a voice student of Paul Bang. He studied voice with Bang until 1912 during which time he also studied acting with Peter Jerndorff. In 1913 he made his professional opera debut in Copenhagen at the Royal Danish Theatre in the baritone role of Silvio in Ruggero Leoncavallo's Pagliacci. He sang mostly secondary baritone and bass roles for the Royal Danish Opera and provincial Scandinavian opera companies for the next few years.

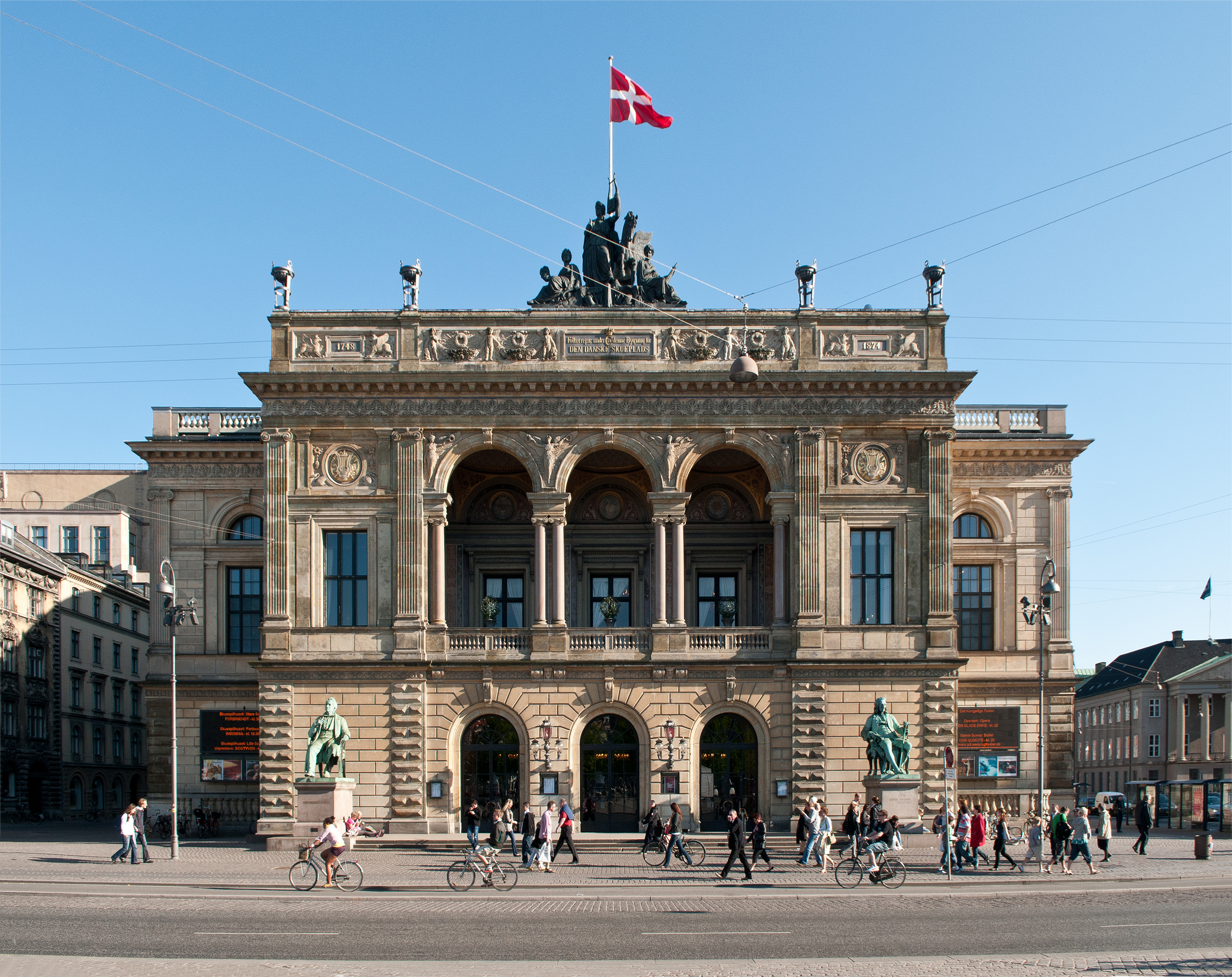
The Royal Danish Theatre, where Melchior made his operatic debut

One night, while on tour, Melchior helped an ailing soprano performing in Il trovatore by singing a high C in the Act IV Leonara and De Luna duet. The American contralto Mme Charles Cahier, who was singing the role of Azucena, was impressed by the tone she had heard and gave her young colleague sound advice: he was no baritone, but a tenor "with the lid on." She even contacted the Royal Opera pleading that Melchior be given a sabbatical and a stipend to restudy his voice. This he did during 1917 and 1918, studying with the noted Danish tenor Vilhelm Herold (1865–1937) who had sung Wagnerian roles at Covent Garden, the Chicago Opera and elsewhere from 1900 to 1915. This proved to be a turning point in Melchior's career. His high baritone voice was recast into that of a low tenor, but with a strong high extension. His second debut was on 8 October 1918 in the title role of Tannhäuser, also at the Royal Opera in Copenhagen.

In 1920, Melchior visited England to sing in an experimental radio broadcast to the Scandinavian capital cities from the Marconi station in Chelmsford. From 1920, Melchior was a frequent performer in London, appearing at Sir Henry J. Wood's Prom Concerts in Queen's Hall.

In September 1920, when he was singing the Steersman's Song, from Wagner's Der fliegende Holländer at a Prom Concert, he met the popular novelist and passionate Wagnerite Hugh Walpole and the two quickly became firm friends, travelling together and staying in each other's houses. On a visit to Walpole's cottage in Polperro Melchior "caused a sensation by singing at a concert in the village", and later on a visit to Helston he and Walpole both took part in the Floral Dance. In December 1921 on a visit with Walpole to his (Walpole's) parents in Edinburgh, Melchior gave a concert in the Usher Hall. Walpole provided the fledgling Heldentenor with financial aid in February 1922, paying in advance two-thirds of the fees for his studies under Victor Beigel. In 1923, Walpole gave Melchior a further £800, enabling him to continue his studies with Ernst Grenzebach and the legendary dramatic soprano of the Vienna Court Opera, Anna Bahr von Mildenburg.

=== As a leading Heldentenor ===
Word of his talent spread and was heard of by Cosima and Siegfried Wagner at Bayreuth. There the re-opening of the Festival for 1924 was under preparation. Melchior was engaged to sing Siegmund and Parsifal. This prestigious contract opened the way to several other appearances such as a Wagner concert with Frida Leider in Berlin in 1923. Around this time several acoustic records were cut for Polydor.

On May 14, 1924, Lauritz Melchior made his debut, as Siegmund, at the Royal Opera House at Covent Garden in London. The result was a smashing success. Some weeks later Melchior made his debut on the stage of the Festspielhaus in Bayreuth in the roles of Siegmund and Parsifal. In July 1925 Adolf Hitler attended a performance of Parsifal in Bayreuth as a guest of Winifred Wagner. According to Walpole, who was sitting in Wagner's box next to Hitler, as Melchior sang, "the tears poured down Hitler's cheeks". On February 17, 1926, his first appearance at the Metropolitan Opera in New York City took place. He sang Tannhäuser opposite Maria Jeritza, Friedrich Schorr, Karin Branzell, and Michael Bohnen with Artur Bodanzky conducting. Although he was not adversely criticized, there was not much enthusiasm elicited by this debut. In his first season at the Metropolitan opera, Melchior sang only eight times. His second season brought only one appearance. To build up his repertory and gain more stage experience, he accepted an engagement at the Hamburg State Opera, where he appeared as Lohengrin, Otello, Radames in Aida and Jean van Leyden in Le prophète. He also sang regularly at other major German music theaters, like the State Operas of Berlin and Munich.

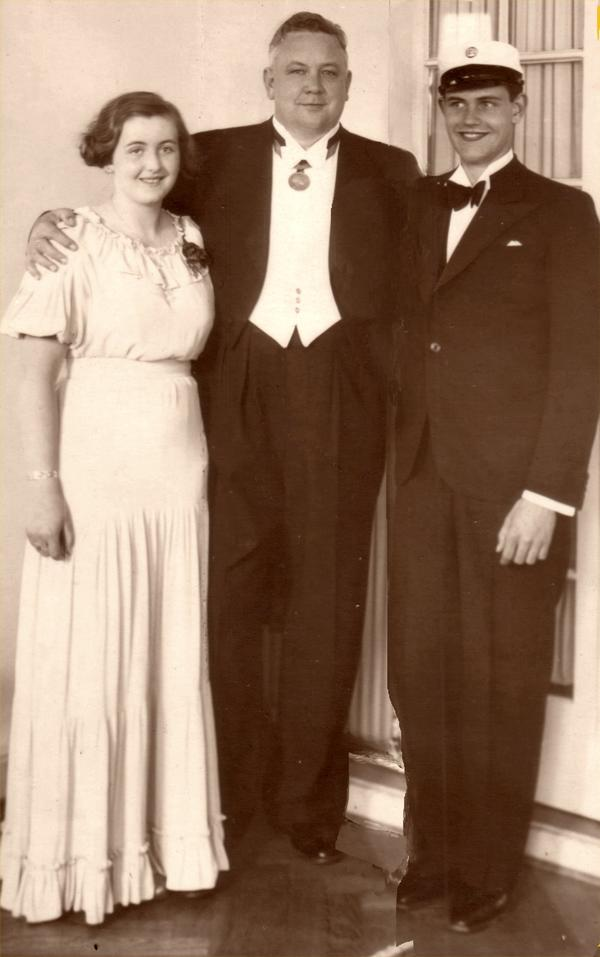
Melchior with his children

Although Melchior sang at most of the theatres and concert halls of the Western world during his long career, he is perhaps best remembered as a member of the Metropolitan Opera company, where he sang 519 performances of Wagnerian roles between 1926 and 1950. Melchior's breakthrough at the Metropolitan Opera finally came when he performed in Tristan und Isolde on March 20, 1929. From this point on, his career flourished.

Melchior appeared at Covent Garden from 1924 to 1939, also as Otello (opposite Viorica Ursuleac as Desdemona) and Florestan, besides the Wagnerian repertory. Also at Covent Garden in 1932, he sang opposite popular soprano Florence Easton in Siegfried, the only time they appeared together. Other important stations of his career were in the Buenos Aires (Teatro Colón) (1931–1943), San Francisco Opera (1934–1945) and Chicago Opera (1934–1945). It was Lohengrin's Farewell that served as Melchior's "swan song" in his last stage performance, on February 2, 1950.

Some of Melchior's most notable colleagues in the opera houses of the world included the sopranos Frida Leider, Kirsten Flagstad, Lotte Lehmann, Helen Traubel, Marjorie Lawrence, and Elisabeth Rethberg, and conductors Felix Weingartner, Bruno Walter, Wilhelm Furtwängler, Fritz Reiner, Sir Thomas Beecham, Arturo Toscanini, Erich Leinsdorf, George Szell, and Otto Klemperer.

He played contract bridge, and holds the world record for the lowest score (13%) secured in a duplicate bridge tournament.

=== Moving in new directions ===
Between 1944 and 1952, Melchior performed in five Hollywood musical films for Metro-Goldwyn-Mayer and Paramount Pictures and made numerous US radio and television appearances. In 1947, he put his hand and footprints in cement in the forecourt of Grauman's Chinese Theatre in Hollywood.

From 1946 to 1949, Melchior went on a world tour with his personal conductor Ezra Rachlin. Their visit to Denmark was particularly meaningful as they were the guests of King Frederik IX, who was an amateur conductor with his own personal concert hall in his palace.

In 1952, Melchior performed at New York's Palace Theatre, following the popular singer-actress Judy Garland, after she set a record-breaking vaudeville engagement there which lasted nineteen weeks.

Following unofficial retirement circa 1955, Melchior made sporadic singing appearances. On occasion, he sang the national anthem at Dodgers baseball games in Los Angeles, such as Game 3 of the 1963 World Series. In the late 1960s, he established a fund through the Juilliard School for the training of potential heldentenors called "The Lauritz Melchior Heldentenor Foundation."

In 1959, he made at least one television appearance on The Danny Thomas Show, where he sang with Shirley Jones in the role of her father, to assist her entry into show business.

In the summer of 1972, Melchior conducted the San Francisco Opera Orchestra at Sigmund Stern Grove in the Radetzky March by Johann Strauss I as part of the 50th anniversary celebration of the company. This was one of his last public appearances.

=== Victim of robbery ===
On June 18, 1957, three men (Richard McFall, Wayne Burke and Alfred J. Pope) forcibly entered Melchior's Los Angeles home and tied/bound four victims (Melchior, his wife and two servants) before fleeing with an estimated value of $100,000 in cash, jewels, furs and other personal property. The three robbers were told of the valuables by a former Melchior chauffeur, Louis J. Spivak, who was to receive a 1/3 share of the booty.

=== Death ===
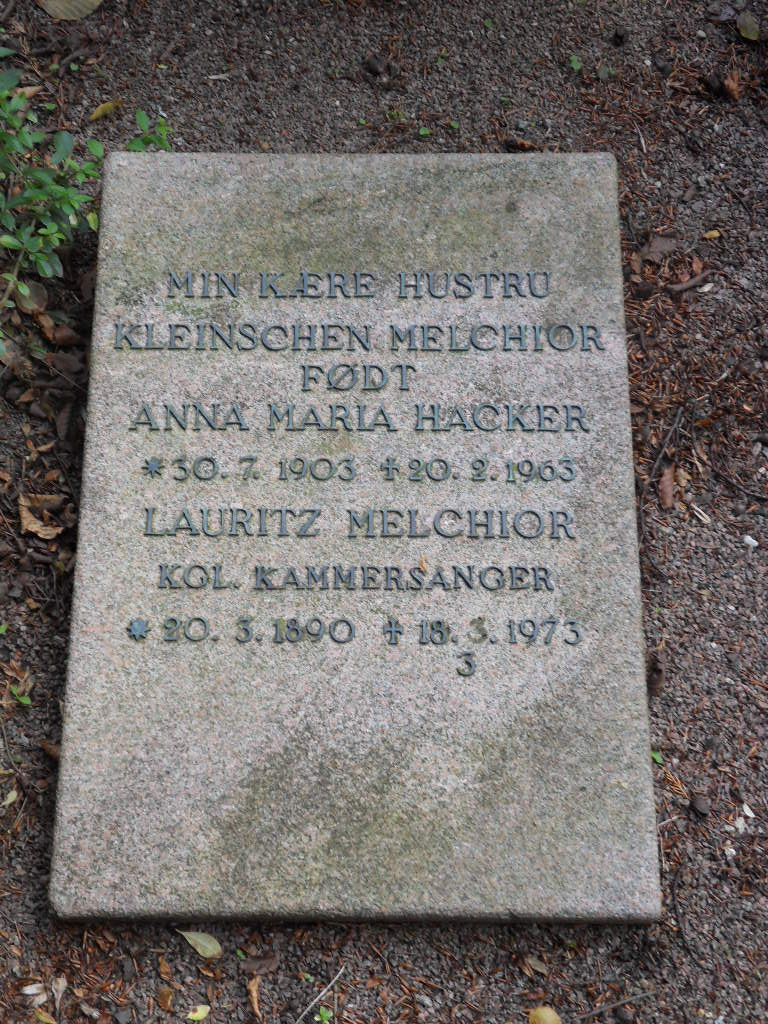
Melchior's tombstone

An American citizen since 1947, Melchior died in Santa Monica, California, in 1973, two days before his 83rd birthday. He was put to rest in the Assistens Kirkegaard cemetery in Copenhagen. He was survived by his son, Danish-American novelist and filmmaker Ib Melchior, who wrote a biography of his father and for years fought a legal battle to reclaim the Melchior family estate Chossewitz in Germany, which was confiscated by East Germany.

== Recordings ==
Melchior made many recordings, first as a baritone on His Master's Voice, then as a tenor for Deutsche Grammophon (Polydor) (1923–1930), His Master's Voice (1927–1935), RCA Victor (1938–1941), American Columbia (1942–1950) and lastly Warner Bros. His final appearance with Danish radio was in 1960 with a performance of the first act of Die Walküre to celebrate his 70th birthday, which was released as a recording.

== Filmography ==
Year	Title	Role	Notes
1945	Thrill of a Romance	Mr. Nils Knudsen	
1946	Two Sisters from Boston	Olstrom	
1947	This Time for Keeps	Richard Herald	
1948	Luxury Liner	Olaf Eriksen	
1953	The Stars Are Singing	Jan Poldi	

== Bibliography ==
- Emmons, Shirley: Tristanissimo: The Authorized Biography of Heroic Tenor Lauritz Melchior (New York, Schirmer Books, 1990) (Includes an updated version of Hans Hansen's 1972 discography of commercial & "live" recordings.)
- Melchior, Ib: Lauritz Melchior: The Golden Years of Bayreuth (Fort Worth, TX, Baskerville Publishers, 2003)
