= Vilhelm Herold =

Danish opera singer (1865–1937)

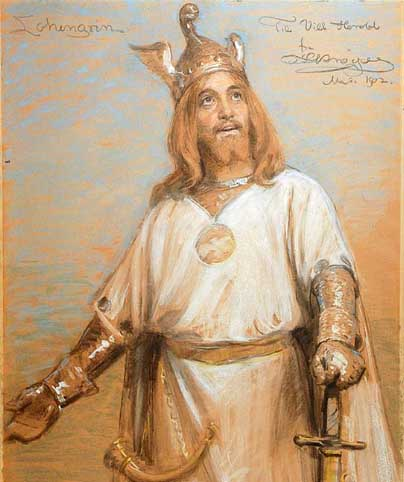
Vilhelm Herold as Lohengrin, 1907

Vilhelm Christoffer Herold (born March 19, 1865 – December 15, 1937) was an operatic tenor, voice teacher, and theatre director. Herold created the role of David in Carl Nielsen's opera Saul og David in 1902).

== Career ==
Herold was born in Hasle, Bornholm. He made his stage debut on February 10, 1893, in the title role of Gounod's Faust at the Royal Theatre in Copenhagen. However, he also sang throughout Europe, including a command performance for King Edward VII at Buckingham Palace in 1905. The previous year, he had made his Covent Garden debut in the title role of Lohengrin. He also sang at the 1893 World's Fair in Chicago.

Herold was a prominent interpreter of Pedro in Eugen d'Albert's Tiefland during the years following its premiere, with the composer himself pronouncing him as ideal in the role. ("Sie sind das Ideal eines Pedro.") He also sang Pedro in the 1913 Oslo performance of Tiefland which marked Kirsten Flagstad's stage debut. It was in Tiefland that Herold made his final appearance on the opera stage on March 19, 1915, his 50th birthday. However, he has left no recordings from this work.

Upon his retirement from the stage, Herold worked primarily as a voice and drama teacher at the Royal Theatre in Copenhagen, where he trained a generation of Danish singers, including Lauritz Melchior. From 1922 to 1924 he was also a director at the Royal Theatre, where he staged Louise and Boris Godunov. He died in Copenhagen.

Herold's published discography numbers 135 titles. Extracts from some of those titles have been transferred from records in the collection of Denmark's State and University Library to the Nimbus CD Prima Voce: Vilhelm Herold (NI7880).

== Sculptor ==
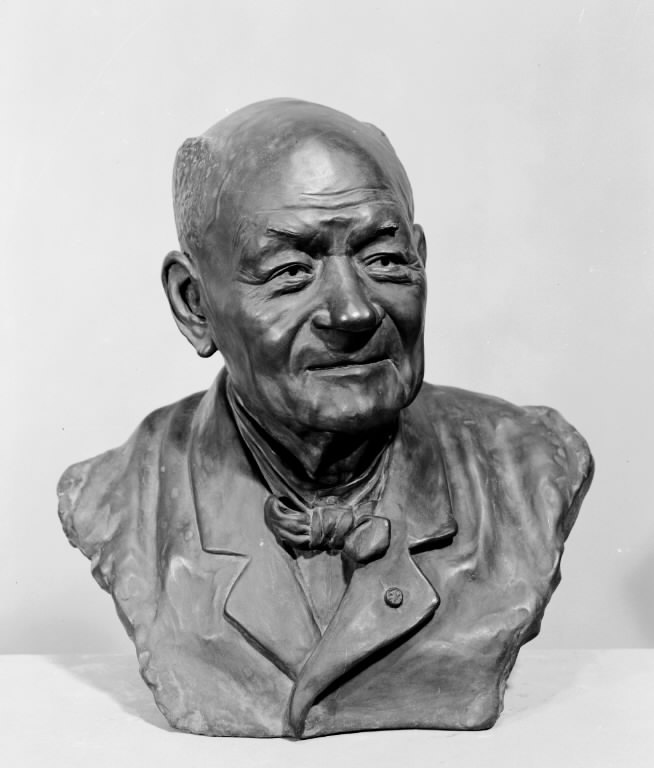
Herold's bust of Otto Zinck, 1905.

Herold was also active as a sculptor. He mainly created portrait busts of friends and family. His first work, a bust of actor Otto Zinck, was acquired by the Danish National Gallery.

== Notes and references ==
- Carl Nielsen Society Accessed 28 April 2007.
- Hein, M., 1996, Liner notes for Prima Voce: Vilhelm Herold, Nimbus Records NI7880. Archived from the original on 11 August 2007.
- Herold's grave in the Hasle Kirke cemetery Accessed 29 April 2007.
- Rosenthal, H. and Warrack, J., 1979, The Concise Oxford Dictionary of Opera, 2nd Edition, Oxford University Press p. 227
