= Betty Wand =

American singer 1923–2003

Betty Ruth Wand (August 10, 1923 – September 12, 2003) was an American singer and author, best known as the singing voice dubbed in for various actresses in musical films, including Leslie Caron in Gigi and some of Rita Moreno's part in West Side Story. In 1990, she wrote Secrets for Women in Their Prime, an advice book for older women on fashion, nutrition, and travel.

Wand was born in Venice, California. She began her career in the 1940s during the Big Band era, singing with the orchestras of Xavier Cugat, Horace Heidt, and Ray Conniff.

In the 1950s, she invented and patented a baby bottle holder.

Wand married Aulden Schlatter, with whom she had two sons. Schlatter died in July 2004, ten months after Wand.

== See also ==
- Ghost singer
