= Easy to Love (1953 film) =

1953 Esther Williams film directed by Charles Walters

- Directed by: Charles Walters
- Screenplay by: Laszlo Vadnay; William Roberts
- Story by: Laszlo Vadnay
- Produced by: Joe Pasternak
- Starring: Esther Williams; Van Johnson; Tony Martin
- Cinematography: Ray June
- Edited by: Gene Ruggiero
- Music by: Lennie Hayton; George Stoll; Robert Van Eps
- Distributed by: Metro-Goldwyn-Mayer
- Release date: December 25, 1953
- Running time: 96 minutes
- Country: United States
- Language: English
- Budget: $1,831,000
- Box office: $3,789,000

Easy to Love is a 1953 Technicolor musical film directed by Charles Walters with choreography by Busby Berkeley. It stars Esther Williams, Van Johnson and Tony Martin. It was Williams' final aquatic film set in the United States.

== Plot ==
Ray Lloyd runs a successful Cypress Gardens water show, but star attraction Julie Hallerton is overworked and unappreciated by Ray who doesn't know she is in love with him. She fibs about pretending to marry her aquatic partner Hank (John Bromfield) to try make Ray jealous but is persuaded by Ray to accompany him to New York instead.

Julie is hired to pose for a magazine lipstick ad, when handsome singer Barry Gordon takes the place of a male model and kisses her instead. Barry offers to introduce Julie to a promoter who agrees to hire her for a New York water show he produces. Moreover, he will pay her more and treat her better than does Ray.

When they return to Florida, a jealous Hank tells off Ray for not realizing how Julie truly feels about him. Her roommate Nancy whacks her accidentally with a water ski, knocking Julie cold. All three men in her life rush to her side.

By the end, Ray finally realizes he is in love with Julie and they embrace and kiss. Barry quickly turns his attention to another bathing beauty while Nancy reveals a romantic interest in Hank.

== Cast ==
- Esther Williams as Julie Hallerton
- Van Johnson as Ray Lloyd
- Tony Martin as Barry Gordon
- John Bromfield as Hank
- Edna Skinner as Nancy Parmel
- Carroll Baker as Clarice
- Hal Borne as Melvin, the pianist
- Emory Parnell as Mr. Huffnagel

Cast notes:

- This was Carroll Baker's film debut.
- Hal Bourne is billed as "Hal Berns".

== Songs ==
- "Didja Ever" — music by Vic Mizzy, lyrics by Mann Curtis. Sung by Tony Martin.
- "Look Out! I'm Romantic" — music by Vic Mizzy, lyrics by Mann Curtis. Sung by Tony Martin.
- "Coquette" — music by Carmen Lombardo and Johnny Green, lyrics by Gus Kahn. Sung by Tony Martin.
- "You'd Be So Easy to Love" — music and lyrics Cole Porter, sung by Tony Martin.
- "That's What a Rainy Day Is For" — music by Vic Mizzy, lyrics by Mann Curtis. Performed by Tony Martin and Esther Williams (dubbed by Betty Wand).
- "What Good Is a Gal? (Without a Guy)" — music by Harry Warren.

Other songs

- "Tritsch Tratsch Polka, Op. 214" — music by Johann Strauss II.
- "Roses from the South" — music by Johann Strauss II.
- "Spring, Beautiful Spring"

== Production ==
MGM announced the film in October 1952. It was shot partly on location in Cypress Gardens starting 12 February 1953.

Carroll Baker made her film debut in a small role as a once-married woman interested in Tony Martin's character, and jealous of Esther Williams.

Tony Martin's wife Cyd Charisse visited the set during filming and appears in a cameo at the end of the film.

== Reception ==
According to MGM records the film made $2,349,000 in the US and Canada and $1,440,000 elsewhere resulting in a profit of $385,000.
