= Ben Gage =

American radio singer and announcer (1914–1978)

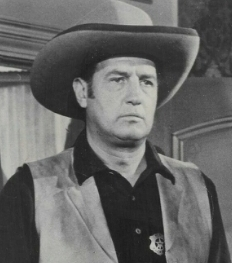
- Gage in Maverick, 1959
- Born: Benjamin Austin Gage; October 23, 1914; Chicago, Illinois, U.S.
- Died: April 28, 1978 (aged 63); Los Angeles, California, U.S.
- Occupations: Radio singer; announcer; actor
- Years active: 1937–1975
- Television: Maverick, Star Trek
- Height: 6 ft 6 in (1.98 m)
- Spouses: Esther Williams (m. 1945; div. 1958) Anne Martin Arnold (m. 1969)
- Children: 3

Benjamin Austin Gage (October 29, 1914 – April 28, 1978) was an American radio singer and announcer, occasional off-screen film singer dubbing the voice of non-singing actors, and television actor active from 1937 to 1975. Born in Chicago, Illinois, his first wife was Esther Williams.

== Early career ==
Gage joined NBC's Hollywood announcing staff in 1937. Later that year, he became the announcer for the Olsen and Johnson radio program. On May 20, 1940, Blue Network Varieties was launched on the NBC Pacific Blue network. Gage was the singing announcer of the five-day-a-week half-hour program. That same year, he and Mary Jane Barnes were "featured singers" on Remember This Song?, a weekly program also on NBC Pacific Blue. In September 1941, he joined the Bob Hope Show, replacing Bill Goodwin as announcer.

During World War II, Gage was a sergeant in the U.S. Army Air Force. He worked with the USAAF's band on Soldiers With Wings on CBS radio.

== Postwar and television ==
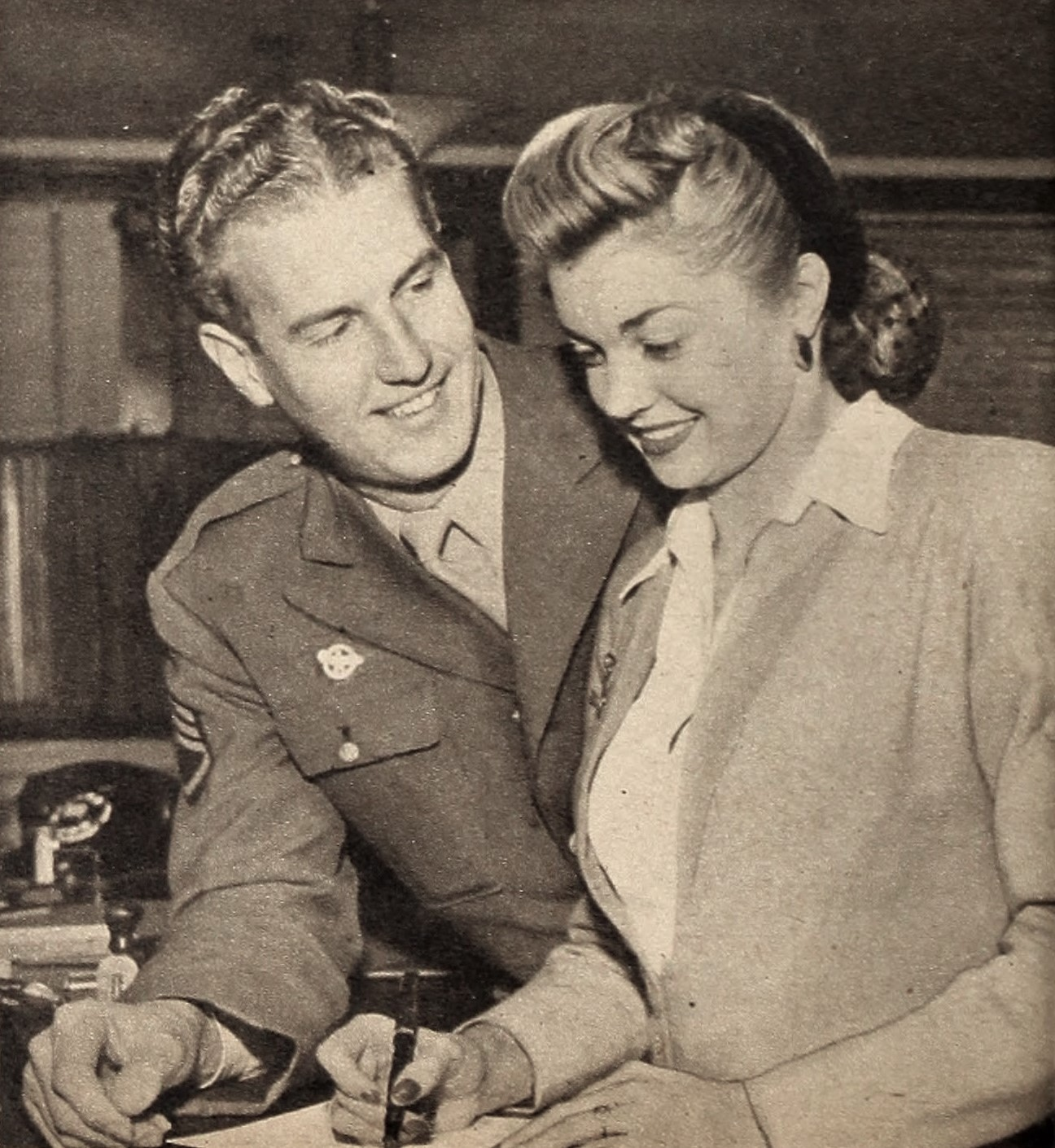
Sgt. Ben Gage and Esther Williams in 1946

He served as announcer and vocalist for Maxwell House Coffee Time, a musical summer replacement program in 1946. In 1947, he was a regular on Meredith Willson's Ford Showroom, serving as singer and announcer. He also played Dr. Crenshaw on The Joan Davis Show. In 1948, he was the announcer for the Danny Thomas Show.

Gage resembled James Arness and could imitate his voice perfectly, and played Gunsmoke spoofs in four episodes of the Maverick television series, which is the work for which he is best remembered, especially for a 1959 Maverick episode with James Garner called "Gun-Shy" (with Gage as "Marshal Mort Dooley" instead of "Marshal Matt Dillon") as well as "A Tale of Three Cities" with Jack Kelly, "The Misfortune Teller" with Garner, and "A Technical Error" with Kelly.

He also appeared on Batman, Bonanza, F Troop, The Donna Reed Show, The Lucy Show, and Star Trek.

== Personal life ==
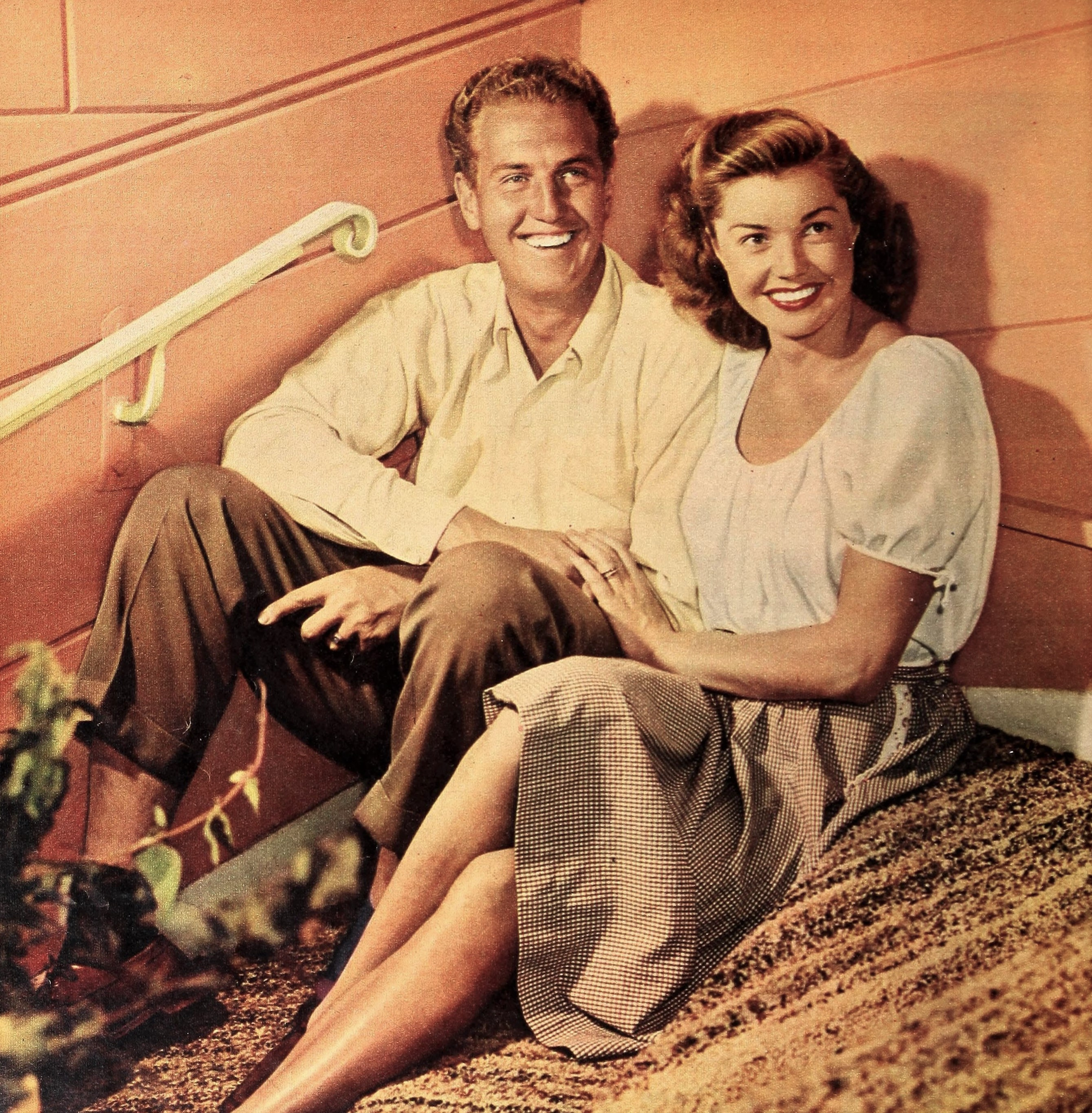
Ben Gage and Esther Williams in 1950.

Gage married swimmer/actress Esther Williams on November 25, 1945. They divorced April 8, 1958, and they had three children: Benjamin, Kimball (1950-2008), and Susan. Gage and Williams made a personal appearance tour September 10 - October 13, 1954. For Sentimental Reasons, the couple's album, was released by MGM Records in November 1954.

Gage later married Anne Martin Arnold in Beverly Hills, CA, on April 6, 1969, and they remained together until Ben's death. The couple did not have any children. Ann Gage was born Anne Martin on January 24, 1934, in Seattle, Washington, and died on March 24, 2021, in Yucaipa, California.

Ben Gage died on April 28, 1978; he was 63 years old.

== Partial filmography ==
- The Big Operator (1959)

== See also ==
- List of Maverick episodes
