= Pagan Love Song =

1950 film by Robert Alton

- Original film poster
- Directed by: Robert Alton
- Written by: Robert Nathan; Jerry Davis
- Based on: novel Tahiti Landfall by William S. Stone
- Produced by: Arthur Freed
- Starring: Esther Williams; Howard Keel
- Cinematography: Charles Rosher
- Edited by: Adrienne Fazan
- Music by: Harry Warren; Nacio Herb Brown; Arthur Freed; conducted by Adolph Deutsch
- Color process: Technicolor
- Production company: Metro-Goldwyn-Mayer
- Distributed by: Loew's, Inc.
- Release dates: December 25, 1950 (New York City); December 29, 1950 (U.S.)
- Running time: 76 minutes
- Country: United States
- Language: English
- Budget: $1,920,000
- Box office: $3,360,000

Pagan Love Song is a 1950 American romantic musical film released by MGM and starring Esther Williams and Howard Keel. Set in Tahiti, it was based on the novel Tahiti Landfall by William S. Stone.

It was the first major role for Rita Moreno (then 19) and her third film overall.

== Plot ==
Mimi Bennett lives with her wealthy aunt Kate on the Polynesian isle of Tahiti. A half-Tahitian, half-American, Mimi's dream is to someday leave the South Pacific to live in America.

Hazard Endicott's arrival changes her plans. He is a schoolteacher from Ohio who has inherited a Tahitian estate, Plantation Oni-ani. He hires a housekeeper and, mistaking Mimi for an island local, offers her the job. She amuses herself by feigning a bare grasp of English.

The estate turns out to be little more than a shack. Endicott also underestimates an invitation to a party at Kate's, arriving in casual island attire to an event with elegantly dressed guests. Mimi takes pity on him, and a romance blooms.

== Cast ==
- Esther Williams as Mimi Bennett (singing voice was dubbed by Betty Wand)
- Howard Keel as Hazard Endicott
- Minna Gombell as Kate
- Charles Mauu as Tavae
- Rita Moreno as Terru
- Bill Kaliloa as Mata (uncredited)

== Production ==
The film was originally announced as Tahiti and was to star Ann Miller, Howard Keel, and Ricardo Montalbán. Eventually Miller was replaced by Esther Williams and Montalbán by Charles Mauu. The title was then changed to Hawaii.

The film was to be directed by Stanley Donen, but Williams refused to work with him after her unpleasant experience filming the previous year's Take Me Out to the Ball Game. Location shooting took place on the Hawaiian island of Kauai.

Williams realized that she was pregnant while making the film. She claimed that she nearly drowned during filming.

The film exceeded its budget by $400,000 ($5,592,370 in a 2026).

== Reception ==
In a contemporary review, Thomas M. Pryor of The New York Times praised the scenery and Williams' "aquatic exercises" but panned the film overall: "Presumably there is a story somewhere in the picture, but all we can recollect is a series of incidents, some eye-filling and some amusing, others rather pointless and tedious. Perhaps life on the island is just too idyllic."

According to MGM records, the film earned $2,157,000 in the U.S. and Canada and $1,203,000 elsewhere, resulting in a profit of $108,000. This was considered a relative disappointment for an Esther Williams film.
