= Million Dollar Mermaid =

1952 American biographical musical drama film by Mervyn LeRoy

- Theatrical release poster
- Directed by: Mervyn LeRoy
- Written by: Everett Freeman
- Produced by: Arthur Hornblow Jr.
- Starring: Esther Williams; Victor Mature; Walter Pidgeon
- Cinematography: George J. Folsey
- Edited by: John McSweeney, Jr.
- Music by: Alexander Courage (orchestrator); Adolph Deutsch (conductor & music score)
- Production company: Metro-Goldwyn-Mayer
- Distributed by: Loew's Inc.
- Release date: December 4, 1952
- Running time: 115 minutes
- Country: United States
- Language: English
- Budget: $2,642,000
- Box office: $4,947,000

Million Dollar Mermaid (also known as The One Piece Bathing Suit in the UK) is a 1952 American biographical musical drama film directed by Mervyn LeRoy, produced by Arthur Hornblow Jr. and starring Esther Williams, Victor Mature, Walter Pidgeon and David Brian. The plot concerns the life of Australian swimming star Annette Kellerman.

== Plot ==
In the late 19th century, polio-stricken Australian girl Annette Kellerman swims to improve her health. Her father Frederick, who owns a music conservatory, accepts a teaching position in England. Aboard ship, Annette encounters the American promoter James Sullivan and his associate Doc Cronnol, who are taking a boxing kangaroo named Sydney to London.

In London, Jimmy suggests promoting Annette in a six-mile swim to Greenwich, but she volunteers to extend it to 26 miles. Word spreads of the swim and Annette's feat is newsworthy. Jimmy believes that they can make a fortune if Annette performs in a water ballet at the Hippodrome in New York. However, show manager Alfred Harper does not offer Annette a role in the show, so she travels to Boston for a highly publicized swim. However, she courts trouble by wearing a revealing one-piece swimsuit.

Annette and Jimmy have a misunderstanding and part ways. Harper has a change of heart and offers to make Annette the headliner of his New York show. After the death of her father, she travels to Montauk at the behest of Doc to try to dissuade Jimmy from flying in an air race with a $50,000 prize.

Harper falls in love with Annette while she travels to Hollywood to appear in a film. Jimmy and Doc arrive, promoting a dog named Rin Tin Tin that they hope will star in the movies. A water tank bursts during the production of Annette's film, causing her a spinal hematoma. With Annette's future in doubt, Harper steps aside when he sees that Annette and Jimmy are in love.

== Cast ==
- Esther Williams as Annette Kellerman
- Victor Mature as James Sullivan
- Walter Pidgeon as Frederick Kellerman
- David Brian as Alfred Harper
- Donna Corcoran as Annette Kellerman (Age 10)
- Jesse White as Doc Cronnol
- Maria Tallchief as Anna Pavlova
- Howard Freeman as Aldrich
- Charles Watts as Policeman
- Wilton Graff as Garvey
- Frank Ferguson as Boston Prosecutor
- James Bell as Boston Judge
- James Flavin as Train Conductor
- Willis Bouchey as Movie Director
- Gordon Richards as Casey

== Production ==
In 1947, it was reported that Esther Williams wanted MGM to acquire the rights to Annette Kellerman's life story as a vehicle for her. Virginia Mayo also expressed interest in playing Kellerman on screen. Kellerman was unhappy that MGM had greatly changed her 1914 film Neptune's Daughter when the studio remade it as a 1949 film starring Williams, and she was unwilling to allow her life story to be told in a film. However, Kellerman changed her mind when she met Williams and liked her. Williams brought Kellerman to meet MGM executives and pitched the project to them. In February 1951, MGM announced the project, originally titled The One Piece Suit. Arthur Hornblow Jr. was assigned to produce.

The film's screenplay was written by Everett Freeman. Adolph Deutsch conducted the music, George Folsey was the cinematographer and Busby Berkeley was the choreographer, with Audrene Briere responsible for the underwater choreography.

Louis Calhern was set to play Kellerman's father before the role was assigned to Walter Pidgeon. Kellerman had hoped that Glenn Ford would play her husband, but the role went to Victor Mature.

Williams broke her neck upon impact while performing the film's signature high dive. She wrote in her memoir that she was disoriented atop the platform after having endured seven broken eardrums from her years working underwater. When she dove, she felt that the headdress of her costume was too heavy and that she was in danger. She heard her neck pop when she hit the water. When she reached the surface, she could kick her legs, but her upper body was paralyzed and she required assistance to leave the pool. An X-ray revealed that she had suffered three broken vertebrae. Williams later wrote: "I'd come as close to snapping my spinal cord and becoming a paraplegic as you could without actually succeeding.”

== Release ==
The film opened at Radio City Music Hall in New York on December 4, 1952. During its fourth week, it grossed $184,000, a record for a film at a single theater.

According to MGM records, the film earned $2,851,000 in the US and Canada and $2,096,000 elsewhere resulting in a profit of $243,000.

== Reception ==
In a contemporary review for The New York Times, critic Bosley Crowther wrote: "Like the stage show, this Technicolored shindig, which laughingly pretends to be a biography of the famous swimmer Annette Kellerman, is a luxuriance of razzle-dazzle that includes Hippodrome acts, water ballets, bathing suit shows, diving performances, low comedy, anachronisms and clichés. It also includes an abundance of Miss Williams and Victor Mature, but it does not include the felicities of a reasonably fascinating script. This is a notable omission, for there are long stretches in this gaudy film when the forward (or any) movement of it is dependent upon the script. ... However, it is quite a splashy production that Metro has arranged to show off its elegant Miss Williams in a variety of one-piece bathing suits."

== Awards ==
George Folsey received a 1953 Academy Award nomination for Best Cinematography, Color.

== Legacy ==
Esther Williams titled her 1999 autobiography Million Dollar Mermaid and has often named it as her favorite film.

After the film was released, it was that reported Mervyn LeRoy had met with Kellerman to discuss a sequel that would cover her career as a film star and her wartime work for the Red Cross. However, the project did not materialize.

== Home media ==
The film was released in VHS format by MGM in 1989. In 2009, Turner Classic Movies, via Turner Entertainment, released Million Dollar Mermaid on DVD as part of the Esther Williams Spotlight Collection, Volume 2. The film was released as a standalone DVD in 2018 by Warner Archive Collection and on Blu-ray disc in 2020.
