= Deaths in October 1980 =

The following is a list of notable deaths in October 1980.

Entries for each day are listed alphabetically by surname. A typical entry lists information in the following sequence:

- Name, age, country of citizenship at birth, subsequent country of citizenship (if applicable), reason for notability, cause of death (if known), and reference.

== October 1980 ==
=== 1 ===
- István Angyal, 65, Hungarian Olympic swimmer (1936).
- Dorothy Blum, 56, American computer scientist, cancer.
- Harry Grey, 78, Russian-born American writer and mobster.
- Patrick E. Haggerty, 66, American engineer and businessman (Texas Instruments).
- Charles Harbidge, 89, English footballer.
- Edward Vason Jones, 71, American architect.
- M. B. Mather, 81, British flying ace.
- Derek Mills-Roberts, 71, British soldier.
- Bud Schwenk, 63, American football player, lung cancer.
- Pedro Suinaga, 73, Mexican footballer.
- Pat Veltman, 74, American baseball player.

=== 2 ===
- Bahman Akhundov, 69, Soviet Azerbaijani economist.
- Jakob Aleksič, 83, Slovenian theologian.
- Princess Alexandrine of Prussia, 65, German royal.
- R. E. Cooper Sr., 67, Bahamian Baptist minister.
- Louis Daquin, 72, French filmmaker and actor.
- Douglas Dold, 84, South African cricketer.
- Carlos García-Bedoya Zapata, 54, Peruvian diplomat.
- Eric Hass, 75, American politician, heart attack.
- J. David Jones, 68, American politician.
- Sir John Kotelawala, 83, Sri Lankan politician, prime minister (1953–1956), stroke.
- Adrian Lindsey, 85, American football player and coach.
- Anders K. Orvin, 90, Norwegian geologist and explorer.
- Lina Pagliughi, 73, American-born Italian opera singer.
- Pietro Pastorino, 79, Italian Olympic sprinter (1924).
- Yorick Smythies, 63, English philosopher.
- Arturs Sproģis, 76, Latvian soldier.
- Filipp Starikov, 83, Soviet general.
- Mel Stuessy, 79, American football player.
- Joseph F. Timilty, 85, American police officer and politician.
- Valentin Varlamov, 46, Soviet jet pilot and cosmonaut candidate.

=== 3 ===
- Sir Conrad Corfield, 87, British civil servant and writer.
- Friedrich Karm, 73, Estonian footballer.
- Flemmie Pansy Kittrell, 75, American nutritionist and economist, cardiac arrest.
- María Teresa Mora, 77, Cuban chess player.
- F. Kenneth Milne, 95, Australian architect.
- E. J. C. Neep, 79, British barrister and politician.
- Douglas Nixon, 82, New Zealand cricketer.
- Albéric O'Kelly de Galway, 69, Belgian chess player.
- Freddie Roach, 49, American organist, heart attack.
- Armand Swartenbroeks, 88, Belgian footballer.
- Melvin E. Thompson, 77, American politician, governor of Georgia (1947–1948).
- E. J. Vass, 74–75, Singaporean badminton player, heart attack.
- Gustav Wagner, 69, Austrian Nazi commander and war criminal, suicide by stabbing.
- Jerzy Żurawlew, 93, Polish pianist, founder of the International Chopin Piano Competition.

=== 4 ===
- Charme Allen, 89, American actress.
- Petras Būtėnas, 84, Lithuanian linguist.
- Kenneth Churchill, 69, American Olympic javelin thrower (1932).
- Charles Eisenmann, 77, French jurist.
- Si Green, 47, American basketball player, lung cancer.
- Pyotr Masherov, 61, Soviet Belarusian politician, traffic collision.
- Lenny McBrowne, 47, American jazz drummer.
- S. K. Ojha, 58, Indian film director.
- Genevieve Pitot, 79, American pianist and composer.
- László Szollás, 72, Hungarian Olympic ice skater (1932, 1936).
- Salah el-Dine Tarazi, 62, Syrian diplomat and lawyer, traffic collision.

=== 5 ===
- Jack Baker, 66, American magician and film producer, heart attack.
- Sir Geoffrey Hawkins, 85, British naval admiral.
- William Macgregor, 92, Australian cricketer and veterinarian.
- Urinboy Rakhmonov, 70, Soviet Kyrgyz actor and theatre director.
- Richard S. Reynolds Jr., 72, American businessman.
- Wilhelm Schmid, 59, Austrian ice hockey player.
- Tobin Sorenson, 25, American rock climber, fall.
- John Sutcliffe, 67, English footballer.
- Xu Xu, 71, Chinese novelist.

=== 6 ===
- Sir Edric Bastyan, 77, British-Australian general and politician.
- Lincoln Chase, 54, American songwriter ("The Name Game").
- Maurie Fleming, 77–78, Australian football executive.
- Leslie Grange, 86, New Zealand soil scientist and geologist.
- Hattie Jacques, 58, English actress (Carry On, Sykes), heart attack.
- Miriam Laufer, 61, American artist, stroke.
- Louis Martin-Chauffier, 86, French journalist.
- Denys Morkel, 74, South African cricketer.
- Thomas A. Mutch, 49, American geologist, planetary scientist and mountain climber.
- Robert Don Oliver, 85, British naval admiral.
- Ferenc Pelvássy, 69, Hungarian Olympic cyclist (1936).
- Jean Robic, 59, French racing cyclist, traffic collision.
- Isobel Schenk, 82, Australian missionary.
- Felix Slavik, 68, Austrian politician, mayor of Vienna (1970–1973).
- Shigemaru Takenokoshi, 74, Japanese football player and manager, stroke.
- Wilburn Tucker, 60, American football and baseball player and coach.
- Ray Walker, 76, American actor.

=== 7 ===
- Ernst Alm, 80, Swedish Olympic skier (1924).
- Jan Cox, 61, Dutch-Belgian painter, suicide.
- Robert Brocklesby Davis, 68, British-American psychiatrist, coronary thrombosis.
- Carl Frederick Falkenberg, 83, Canadian flying ace.
- Bruce Alva Gimbel, 67, American businessman (Gimbels), heart attack.
- Rostam Giv, 91–92, Iranian politician and philanthropist.
- Araksia Gyulzadyan, 73, Armenian folk musician.
- Zigmas Jukna, 45, Lithuanian Olympic rower (1960, 1964, 1968), brain cancer.
- Jim Lewis, 71, Welsh footballer.
- Sir Gordon Russell, 88, English furniture designer.
- Santiago Urcelay, 65, Chilean politician.
- Randy Wood, 50, American record company executive (Vee-Jay Records).

=== 8 ===
- David I. Arkin, 73, American songwriter ("Black and White") and painter, cancer.
- Suzanne Bertillon, 89, French World War II resistance member.
- John Dollard, 80, American psychologist and social scientist.
- George Selwyn English, 68, Australian composer, cancer.
- Gordon R. Fisher, 85, American college sports coach.
- Lloyd Johnson, 69, American baseball player.
- Jimmy Joyce, 73, Australian footballer.
- Pearl Kendrick, 90, American bacteriologist, co-developer of the whooping cough vaccine, cancer.
- George Levis, 85, American basketball player and coach.
- John Logan, 68, English footballer.
- Maurice Martenot, 81, French cellist and musician, inventor of the ondes Martenot.
- Frank Vigor Morley, 81, American mathematician and publishing executive, complications from surgery.
- Donald Scott, 85, American Olympic runner (1920, 1924).
- Arvo Turtiainen, 76, Finnish writer and translator.
- Meier Tzelniker, 86, Romanian-British actor.

=== 9 ===
- Julia Averkieva, 73, Soviet anthropologist.
- Leo Glans, 69, Surinamese painter.
- Carlisle W. Higgins, 90, American jurist and politician, member of the North Carolina House of Representatives (1925–1926) and Senate (1929–1930).
- Theophil Henry Hildebrandt, 92, American mathematician.
- Adam Henry Robson, 88, British RAF officer and educator.
- Filippo Scelzo, 80, Italian actor.
- Hinrich Warrelmann, 76, German general.
- Emily Hood Westacott, 70, Australian tennis player.

=== 10 ===
- Carlo Annovazzi, 55, Italian footballer.
- Bill Brown, 66, Australian footballer.
- Francis Carroll, 68, Northern Irish Roman Catholic prelate.
- Sheldon Warren Cheney, 94, American author and art critic, stroke.
- Bridgetta Clark, 89, American actress.
- Clarrie Clowe, 87, Australian footballer.
- Gordon Crisp, 70, Australian footballer.
- Evelyn Emmet, Baroness Emmet of Amberley, 81, British politician, MP (1955–1965).
- Tameichi Hara, 79, Japanese naval captain and writer.
- Sir Wilfred Hill-Wood, 79, English financier and cricketer.
- Walter Keeton, 75, English cricketer.
- Cyril Nott, 81, Australian footballer.
- Elizabeth Rummel, 83, German-Canadian environmentalist and mountaineer.
- Johan Simonsen, 63, Faroese politician.
- Billie "Buckwheat" Thomas, 49, American actor (Our Gang) and film editor, heart attack.
- Auguste Veuillet, 70, French racing driver and vehicle importer.
- Zhao Dan, 65, Chinese actor.

=== 11 ===
- Maxwell M. Geffen, 84, American publisher.
- Gracyn Wheeler Kelleher, 66, American tennis player.
- Stephen Kuffler, 67, Hungarian-American neuroscientist.
- Jim Moscrip, 67, American football player, heart attack.
- Marlene Oakes, 25, American murder victim, shot.
- Russo, 65, Brazilian footballer.
- Cassie Walmer, 92, British singer, dancer and comedian.

=== 12 ===
- Zenon Baranowski, 49, Polish Olympic sprinter (1956).
- Brita Bigum, 59, Norwegian actress.
- Alberto Demicheli, 84, Uruguayan politician, interim president (1976).
- Antoine Goléa, 74, French musicologist.
- Billy Kettle, 82, English footballer.
- Ambrosine Phillpotts, 68, British actress.
- Louis W. Staudenmaier, 74, American lawyer and politician.
- Zdzisław Stieber, 77, Polish linguist.

=== 13 ===
- Maurice Cacheux, 67, French racing cyclist.
- Derek Foster, 73, English cricketer.
- Donald F. Holmes, 70, American chemist and inventor.
- Dewey Luster, 81, American football player and coach.
- Joan Meredith, 73, American actress.
- Gabby Pahinui, 59, American guitarist, stroke.
- Seamus Quaid, 42, Irish police officer, shot.
- Steytler Thwaits, 69, South African cricketer.
- Annie Constance Tocker, 91, New Zealand minister, librarian and nurse.

=== 14 ===
- Jean-François Adam, 44, French actor and director, suicide by gunshot.
- Oscar Alemán, 71, Argentine jazz musician, stroke.
- Lawrence Baker, 90, American tennis player and administrator.
- Shute Banerjee, 69, Indian cricketer.
- Kibet Boit, 45–46, Kenyan Olympic sprinter (1956).
- Nicholas Llewelyn Davies, 72, British publisher.
- Louis Guilloux, 81, French writer.
- Clinton E. Knox, 72, American diplomat.
- Lester Leitl, 81, American football player and coach.
- Jack Moran, 73, American football player and coach.
- Mary O'Hara, 95, American author (My Friend Flicka), screenwriter and composer, arteriosclerosis.
- Arthur Pearson, 83, British politician, MP (1938–1970).
- Francesco Pricolo, 89, Italian aviator.

=== 15 ===
- Preston Anderson, 29, American football player.
- John Henry Balch, 84, American naval officer, Medal of Honor recipient.
- Katharine Mary Briggs, 81, British folklorist.
- Ronnie Bunting, 32, Irish Official IRA militant, shot.
- Tommy Croombs, 73, English motorcycle racer.
- Frederick Dobson, 82, English cricketer.
- Ladislas Farago, 74, Hungarian-American historian, cancer.
- Wilfrid Harrison, 71, Scottish academic.
- Mikhail Lavrentyev, 79, Soviet mathematician.
- Alexander Mach, 78, Slovak politician.
- Apostolos Nikolaidis, 84, Greek football player and manager.
- Prince Peter of Greece and Denmark, 71, Greek royal and anthropologist, stroke.
- Ivan Rosly, 78, Soviet general.
- Adolph Wolter, 77, German-American sculptor.
- Stane Žilič, 82–83, Slovenian Olympic gymnast (1924).

=== 16 ===
- Antal Barát-Lemberkovits, 77, Hungarian Olympic sports shooter (1932).
- Laura Boulton, 81, American ethnomusicologist.
- Alfonso Fanjul Sr., 71, Cuban-born American sugar executive.
- Henri Godding, 88, Belgian Olympic runner (1920).
- Paul Hofmann, 79, German Nazi politician.
- Donovan Joyce, 69, Australian author and radio producer, hypertensive heart disease.
- Luigi Longo, 80, Italian politician.
- Don Rehfeldt, 53, American basketball player, cancer.
- Carl Romme, 83, Dutch politician.
- Willy Schäfer, 67, Swiss Olympic handball player (1936).
- Sergey Taboritsky, 83, Soviet-German journalist and Nazi collaborator.

=== 17 ===
- Narciso J. Alegre, 69, Filipino civil rights activist.
- Leonora Armstrong, 85, American-Brazilian Baháʼí leader.
- Bert Bockett, 75, New Zealand public servant.
- Alexander Burnstein, 81, Russian-born American rabbi and theologian.
- Maurice Celhay, 69, French rugby player.
- Hugh Claughton, 88, English cricketer.
- Geof Courtenay, 58, English cricketer.
- Otávio de Faria, 72, Brazilian novelist and journalist.
- Sam Flint, 97, American actor.
- Edward P. Foley, 89, Canadian politician.
- Hans Jakobsen, 85, Danish Olympic gymnast (1920).
- Pavol Marcely, 66, Slovak general.
- Richard Gavin Reid, 101, Canadian politician.
- Johannes Võerahansu, 78, Estonian painter.

=== 18 ===
- Frank A. Capell, 73, American essayist and anticommunist activist, lung cancer.
- Hans Ehard, 92, German lawyer and politician.
- Manuel J. Fernandez, 55, American flying ace, plane crash.
- Gyula Kormos, 68, Hungarian Olympic field hockey player (1936).
- Hans Ferdinand Mayer, 84, German mathematician and physicist.
- Marcello Pagliero, 73, Italian actor and filmmaker.
- Song Yo-chan, 62, South Korean politician, acting prime minister (1961–1962), kidney disease.
- Laurie Taylor, 61, Australian footballer.
- Edwin Way Teale, 81, American naturalist, photographer and writer.
- Allen C. Thompson, 73, American politician, member of the Mississippi House of Representatives (1940–1942), heart attack.

=== 19 ===
- Bobby Bauld, 78, Scottish footballer.
- Wilhelm Bøe, 65, Norwegian humanitarian.
- D. G. Bridson, 70, British radio producer.
- Reginald Burton, 80, English cricketer.
- Frank J. Cosgrove, 65, American politician.
- Jack Deed, 79, English cricketer.
- André Hakim, 64, Egyptian-born American film producer.
- Torger Hovi, 75, Norwegian politician.
- Vera James, 88, New Zealand-Australian actress.
- Raúl Lavista, 66, Mexican film composer.
- Paul Mooney, 79, English footballer.
- Georg Rasch, 79, Danish mathematician.
- Morell Edward Sharp, 60, American jurist.

=== 20 ===
- Isobel Barnett, 62, Scottish radio and television personality (What's My Line?).
- Arthur Beer, 80, German astronomer.
- Tino Buazzelli, 58, Italian actor.
- Bill Buck, 80, Australian footballer.
- Robert C. Macon, 90, American general, pneumonia.
- Florence Pannell, 111, British supercentenarian.
- Stasys Pundzevičius, 87, Lithuanian-American general and educator.
- William A. Soderman, 68, American soldier, Medal of Honor recipient.
- Stefán Jóhann Stefánsson, 86, Icelandic politician and diplomat, prime minister (1947–1949).
- John Taylor, 76, British Olympic swimmer (1924).
- Phoebe Holcroft Watson, 82, British tennis player.
- Robert Whittaker, 59, American ecologist, lung cancer.

=== 21 ===
- Liam Abernethy, 51, Irish hurler.
- Kanjūrō Arashi, 76, Japanese actor.
- Hans Asperger, 74, Austrian physician, namesake of Asperger syndrome.
- Élie-Oscar Bertrand, 86, Canadian politician.
- Valko Chervenkov, 80, Bulgarian politician, prime minister (1950–1956).
- Herbert Dimmel, 86, Austrian painter.
- Pat Farnan, 87, Australian footballer.
- Edelmiro Julián Farrell, 93, Argentine general and politician, president (1944–1946).
- N. Kunjuraman, 74, Indian politician.
- Nazakat Mammadova, 36, Soviet Azerbaijani singer.
- Jessie Marmorston, 83, Russian-born American endocrinologist.
- Lal Chand Mehra, 83, Indian-American actor.
- Lawrence North, 76, New Zealand Baptist minister.
- David B. Todd Jr., 49, American surgeon.
- Albert L. Weiser, 87, American sports coach.

=== 22 ===
- Sammy Angott, 65, American boxer.
- Ryohei Arai, 79, Japanese film director.
- Dorothy Colpoys, 85, English badminton player.
- J. T. Krogh, 61, Danish missionary and academic administrator.
- Clifford Lee Lord, 68, American historian and academic administrator, cancer.
- Rod Lorrain, 66, Canadian ice hockey player.
- Sándor Szlatinay, 80, Hungarian film director and composer.

=== 23 ===
- Charles Adler Jr., 81, American engineer, inventor and vehicle safety advocate.
- Ali Eghbali Dogaheh, 31, Iranian general. (disappeared on this date)
- Sydney Errington, 75, British violinist.
- Frederick Goldie, 66, Scottish Anglican prelate.
- François Henri, 77, French racing cyclist.
- Anna Indermaur, 86, Swiss artist and film director.
- Gustav Krukenberg, 92, German soldier.
- Tjerk Leegstra, 68, Dutch-American Olympic field hockey player (1956).
- José Muguerza, 69, Spanish footballer.
- William Murray, 90, Australian politician.
- Ralph Ambrose O'Neill, 83, Mexican-born American flying ace.
- Dayton E. Phillips, 70, American politician, member of the U.S. House of Representatives (1947–1951).
- Tibor Rosenbaum, 56, Hungarian-born Swiss rabbi and businessman, heart attack.
- Adam Sherriff Scott, 93, Canadian painter.
- Mariano Suárez, 83, Ecuadorian politician, president (1947).
- Auguste Trémont, 87, Luxembourgish sculptor and painter.
- Bob Westfall, 61, American football player.

=== 24 ===
- Ingri d'Aulaire, 75, Norwegian-American children's author.
- Sir Richard Glyn, 9th Baronet, 73, British politician and hereditary peer, MP (1957–1970).
- Hans Gruyters, 55, Dutch murderer, heart attack.
- Leonid Ivanov, 30, Soviet test pilot, plane crash.
- Carl Nordensvan, 88, Finnish soldier and automobile businessman.
- Alexander M. Poniatoff, 88, Russian-born American electrical engineer and businessman (Ampex).
- Clemens Scheitz, 81, German actor and musician.
- Ted Thackrey, 78, American journalist and publisher.
- César Tiempo, 74, Russian-born Argentine screenwriter.

=== 25 ===
- William Browne, 81, Australian cricketer.
- Harold W. Dodds, 91, American academic administrator.
- Raymond Eudes, 68, Canadian politician, MP (1940–1965).
- Virgil Fox, 68, American organist, prostate cancer.
- Víctor Galíndez, 31, Argentine boxer and racing driver, racing crash.
- Sahir Ludhianvi, 59, Indian poet, cardiac arrest.
- Philipp, Landgrave of Hesse, 83, German royal and Nazi official.
- Madeline Stanton, 82, American librarian.
- Herb Stein, 82, American football player.
- Harold Van Buskirk, 86, American architect and fencer.

=== 26 ===
- Marcelo Caetano, 74, Portuguese politician, prime minister (1968–1974), heart attack.
- Bjørn Fongaard, 61, Norwegian composer and guitarist.
- Wilfrid Girouard, 89, Canadian jurist and politician, MP (1925–1939).
- Frederick Hanson, 66, Australian police officer, carbon monoxide poisoning.
- Lloyd Metzler, 67, American economist.
- Per-Olof Östrand, 50, Swedish Olympic swimmer (1948, 1952, 1956).
- Alan Ryan, 69, Australian footballer.
- Martha Salotti, 81, Argentine writer and educator.

=== 27 ===
- Miles Bellville, 71, British Olympic sailor (1936).
- Fred Bowen, 74, Australian politician.
- Red Conkright, 66, American football player.
- Art Hillhouse, 64, American basketball player.
- Edgar C. Jones, 76, American football and basketball player and coach and banker.
- Björn Kugelberg, 75, Swedish Olympic sprinter (1928).
- Judy LaMarsh, 55, Canadian politician, MP (1960–1968), pancreatic cancer.
- Frank Loftus, 82, American baseball player.
- Bernd T. Matthias, 62, German-born American physicist, heart attack.
- Harold E. Moore, 63, American botanist.
- Iddo Munro, 92, Australian racing cyclist.
- Harold Phillips, 70, British soldier.
- Gastone Prendato, 70, Italian football player and manager.
- José Rodrigues Miguéis, 78, Portuguese writer and translator.
- Neville St George, 83, New Zealand rugby player.
- Steve Peregrin Took, 31, English musician (T. Rex), choked.
- John Hasbrouck Van Vleck, 81, American physicist, Nobel Prize laureate (1977).

=== 28 ===
- E. R. Callister Jr., 64, American lawyer and politician, Utah attorney general (1953–1959).
- Ton Elias, 59, Dutch journalist.
- Leon Janney, 63, American actor, cancer.
- Alberto Oreamuno Flores, 75, Costa Rican politician and physician.

=== 29 ===
- George Borg Olivier, 69, Maltese politician, prime minister (1950–1955, 1962–1971), lung cancer.
- Leone Cattani, 74, Italian politician.
- Ouida MacDermott, 91, British singer and actress.
- Jean Martinet, 82, Swiss racing cyclist.
- Wilfred Proctor, 86, English footballer.
- Marion Rawson, 81, American archaeologist.
- Gerhard von Schwerin, 81, German general.
- Frank Sindone, 52, American mobster and loan shark, shot.
- Ab Tresling, 71, Dutch Olympic field hockey player (1928).

=== 30 ===
- Eberhard Brünen, 74, German politician.
- Cac Hubbard, 84, American college sports coach.
- Mizuko Nanbu, 72, Japanese scouting leader.
- Joseph Puy, 73, French racing cyclist.
- Leonard Grieve Robinson, 72, Canadian politician.
- Arne Røisland, 57, Norwegian footballer.
- Zhang Chong, 80, Chinese politician.

=== 31 ===
- Bane Andreev, 75, Yugoslav Macedonian politician.
- Raúl Campero, 60, Mexican Olympic equestrian (1948).
- Hughes Cleaver, 88, Canadian politician, MP (1935–1953).
- Pierre Cressoy, 56, French actor.
- Elizebeth Smith Friedman, 88, American cryptanalyst.
- Takuma Hisa, c. 85, Japanese martial artist.
- Harold McLinton, 33, American football player, injuries sustained in a traffic collision.
- Mill Menghini, 76–77, Australian Olympic sports shooter (1948).
- Chauncey Morehouse, 78, American jazz drummer.
- Joseph Pé, 88, Belgian racing cyclist.
- Benjamin Swig, 86, American real estate developer.
- Jan Werich, 75, Czech actor and playwright, throat cancer.
