= Deed (disambiguation) =

A deed is a kind of document in real estate.

It may also refer to:

- DEED, a 2024 poetry collection by torrin a. greathouse
- The Deed, a reality television series
- SS Deed, a British cargo ship
- Jack Deed, an English cricketer
- André Deed (1879–1940), a French actor and director

== See also ==
- Deeds
