= List of members of the International Tennis Hall of Fame =

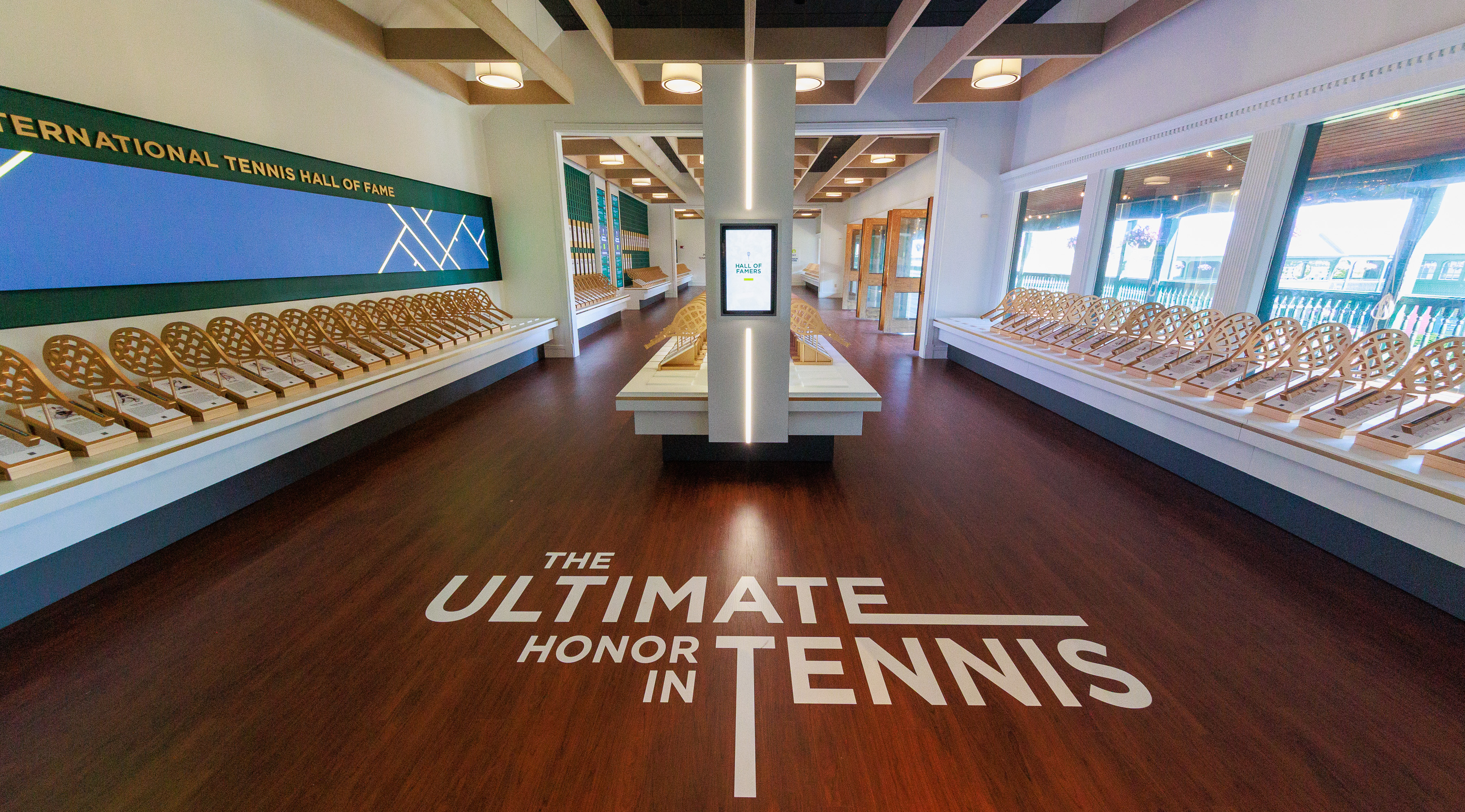
The Hall of Famers gallery at the Newport Casino which houses the Tennis Hall of Fame

The International Tennis Hall of Fame, located in Newport, Rhode Island, honors individuals who have excelled in playing and contributing to the sport of tennis. It is considered the ultimate honor that can be bestowed on a player. The Hall of Fame also honors non-players, categorized as 'contributors.' As of 2025, there are 270 individuals inducted into the Hall of Fame, representing 28 countries around the world.

There is a seven-step process to be inducted into the Tennis Hall of Fame. A player or contributor must be nominated to be inducted, and then the national enshrinement committee reviews their eligibility. Once it is decided if they are eligible, the committee reviews if the nominee will be considered by voters. After review, the voting begins; both group and fan voting takes place. A nominee must receive at least 75% from the Official Voting Group result or a combined total of 75% or more from the Official Voting Group result and any bonus percentage points they earn through the Fan Vote. Votes are tallied by an independent accounting firm and announced in January. The new class induction ceremony is then held in July at the Newport Casino which houses the Hall of Fame.

== Player category ==
Men's player
Women's player

Year	Name	Nationality	Category	Ref.
1955	Oliver Campbell	United States	Player	
1955	Joseph Clark	United States	Player	
1955	James Dwight	United States	Player	
1955	Richard Sears	United States	Player	
1955	Henry Slocum	United States	Player	
1955	Malcolm Whitman	United States	Player	
1955	Robert Wrenn	United States	Player	
1956	William Clothier	United States	Player	
1956	Dwight F. Davis	United States	Player	
1956	William Larned	United States	Player	
1956	May Sutton	United States	Player	
1956	Holcombe Ward	United States	Player	
1956	Beals Wright	United States	Player	
1957	Mary Browne	United States	Player	
1957	Hazel Hotchkiss Wightman	United States	Player	
1957	Maurice McLoughlin	United States	Player	
1957	R. Norris Williams	United States	Player	
1958	Maud Barger-Wallach	United States	Player	
1958	Molla Bjurstedt Mallory	Norway; United States	Player	
1958	Bill Johnston	United States	Player	
1958	Robert Lindley Murray	United States	Master Player	
1959	Bill Tilden	United States	Player	
1959	Helen Wills	United States	Player	
1961	Malcolm Greene Chace	United States	Player	
1961	Fred Alexander	United States	Player	
1961	Harold Hackett	United States	Player	
1961	Francis Hunter	United States	Player	
1961	Vincent Richards	United States	Player	
1962	John Doeg	United States	Player	
1962	Helen Jacobs	United States	Player	
1962	Ellsworth Vines	United States	Player	
1963	Wilmer Allison	United States	Player	
1963	Sarah Palfrey	United States	Player	
1963	John Van Ryn	United States	Player	
1964	Don Budge	United States	Player	
1964	George Lott	United States	Player	
1964	Alice Marble	United States	Player	
1964	Frank Shields	United States	Player	
1964	Sidney Wood	United States	Player	
1965	Pauline Betz	United States	Player	
1965	Ellen Hansell	United States	Player	
1965	Don McNeill	United States	Recent Player	
1965	Watson Washburn	United States	Player	
1966	Joe Hunt	United States	Player	
1966	Frank Parker	United States	Player	
1966	Theodore Pell	United States	Master Player	
1966	Ted Schroeder	United States	Player	
1967	Louise Brough	United States	Player	
1967	Margaret Osborne duPont	United States	Recent Player	
1967	Bobby Riggs	United States	Player	
1967	Bill Talbert	United States	Player	
1968	Maureen Connolly	United States	Player	
1968	Pancho Gonzales	United States	Player	
1968	Jack Kramer	United States	Player	
1968	Eleonora Sears	United States	Master Player	
1969	Karl Behr	United States	Player	
1969	Chuck Garland	United States	Master Player	
1969	Doris Hart	United States	Player	
1969	Art Larsen	United States	Player	
1969	Marie Wagner	United States	Master Player	
1970	Shirley Fry	United States	Player	
1970	Clarence Griffin	United States	Master Player	
1970	Tony Trabert	United States	Recent Player	
1971	Althea Gibson	United States	Player	
1971	Elisabeth Moore	United States	Master Player	
1971	Vic Seixas	United States	Recent Player	
1972	Bryan Grant	United States	Master Player	
1972	Gardnar Mulloy	United States	Recent Player	
1972	Elizabeth Ryan	United States	Master Player	
1973	Darlene Hard	United States	Player	
1973	Gene Mako	United States	Master Player	
1974	Juliette Atkinson	United States	Player	
1974	Bob Falkenburg	United States; Brazil	Player	
1974	Frederick Hovey	United States	Master Player	
1974	Bertha Townsend	United States	Master Player	
1975	Fred Perry	Great Britain	Master Player	
1975	Ellen Roosevelt	United States	Master Player	
1976	Jean Borotra	France	Master Player	
1976	Jacques Brugnon	France	Master Player	
1976	Mabel Cahill	Ireland	Player	
1976	Henri Cochet	France	Master Player	
1976	René Lacoste	France	Master Player	
1976	Dick Savitt	United States	Recent Player	
1977	Manuel Alonso	Spain	Master Player	
1977	Norman Brookes	Australia	Master Player	
1977	Betty Nuthall	Great Britain	Master Player	
1977	Budge Patty	United States	Recent Player	
1977	Gottfried von Cramm	German Reich; Nazi Germany; West Germany	Master Player	
1978	Maria Bueno	Brazil	Recent Player	
1978	Pierre Etchebaster	France	Master Player	
1978	Harry Hopman	Australia	Master Player	
1978	Suzanne Lenglen	France	Master Player	
1978	Kathleen McKane Godfree	Great Britain	Master Player	
1978	Anthony Wilding	New Zealand	Master Player	
1979	Margaret Court	Australia	Recent Player	
1979	Jack Crawford	Australia	Master Player	
1979	Rafael Osuna	Mexico	Recent Player	
1979	Frank Sedgman	Australia	Master Player	
1980	Laurence Doherty	Great Britain	Player	
1980	Reginald Doherty	Great Britain	Player	
1980	Lew Hoad	Australia	Master Player	
1980	Ken Rosewall	Australia	Recent Player	
1981	Dorothea Lambert Chambers	Great Britain	Player	
1981	Rod Laver	Australia	Recent Player	
1982	Roy Emerson	Australia	Recent Player	
1982	Tom Pettitt	Great Britain	Master Player	
1983	Clarence Clark	United States	Master Player	
1983	Lottie Dod	Great Britain	Player	
1983	Jaroslav Drobný	Czechoslovakia; Egypt	Master Player	
1983	Ernest Renshaw	Great Britain	Master Player	
1983	William Renshaw	Great Britain	Master Player	
1984	John Bromwich	Australia	Master Player	
1984	Neale Fraser	Australia	Master Player	
1984	Adrian Quist	Australia	Master Player	
1984	Manuel Santana	Spain	Recent Player	
1984	Pancho Segura	Ecuador; United States	Master Player	
1985	Arthur Ashe	United States	Recent Player	
1985	Ann Haydon-Jones	Great Britain	Player	
1985	Fred Stolle	Australia	Recent Player	
1986	Chuck McKinley	United States	Recent Player	
1986	John Newcombe	Australia	Recent Player	
1986	Nicola Pietrangeli	Italy	Recent Player	
1986	Tony Roche	Australia	Recent Player	
1986	Dorothy Round	Great Britain	Master Player	
1987	Björn Borg	Sweden	Recent Player	
1987	Billie Jean King	United States	Recent Player	
1987	Alex Olmedo	Peru; United States	Master Player	
1987	Dennis Ralston	United States	Recent Player	
1987	Stan Smith	United States	Recent Player	
1988	Evonne Goolagong Cawley	Australia	Recent Player	
1989	Gerald Patterson	Australia	Master Player	
1989	Virginia Wade	Great Britain	Recent Player	
1990	Jan Kodeš	Czechoslovakia	Recent Player	
1991	Ashley Cooper	Australia	Master Player	
1991	Ilie Năstase	Romania	Recent Player	
1991	Guillermo Vilas	Argentina	Recent Player	
1992	Tracy Austin	United States	Recent Player	
1992	Frew McMillan	South Africa	Recent Player	
1993	Angela Mortimer	Great Britain	Master Player	
1994	Hana Mandlíková	Czechoslovakia; Australia	Recent Player	
1995	Chris Evert	United States	Recent Player	
1996	Rosie Casals	United States	Recent Player	
1997	Bunny Austin	Great Britain	Master Player	
1997	Lesley Turner Bowrey	Australia	Master Player	
1998	Jimmy Connors	United States	Recent Player	
1999	John McEnroe	United States	Recent Player	
1999	Ken McGregor	Australia	Master Player	
2000	Mal Anderson	Australia	Master Player	
2000	Martina Navratilova	Czechoslovakia; United States	Recent Player	
2001	Ivan Lendl	Czechoslovakia; United States	Recent Player	
2001	Mervyn Rose	Australia	Master Player	
2002	Pam Shriver	United States	Recent Player	
2002	Mats Wilander	Sweden	Recent Player	
2003	Boris Becker	West Germany; Germany	Recent Player	
2003	Françoise Dürr	France	Master Player	
2003	Nancy Richey	United States	Master Player	
2004	Dorothy Cheney	United States	Master Player	
2004	Stefan Edberg	Sweden	Recent Player	
2004	Steffi Graf	West Germany; Germany	Recent Player	
2005	Jim Courier	United States	Recent Player	
2005	Yannick Noah	France	Recent Player	
2005	Jana Novotná	Czechoslovakia; Czech Republic	Recent Player	
2006	Arthur Gore	Great Britain	Master Player	
2006	Marion Jones Farquhar	United States	Master Player	
2006	Karel Koželuh	Czechoslovakia	Master Player	
2006	Herbert Lawford	Great Britain	Master Player	
2006	Simonne Mathieu	France	Master Player	
2006	Hans Nüsslein	German Reich; Nazi Germany; West Germany	Master Player	
2006	Pat Rafter	Australia	Recent Player	
2006	Gabriela Sabatini	Argentina	Recent Player	
2006	Nancye Wynne Bolton	Australia	Master Player	
2007	Sven Davidson	Sweden	Master Player	
2007	Pete Sampras	United States	Recent Player	
2007	Arantxa Sánchez Vicario	Spain	Recent Player	
2008	Michael Chang	United States	Recent Player	
2009	Andrés Gimeno	Spain	Master Player	
2009	Monica Seles	Yugoslavia; FR Yugoslavia; United States	Recent Player	
2010	Owen Davidson	Australia	Master Player	
2010	Gigi Fernández	Puerto Rico	Recent Player	
2010	Todd Woodbridge	Australia	Recent Player	
2010	Mark Woodforde	Australia	Recent Player	
2010	Natasha Zvereva	Soviet Union; Belarus	Recent Player	
2011	Andre Agassi	United States	Recent Player	
2012	Jennifer Capriati	United States	Recent Player	
2012	Gustavo Kuerten	Brazil	Recent Player	
2012	Manuel Orantes	Spain	Master Player	
2012	Randy Snow	United States	Wheelchair Tennis	
2013	Daphne Akhurst	Australia	Master Player	
2013	James Anderson	Australia	Master Player	
2013	Wilfred Baddeley	Great Britain	Master Player	
2013	Blanche Bingley	Great Britain	Master Player	
2013	Charlotte Cooper	Great Britain	Master Player	
2013	Thelma Coyne Long	Australia	Master Player	
2013	Martina Hingis	Switzerland	Recent Player	
2013	Hilde Krahwinkel Sperling	German Reich; Denmark	Master Player	
2014	Lindsay Davenport	United States	Recent Player	
2014	Chantal Vandierendonck	Netherlands	Wheelchair Tennis	
2015	David Hall	Australia	Wheelchair Tennis	
2015	Amélie Mauresmo	France	Recent Player	
2016	Justine Henin	Belgium	Recent Player	
2016	Yvon Petra	France	Master Player	
2016	Marat Safin	Russia	Recent Player	
2016	Margaret Scriven	Great Britain	Master Player	
2017	Kim Clijsters	Belgium	Recent Player	
2017	Monique Kalkman	Netherlands	Wheelchair Tennis	
2017	Andy Roddick	United States	Recent Player	
2018	Michael Stich	West Germany; Germany	Recent Player	
2018	Helena Suková	Czechoslovakia; Czech Republic	Recent Player	
2019	Yevgeny Kafelnikov	Russia	Recent Player	
2019	Li Na	China	Recent Player	
2019	Mary Pierce	France	Recent Player	
2020	Goran Ivanišević	Yugoslavia; Croatia	Recent Player	
2020	Conchita Martínez	Spain	Recent Player	
2021	Lleyton Hewitt	Australia	Recent Player	
2023	Rick Draney	United States	Wheelchair Tennis	
2023	Esther Vergeer	Netherlands	Wheelchair Tennis	
2024	Leander Paes	India	Recent Player	
2025	Bob Bryan	United States	Recent Player	
2025	Mike Bryan	United States	Recent Player	
2025	Maria Sharapova	Russia	Recent Player	
2026	Roger Federer	Switzerland	Recent Player	

=== Former members ===
The following members were player category inductees but were removed from the Hall of Fame for various reasons:

Name	Nationality	Induction Year	Expulsion Year	Reason(s)	Ref.
Bob Hewitt	South Africa	1992	2016	Convicted of child sexual offences; suspended in 2012	

== Contributor category ==
Year	Name	Nationality	Contribution(s)	Ref.
1963	Julian Myrick	United States	Tennis promoter and administrator; president of the West Side Tennis Club	
1964	George Adee	United States	Tennis official	
1965	Jimmy Van Alen	United States	Founder of the International Tennis Hall of Fame; introduced tiebreaker to tennis scoring	
1968	Allison Danzig	United States	Tennis sportswriter	
1970	Perry T. Jones	United States		
1971	Arthur Nielsen	United States	Contributions to American tennis	
1973	Alastair Martin	United States		
1975	Lawrence Baker	United States	Tennis administrator	
1979	Gladys Heldman	United States	Contributions to women's tennis and formation of the WTA	
1979	Al Laney	United States		
1979	Mary Ewing Outerbridge	United States		
1980	Gustav V of Sweden	Sweden	Contributions of Swedish tennis	
1981	William Hester	United States		
1982	William McChesney Martin	United States	President of the National Tennis Foundation and chair of the International Tennis Hall of Fame	
1982	Lance Tingay	Great Britain	Tennis sportswriter	
1986	Ted Tinling	Great Britain	Designer for tennis dresses and tennis official	
1990	Joseph Cullman	United States	Tennis administrator; sponsor of the Virginia Slims Circuit	
1992	Philippe Chatrier	France	Tennis administrator	
1993	Lamar Hunt	United States		
1994	Bud Collins	United States	Tennis sportswriter and commentator	
1996	Dan Maskell	Great Britain		
1997	Walter Clopton Wingfield	Great Britain		
1998	Herman David	Great Britain	Pioneer of professional tennis; tennis administrator	
2000	Robert J. Kelleher	United States		
2003	Brian Tobin	Australia		
2005	Butch Buchholz	United States	Tennis administrator	
2006	Gianni Clerici	Italy	Tennis commentator	
2007	Russ Adams	United States	Tennis photography	
2008	Mark McCormack	United States		
2008	Gene Scott	United States		
2009	Donald Dell	United States	Sports agent and tennis commentator; contribution to formation of Association of Tennis Professionals (ATP)	
2009	Robert Walter Johnson	United States	Coach	
2010	Derek Hardwick	Great Britain		
2010	Brad Parks	United States	Pioneer of the wheelchair tennis	
2011	Peachy Kellmeyer	United States		
2012	Mike Davies	Great Britain	Pioneer of professional tennis; tennis administrator	
2013	Cliff Drysdale	South Africa	Contribution to formation of ATP	
2013	Charlie Pasarell	United States		
2013	Ion Țiriac	Romania		
2014	John Barrett	Great Britain	Tennis official	
2014	Nick Bollettieri	United States	Coach	
2014	Jane Brown Grimes	United States	Tennis administrator	
2015	Nancy Jeffett	United States		
2017	Vic Braden	United States	Coach	
2017	Steve Flink	United States	Tennis sportswriter	
2021	Original 9: Peaches Bartkowicz; Rosie Casals; Judy Dalton; Julie Heldman; Billie Jean King; Kerry Melville; Kristy Pigeon; Nancy Richey; Valerie Ziegenfuss	United States; Australia	Activism for equal prize money and recognition of women's tennis; contribution to formation of the Women's Tennis Association (WTA)	
2021	Dennis Van der Meer	United States		
2024	Vijay Amritraj	India	Philanthropy and diplomatic activism	
2024	Richard Evans	Great Britain	Tennis sportswriter	
2026	Mary Carillo	United States	Sportscaster and journalist	

== See also ==
- Lists of tennis players
