= David Todd =

David Todd may refer to:

- David Todd (architect) (1915–2008), American architect
- David Todd (haematologist) (1928–2017), Hong Kong haematologist
- David Todd (producer), American record producer
- David B. Todd Jr. (c. 1932-1980), American surgeon
- David Peck Todd (1855–1939), American astronomer

== See also ==
- David Tod (1805–1868), politician
