= Suinaga =

Suinaga is a Spanish surname. Notable people with the surname include:

- Ciriaco Errasti Suinaga (1904–1984), Spanish footballer
- Pedro Suinaga (1907–1980), Mexican footballer
