= Frederick Dobson =

Frederick Dobson may refer to:

- Frederick William Dobson (1886–1935), English recipient of the Victoria Cross
- Frederick Dobson (cricketer) (1898–1980), English cricketer
- F.A. Dobson (1866–1948), American cinematographer
