= Mentzel =

Mentzel is a Germanic surname. Notable people with this surname include:

- Achim Mentzel (1946–2016), German actor
- Rudolf Mentzel (1900–1987), German chemist and a National Socialist science policy-maker
- Vincent Mentzel (born 1945), Dutch photographer
