= Del Morocco =

Former nightclub in Nashville, Tennessee

- Downstairs, ca. 1944
- Interactive map of Del Morocco
- Location: Nashville, Tennessee, U.S.
- Coordinates: 36°10.105′N 86°48.946′W
- Owner: Theodore "Uncle Teddy" Acklen
- Type: Nightclub; Music venue Restaurant

Construction
- Opened: 1935
- Closed: 1967
- Demolished: 1968

Del Morocco was a nightclub and music venue on Jefferson Street, in Nashville, Tennessee, U.S., active in the period 1935–1967.

== Background ==
The history of Nashville, Tennessee, music goes back to the early settlers in America. By the 19th century, Nashville was a publishing hub of various music genres. In the 1870s, a group of Fisk University students formed the Fisk Jubilee Singers, an African-American acappella ensemble and began to tour and raise funds for the college, with a repertoire of mostly traditional spirituals. The city's past encompassed a variety of genres, yet Nashville became closely associated with country music, particularly after the Grand Ole Opry began on the WSM AM radio station, in 1925, and became a hit, which lasts to this day. Alongside country, many venues in Nashville were offering blues music, such as the famed Bijou Theatre, where Bessie Smith, Ethel Waters, Ma Rainey, and other artists performed. Thereafter, similar venues in the Jefferson Street area started opening up.

== The club ==
Locally born and raised Theodore Acklen, known to most people as "Uncle Teddy" and described as a "self-made young man who scrambled up from the streets," engaged in various schemes such as running numbers. In 1935, he launched the club Del Morocco on 2417 Jefferson Street. After buying the building from a Pullman porter, he turned the upstairs into a "swanky" dining space, which he named the Blue Room restaurant. Behind it, he opened a gambling room, reserved for select clients, while downstairs he erected, after a time, a bandstand, turning the space into a music venue. With the help of his wife, former dancer Ehrai "Muffy" Walker, he started booking well known acts, making the venue famous. Soon, students from Fisk, Tennessee State, and Meharry began frequenting the place. Acklen hired renown chefs over from the "distinguished," 1853-built Belle Meade mansion to work in the Blue Room, by then sitting some one hundred people, and offered piano music; the place started attracting patrons from the black community's middle class, as well as celebrities such as Joe Louis.

From pre-World War II jazz, blues, and gospel in Nashville, emerged, in the 1950s, soul music and modern rhythm and blues, with artists such as Little Richard and Jimi Hendrix playing in Del Morocco and elsewhere in North Nashville. Billy Cox and Hendrix were actually performing in Del Morocco's house band for a period of time. They called themselves the King Kasuals, and their members were for a time Hendrix and Alphonso "Baby Boo" Young on guitar, Cox on bass, Buford Majors on saxophone, and an unidentified drummer. Hendrix and Cox came to Nashville after serving in the 101st Airborne and once sat in a "Whites Only" section of a Nashville diner, in 1962, both under 20 years old. They were arrested and Del Morocco's owner had to bail them out. (Note: Acklen, who also owned and ran an amateur baseball team called the Morocco Stars, was later active in the civil rights movement, organizing various protests, such as against the appearance of the tennis team from apartheid South Africa in the 1978 Davis Cup held in Nashville. See Biondi (2025). He died in 1981, aged 73.)

The period until 1965 is considered the golden age of Jefferson Street, with stars such as Duke Ellington, Cab Calloway, Count Basie, and Ella Fitzgerald, performing there almost every night. Recording artists, such as Ruth Brown, Nat King Cole, and Ray Charles, could be seen on stage at Del Morocco. The places were "packed" and "jumping."

Del Morocco, along with the New Era Club and Maceo's, collectively, made Jefferson Street known as Nashville's original Music Row.

== Demolition ==
In 1960, Nashville became the South's first desegregated city. On November 2, 1967, construction began on Interstate 40 that would cut through the area once known as "Black Wall Street." The interstate highway, completed by 1968, separated black people from commerce activities, forcing the closure of almost all black-owned businesses in the area, including Del Morocco.

== Legacy ==
In 2011, the Jefferson Street Sound museum, recording studio, and rehearsal space opened, housed in a small, white house on the block between Dr. D.B. Todd Jr. Boulevard and the I-40 overpass. Its curator, Lorenzo Washington, aims at preserving there the legacy of Music City's famed "hotbed" of blues and R&B, once found in clubs like Del Morocco. Blues singer and songwriter Marion James, who had often appeared in Del Morocco and had been impressed by young Hendrix there, was a major contributor of memorabilia to the museum.

== See also ==
- Chitlin' Circuit
- Smalls Paradise
- Cotton Club
- Sunset Cafe
- Black and tan clubs
