= Lawrence Weingarten =

American film producer

- Born: December 30, 1897; Chicago, Illinois, U.S.
- Died: February 5, 1975 (aged 77); Los Angeles, California, U.S.
- Occupation: Film producer
- Years active: 1921–1968
- Spouses: Sylvia Thalberg (m. 1928; div. 1943) Jessie Marmorston (m. 1945)

Lawrence Weingarten (December 30, 1897 – February 5, 1975) was an American film producer. He was best known for working for Metro-Goldwyn-Mayer and producing some of the studio's most prestigious films such as Adam's Rib (1949), I'll Cry Tomorrow (1955) and Cat on a Hot Tin Roof (1958).

During his career, Weingarten was nominated for an Academy Award in 1959 and was given the Irving G. Thalberg Memorial Award in 1974, which was presented by Katharine Hepburn in her first and only appearance at the Oscars ceremony to present the award to her longtime friend Weingarten. Whenever she won an Oscar, she always had either the presenter or another person associated with her film accept it on her behalf. Upon taking the stage, she received a standing ovation, to which she replied, "I'm living proof that a person can wait forty-one years to be unselfish", a reference to her first Oscar win in 1933.

== Early life and career ==
Weingarten was born in Chicago, Illinois on December 30, 1897. He began his career as a publicity man for Thomas H. Ince and First National Pictures. In 1921, he independently produced a series of Biblical films. He was also involved in the production of Buster Keaton comedies, as well as Marie Dressler and Polly Moran films early in his career.

Weingarten joined MGM under contract as an associate producer in 1927, working as an assistant to Harry Rapf. Weingarten became Thalberg's assistant and was put in charge of supervising comedies. Thalberg assigned him to supervise Buster Keaton who had just joined MGM. Keaton later wrote "for quite a while he [Weingarten] exercised little more authority over my crew, cast, and selection of story material than the fat cop on the corner. But just about the time I was divorced, Mr. Weingarten decided to stop being a rubberstamp executive and take over as a producer with an iron will." Keaton also wrote, "Nobody can deny that Larry learned his trade somewhere along the line and learned it well. But his trade was never slapstick comedy, and that was what I was still doing whether he and the studio's top dogs realized it or not." Keaton's films for MGM were initially very successful financially but gradually became less and less popular.

It was during this tumultuous period of the early 1930s, dealing with Keaton and a Dressler/Moran film, when "general dissatisfaction with Weingarten's work" led to his health taking "a serious hit" and he "suffered a nervous breakdown and was placed on leave of absence."

During Weingarten's almost forty-year-long tenure at MGM, he produced 75 films, including A Day at the Races (1937), Adam's Rib (1949), Pat and Mike (1952), The Tender Trap (1955), I'll Cry Tomorrow (1955), Don't Go Near the Water (1957) and Cat on a Hot Tin Roof (1958).

Weingarten made a number of films directed by George Cukor. According to Patrick McGilligan, Cukor's biographer, the director "as well as Tracy and Hepburn and the Kanins — regarded Weingarten as a toady of the studio, although his vehemence on this issue may have been complicated by the fact that Weingarten, for many years, rented one of the houses on the director's estate."

Dore Schary, one-time head of production at MGM, wrote in his memoirs that Weingarten was a good producer:

Larry, as a longtime fixture at MGM and accustomed to wielding authority, appeared to shy away from me during my early days as head of production. (There was a rumor floating around that Mayer and I were doomed to find ourselves on a collision course and that if I lasted a year it would be a surprise.) But Larry relaxed as he learned I was trying to make everyone aware that I was sensitive to their prior relationships but that I also intended to do exactly what I had agreed to do — run production. Larry turned out some fine films.

=== Avon Productions ===
Don't Go Near the Water was the first of 12 pictures from Avon Productions, a company Weingarten formed with Pandro Berman. Both men would work on productions but only one would take credit. Weingarten said "after all these years we felt that it was time we shared in the profits of the pictures we made."

This company wound up in April 1961.

=== Later career ===
In May 1961 Weingarten formed a new company which was to produce Period of Adjustment and The Travels of Jamie McPheeters (the latter was made as a TV series).

In 1962, he served as president of the Screen Producers Guild.

In 1964 Weingarten produced The Unsinkable Molly Brown, his first musical.

Weingarten was last credited as a producer on The Impossible Years (1968), although he unsuccessfully sought to make some other films afterwards including Roses Are Blue and Christy.

Weingarten received the Irving G. Thalberg Memorial Award during the annual Academy Award telecast in 1974.

== Personal life ==
Weingarten was married to Sylvia Thalberg from 1928 to 1939 and Jessie Marmorston from 1945 until his death.

He died on February 5, 1975, aged 77.

== Filmography as producer ==
- The Cameraman (1928)
- The Broadway Melody (1929)
- Sidewalks of New York (1931)
- What-No Beer? (1933)
- The Nuisance (1933)
- When Ladies Meet (1933)
- Should Ladies Behave (1933)
- Sadie McKee (1934)
- The Mystery of Mr. X (1934)
- The Bishop Misbehaves (1935)
- Rendezvous (1935)
- The Unguarded Hour (1936)
- His Brother's Wife (1936)
- Libeled Lady (1936) (Academy Award nomination)
- The Last of Mrs. Cheyney (1937)
- A Day at the Races (1937) (uncredited)
- Too Hot to Handle (1938)
- Balalaika (1939)
- I Take This Woman (1940)
- I Love You Again (1940)
- Escape (1940)
- Without Love (1945)
- Adam's Rib (1949)
- Invitation (1952)
- Pat and Mike (1952)
- The Actress (1953)
- Rhapsody (1954)
- The Tender Trap (1955)
- I'll Cry Tomorrow (1955)
- Don't Go Near the Water (1957)
- Cat on a Hot Tin Roof (1958) (Academy Award and BAFTA nominations)
- The Gazebo (1959)
- The Honeymoon Machine (1961)
- Ada (1961)
- Period of Adjustment (1962)
- The Unsinkable Molly Brown (1964)
- Signpost to Murder (1964)
- The Impossible Years (1968)
