= Clayton Robson =

Indian-born English cricketer

Personal information
- Full name: Clayton Graeme Wynne Robson
- Born: 3 July 1901; Bareilly, North-Western Provinces, British India
- Died: 26 February 1989 (aged 87); Long Melford, Suffolk
- Batting: Right-handed

Domestic team information
- Years: Team
- 1921: Worcestershire
- 1926: Middlesex

Career statistics
Competition	First-class
Matches	6
Runs scored	136
Batting average	15.11
100s/50s	0/0
Top score	46
Catches/stumpings	2/–
- Source: CricInfo, 21 May 2017

Clayton Graeme Wynne Robson (3 July 1901 – 26 February 1989) was an Indian-born English first-class cricketer who played six matches: two for Worcestershire in 1921, then four for Middlesex in 1926.

== Life ==
Robson was born in Bareilly in the North-Western Provinces in British India and went to school at Malvern College in England. He played cricket for Malvern, captaining the school team in his final year and then went on to the Royal Military College, Sandhurst, and was again cricket captain.

Robson hit 5 and 46 on his debut against Hampshire, and was retained for the county's next game, against Glamorgan. Robson scored 9 and 43, but then dropped out of the team.

He was not to reappear in county cricket for another five years, but then played four times for Middlesex. In six innings for the county he scored only 33 runs with a highest score of only 12, and by August he was again dropped from the team, never again to return to the first-class game.

Outside cricket, he was a fine rackets player, winning the Public School's rackets pairs in 1920 with Jack Deed.

Robson died in Long Melford in Suffolk in 1989 at the age of 87.
