= Ton Elias (journalist) =

Dutch journalist (1921–1980)

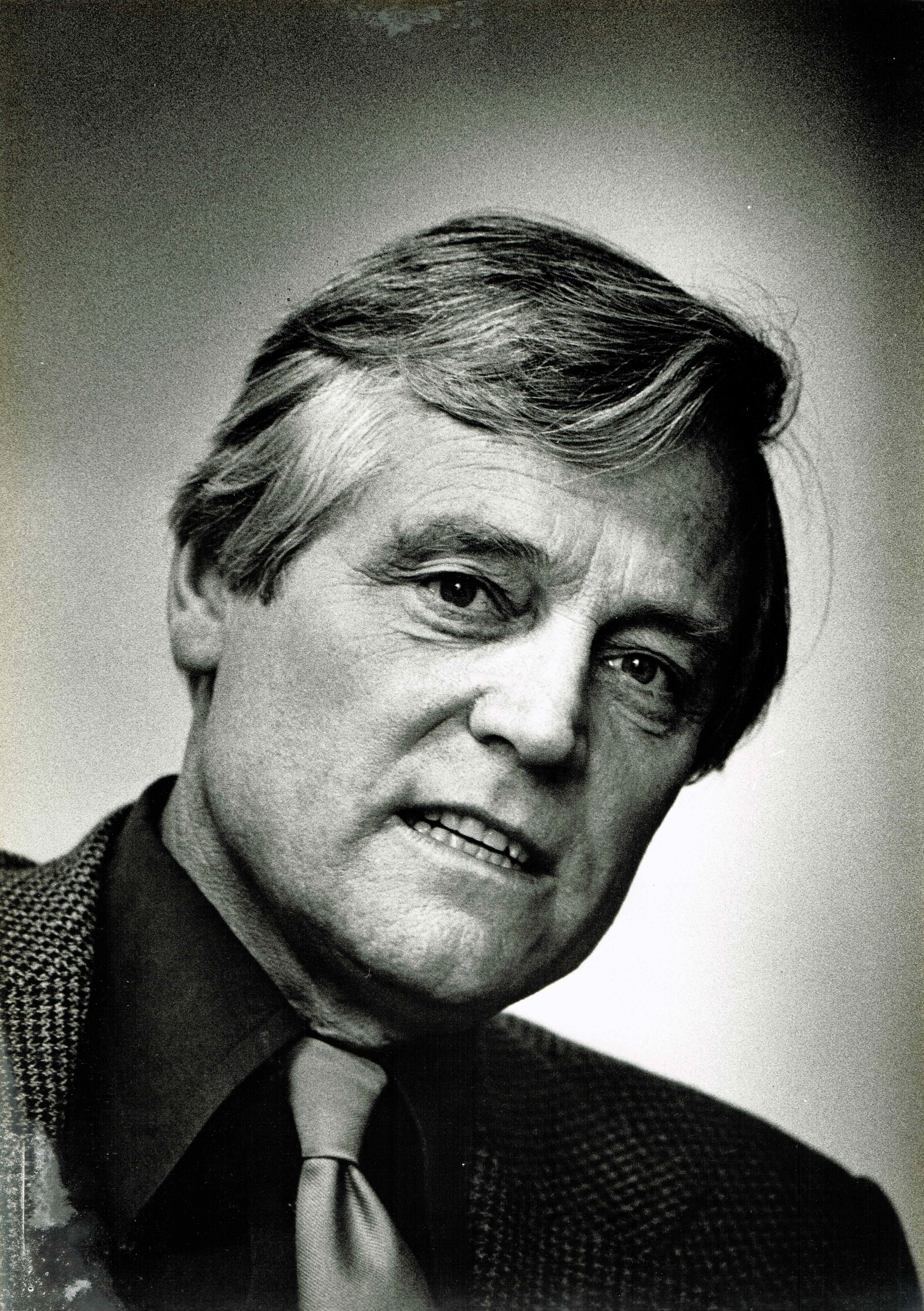
- Elias (1977) (Photo: Vincent Mentzel)
- Born: Anton Elias; 15 January 1921; Amsterdam
- Died: 28 October 1980 (aged 59); Den Haag
- Occupation: Journalist
- Years active: 1945-1980
- Children: Ton Elias
- Career
- Country: Netherlands

Anton "Ton" Elias (15 January 1921, Amsterdam – 28 October 1980, The Hague) was a Dutch journalist. He is best known as the first Dutch journalist to specialize in education.

== Early life ==
Elias grew up in Amsterdam, where his father had a shoe store on Leidse Street. His mother died when he was three years old, and his father died when he was thirteen. He was taken in by his uncle and aunt, who lived in Hilversum.

In order to escape being pressed into forced labor during the German occupation of the Netherlands, he fled to the Pyrenees mountains via Paris in 1943. He wanted to travel to England via Spain in order to join the Princess Irene Brigade. He was betrayed by a ferryman and put in prison in Toulouse. From there he was transported to Buchenwald concentration camp via Compiègne. In November 1944 he escaped, but he was captured again within two weeks. As punishment he was put in a cell and after a month was put to work processing human waste. The camp was liberated on April 11, 1945.

== Career ==
In 1947, Elias joined the newspaper De Tijd. He worked as the chief of the editorial staff and specialized in education. He covered such topics as the Secondary Education Act (or Mammoth Act) and the development of Middenschool.

When De Tijd stopped being produced as a daily newspaper, Elias became the education editor for the NRC Handelsblad. At both papers he wrote a column called "Notebook" ("Cahier"), which was influential. Elias also wrote regularly about concentration camps, partly based on his own experiences at Buchenwald.

From 1950 to 1970, Elias wrote theater reviews for the Katholieke Illustratie.

In 1967, Elias was awarded the M. van Blankenstein Prize. In 1970 he was made a knight in the Order of Orange-Nassau.

He died on 28 October 1980.

== Archive ==
In 1982, Elias's widow donated his papers to the Dutch Ministry of Education. His papers were then transferred to the National Education Museum in 1992.

== Selected publications ==
- Van mammoet tot wet (Den Haag, 1963).
- Voortgezet onderwijs voor uw kind na de lagere school ('s-Gravenhage, [1966]).
- Na de lagere school? ('s-Gravenhage, 1967 and 1968).
- De eed in de kaatsbaan, alsnog (Utrecht, 1973). Reprinted in Elias (1982), p. 39-54.
- Onderwijsjournalistiek, een nieuw specialisme (Katholieke Onderwijs Vereniging, 1977).
- 'Onderwijsvernieuwing in Nederland', Ons Erfdeel 20 (1977).
- Dertig jaar onderwijs - zwart op wit. Een selectie uit de artikelen, commentaren en Cahiers van de onderwijsjournalist Ton Elias geschreven in de periode 1946 tot en met 1980. Selected by Jos Ahlers, Ton Elias jr., Jos van Kemenade and Patrick Spijkerman (Groningen, 1982). With pictures by Vincent Mentzel and illustrations by Jan Willem van Vugt.
