= Lists of tennis players =

There are several lists of tennis players:

Men

- List of male singles tennis players
- List of male doubles tennis players
- Rankings
  - List of ATP number 1 ranked singles tennis players
  - List of ATP number 1 ranked doubles tennis players
  - World number 1 ranked male tennis players
  - Top ten ranked male tennis players
  - Top ten ranked male tennis players (1912–1972)

Women

- List of female tennis players
- Rankings
  - List of WTA number 1 ranked singles tennis players
  - List of WTA number 1 ranked doubles tennis players
  - World number 1 ranked female tennis players
  - Top ten ranked female tennis players
  - Top ten ranked female tennis players (1921–1974)

Tournament winners

- List of Australian Open champions
- List of French Open champions
- List of Wimbledon champions
- List of US Open champions
- List of Olympic tennis medalists

Professional tours

- List of tennis title leaders in the Open Era

Others

- List of members of the International Tennis Hall of Fame
