= Jimmy Joyce =

Australian rules footballer, born 1907

Personal information
- Full name: Jimmy Joyce
- Born: 27 May 1907
- Died: 8 October 1980 (aged 73)

Playing career^{1}
Years	Club	Games (Goals)
1931	Footscray	13 (5)
- ^{1} Playing statistics correct to the end of 1931.

Jimmy Joyce (27 May 1907 – 8 October 1980) was a former Australian rules footballer who played with Footscray in the Victorian Football League (VFL).
