= John Sutcliffe (footballer) =

English footballer

Personal information
- Date of birth: 27 June 1913
- Place of birth: England
- Date of death: 5 October 1980 (aged 67)

Senior career*
Years	Team	Apps	(Gls)
	Corinthian	?	(?)

International career
1936	Great Britain	2	(0)
- * Club domestic league appearances and goals

John Sutcliffe (26 June 1913 – 5 October 1980) was an English footballer who represented Great Britain at the 1936 Summer Olympics. Sutcliffe played amateur football for Corinthian.
