= Jessie Marmorston =

American scientist

- Jessie Marmorston, from a 1980 newspaper
- Born: September 15, 1897; Kyiv, Russian Empire
- Died: October 21, 1980 (aged 83); Los Angeles, California, US
- Occupations: Physician, endocrinologist, college professor
- Spouse(s): Julius Gottesman David Perla (m. 1933; died 1940) Lawrence Weingarten (m. 1945; died 1975)
- Relatives: Samuel Pisar (son-in-law)

Jessica "Jessie" Marmorston (1897 – October 21, 1980) was a Russian-born American physician, endocrinologist, and medical school professor.

== Early life and education ==
Marmorston was born in Kyiv, Ukraine, then a part of the Russian Empire, the daughter of Aaron Marmoston and Ethel Wark Marmoston. Her family was Jewish. She moved to the United States as a child, with her parents, and grew up in Buffalo, New York. She completed her medical degree at the University of Buffalo School of Medicine in 1924.

== Career ==
Marmorston served a bacteriology internship at the Montefiore Hospital in New York City. At Cornell University Medical College she worked as an immunologist with David Perla. In 1943, she became an assistant professor of medicine at the University of Southern California (USC). In 1953 she became professor of experimental medicine, and in 1957 clinical professor of medicine. She was elected a fellow of the American College of Physicians. She held attending physician privileges at Cedars-Sinai Medical Center and Los Angeles County Hospital. In 1972, she was quoted in an Ann Landers column on breastfeeding, as a "distinguished endocrinologist".

While based in Los Angeles, Marmorston was the personal physician and daily confidante of studio head Louis B. Mayer. She parlayed her Hollywood connections to raise funds for USC scholarships. In 1960, the Los Angeles Times named her one of their ten Women of the Year.

== Selected publications ==
Marmorston's research focused on the interactions of hormones, mental health, heart disease, and cancer. Her work was published in academic journals including Science, Archives of Internal Medicine, Journal of Experimental Medicine, The Journal of Clinical Endocrinology and Metabolism, American Review of Tuberculosis, The Journal of Urology, American Journal of Obstetrics and Gynecology, Journal of Clinical Psychology, and Cancer Research. A selection of articles and monographs written or co-written by Marmorston suggests the range of her studies:

- The Spleen and Its Relation to Resistance (1926, with David Perla)
- "Effect of Splenectomy on a Latent Infection, Eperythrozoon Coccoides, in White Mice" (1935)
- "The Effect of Splenectomy on Tuberculous Infection in Mice" (1937)
- Natural Resistance and Clinical Medicine (1941, with David Perla)
- "Experimental Basis of Sulfonamide Therapy in Bacillary Dysentery" (1946, with Frederick J. Moore, John F. Kessel, and D. G. Simonsen)
- "The Possible Role of Squalene as a Protective Agent in Sebum" (1956, with Harry Sobel)
- "Effects of Long-Term Estrogen Therapy on Serum Cholesterol and Phospholipids in Men with Myocardial Infarction" (1959, with Frederick J. Moore, Oscar Magdison, Oliver Kuzma, and Jack J. Lewis)
- "Prognostic Features of Acute Myocardial Infarction in Men: A One-Year Study at the Los Angeles County Hospital" (1960, with Albert E. White and Frederick J. Moore)
- "Effect of Two Synthetic Estrogens on the Level of Serum Protein-Bound Iodine in Men and Women with Atherosclerotic Heart Disease" (1961, with Ralph W. Alexander)
- "Scoring Raven's Coloured Progressive Matrices to Differentiate Brain Damage" (1964, with Ray B. Evans)
- "Hormone Excretion Patterns in Breast and Prostate Cancer Are Abnormal" (1964, with Elizabeth Stern, Carl E. Hopkins, and John M. Weiner)

== Personal life ==
Marmorston married a fellow physician, Julius Gottesman; they divorced. Her second husband was her colleague, David Perla; they married in 1933 and he died in 1940. Her third husband was film producer Lawrence Weingarten. They married in 1945, and he died in 1975. She had three daughters. One of her daughters married lawyer and diplomat Samuel Pisar. One of her granddaughters is married to financier Daniel Pinto. Jessie Marmorston died in 1980, in her late seventies or early eighties, in Los Angeles.
