= Annie Constance Tocker =

Librarian, Methodist deaconess, nurse, child welfare officer

Annie Constance Tocker (6 May 1889 – 13 October 1980) was a notable New Zealand librarian, Methodist deaconess, nurse and child welfare officer. She was born in Greytown, Wairarapa, New Zealand in 1889.
