= William Browne (cricketer) =

Australian cricketer

Personal information
- Born: 6 November 1898; Toowoomba, Queensland, Australia
- Died: 25 October 1980 (aged 81); Southport, Queensland, Australia
- Source: Cricinfo, 1 October 2020

William Browne (6 November 1898 – 25 October 1980) was an Australian cricketer. He played in one first-class match for Queensland in 1921/22.

== See also ==
- List of Queensland first-class cricketers
