= Deeds =

Deeds may refer to:

- Deed, a legal instrument used to grant a right
- Recorder of deeds, a government office responsible for tracking deeds and other documents
- Mr. Deeds Goes to Town, a 1936 comedy film starring Gary Cooper
- Mr. Deeds, a 2002 remake of Mr Deeds Goes to Town starring Adam Sandler

== See also ==
- Deeds (surname)
