= Charles Harbidge =

English footballer

Personal information
- Full name: Charles William Harbidge
- Date of birth: 15 July 1891
- Place of birth: England
- Date of death: 10 October 1980 (aged 89)

Senior career*
| Years | Team | Apps | (Gls) |
| – | Reading | ? | (?) |

International career
| 1920 | Great Britain | 1 | (0) |
- * Club domestic league appearances and goals

Charles William Harbidge (15 July 1891 – 1 October 1980) was an English footballer who represented Great Britain at the 1920 Summer Olympics.
