= Leo Glans =

Surinamese painter (1911–1980)

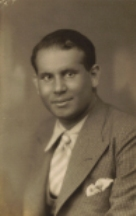
- Born: Leo Hendriques Hugo Glans; 11 April 1911; Paramaribo, Suriname
- Died: 9 October 1980 (aged 69); Wassenaar, Netherlands
- Occupation: painter

Leo Hendriques Hugo Glans (11 April 1911 in Paramaribo – 9 October 1980 in Wassenaar) was a Surinamese painter. He was the first Surinamese to study at the Rijksakademie.

In 1927, Glans opened the Van Gogh studio. There was no proper education for art painting in Suriname and therefore he applied for a scholarship, and in 1929 leaves for Amsterdam. During 1929 and 1930, Glans spent his Saturdays in Natura Artis Magistra drawing animals. Between 1936 and 1938, Glans starts to explore many modernist movements like cubism and expressionism. Many still lifes are painted during that period as well. Around 1940, Glans becomes blind, because of leprosy. In 1946, Glans married, moved to Wassenaar were they started an art collection.

== Bibliography ==
- C.H. de Jonge-Verduin Licht en duisternis; De Surinaamse schilder Leo Glans (1911-1980). Amsterdam: KIT, 2005.
