= Pavol Marcely =

Slovak military general (1914–1980)

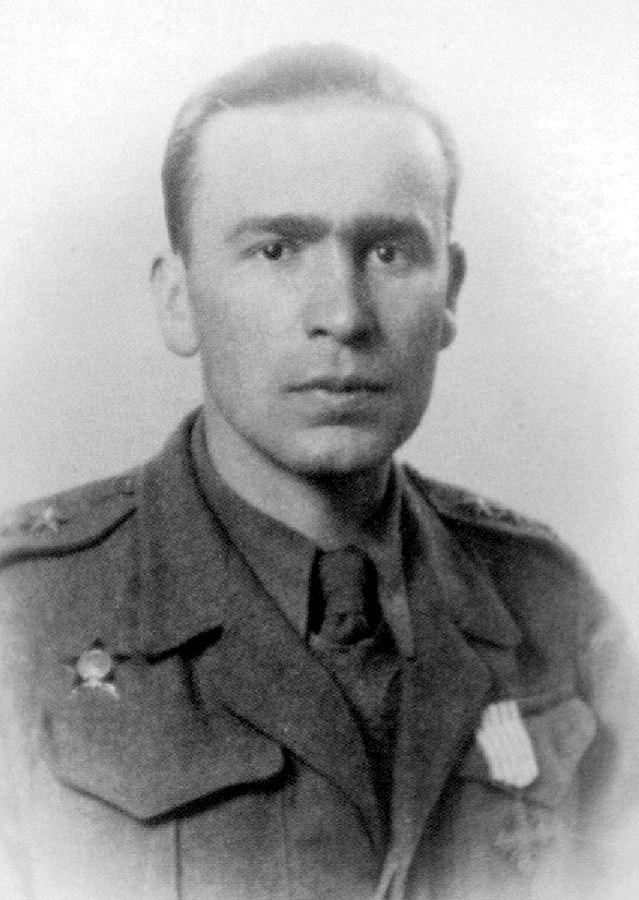
- Portrait of Pavol Marcely
- Born: 26 June 1914; Zvolen, Austria-Hungary (now Slovakia)
- Died: August 17, 1980 (aged 66) Piešťany, Czechoslovakia
- Known for: Youngest officer of Slovak nationality to be appointed to the first general rank

Pavol Marcely (26 June 1914, Zvolen – 17 October 1980, Piešťany) was a Slovak general, educator and anti-fascist fighter.

== Early life ==
Until 1933 he studied at the Teachers' Institute in Banská Bystrica, later at the Faculty of Arts of the Comenius University in Bratislava.

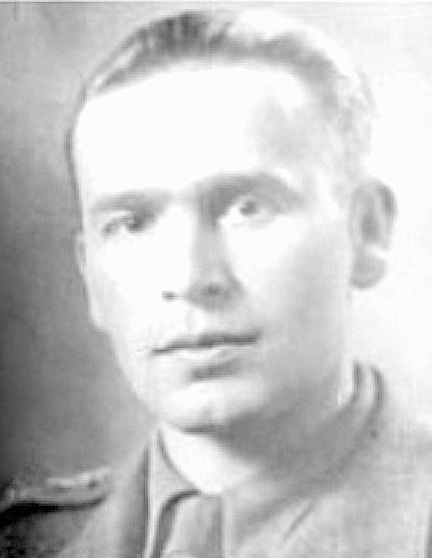
Digitized photo of Marcely from around 1945–1947

== Military career ==
Marcely was a participant in the pro-fascist resistance in the Slovak Army, during the SNP a staff captain, and a member of the Czechoslovak army in the USSR. He fought in the Carpathian-Dukla operation, on 15 October 1944, he was landed with his brigade at the Tri duby airfield, today Sliač Airport, after the SNP crossed into the mountains he fought in the most dangerous sections of the front. On 5 December 1944, he was seriously wounded. At the age of 36 he became the youngest officer of Slovak nationality to be appointed to the first general rank. He was the leader of a group of 200 Slovaks which would join the 1st Czechoslovak Reserve Regiment in Novokhopersk on 5 July 1943. Marcely became a brigadier general on October 1, 1950. At the end of September 1953 he was transferred to the reserve. He was reactivated in the Czechoslovak People's Army in early August 1968 with the military rank of Major General. He was subsequently assigned to the Military History Institute in the Department of Military History of Slovakia in Bratislava. From 1969 to 1971 he served as a military and aviation attaché in Belgrade. From there he joined the MNO in Prague, where he performed staff functions. He left for the reserve at the end of July 1973, before being recalled.

== Awards and legacy ==
Marcely has been awarded with:

- 1943 Soviet Order of the Red Star
- 1943 and 1945 Czechoslovak War Cross 1939
- 1945 and 1969 Order of the Great Patriotic War II degree
- 1946 Order of the Slovak National Party I class
- Yugoslav Order of Merit for the Nation I class
- Romanian Order of Virtuti militari
- 1948 Polish War Cross, 1949 Order of February 25
- 1948, Czechoslovak Military Order of the White Lion For Victory I degree
- 1955 For Merit in Construction
- 1964 Order of the Red Star

The Pavol Marcely Elementary School in Bratislava was named after him.
