= Gordon R. Fisher =

American sports coach (1895–1980)

Biographical details
- Born: July 21, 1895; Cavalier, North Dakota, U.S.
- Died: October 8, 1980 (aged 85); Sun City, Arizona, U.S.

Playing career

Football
- 1917–1918: North Dakota
- 1922–1923: Northern State
- 1924–1925: Minnesota
- Positions: Fullback, guard, end

Coaching career (HC unless noted)

Football
- 1926–1942: North Central
- 1944–?: Indiana

Basketball
- 1926–1927: North Central

Track
- ?: North Central
- 1944–1961: Indiana

Administrative career (AD unless noted)
- 1926–1943: North Central

Head coaching record
- Overall: 69–48–13 (football); 14–1 (basketball)

Gordon R. Fisher (July 21, 1895 – October 8, 1980) was an American football, basketball, and track coach. He served as the head football coach at North Central College from 1926 to 1942, compiling a record of 69–48–13. Fisher also coached basketball and track at North Central. He was the head track coach at Indiana University Bloomington from 1944 to 1961. At Indiana, he was also and assistant football coach under head coach Bo McMillin. Fisher died on October 8, 1980, at Beverly Manor Nursing Home in Sun City, Arizona.

Fisher played football and ran track at the University of Minnesota.

== Head coaching record ==
=== Football ===
Year	Team	Overall	Conference	Standing	Bowl/playoffs
North Central Cardinals (Illinois Intercollegiate Athletic Conference) (1926–1937)
1926	North Central	5–4	3–2	8th	
1927	North Central	5–3–1	2–1–1	T–7th	
1928	North Central	4–3–2	2–3–1	T–13th	
1929	North Central	3–5–1 (Note: North Central finished the season 6–0–1 in conference play, but forfeited their share of the title and four wins, over Lake Forest, Augustana (IL), Carthage, and Monmouth (IL), because of an ineligible player.)	2–4–1	T–16th	
1930	North Central	6–2–1	2–2–1	T–12th	
1931	North Central	5–2	4–2	T–6th	
1932	North Central	4–5	2–4	T–12th	
1933	North Central	4–0–2	2–0–2	T–2nd	
1934	North Central	5–2	3–2	T–8th	
1935	North Central	4–3	3–3	11th	
1936	North Central	4–2–1	3–1–1	T–3rd	
1937	North Central	1–3–3	1–2–3	T–16th	
North Central Cardinals (Illinois College Conference) (1938–1942)
1938	North Central	3–4	1–3	T–8th	
1939	North Central	2–4–1	0–3	9th	
1940	North Central	4–3	1–3	7th	
1941	North Central	5–1–1	3–1–1	3rd	
1942	North Central	5–2	1–1	5th	
North Central:		69–48–13	35–37–11		
Total:		69–48–13			
