= SS Empire Deed =

World War II merchant ship of the United Kingdom

History
- Name: Empire Deed (1943-46); Deed (1946-51); Doro (1951-56); Leonidas Cambanis (1956-64); Ever Fortune (1964); Ever Happiness (1964-67)
- Owner: Ministry of War Transport (1943-45); Ministry of Transport (1945-46); Sussex Steamship Co Ltd (1946-51); Compagnia Navigazione Doro (1951-56); Z L Cambanis & others (1956-64); Reliance Marine Corporation (1964); First Steamship Co Ltd (1964-67)
- Operator: Mungo Campbell & Co Ltd (1943-46); S G Embiricos Ltd (1946-51); Compagnia Navigazione Doro (1951-56); Z L Cambanis & others (1956-64); First Steamship Co Ltd (1964-66)
- Port of registry: (United Kingdom) Sunderland (1943-46); London, United Kingdom (1946-51); Panama City, Panama (1951-56); Piraeus, Greece (1956-64); Monrovia, Liberia (1964); Taipeh, Taiwan (1964-67)
- Builder: Bartram & Sons Ltd
- Yard number: 295
- Launched: 6 February 1943
- Completed: May 1943
- Identification: United Kingdom Official Number 169113 (1943-46); Code Letters GDNS (1943-46)
- Fate: Scrapped

General characteristics
- Type: Cargo ship
- Tonnage: 6,766 GRT; 4,639 NRT
- Length: 416 ft 8 in (127.00 m)
- Beam: 56 ft 6 in (17.22 m)
- Draught: 26 feet 6 1/2 inches (8.090 m)
- Depth: 34 ft 0 in (10.36 m)
- Armament: Anti-torpedo nets (1943-45)

Empire Deed was a 6,766 GRT cargo ship that was built in 1943 by Bartram & Sons Ltd, Sunderland, Co Durham, United Kingdom the Ministry of War Transport (MoWT). In 1946, she was sold into merchant service and renamed Deed. In 1951, she was sold to Panama and renamed Doro. A sale to Greece in 1956 saw her renamed Leonidas Cambanis. In 1964, she was sold to Liberia and renamed Ever Fortune followed by a sale to Taiwan later that year and renaming to Ever Happiness. She served until 1967, when she was scrapped at Kaohsiung, Taiwan.

== Description ==
The ship was built in 1943 by Bartram & Sons Ltd, Sunderland, Co Durham. She was yard number 295.

The ship was 416 feet 8 inches (127.00 m) long, with a beam of 56 feet 6 inches (17.22 m). She had a depth of 34 feet 0 inches (10.36 m) and a draught of 26 feet 6 1/2 inches (8.090 m). She was assessed at 6,766 GRT, 4,639 NRT.

The ship was propelled by a triple expansion steam engine, which had cylinders of 24 1/2 inches (62 cm), 39 inches (99 cm) and 70 inches (180 cm) diameter by 48 inches (120 cm) stroke. The engine was built by North East Marine Engine (1938) Ltd, Sunderlane.

== History ==
=== World War II ===
==== 1943 ====
Empire Deed was built for the MoWT. She was launched on 6 February 1943 and completed in May. She was placed under the management of Mungo, Campbell & Co Ltd. Her port of registry was Sunderland. The United Kingdom Official Number 169113 and Code Letters BFJS were allocated. On 25 May, she was damaged by enemy bombing at Sunderland. She was quickly repaired, and departed from Sunderland on 10 June 1943 for Middlesbrough, Yorkshire. She departed from Middlesbrough on 30 June for the Tyne. On 4 August, she departed from the Tyne to join Convoy FN 1090, which had departed from Southend, Essex on 3 August and arrived at Methil, Fife on 5 August. She then joined Convoy EN 265, which departed from Methil on 6 August and arrived at Loch Ewe on 8 August. Empire Deed left the convoy at Oban, Argyllshire. She departed from Oban on 9 August to join Convoy OS 53KM, which departed from Liverpool, Lancashire on 8 August and split at sea on 17 August. She was carrying a cargo described as "stores" and bound for Bône, Algeria. Empire Deed was equipped with anti-torpedo nets. She was in the part of the convoy which formed Convoy KMS 23G, and arrived at Gibraltar on 18 August. She departed from Gibraltar that day as a member of Convoy KMS 23, which arrived at Port Said, Egypt on 30 August. She left the convoy at Bône on 22 August.

Empire Deed departed from Bône on 3 October to join Convoy KMS 27, which had departed from Gibraltar on 29 September and arrived at Port Said on 11 October. She left the convoy at Malta on 6 October, departing two days later for Bari, Italy, where she arrived on 12 October. Empire Deed departed from Bari on 22 October as a member of Convoy HA 5, which arrived at Augusta, Sicily on 24 October. She departed Augusta two days later for Malta, where she arrived on 27 October. Two days later, she departed from Malta as a member of convoy VT 7, which arrived at Tripoli, Libya on 31 October. She departed from Tripoli on 19 November for Augusta, from where she departed on 26 November as a member of Convoy AH 10, which arrived at Brindisi, Italy on 28 November. She departed from Brindisi on 8 December to join Convoy HA 11, which had departed from Bari that day and arrived at Brindisi on 10 December. On 11 December, Empire Deed departed from Brindisi to join Convoy GUS 24, which had departed from Port Said on 6 December and arrived at the Hampton Roads, Virginia, United States on 3 January 1944. She left the convoy at Algiers, Algeria, where she arrived on 15 December.

==== 1944 ====
Empire Deed departed from Algiers on 4 January 1944 to join Convoy UGS 27, which had departed from the Hampton Roads on 15 December 1943 and arrived at Port Said on 11 January. She returned to Algiers, where she arrived the next day. She then joined Convoy KMS 36, which had departed from Gibraltar on 3 January and arrived at Port Said on 13 January. She left the convoy at Augusta, where she arrived on 9 January. She departed the next day as a member of Convoy VN 15, which arrived at Naples, Italy on 11 January. Empire Deed departed from Naples on 1 February as a member of Convoy NV 18, which arrived at Augusta on 2 February. Two days later, she joined Convoy MKS 39, which had departed from Port Said on 30 January and arrived at Gibraltar on 11 February. She left the convoy at Algiers, arriving on 9 February. She departed from Algiers on 19 February to join Convoy MKS 40, which had departed from Port Said on 9 February and arrived at Gibraltar on 21 February. Empire Deed departed from Gibraltar that day as a member of Convoy MKS40G, which rendezvoused with Convoy SL 149 at sea on 22 February. She was carrying three passengers and a cargo of iron ore. The combined convoy arrived at Liverpool on 7 March. She left the convoy at the Belfast Lough on 6 March, departing two days later for Workington, Cumberland, where she arrived on 9 March.

Empire Deed departed from Workington on 14 March for the Clyde, arriving the next day. She departed from the Clyde on 12 April for Loch Ewe, where she arrived on 13 April and joined Convoy WN 570, which arrived at Methil on 14 April. Her voyages for the next three weeks are not recorded, but she sailed from Southend on 9 June as a member of Convoy ETM 4, which arrived at the Seine Bay, France the next day. She spent June and July 1944 sailing between Southend and the Seine Bay, with one call at Portsmouth, Hampshire on 18 July. She made her final voyage in this series as a member of Convoy FTM 44, which departed from the Seine Bay on 21 July and arrived at Southend the next day. Empire Deed departed from Southend on 23 July as a member of Convoy FN 1427, which arrived at Methil on 25 July. She left the convoy at Blyth, Northumberland on 24 July.

Empire Deed departed from Blyth on 17 August for the Tyne, from where she joined Convoy FN 1453, which had departed from Southend on 18 August and arrived at Methil on 20 August. Two days later, she departed with Convoy EN 425, which arrived at Loch Ewe on 24 August. She then joined Convoy ON 250, which had departed from Liverpool that day and arrived at New York, United States on 7 September. She left the convoy at Sydney, Cape Breton, Canada, where she arrived on 4 September. She joined Convoy SQ 91, which departed on 5 September and arrived at Father Point, Quebec on 7 September. On 19 September, Empire Deed departed from the Red Islet as a member of Convoy QS 92, which arrived at Sydney on 22 September. She then joined Convoy HX 310, which had departed from New York on 21 September and arrived at Liverpool on 5 October. She was carrying a cargo of flour. She left the convoy at the Clyde, arriving on 5 October.

Empire Deed departed from the Clyde on 2 November to join Convoy OS94KM, which departed from Liverpool on 3 November and split at sea on 7 November. Her cargo consisted ammunition, toxic stores and vehicles. She was in the part of the convoy that became Convoy KMS 68G, which arrived at Gibraltar on 12 November. She then joined Convoy KMS 68, which departed on 13 November and arrived at Port Said on 24 November. She left the convoy at Augusta, where she arrived on 18 November. She departed the next day as a member of Convoy AH 80, which arrived at Bari on 22 November. Empire Deed departed from Bari on 2 December for Gibraltar, arriving on 7 December. She departed on 13 December for Freetown, Sierra Leone, where she arrived on 22 December, departing six days later for Takoradi, Gold Coast, where she arrived on 31 December.

==== 1945 ====
Empire Deed departed form Takoradi on 5 January 1945 for Casablanca, Morocco, arriving on 17 January. She departed from Casablanca three days later to join Convoy MKS 78G, which departed from Gibraltar on 21 January and arrived at Liverpool on 29 January. She was carrying a cargo of manganese ore. Her destination was Southend, where she arrived on 29 January, departing that day as a member of Convoy FN1617, which arrived at Methil on 31 January. Her destination was Middlesbrough, Yorkshire, where she arrived on 30 January.

Empire Deed departed from Middlesbrough on 14 February for the Tyne, arriving that day and departing three days later to join Convoy FS 1730, which had departed from Methil on 16 February and arrived at Southend on 18 February. She then sailed to The Downs, off the coast of Kent from where she sailed on 21 February to join Convoy ON 286, which departed from Liverpool that day and arrived at New York on 9 March. She left the convoy and sailed to Halifax, Nova Scotia, Canada, arriving on 7 March. She departed three days later as a member of Convoy HF 169, which arrived at Saint John, New Brunswick, Canada on 16 April. She departed from Saint Jon a fortnight later for New York, arriving on 2 May and departing the next day for the Hampton Roads, where she arrived on 5 May.

=== Post war ===
Empire Deed departed from the Hampton Roads on 8 May 1945 as a member of Convoy UGS 91, which dispersed at sea on 23 May. Her destination was Haifa, Palestine, where she arrived on 31 May. She departed from Haifa on 12 June for Port Said and Suez, Egypt, from where she departed on 22 June for Aden, arriving on 28 June and departing that day for Calcutta, India, where she arrived on 21 July. Empire Deed departed from Calcutta on 19 August for Durban, South Africa, where she arrived on 29 September.

In 1946, Empire Deed was sold to the Sussex Steamship Co Ltd and was renamed Deed. She was operated under the management of S G Embiricos Ltd, London. In 1951, Deed was sold to Compagnia Navigazione Doro, Panama and was renamed Doro. In 1956, Doro was sold to Z L Cambanis & others, Piraeus, Greece and was renamed Leonidas Cambanis.

In 1964, Leonidas Cambanis was sold to the Reliance Marine Corporation, Liberia and was renamed Ever Fortune. She was sold later that year to the First Steamship Co Ltd, Taipeh, Taiwan and was renamed Ever Happiness. She served until 1966, and was scrapped in April 1967 at Kaohsiung, Taiwan.
