= Manuel Alonso =

Manuel Alonso may refer to:

- Manuel Alonso Areizaga (1895–1984), Spanish tennis player
- Manuel A. Alonso (1822–1889), Puerto Rican poet
- Manuel Alonso Corral (1934–2011), Spanish antipope
- Manuel Alonso Martínez (1827–1891), Spanish jurist and politician
- Manuel Alonso (cyclist), said in one source to have won the 1989 Vuelta a Murcia; other sources say it was Marino Alonso
