= Paul Mooney (footballer) =

Scottish footballer (1901–1980)

Personal information
- Full name: Paul Mooney
- Date of birth: 7 April 1901
- Place of birth: Chapel, Lanarkshire, Scotland
- Date of death: 19 October 1980 (aged 79)
- Place of death: Brighton, England
- Height: 5 ft 11 in (1.80 m)
- Position: Centre half

Senior career*
Years	Team	Apps	(Gls)
1922–1925	East Stirlingshire	89	(9)
1925–1936	Brighton & Hove Albion	283	(10)
- * Club domestic league appearances and goals

Paul Mooney (7 April 1901 – 19 October 1980) was a Scottish professional footballer who played in the Scottish League for East Stirlingshire and made 283 appearances in the English Football League for Brighton & Hove Albion. He played as a centre half.

== Life and career ==
Mooney was born in Chapel, near Wishaw in Lanarkshire. He worked as a coal miner and played part-time football for East Stirlingshire. He was a regular in their team for two and a half years, and helped them gain promotion from Division Three in 1924. In July 1925, he signed professional forms with Brighton & Hove Albion of the English Third Division South. He soon established himself in the team, and over eleven years with the club made 315 senior appearances, of which 283 were in league competition. He was a defensive centre half, and strong in the air: he was reported to have scored a headed goal from near the halfway line. During a match in 1934 against Gillingham, he was involved in an accidental clash of heads with an opponent, Sim Raleigh, who died the same day. Mooney played little football after the incident. He retired from the professional game in 1936, and ran a pub in Brighton until his death in 1980.
