= Charles Eisenmann (jurist) =

French jurist (1903–1980)

Charles Eisenmann (20 September 1903 – 4 October 1980) was a French jurist of Legal positivism.

He is mainly known for having introduced the thought of Hans Kelsen in France and his contribution to the Legal positivism.

== Biography ==
Having obtained his thesis, he was lecturer University of Caen. After the Agrégation in public law he became professor at University of Strasbourg in place of Carré de Malberg, them at University of Paris and finally Paris 1 Panthéon-Sorbonne University after May 68 crisis.

His legal theory work focuses on Kelsen and positivism: he opposed great jurists of his time such as Hauriou or Duguit. His doctrine has greatly influenced the constitutional development of the French Fifth Republic.
