= Reginald Burton =

English cricketer (1900–1980)

Reginald Henry Markham Burton (23 March 1900 – 19 October 1980) was an English cricketer. He was a right-handed batsman who played for Warwickshire. He was born in Leamington and died in Rugby.

Burton made a single first-class appearance, during the 1919 season, against Worcestershire, at the age of 19. Batting in the middle order, he scored 47 runs in the only innings in which he batted, as the game finished in a draw.

Burton made four Minor Counties Championship appearances between 1931 and 1933.
