= Pat Farnan =

Australian rules footballer

Personal information
- Full name: Patrick Farnan
- Born: 15 July 1893; South Melbourne, Victoria
- Died: 21 October 1980 (aged 87); East Melbourne, Victoria
- Original team: Collingwood District

Playing career^{1}
Years	Club	Games (Goals)
1915	South Melbourne	2 (1)
- ^{1} Playing statistics correct to the end of 1915.

Pat Farnan (15 July 1893 – 21 October 1980) was an Australian rules footballer who played with South Melbourne in the Victorian Football League (VFL).
