= Leonid Ivanov (test pilot) =

Soviet cosmonaut (1950–1980)

- Born: June 25, 1950; Russian Soviet Federative Socialist Republic, Soviet Union
- Died: October 24, 1980 (aged 30); Akhtubinsk, Astrakhan Oblast, Russian Soviet Federative Socialist Republic, Soviet Union
- Occupation: Test pilot
- Space career

Cosmonaut

Leonid Grigoriyevich Ivanov (June 25, 1950 – October 24, 1980) was a member of Soviet Air Force Cosmonaut Training Group 6. He graduated from Higher Air Force School, Kachinsk, in 1971.

Ivanov was killed on 24 October 1980, in the crash of a MiG-27 aircraft during a test flight in Akhtubinsk, Astrakhan Oblast, Russian Soviet Federative Socialist Republic.
