= Gordon Crisp =

Australian rules footballer, born 1910

- Crisp during his Carlton career

Personal information
- Full name: Vincent Gordon Crisp
- Born: 30 April 1910; Wedderburn, Victoria
- Died: 10 October 1980 (aged 70); Brunswick West, Victoria
- Original team: Wedderburn
- Height: 177 cm (5 ft 10 in)
- Weight: 74 kg (163 lb)

Playing career^{1}
Years	Club	Games (Goals)
1936, 1938	Carlton	8 (0)
- ^{1} Playing statistics correct to the end of 1938.

Vincent Gordon Crisp (30 April 1910 – 10 October 1980) was an Australian rules footballer who played with Carlton in the Victorian Football League (VFL).
