= Derek Foster (cricketer) =

English cricketer (1907–1980)

Derek George Foster (19 March 1907 – 13 October 1980) was an English cricketer who played first-class cricket in 52 matches for Warwickshire between 1928 and 1934 and in half a dozen other amateur matches, including four appearances for the Gentlemen. He was born in Sutton Coldfield, Warwickshire and died at Chipping Campden, Gloucestershire.

Educated at Shrewsbury School, Foster was an amateur right-arm fast-medium bowler and a lower-order right-handed batsman. After appearing in three matches for Warwickshire towards the end of the 1928 season, he was given a regular place in 1929 and made an early impact in the match against Glamorgan at Cardiff Arms Park, taking six second-innings wickets for just 11 runs in 11.5 overs as Glamorgan, set 138 to win, were all out for just 40. His success in county matches attracted attention. He was picked for the Gentlemen v Players match at The Oval. And at the end of July he was in a strangely-uneven "England XI" which played Yorkshire in a rain-ruined match at Sheffield. In all first-class matches in 1929, he took 57 wickets but the cost of them, 28.80 runs per wicket, was high by the standards of the time.

In 1930, Foster played just one match for Warwickshire at the start of the season and then was absent for all but the final three games of the season; in that single early game, against Surrey, he took seven first-innings wickets for 42 runs and these were the best bowling figures of his career. He returned to Warwickshire for his second and final full season of cricket in 1931 with similar results to the 1929 season: 53 wickets at an average of 28.28. As in 1929, he was picked for the Gentlemen v Players match, and he also played for the "Gentlemen of England" against the New Zealanders in an end-of-season festival match at Eastbourne where play was possible on only one day out of the three. Against Kent, he took the last seven wickets of the first innings at a cost of 68 runs, his best bowling of the season; in the last county match, against Somerset, he revealed hitherto-hidden batting talent by hitting 70 in less than an hour with five sixes and six fours, though he was dropped before he had scored.

After 1931, however, Foster was pretty much lost to county cricket, playing a single match for Warwickshire in each of the next three seasons, and then not at all. In 1932, his one game was the fixture against Kent, and he took five for 81 and six for 82 to achieve a 10-wicket-match for the only time in his career. That same season he also played for a third time in the Gentlemen v Players fixture at The Oval, a batsmen's feast with 1074 runs scored for the loss of only 18 wickets.
