= Wilfrid Harrison =

Scottish academic (1909–1980)

- Born: May 30, 1909; Glasgow, Scotland
- Died: October 15, 1980 (aged 71)

Academic background
- Education: University of Glasgow; Magdalen College, Oxford

Academic work
- Discipline: Political science
- Institutions: Queen's College, Oxford; University of Liverpool; University of Warwick

Wilfrid Harrison (30 May 1909 – 15 October 1980) was a Scottish academic.

He was born in Glasgow and educated at Hyndland School and Glasgow University, where he obtained an MA with honours in 1931. In 1933 he was awarded a First in PPE from Oxford University and elected Senior Demy of Magdalen College, Oxford. He was appointed lecturer in politics at Queen's College, Oxford in 1935 and in 1939 he was elected Fellow of Queen's College.

After a brief period as Dean of Queen's College, Harrison spent most of the Second World War working for the Ministry of Supply. He returned to Oxford after the war and composed the textbook The Government of Britain, which went through many editions. Harrison also edited an edition of Jeremy Bentham's A Fragment on Government and An Introduction to the Principles of Morals and Legislation, which was his most admired work. In their 1977 edition of A Fragment on Government for The Collected Works of Jeremy Bentham, J. H. Burns and H. L. A. Hart contended that while F. C. Montague (in his 1891 edition) and Harrison both claimed to have based their texts on the first edition, the collation of the various editions proved that they had followed the pirated Dublin edition: "Thus by an ironic chance the text of the pirated edition which Bentham believed had damaged the prospects of his first major publication has been perpetuated in what have probably been the two most widely read editions of the book".

He was the founding editor of the Political Studies Association's journal, Political Studies, which he edited from 1952 until 1963. Harrison was appointed Chair of Political Theory and Institutions at Liverpool University in 1957 before moving to Warwick University in 1964, where he served as Professor of Politics (until 1979) and Pro-Vice-Chancellor (until 1970). He served as first Head of Department for Politics. In 1979 he was awarded an honorary D.Litt by Warwick.

== Works ==
- The Government of Britain (London: Hutchinson, 1948).
- (editor), A Fragment on Government and An Introduction to the Principles of Morals and Legislation (Oxford: Basil Blackwell, 1948).
