= Lawrence Baker (tennis) =

American tennis administrator and player

- Country (sports): United States
- Born: June 18, 1890 Lowndesville, South Carolina, U.S.
- Died: October 14, 1980 (aged 90)

Lawrence Baker (June 18, 1890 – October 14, 1980) was an American tennis administrator and player.

Baker was born in Lowndesville, South Carolina. In 1930 he was chairman of the Chevy Chase Club in Chevy Chase, Maryland, and he was president of the United States Tennis Association from 1948 to 1950. He was captain of the United States team at the 1953 Davis Cup. Baker was general counsel for the United States Tennis Association until 1970. He was inducted into the International Tennis Hall of Fame in the contributor category in 1975.

Baker died in October 1980, at the age of 90.
