= Vincent Mentzel =

Dutch photographer

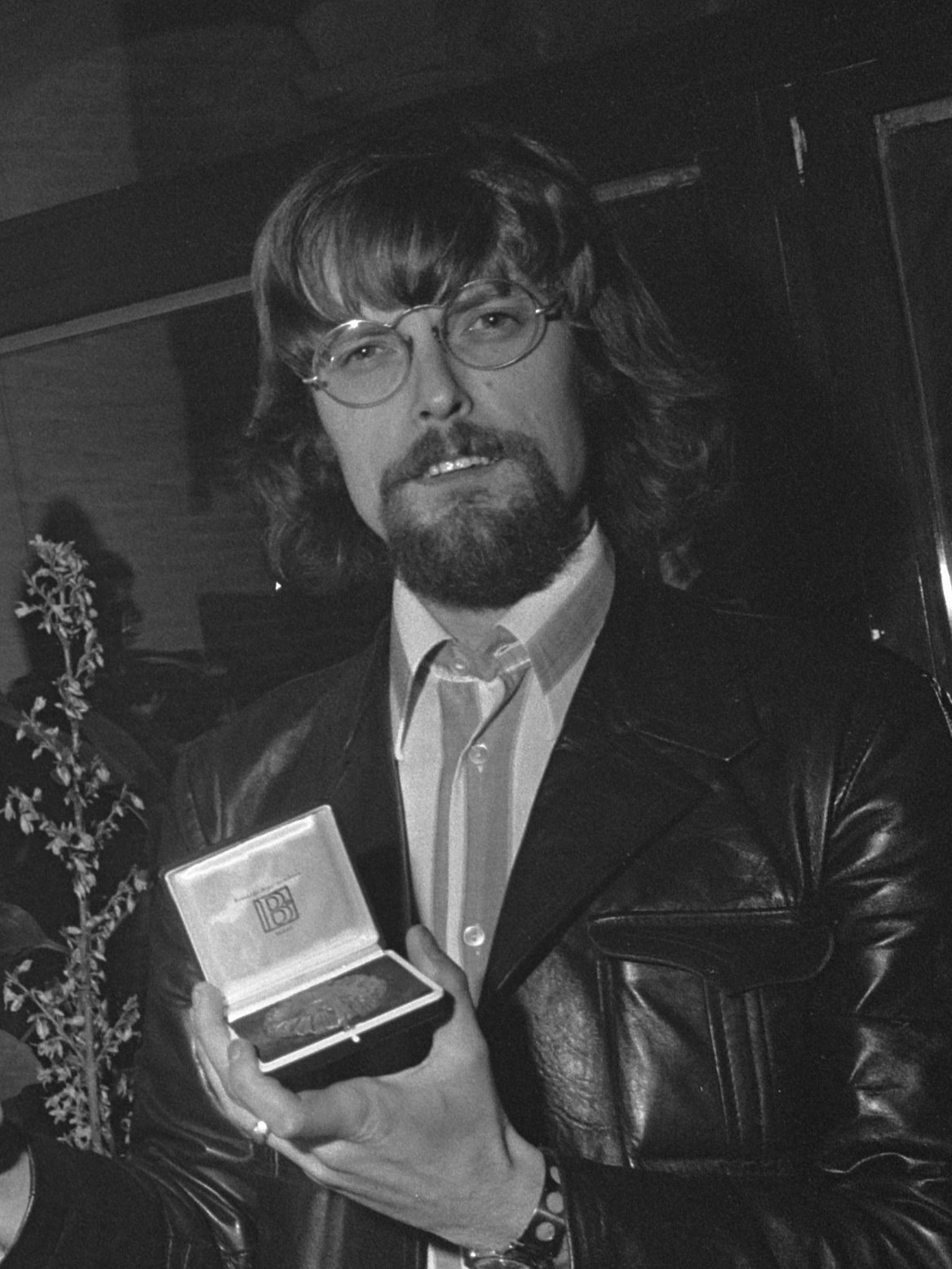
- Vincent Mentzel, 1973
- Born: 28 September 1945; Hoogkarspel, Netherlands
- Known for: Photography, photojournalism
- Awards: World Press Photo, 1977

Vincent Mentzel (born 28 September 1945) is a Dutch photographer, and staff photographer for the Dutch newspaper NRC Handelsblad since 1973. He is known for his photorealism.

== Biography ==
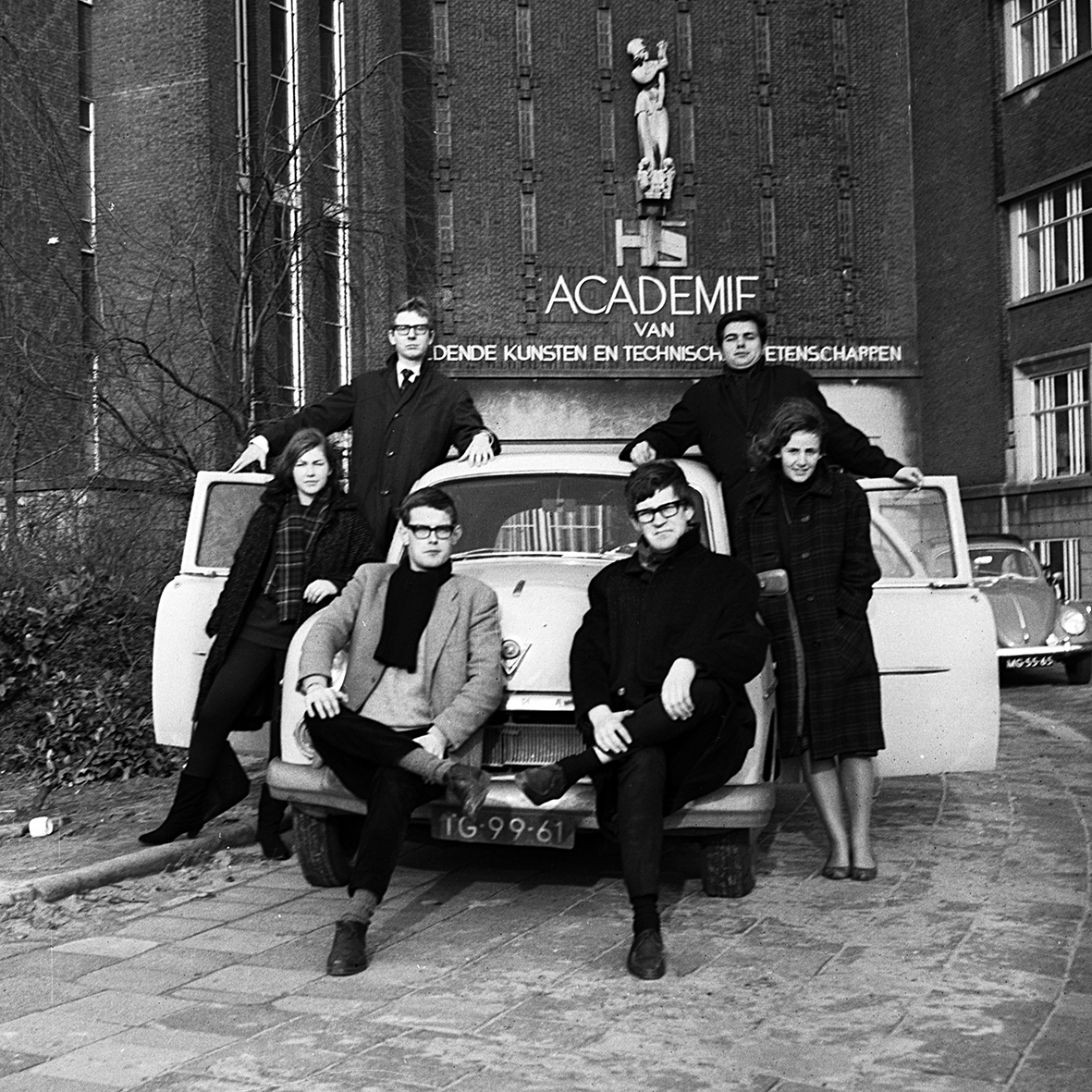
Vincent Mentzel (3rd from left), Rotterdam early 1960s

Born in Hoogkarspel, Mentzel studied at the Academie van Beeldende Kunsten en Technische Wetenschappen (now Willem de Kooning Academy, Rotterdam University of Fine Arts). Afterward he worked in the late 1960s as an assistant to the distinguished Amsterdam theatre photographer Maria Austria. From her he learned darkroom processing and printing techniques.

Mentzel then worked as a freelance photojournalist for national newspapers and magazines. His early photographs are characterized by their narrow perspective, created by heavily printed skies and surroundings. His later work is lighter and more balanced. His use of a wide-angle lens gave his photos an unusual and striking perspective.

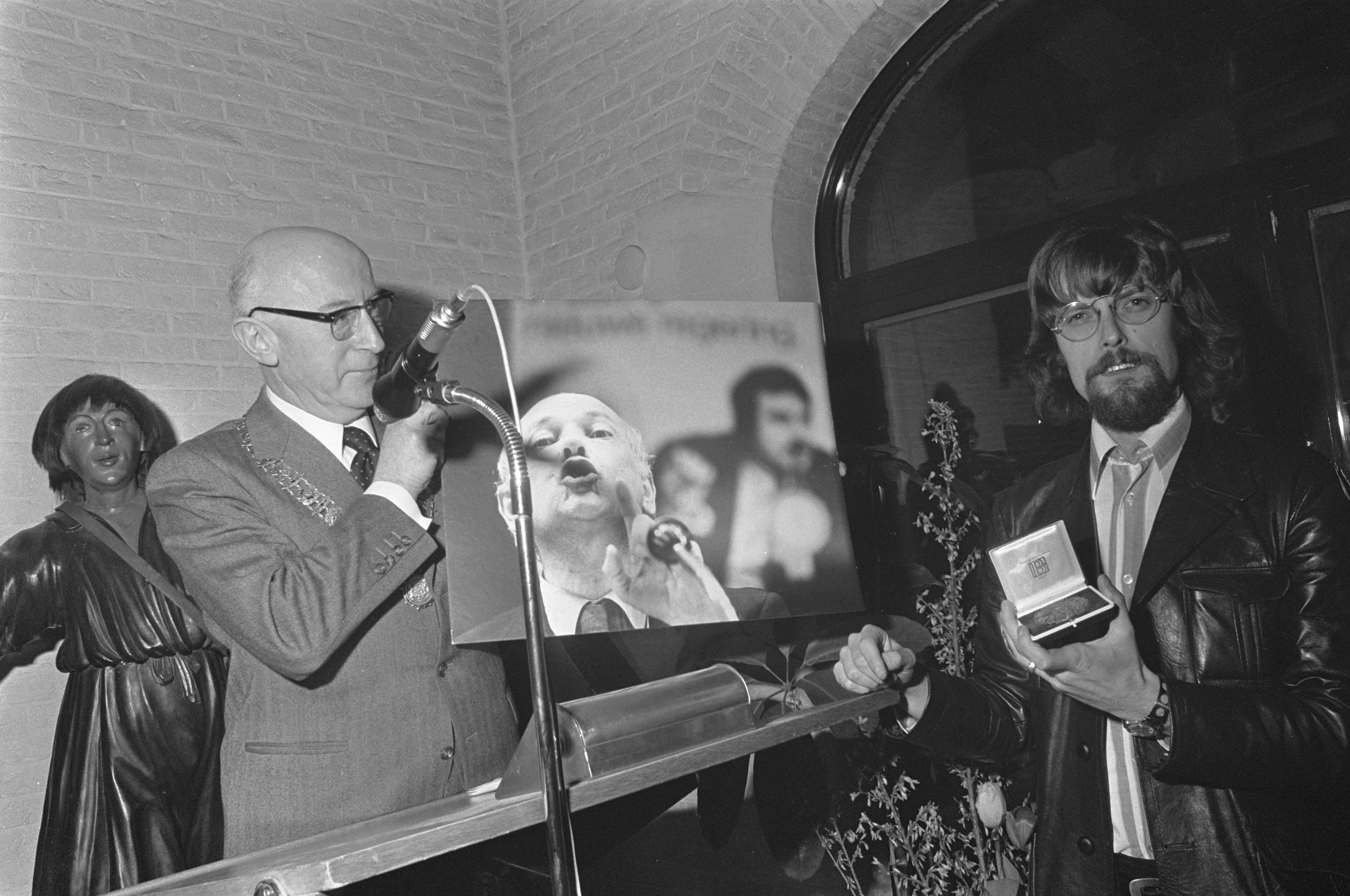
Vincent Mentzel awarded the World Press Photo award, 1973

Since the early 1970s, Vincent Mentzel has been a staff photographer for the major Dutch newspaper NRC Handelsblad and is now one of the best-known Dutch photojournalists. As staff photographer he has played a crucial role in shaping the paper's image. He first distinguished himself as a photographer of important Dutch political personalities and then took on important foreign assignments. He also served as photo editor of M Magazine, NRC's monthly glossy Sunday magazine.

For his work, he has been honored many times with the Silver Camera award (Zilveren Camera) of the Dutch Photojournalists Association (Nederlandse Vereniging of Fotojournalisten (NVF)) and the World Press Photo by the World Press Photo Foundation.

Mentzel was knighted by Queen Beatrix of the Netherlands in 2007 for his contributions to photography. He lives and works in Rotterdam, is married and has a daughter.

== Work ==
Mentzel's photographs have been published in international newspapers and magazines such as Newsweek, Time, Life, and The New York Times. His photographs are included in many museum and private collections around the world. Mentzel's pictures also illustrate many textbooks.

=== Photojournalism career ===
NRC Handelsblad, the leading Dutch daily, quickly hired him. He became widely known for his photographs of politicians and statesmen. Mentzel established personal relationships with eminent politicians in the Dutch parliament and photographed them candidly in their private moments. His approach attracted attention and changed the character of political photography in the Netherlands.

By the 1970s Mentzel had become known as the photographer of the powerful. His photos captured ministers, heads of state, and the Dutch royal family at home and abroad, as well as dictators. His photo of the Dutch prime minister Joop Den Uyl won the 1973 "Best Dutch Press Photo" award from the Amsterdam-based World Press Photo Foundation. However, Mentzel curtailed his work as a political photographer because he felt his friendships with politicians interfered with his journalistic independence.

Even as he expanded his professional horizons, NRC Handelsblad gave Mentzel assignments of wider scope, dispatching him to cover not only extraordinary events and famous names but also ordinary people and places around the world. His first trip to China was during the Cultural Revolution in 1973. He proved skilled at capturing peasant life in China and Tibet, where he was one of the first to be allowed to enter. He also photographed street scenes in Tokyo, ordinary people in the southern United States, and kings and prime ministers.

Among the stories he covered were the Nieuwmarkt riots in Amsterdam, the guerrilla warfare of the Provisional Irish Republican Army, the 1989 Tiananmen Square protests, and the 1982 Lebanon War These assignments firmly established his stature as a widely acclaimed photojournalist.

And that is how Mentzel views himself and his calling: "I'm not an artist," he insists, despite the fact that many view his work as representative of true photographic art. "A newspaper is not an art magazine, or a picture book to be kept and treasured. It's something people look at, read, and then throw away. They shouldn't have to puzzle over what a newspaper photo is about. It's fine for a newspaper photo to be striking or beautiful, but its basic job, its reason for being, is to convey information. That's what photojournalism is about."

=== Later work ===
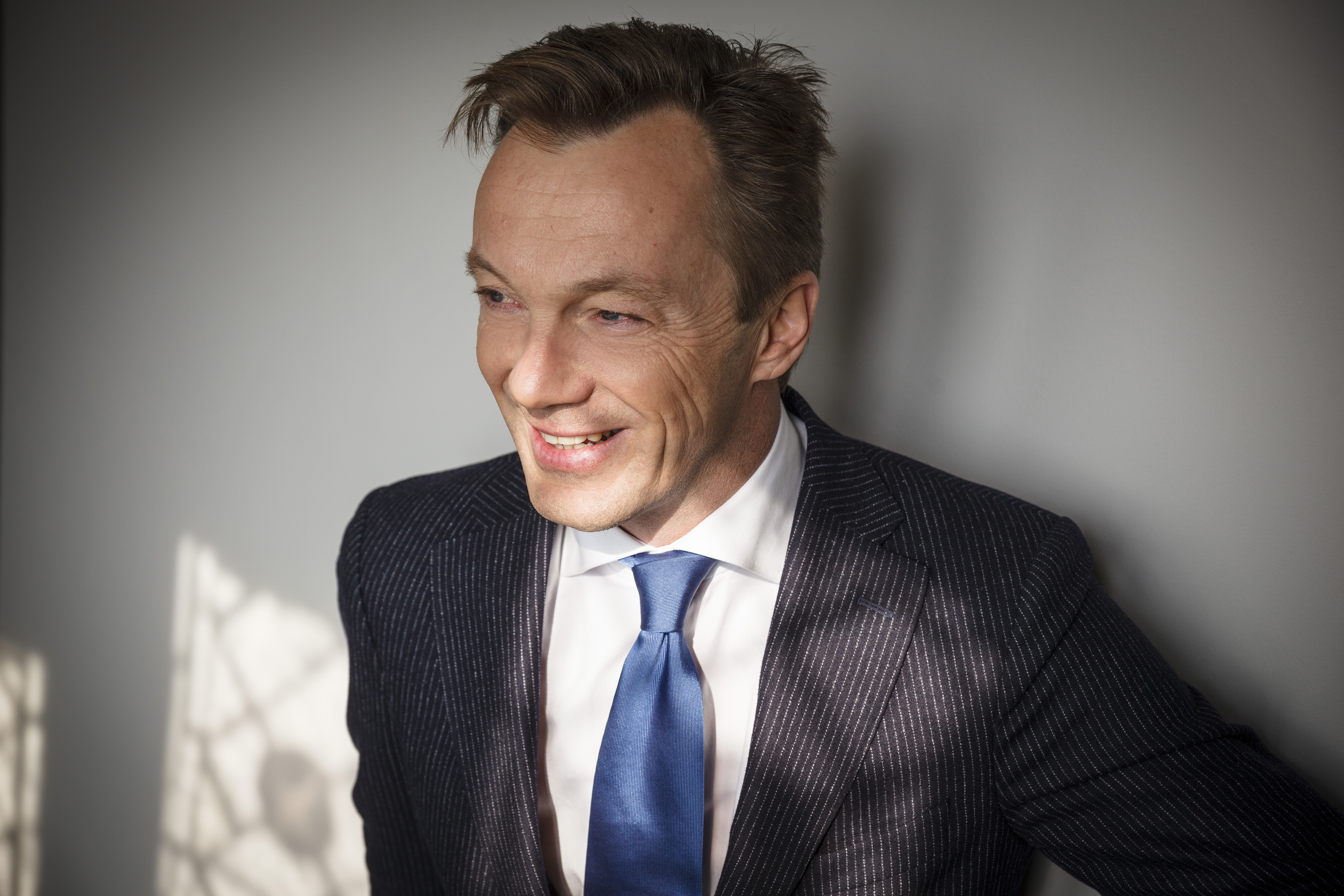
Wim Pijbes (2013)

Vincent Mentzel has consistently shared his knowledge, skills, and support through professional and educational organizations in the field. He serves as a jury member on many international photo contests. He has been a member of the executive board of the World Press Photo Foundation for more than two decades, and a board member of the Rotterdam Art Foundation (Rotterdamse Kunststichting) for a number of years. He is a member of the Advisory Board of the W. Eugene Smith Memorial Fund (New York) and was a board member of the Anna Cornelis foundation, which makes grants to aid photographers on important projects from 1996 to 2006. Since 2000 he has been a board member of the Amsterdam Photography Museum (Foam Fotografiemuseum Amsterdam), which he helped to found.

== Selected bibliography ==
- Suriname (1975, text by J.F. van den Broek)
- China (Rotterdamse Kunststichting) (text by Peter Schumacher) (1978)
- De paus van Polen: Reis van een politieke pelgrim (The Pope from Poland: The Visit of a Political Pilgrim) (1983) (text by H. van Rhijn)
- Foto Vincent Mentzel (1984) (text by Friso Endt)
- Stadslicht (Citylights) (1984) (poems by Jules Deelder)
- Alexander (1985) (profile of Prince Willem Alexander at his 18th birthday) (text by Renate Rubinstein)
- Roomse Heisa (1985) (Roman Trouble; an account of Pope John Paul II's visit to the Netherlands) (text by Gerard Reve)
- Vietnam bestaat nog (1988) (Vietnam Still Lives) (text by A. Claassen)
- Hemelse vrede, De lente van Peking (1989) (Heavenly Peace, The Peking Spring)
- Vakwerk (1992) (Framed Creativity) (text by Sylvia Tóth)
- Het tijdperk Lubbers 1982–1994 (1994) (The era of Ruud Lubbers, prime minister of the Netherlands, text by M. Kranenburg)
- Slager Crolus koopt een oude viool (The butcher Crolus buys an old violin: photos of leading conductors, a special limited edition for JBR management consultants in the Netherlands) (1997) (text by Gerard Reve)
- Onderweg, In de auto met bekende ondernemers (1999) (On the road with Dutch entrepreneurs) (text by J. Koelewijn)
- Een huis dat zingt (2005) (A House That Sings, profile of Edward James, patron of Salvador Dalí and René Magritte, text by Gerrit Komrij, Rob Bartlema & Arjen Ribbens)
- De mens achter de luchthaven (2006) (The People Behind the Airport; a photo essay on the 50th anniversary of Rotterdam airport) (text by Henk Hofland)
- Foto Vincent Mentzel (2011) (text Geert Mak & Henk Hofland)
- Vincent Mentzel foto's (2021) (text Mattie Boom, Nicole Robbers, Arnon Grunberg & Birgit Donker)

== Special commissions and assignments ==
- Portrait of Her Majesty Queen Beatrix specially photographed and used on the Dutch "permanent stamp" since 1980
- Photograph of the Noordeinde royal palace for use on the Dutch stamp, with designer Kees Nieuwenhuijzen
- Photograph of Her Majesty Queen Beatrix for use on the 50-guilder coin and also all Dutch coins
- Annual reports for major Dutch companies and organizations, including KLM, Robeco, Goudse Vezekeringen insurance company, ABN bank, NCM re-insurance company, and the Prince Claus chair (scholarship)

== Awards ==
- World Press Photo, Beste Nederlandse Persfoto (1973) (Best Dutch Press Photo)
- Pictures of the Year, honorable mention, University of Missouri, USA (1974)
- De Zilveren Camera, Wissel Trofee (1975) Silver Camera Award, first prize
- World Press Photo, first prize in News Features (1978)
- De Zilveren Camera, Wissel Trofee (1981) Silver Camera Award, first prize
- World Press Photo, honorable mention, "People in the News" (1982)
- International Organisation of Journalists, Master of Press Photography (1983)
- Impact (Dutch) portrait prize (2006)
- De Grote Paul (2007) The "Great Paul" Award based on nominations by leading Dutch photographers. It is named after the Dutch photographer Paul Huf.
- Ridder in de Orde van de Nederlandse Leeuw (2007) Knight of the Order of the Lion of the Netherlands by Queen Beatrix for services to photography.

== Selected museum and gallery exhibitions ==
- Dordrecht, the Netherlands. One-man show, Dordrechts Museum (1973)
- Columbia, USA. "Pictures of the year." Group exhibition at the University of Missouri School of Journalism (1974)
- Amsterdam. One-man show, Fotogalerie FIOLET (1974)

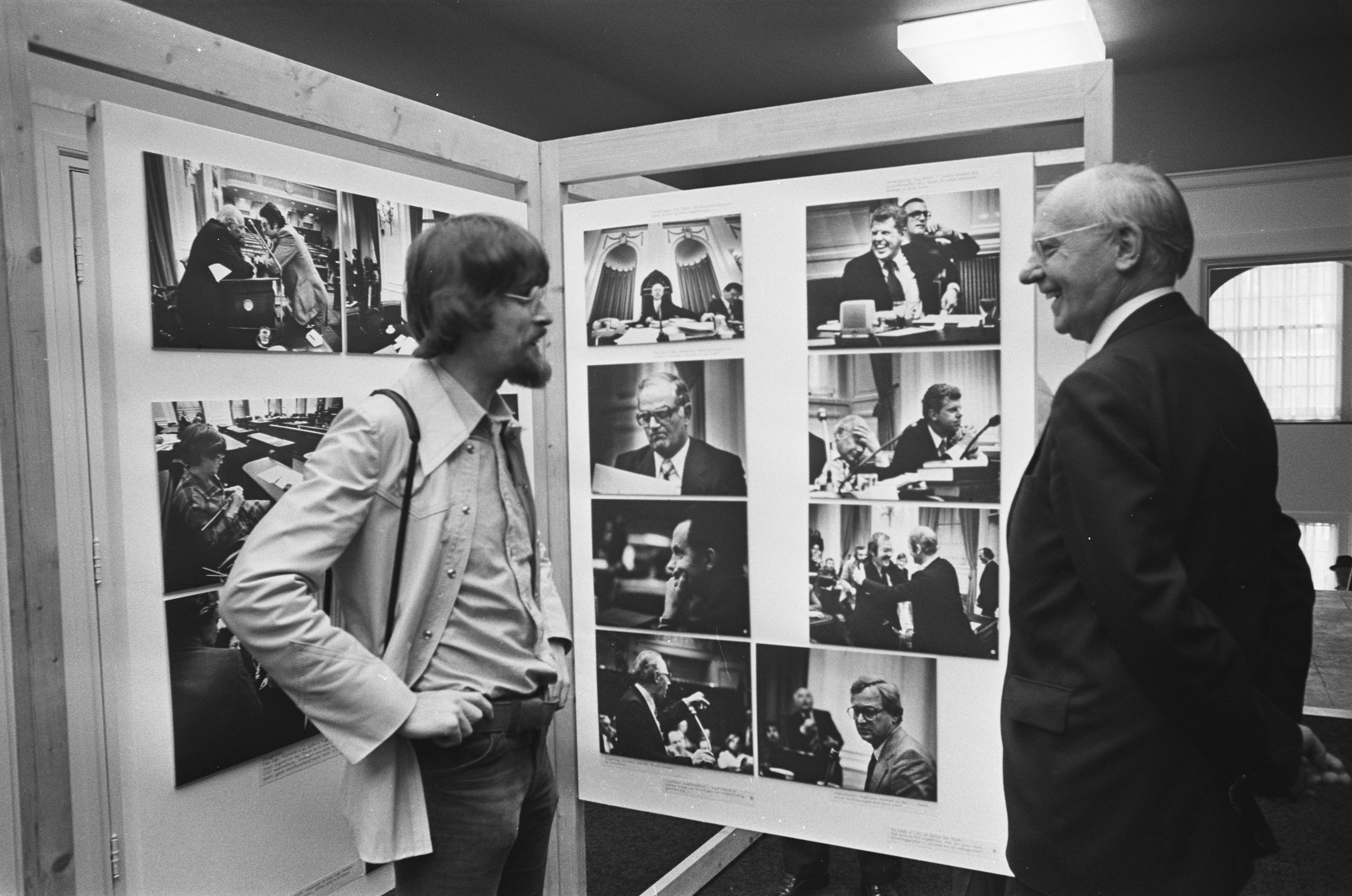
Mentzel and Anne Vondeling at exhibition in Parliament building in The Hague, early 1977

- Den Haag (The Hague), the Netherlands. One-man show, "Political Photography" in the Parliament building (Second Chamber of the House) and in several ministries (1976)
- Rotterdam, the Netherlands. One-man show on China, Museum Boijmans van Beuningen (1978)
- Amsterdam, the Netherlands. Group show, Stedelijk Museum (1978)
- Rotterdam, the Netherlands. "China" group show, Museum Boijmans van Beuningen. (1984)
- Rotterdam, the Netherlands. Canon photography gallery (1987)
- Beijing, China. World Press Photo, "Holland Special" (1988)
- Budapest, Hungary. Group show, Castle Museum (1989)
- Rotterdam, the Netherlands. One-man show, Galerie Delta (1994)
- Amsterdam, the Netherlands. One-man show, De Rode Hoed, performance center (1995)
- Amsterdam, the Netherlands. The Royal Group Show: The Queen's Selection of Art Stedelijk Museum (1998)
- Breda, the Netherlands. "China," One-man show, Museum de Beyerd (1998)
- Amsterdam, the Netherlands. One-man show on China, Sino House (1998)
- Naarden, the Netherlands. Group show, "99 years of Dutch photography," Fotofestival-Naarden (1999)
- Amsterdam, the Netherlands. De Nieuwe Kerk (The New Church, built 1414). Group show, "Jongens van Jan de Witt" (Photos of leading Dutch statesmen) (2001)
- Rotterdam, the Netherlands. Photos of the life of the surrealist poet and self-styled architect and arts patron Edward James, living in the house he designed and built in the jungle of Xilitla, Mexico; he was the patron of Salvador Dalí & René Magritte. Museum Boijmans van Beuningen (2005)
- Rotterdam, the Netherlands. "The people behind the airport," celebrating 50 years of Rotterdam Airport. Kunsthal (Art Hall) (2006)
- Kats, the Netherlands. Open-air exhibition of large-scale photos of Mongolia, at De Zeeuwse Rozentuin (with painter/sculptor Klaas Gubbels, 2007)
- Naarden, the Netherlands. One-man show at the award ceremony of the "De Grote Paul" (Great Paul) prize honoring the famous photographer Paul Huf (2007)
- The Hague, Scheveningen, the Netherlands. One-man show, "Pictures for the Newspaper" Museum Beelden aan Zee (2009)
- Rotterdam, One-man show, "The Netherlands in Focus" Kunsthal (2011)
- Hilversum, One-man show, "Vincent Mentzel."Photographer of the Power" Museum Hilversum (2021-2022)
- Amsterdam, One-man show, "Vincent Mentzel" Rijksmuseum (2022)
