= Jack Deed =

English cricketer

Personal information
- Full name: John Arthur Deed
- Born: 12 September 1901; Sevenoaks, Kent
- Died: 19 October 1980 (aged 79); Ide Hill, Kent
- Batting: Right-handed

Domestic team information
- Years: Team
- 1924–1930: Kent
- First-class debut: 28 May 1924 Kent v Lancashire
- Last First-class: 26 July 1930 Kent v Surrey

Career statistics
Competition	First-class
Matches	62
Runs scored	1,863
Batting average	22.71
100s/50s	2/5
Top score	133
Catches/stumpings	16/–
- Source: CricInfo, 21 May 2017

John Arthur Deed (12 September 1901 – 19 October 1980) was an English amateur cricketer who played for Kent County Cricket Club between 1924 and 1930. He was born in Sevenoaks in Kent in 1901.

== Early life and education ==
Deed was educated at Malvern College where he played cricket for the school XI for two years. Deed was not a natural cricketer and his school cricket was described in his Wisden obituary as "wholly undistinguished". He also played rackets at school, winning the Public Schools' rackets pairs competition at Queen's Club with Clayton Robson in 1920. Academically he won the prize for Mathematics and was a senior prefect and head of house at Malvern before going up to Pembroke College, Cambridge where he read Maths, graduating in 1923.

== Sporting career ==
Having not played cricket for Cambridge, Deed first appeared for the Kent Second XI in 1924. After scoring 252 against Surrey Second XI at The Oval, he made his first-class cricket debut of in the First XI later the same season against Lancashire at Old Trafford. Deed played for the First XI between 1924 and 1930, often adding batting depth in the early season when more of Kent's amateur players were unavailable. He played more regularly in 1926, 1928 and 1930, scoring 1,863 runs for the county at an average of 22.71, adding solidity to Kent's batting – Wisden says that "Deed's steadiness was often valuable". He was awarded his Kent cap in 1928.

Deed scored two centuries for Kent, both against Warwickshire at Edgbaston, with his highest score of 133 being made in his final season. The innings lasted over three hours and was described as "very painstaking" and Deed was never considered a fluent, attacking players. He played his final first-class match in July 1930 against Surrey at The Oval. He toured Egypt with HM Martineau's XI in 1937, playing a number of minor matches on the tour, including against Egypt. He served on theKent committee between 1953 and 1973 and was president in 1965.

Away from cricket, Deed was also a squash player. He played for Kent and was a member of the Kent squash committee between 1932 and 1959. He was Honorary Treasurer of Old Malverian Football Club between 1930 and 1946 and managed the team for a time.

== Professional career and later life ==
Deed was a chartered accountant. He was a partner in the firm Evans, Fripp, Deed & Co. in London and a director of John S Deed & Sons and Rollins & Sons.

He was a freemason and the Worshipful Master of Old Malverian Lodge between 1951 and 1971. Deed was also on the Malvern College Council between 1945 and 1980. He died at Ide Hill near Sevenoaks in 1980 aged 79.

== Bibliography ==
- Carlaw, Derek (2020). Kent County Cricketers, A to Z: Part Two (1919–1939) (PDF). Cardiff: ACS.
