= Pedro Suinaga =

Mexican footballer (1907–1980)

Personal information
- Date of birth: 5 April 1907
- Date of death: 1 October 1980 (aged 73)
- Position: Midfielder

Senior career*
Years	Team	Apps	(Gls)
- Club América

International career
1928	Mexico Olympic	2	(0)
- * Club domestic league appearances and goals

Pedro Suinaga (5 April 1907 – 1 October 1980) was a Mexican footballer who represented his nation at the 1928 Summer Olympics in the Netherlands.
