= Frederick Dobson (cricketer) =

English cricketer

Frederick Dobson (12 October 1898 – 15 October 1980) was an English first-class cricketer who played in three matches for Warwickshire in the 1928 season. He was born at Olton, Solihull, West Midlands (then Warwickshire) and died at Burley, Hampshire.

Dobson is recorded as a right-handed lower order batsman and a slow left-arm spin bowler, though in his first-class matches he was first change bowler and in his limited second eleven matches for Warwickshire in 1931 he appears to have opened the bowling. He made little impression in his three games at the start of the 1928 season; his best bowling was an analysis of three for 51 in the match against Somerset.
