= David B. Todd Jr. =

American surgeon (1931–1980)

- Born: David Bernard Todd Jr. March 22, 1931; Jefferson County, Alabama, U.S.
- Died: October 21, 1980 (aged 49); Nashville, Tennessee, U.S.
- Resting place: Greenwood Cemetery
- Education: Morehouse College; Meharry Medical College; University of Minnesota
- Occupation: Surgeon
- Employer: Meharry Medical College
- Spouse: Loraine LeShore
- Children: 1 son, 3 daughters

David Bernard Todd Jr. (March 22, 1931 – October 21, 1980) was an American surgeon. He was a professor of surgery at Meharry Medical College, and the first African-American cardiovascular surgeon in Nashville, Tennessee. He is the namesake of Dr DB Todd Jr. Boulevard in North Nashville.

== Early life ==
Todd was born in 1931 in Jefferson County, Alabama. He graduated from Morehouse College, where he earned a bachelor's degree, followed by an MD from Meharry Medical College in 1956. He attended the University of Minnesota, where he earned a PhD in 1966.

== Career ==
Todd began his career as an assistant professor of surgery at Meharry Medical College in 1966. He was also the director of the thoracic and cardiovascular divisions at Meharry. He became associate professor of surgery in 1969, and full professor in 1979.

Todd was a physician at Hubbard Hospital on the Meharry campus, now known as Nashville General Hospital. According to The Tennessean, he was the "first black cardiovascular surgeon in Nashville," and he "headed the team that performed the first open heart surgery at Meharry in 1972."

Todd was a fellow of the American College of Chest Physicians, the American Geriatrics Society, and the American College of Surgeons. He served as the chair of the surgical division of the National Medical Association.

== Personal life, death and legacy ==
With his wife, née Loraine LeShore, Todd had a son and three daughters. They resided in Bordeaux, a neighborhood of Nashville.

Todd died on October 21, 1980, at the Riverside Hospital in Nashville, at age 48. His funeral was held at First Baptist Church, Capitol Hill, and he was buried in Greenwood Cemetery. Dr DB Todd Jr. Boulevard, between Charlotte Avenue and Clarksville Pike, was named in his honor in 1982.
