= Hell Is for Heroes (film) =

1962 film by Don Siegel

- Theatrical release poster
- Directed by: Donald Siegel
- Written by: Richard Carr & Robert Pirosh
- Produced by: Henry Blanke
- Starring: Steve McQueen; Bobby Darin; Fess Parker; James Coburn; Bob Newhart; Nick Adams
- Cinematography: Harold Lipstein
- Edited by: Howard A. Smith
- Music by: Leonard Rosenman
- Distributed by: Paramount Pictures
- Release date: June 26, 1962
- Running time: 90 minutes
- Country: United States
- Language: English
- Box office: $1.4 million (US/Canada)

Hell Is for Heroes is a 1962 American war film directed by Donald Siegel and starring Steve McQueen. It tells the story of a squad of U.S. soldiers from the 95th Infantry Division who, in the fall of 1944, must hold off an entire German company for approximately 48 hours along the Siegfried Line until reinforcements reach them.

== Plot ==
At Montigny, Meurthe-et-Moselle in 1944, infantry squad leader Sergeant Larkin is resting with his men after weeks at the front. A replacement named Private John Reese has been assigned to the platoon. Reese, a former master sergeant and Distinguished Service Cross recipient, was demoted after a court-martial. Reese, a troubled loner, fits in poorly. While the squad happily discuss furloughs and returning home, Reese is saddened by being away from the fighting. The company commander, Captain Loomis, worries that Reese acts irresponsibly when out of combat but Pike, the platoon sergeant, knows Reese and insists he is reliable under fire.

The 2nd Squad includes a con-man and scavenger named Corby, a skilled mechanic named Corporal Henshaw, an easy-going naïf named Cumberly and family man Kolinsky. The squad's mascot is a young Polish displaced person Homer Janeczek hoping to accompany the men back to the United States. When the squad returns to the front, an unannounced withdrawal by the rest of the company leaves them spread dangerously thin. Knowing that German reconnaissance will reveal how weak their defenses are, they carry out a deception plan. The company clerk, Private First Class James Driscoll, drives his Jeep behind their line, rigging it to sound like a tank, then improvises misleading radio messages for a hidden microphone left by the Germans in an abandoned pillbox. The squad also uses makeshift rattles in the trees to convince the Germans they have a much larger force conducting regular patrols.

Cumberly is killed in a German raid, but Reese kills three of the Germans in close combat. Worried the survivors will report how weak their positions are, Reese recommends attacking a large German pillbox flanked by a minefield and barbed wire. Larkin is unable to locate Pike to obtain permission, and argues with Reese about sending a man for satchel charges. When Larkin is killed by an artillery barrage Reese proceeds without orders, taking Henshaw and Kolinsky. Shortly after they set out, Sergeant Pike and the rest of the company begin to return to the line.

During the attack, Henshaw sets off an S-mine and is killed by the detonation of his flamethrower tanks. Reese and Kolinsky retreat, covered by smoke from the company mortar squad, but Kolinsky is struck by shrapnel, and dies as his wounds are treated.

A furious Captain Loomis threatens Reese with a court-martial for defying orders, then orders a dawn attack. They suffer heavy casualties from a German pillbox until Reese and Corby get close enough to use a flamethrower and satchel charges. Reese is wounded and his satchel charge is tossed back out of the bunker by the defenders. Reese retrieves it and carries it back through the pillbox opening, blowing up the fortification's occupants and himself. Pike orders Corby to burn the bunker with his flamethrower and the Americans continue the advance.

== Cast ==
- Steve McQueen as Private John Reese
- Bobby Darin as Private Dave Corby
- Fess Parker as Technical Sergeant Bill Pike
- Harry Guardino as Sergeant Jim Larkin
- Bob Newhart as Private First Class James E. Driscoll
- James Coburn as Corporal Frank Henshaw
- Nick Adams as Homer Janeczek
- Mike Kellin as Private Stan Kolinsky
- Bill Mullikin as Private Joe Cumberly
- Joseph Hoover as Captain Roger Loomis
- L.Q. Jones as Supply Sergeant Frazer
- Michele Montau as Monique Ouidel
- Don Haggerty as Captain Mace

== Production ==
Writer Robert Pirosh was a former master sergeant with the 35th Infantry Division in World War II. He gained a reputation after writing the script for the 1949 film Battleground, about the American 101st Airborne Division paratroopers’ defense of Bastogne, then writing and directing Go for Broke!, a 1951 war film about the famed 442nd Regimental Combat Team. Soon after Hell Is for Heroes, he created the World War II TV series Combat!. Pirosh based some of the events in his film on his unit being withdrawn from the Vosges area to move towards the Battle of the Bulge, with their former positions in the line held by a small force in a then-classified deception operation. Pirosh based Nick Adams' Polish character on an actual displaced person who followed his unit around.

Originally, Pirosh was also to have directed and produced the film, but he walked away from the project after trouble with McQueen. Pirosh's screenplay was originally entitled Separation Hill, but the title was changed by Paramount's publicity office as being too close to the 1959 Korean War film Pork Chop Hill (which Harry Guardino had been in).

Many of the cast were angry over the studio's budget restrictions, which resulted in phony-looking props, malfunctioning firearms and the same German having to be killed three or four times. In the last battle scene, McQueen can be seen experiencing multiple failures firing the M3 Grease Gun. These malfunctions were due to problems with the blanks used.

McQueen was reportedly furious with his agent for having induced him to sign onto the film and not securing up front the fee that he had been promised, and for passing on another movie he wanted. Thus, his angry, detached appearance might not have been entirely due to his method acting. Columnist James Bacon visited the set and said that "Steve McQueen is his own worst enemy". Bobby Darin overheard the remark and replied, "Not while I'm still alive." Bob Newhart said he had been offered the film the previous year and noticed the script had changed when Steve McQueen came on board; Newhart believed the original script had been set to feature Darin as the main star of the film.

McQueen and Siegel were continuously at odds during the production, with the two nearly coming to blows several times. In one scene, when McQueen was unable to cry while on camera, Siegel resorted to slapping him hard and blowing onion juice into his face, before administering eye drops that ran down the actor's face.

Parker, Coburn and others in the cast were working on other projects during the making of the film and would repeatedly show up in the nick of time to do their lines without makeup and little or no rehearsal. It was one of a string of quality support parts Coburn appeared in around this time.

Due to the intense heat of the 1961 summer in Cottonwood and Redding, California, many of the scenes were shot at night for the comfort of the actors.

During the production, Newhart's comedy albums were selling unexpectedly well, resulting in higher fee offers for stand-up comedy nightclub appearances. As a result, he sought ways to have his character killed off so that he could leave the production. The director consistently told him that he would be in the film until the end.

Both Newhart and Parker recalled that the film ended abruptly due to Paramount shortening the production of the film for financial reasons.

A novelization of the screenplay was written by Curt Anders.

== Theme ==
Biographer Judith M. Kass commented on the film's central protagonist Reese (Steve McQueen). His homicidal tendencies find an outlet in combat and establishes a measure of camaraderie with his fellow soldiers.

In Hell Is for Heroes Don Siegel delineated the most futile of man’s occupations and the kind of person who flourished in this milieu. Steve McQueen is a psychopath, licensed to kill in the Second World War. In this situation he can unleash his natural anti-social instincts. McQueen can’t exist as a normal human being outside the war and its opportunities for regimented murder, but he loses his life at the moment of his triumph.

Kass also noted that Seigel offered no social context that located the origins of McQueen's psychotic behavior: "No attempt is made to explain his behavior in terms of either an unjust society or a cruel environment."

== Star Trek: Deep Space Nine ==
Several of the guest characters in the Star Trek: Deep Space Nine episode "The Siege of AR-558" are named after characters and actors from this film. These include Patrick Kilpatrick's character Reese, Annette Helde's character Larkin and Bill Mumy's character Kellin (named after the actor Mike Kellin). Unseen characters named after characters from the film include Captain Loomis and Commander Parker. The episode has a similar plot, where Starfleet troops have been holding off repeated attacks from enemy forces for five months.

== See also ==
- List of American films of 1962

== Sources ==
- Kass, Judith M. (1975). Don Seigel: The Hollywood Professionals, Volume 4 (1975 ed.). New York: Tanvity Press. p. 207. ISBN 0-498-01665-X.
