= 22nd Academy Awards =

- Date: March 23, 1950
- Site: RKO Pantages Theatre, Hollywood, California
- Hosted by: Paul Douglas

Highlights
- Best Picture: All the King's Men
- Most awards: The Heiress (4)
- Most nominations: The Heiress (8)

The 22nd Academy Awards were held on March 23, 1950, at the RKO Pantages Theatre, honoring the films in 1949. This was the final year in which all five Best Picture nominees were in Black & White, and the first year in which every film nominated for Best Picture won multiple Oscars.

All the King's Men became the first of two films to date to win Best Picture and two acting Oscars, yet lose Best Director (the other being Shakespeare in Love (1998)). This year marked the only occasion to date of two films each receiving two acting nominations within the same category: both Pinky and Come to the Stable received two nominations for Best Supporting Actress (Ethel Barrymore and Ethel Waters, and Celeste Holm and Elsa Lanchester, respectively). A Chance to Live and So Much for So Little's joint win in the Best Documentary (Short Subject) category marked the second occurrence of a tie in Oscar history.

== Winners and nominees ==
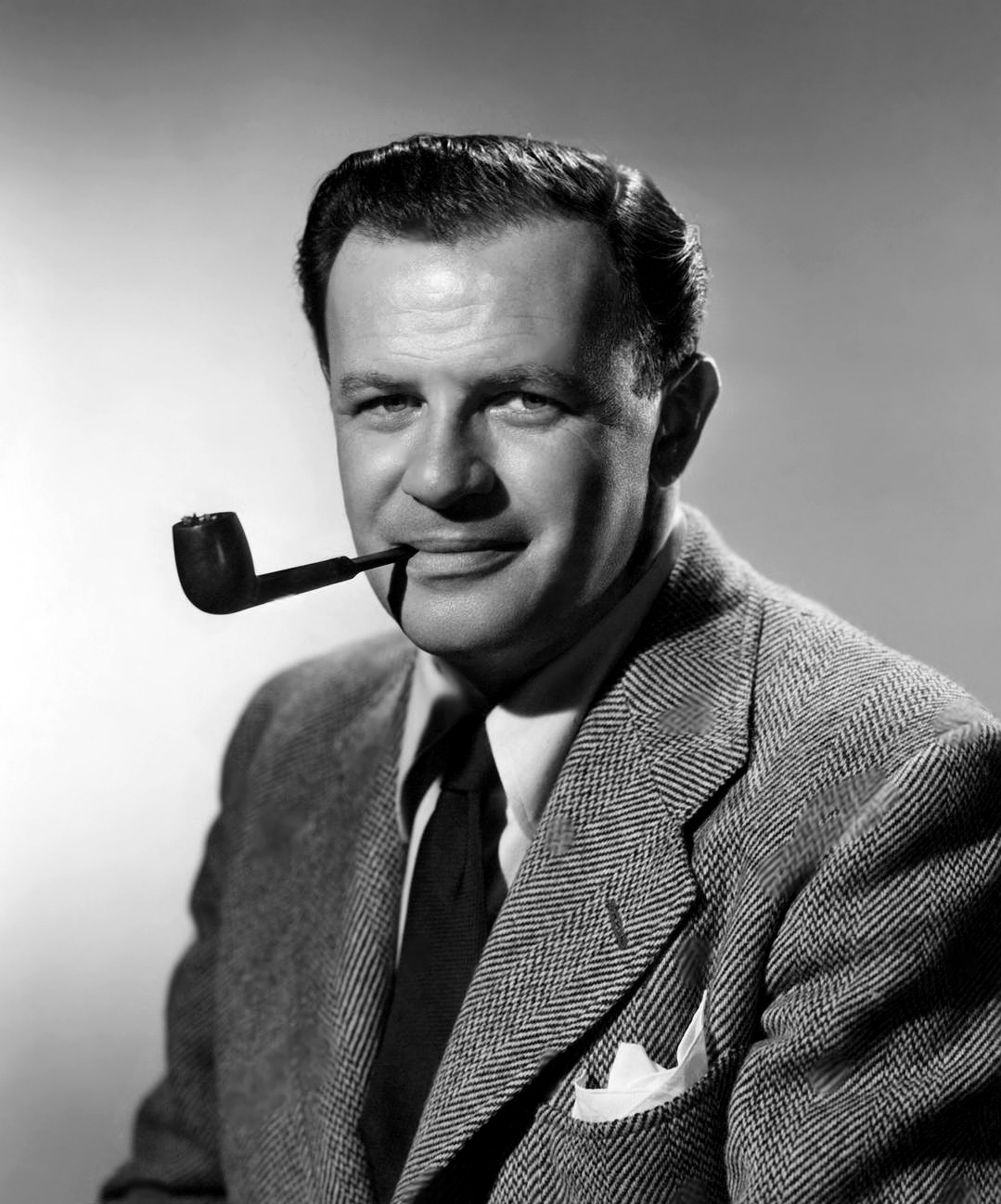
Joseph L. Mankiewicz; Best Director and Best Screenplay winner

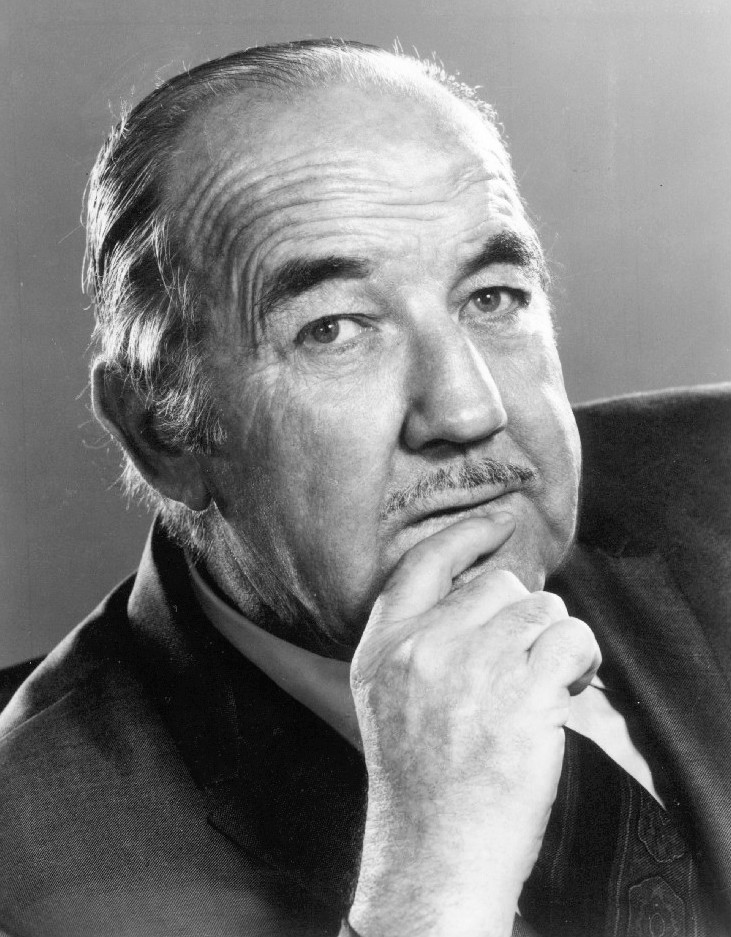
Broderick Crawford; Best Actor winner

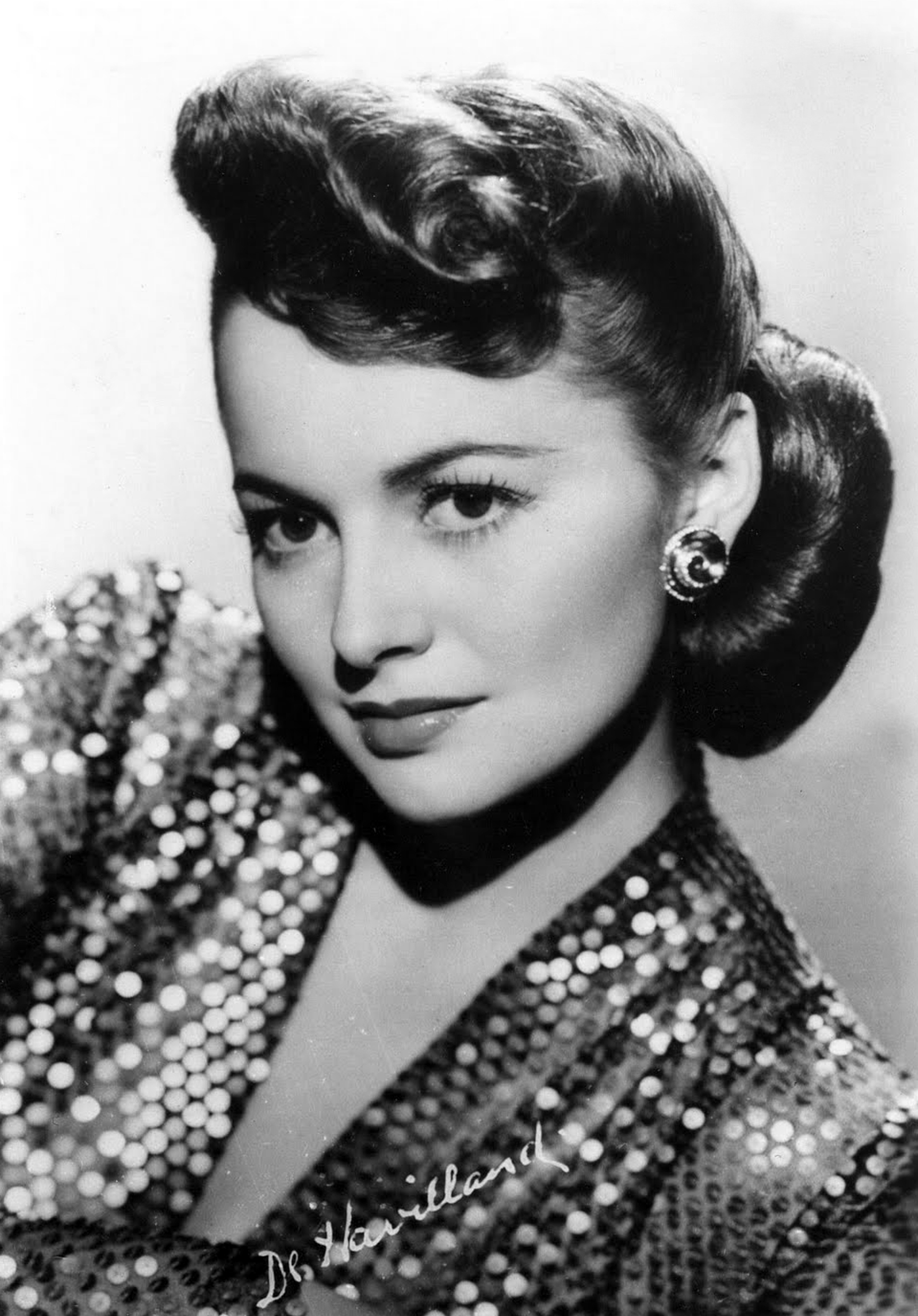
Olivia de Havilland; Best Actress winner

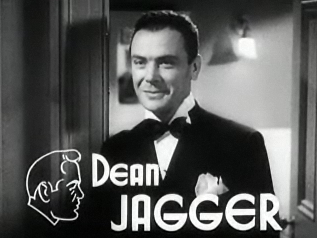
Dean Jagger; Best Supporting Actor winner

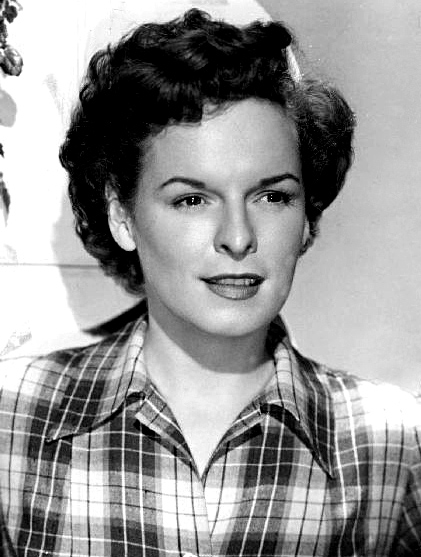
Mercedes McCambridge; Best Supporting Actress winner

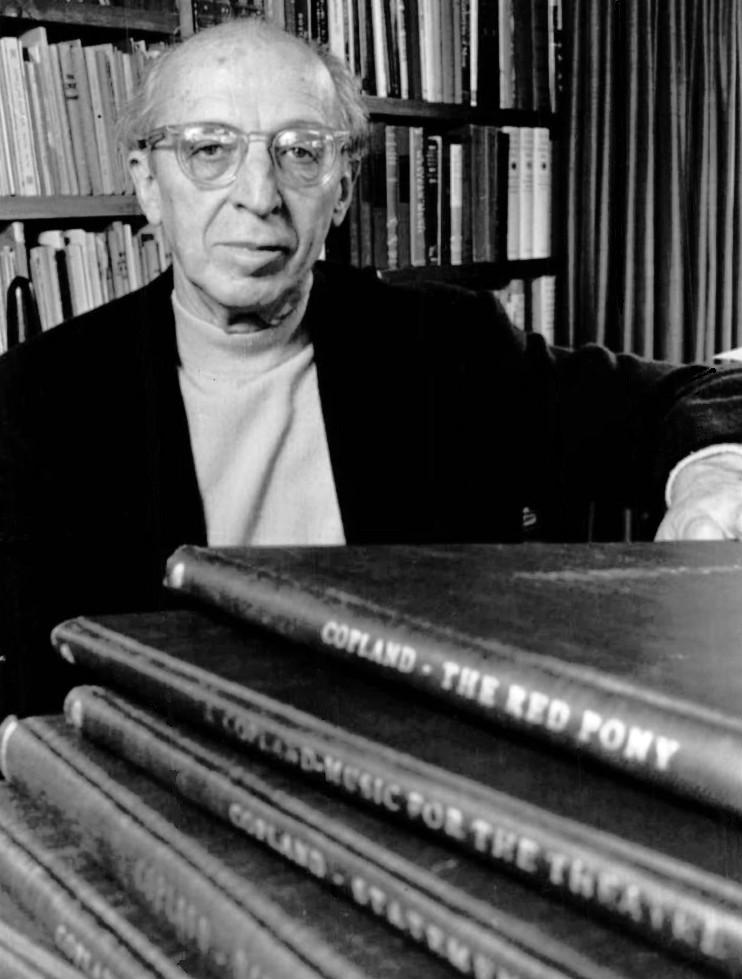
Aaron Copland; Best Scoring of a Dramatic or Comedy Picture winner

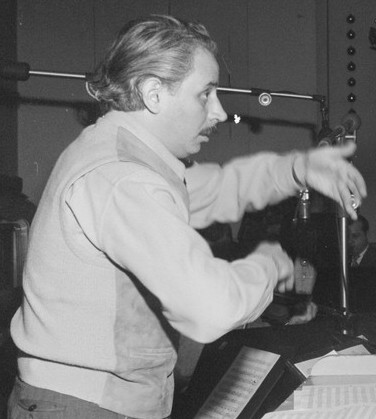
Lennie Hayton; Best Scoring of a Musical Picture co-winner

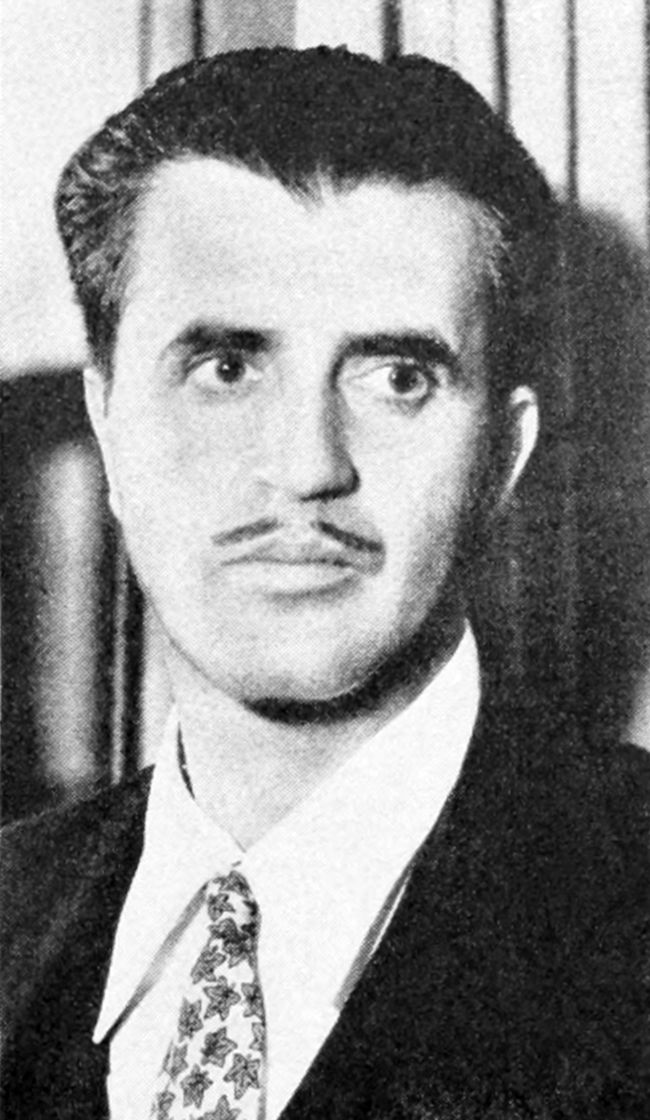
Cedric Gibbons; Best Art Direction, Color co-winner

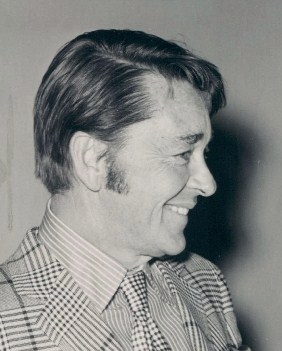
Travilla; Best Costume Design, Color co-winner

=== Awards ===
Nominees were announced on February 12, 1950. Winners are listed first and highlighted in boldface.

**Best Motion Picture**: **All the King's Men – Robert Rossen for Columbia Pictures**; Battleground – Dore Schary for Metro-Goldwyn-Mayer; The Heiress – William Wyler for Paramount Pictures; A Letter to Three Wives – Sol C. Siegel for 20th Century Fox; Twelve O'Clock High – Darryl F. Zanuck for 20th Century Fox	**Best Directing**: **Joseph L. Mankiewicz – A Letter to Three Wives**; Robert Rossen – All the King's Men; William A. Wellman – Battleground; Carol Reed – The Fallen Idol; William Wyler – The Heiress
**Best Actor**: **Broderick Crawford – All the King's Men as Willie Stark**; Kirk Douglas – Champion as Midge Kelly; Gregory Peck – Twelve O'Clock High as Brigadier General Frank Savage; Richard Todd – The Hasty Heart as Cpl. Lachlan "Lachie" MacLachlan; John Wayne – Sands of Iwo Jima as Sgt. John M. Stryker	**Best Actress**: **Olivia de Havilland – The Heiress as Catherine Sloper**; Jeanne Crain – Pinky as Patricia "Pinky" Johnson; Susan Hayward – My Foolish Heart as Eloise Winters; Deborah Kerr – Edward, My Son as Evelyn Boult; Loretta Young – Come to the Stable as Sister Margaret
**Best Actor in a Supporting Role**: **Dean Jagger – Twelve O'Clock High as Major Harvey Stovall**; John Ireland – All the King's Men as Jack Burden; Arthur Kennedy – Champion as Connie; Ralph Richardson – The Heiress as Dr. Austin Sloper; James Whitmore – Battleground as Sgt. Kinnie	**Best Actress in a Supporting Role**: **Mercedes McCambridge – All the King's Men as Sadie Burke**; Ethel Barrymore – Pinky as Miss Em; Celeste Holm – Come to the Stable as Sister Scholastica; Elsa Lanchester – Come to the Stable as Amelia Potts; Ethel Waters – Pinky as Dicey Johnson
**Best Writing (Motion Picture Story)**: **The Stratton Story – Douglas Morrow**; Come to the Stable – Clare Boothe Luce; It Happens Every Spring – Shirley W. Smith and Valentine Davies; Sands of Iwo Jima – Harry Brown; White Heat – Virginia Kellogg	**Best Writing (Story and Screenplay)**: **Battleground – Robert Pirosh**; Jolson Sings Again – Sidney Buchman; Paisan – Alfred Hayes, Federico Fellini, Sergio Amidei, Marcello Pagliero, and Roberto Rossellini; Passport to Pimlico – T. E. B. Clarke; The Quiet One – Helen Levitt, Janice Loeb, and Sidney Meyers
**Best Writing (Screenplay)**: **A Letter to Three Wives – Joseph L. Mankiewicz from Letter to Five Wives by John Klempner**; All the King's Men – Robert Rossen from All the King's Men by Robert Penn Warren; Bicycle Thieves – Cesare Zavattini from The Bicycle Thief by Luigi Bartolini; Champion – Carl Foreman from "Champion" by Ring Lardner; The Fallen Idol – Graham Greene from "The Basement Room" by Graham Greene	**Best Documentary (Feature)**: **Daybreak in Udi – Crown Film Unit**; Kenji Comes Home – Paul F. Heard
**Best Documentary (Short Subject)**: **A Chance to Live – Richard de Rochemont**; **So Much for So Little – Edward Selzer**; 1848 – French Cinema General Cooperative; The Rising Tide – St. Francis-Xavier University, Antigonish, Nova Scotia	**Best Short Subject (One-Reel)**: **Aquatic House Party – Jack Eaton**; Roller Derby Girl – Justin Herman; So You Think You're Not Guilty – Gordon Hollingshead; Spills and Chills – Walton C. Ament; Water Trix – Pete Smith
**Best Short Subject (Two-Reel)**: **Van Gogh – Gaston Diehl and Robert Hessens**; The Boy and the Eagle – William Lasky; Chase of Death – Irving Allen; The Grass Is Always Greener – Gordon Hollingshead; Snow Carnival – Gordon Hollingshead	**Best Short Subject (Cartoon)**: **For Scent-imental Reasons – Edward Selzer**; Hatch Up Your Troubles – Fred Quimby; The Magic Fluke – Stephen Bosustow; Toy Tinkers – Walt Disney; ~~Canary Row – Edward Selzer~~ (nomination withdrawn by producer)
**Best Music (Music Score of a Dramatic or Comedy Picture)**: **The Heiress – Aaron Copland**; Beyond the Forest – Max Steiner; Champion – Dimitri Tiomkin	**Best Music (Scoring of a Musical Picture)**: **On the Town – Roger Edens and Lennie Hayton**; Jolson Sings Again – Morris Stoloff and George Duning; Look for the Silver Lining – Ray Heindorf
**Best Music (Song)**: **"Baby, It's Cold Outside" from Neptune's Daughter – Music and Lyrics by Frank Loesser**; "It's a Great Feeling" from It's a Great Feeling – Music by Jule Styne; Lyrics by Sammy Cahn; "Lavender Blue" from So Dear to My Heart – Music by Eliot Daniel; Lyrics by Larry Morey; "My Foolish Heart" from My Foolish Heart – Music by Victor Young; Lyrics by Ned Washington; "Through a Long and Sleepless Night" from Come to the Stable – Music by Alfred Newman; Lyrics by Mack Gordon	**Best Sound Recording**: **Twelve O'Clock High – Thomas T. Moulton**; Once More, My Darling – Leslie I. Carey; Sands of Iwo Jima – Daniel J. Bloomberg
**Best Art Direction (Black-and-White)**: **The Heiress – Art Direction: John Meehan and Harry Horner; Set Decoration: Emile Kuri**; Come to the Stable – Art Direction: Lyle R. Wheeler and Joseph C. Wright; Set Decoration: Thomas Little and Paul S. Fox; Madame Bovary – Art Direction: Cedric Gibbons and Jack Martin Smith; Set Decoration: Edwin B. Willis and Richard Pefferle	**Best Art Direction (Color)**: **Little Women – Art Direction: Cedric Gibbons and Paul Groesse; Set Decoration: Edwin B. Willis and Jack D. Moore**; Adventures of Don Juan – Art Direction: Edward Carrere; Set Decoration: Lyle Reifsnider; Saraband for Dead Lovers – Art Direction and Set Direction: Jim Morahan, William Kellner and Michael Relph
**Best Cinematography (Black-and-White)**: **Battleground – Paul C. Vogel**; Champion – Franz Planer; Come to the Stable – Joseph LaShelle; The Heiress – Leo Tover; Prince of Foxes – Leon Shamroy	**Best Cinematography (Color)**: **She Wore a Yellow Ribbon – Winton C. Hoch**; The Barkleys of Broadway – Harry Stradling; Jolson Sings Again – William Snyder; Little Women – Robert Planck and Charles Schoenbaum; Sand – Charles G. Clarke
**Best Costume Design (Black-and-White)**: **The Heiress – Edith Head and Gile Steele**; Prince of Foxes – Vittorio Nino Novarese	**Best Costume Design (Color)**: **Adventures of Don Juan – Leah Rhodes, Travilla and Marjorie Best**; Mother Is a Freshman – Kay Nelson
**Best Film Editing**: **Champion – Harry W. Gerstad**; All the King's Men – Robert Parrish and Al Clark; Battleground – John Dunning; Sands of Iwo Jima – Richard L. Van Enger; The Window – Frederic Knudtson	**Best Special Effects**: **Mighty Joe Young – ARKO Productions**; Tulsa – Walter Wanger Pictures

=== Special Foreign Language Film Award ===
- To Bicycle Thieves (Italy) - voted by the Academy Board of Governors as the most outstanding foreign language film released in the United States during 1949.

=== Special awards ===
- To Bobby Driscoll, as the outstanding juvenile actor of 1949.
- To Fred Astaire for his unique artistry and his contributions to the technique of musical pictures.
- To Cecil B. DeMille, distinguished motion picture pioneer, for 37 years of brilliant showmanship.
- To Jean Hersholt, for distinguished service to the motion picture industry.

== Presenters and performers ==
=== Presenters ===
- June Allyson and Dick Powell (Best Cinematography)
- Anne Baxter and John Hodiak (Short Subject Awards)
- Charles Brackett (Honorary Award to Cecil B. DeMille)
- James Cagney (Best Picture)
- Peggy Dow and Joanne Dru (Best Costume Design)
- José Ferrer (Scientific & Technical Awards)
- Barbara Hale and Ruth Roman (Best Art Direction)
- James Hilton (Writing Awards)
- John Lund (Best Sound Recording)
- Ida Lupino (Best Director)
- Ray Milland (Best Supporting Actress)
- George Murphy (Documentary Awards)
- Patricia Neal (Best Special Effects)
- Donald O'Connor (Juvenile Award to Bobby Driscoll)
- Cole Porter (Music Awards)
- Micheline Presle (Best Foreign Language Film)
- Ronald Reagan (Honorary Award to Jean Hersholt)
- Mark Robson (Best Film Editing)
- Ginger Rogers (Honorary Award to Fred Astaire)
- James Stewart (Best Actress)
- Claire Trevor (Best Supporting Actor)
- Jane Wyman (Best Actor)

=== Performers ===
- Gene Autry
- Ann Blyth
- Arlene Dahl, Betty Garrett, Ricardo Montalbán, and Red Skelton ("Baby, It's Cold Outside" from Neptune's Daughter)
- Dean Martin
- Smilin' Jack Smith

== Multiple nominations and awards ==
Films with multiple nominations
Nominations	Film
8	The Heiress
7	All the King's Men
7	Come to the Stable
6	Battleground
6	Champion
4	Sands of Iwo Jima
4	Twelve O'Clock High
3	Jolson Sings Again
3	A Letter to Three Wives
3	Pinky
2	Adventures of Don Juan
2	The Fallen Idol
2	Little Women
2	My Foolish Heart
2	Prince of Foxes

Films with multiple awards
Awards	Film
4	The Heiress
3	All the King's Men
2	Battleground
2	A Letter to Three Wives
2	Twelve O'Clock High

== See also ==
- 7th Golden Globe Awards
- 1949 in film
- 1st Primetime Emmy Awards
- 2nd Primetime Emmy Awards
- 3rd British Academy Film Awards
- 4th Tony Awards
