= Lane Nakano =

American soldier & Actor

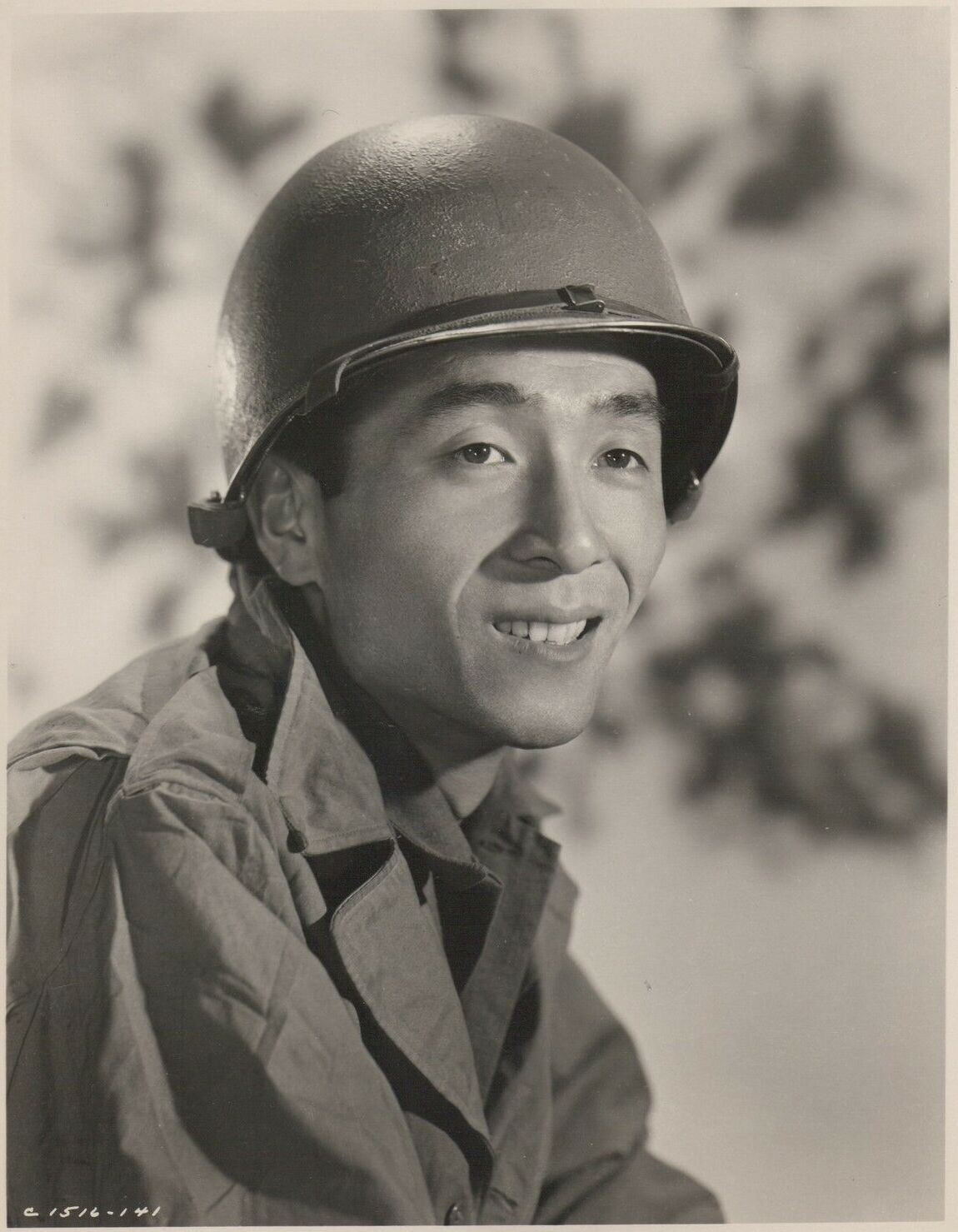
- Nakano in a publicity photo for Go for Broke! (1951)
- Born: Tsutomu Nakano; March 16, 1925
- Died: April 28, 2005 (aged 80); Sherman Oaks, California, US
- Spouse: Fumi Nakano
- Children: 2, including Desmond Nakano

Lane Nakano (March 16, 1925 – April 28, 2005) was an American combat soldier turned actor.

== Early life ==
Nakano grew up in the Boyle Heights neighborhood of Los Angeles, California. Nakano had two brothers, Frank and Lyle and two sisters, May and Lucy.

Nakano's family unofficially adopted legendary Marine Corps combat interpreter Guy Gabaldon at age 12. Gabaldon was awarded the Navy Cross for his heroic actions on Saipan and Tinian islands during World War II which included saving the lives of many Japanese civilians on the two islands.

=== World War II ===
During World War II, following the signing of Executive Order 9066, Nakano and his family were interned at the Heart Mountain Relocation Center in Wyoming.

== Career ==
=== Military ===
While Nakano was in the Heart Mountain Relocation Center, he volunteered for service in the U.S. Army. Nakano and his brother were assigned to the much decorated 442nd Regimental Combat Team.

=== Entertainment ===
Nakano's opportunity to work as an actor began when he was discovered after the war by Hollywood director and writer Robert Pirosh. Pirosh cast Nakano as second billing after American actor Van Johnson in the 1951 war film about the history of the 442nd Regimental Combat Team during World War II, Go for Broke.

Nakano was known as a singer in Los Angeles' Japanese-American community.

=== Business ===
After he left acting, Nakano became vice president of the import-export firm Magna Industries, Inc., of Los Angeles. For years, he also was involved in businesses related to greenhouses and aluminum siding.

== Personal life ==
Nakano married a woman named Fumi, and they had two sons, Dean Nakano and film director Desmond Nakano.

On April 28, 2005, Nakano died from emphysema in a hospital in Sherman Oaks, California at the age of 80.

=== Legacy ===
Nakano's son, Desmond, wrote and produced the 2007 film American Pastime using Lane's experiences in internment camp as one source of historical information and naming the two lead characters Lyle and Lane. While the lead character is Lyle, Lane, the older of the two brothers, comes back from the 442nd missing a leg, and becomes the focal character in the final scene.

== Filmography ==
=== Film ===
- 1949 Tokyo Joe - Rickshaw driver.
- 1951 Go for Broke - Sam.
- 1951 I Was an American Spy - Advance guard.
- 1951 Peking Express - driver of jeep.
- 1951 No Questions Asked - Lon.
- 1952 Japanese War Bride - Shiro Hasagawa.
- 1952 Hong Kong - C17 pilot.
- 1953 China Venture - Japanese sniper.
- 1954 Hell and High Water - Japanese sailor.
- 1954 Deep in My Heart- Japanese butler.
- 1958 The Geisha Boy - Japanese gardener.
- 1959 Don't Give Up the Ship - Japanese soldier.
- 1965 Three Weeks of Love - Ken Okimura.
- 1965 Sea of Souls - Ken Okimura.

=== Television series ===
- 1960 Hawaiian Eye. Then There Were Three episode. Season 1 episode 17. Taki.
- 1960 Route 66. Layout at Glen Canyon episode. Season 1, episode 9. Nikko.

== See also ==
- List of Hawaiian Eye episodes
- List of Route 66 episodes

== Additional sources ==
- Yenne, Bill (2007). Rising Sons: The Japanese American GIs Who Fought for the United States in World War II. New York: Macmillan. ISBN 978-0-312-35464-0.
