= Jerry Fujikawa =

American actor

- Born: Hatsuo Fujikawa; February 18, 1912; Monterey County, California, U.S.
- Died: April 30, 1983 (aged 71); Los Angeles County, California, U.S.
- Occupation: Actor
- Years active: 1950–1983
- Spouses: Emily Elizabeth Grinnell; Marion "Skeeter" Gates (m. 1953)
- Children: 6

Harlan Hatsuo "Jerry" Fujikawa (Japanese: 藤川 初男, February 18, 1912 — April 30, 1983) was an American stage, screen and television actor known most notably as the gardener in Roman Polanski's film Chinatown.

== Personal life ==
Fujikawa was born on February 18, 1912, in Monterey County, California. During early publicity surrounding his career, he was said to be a native of Salinas. His family, along with other Japanese-Americans on the west coast, were summarily detained in concentration camps following the Attack on Pearl Harbor and the subsequent issuance of Executive Order 9066 in February 1942. At the time, he was living in Los Angeles. Fujikawa was detained at Manzanar War Relocation Center.

He was first married to Emily Elizabeth (née Grinnell); they had three children: a daughter, Tirsa Meiko and twin sons (Gerald Matsuo and Eugene Takeo). Before he and his family were interned, Fujikawa listed his former occupations as a gardener, in agriculture, and as a salesman.

While interned at Manzanar, Fujikawa volunteered for the United States Army, joining as a messenger of Charlie Company in the 100th Infantry Battalion in June 1943. Fujikawa's family moved to Longmont, Colorado; his young son Gerald was killed in an automobile accident in Denver on June 5, 1943. His wife and children had planned to meet him in Denver prior to his induction ceremony in Salt Lake City.

During his war service, Fujikawa was wounded on July 9, 1944 near Castellina, Italy. Although his service record contains no further entries until his discharge date (May 17, 1945), Fujikawa participated in operations in France later in 1944. Fujikawa's first marriage disintegrated soon after he returned from the war in Europe.

After the war, Fujikawa adopted the stage name Jerry and married Marion "Skeeter" Gates, a Broadway actress, in 1953. Together they had three children: Charles, Peter, and Cynthia. Fujikawa and Gates were married until his death in 1983.

== Career ==
Fujikawa initially gained publicity for his stage roles: debuting as a villager in the original Broadway production of The Teahouse of the August Moon (1953). Other stage appearances included a role in Wedding in Japan (1957, off-Broadway), as the butler Toy in The Pleasure of His Company (1958), and as Father Ling in It's a Bird... It's a Plane... It's Superman (1966).

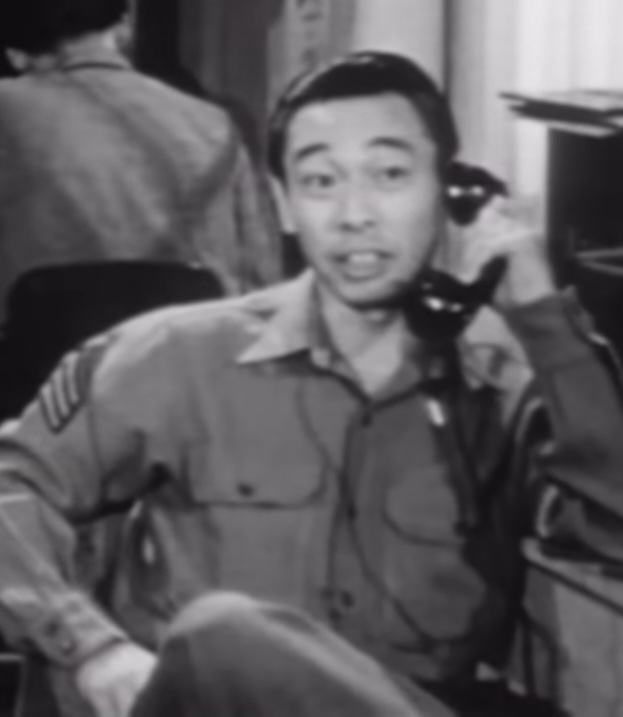
Fujikawa in Go for Broke! (1951)

During the early part of his career, Fujikawa also appeared in the films Go For Broke! (1951) and The Journey (1959). At the time, he was known primarily as a character actor, wearing special effects makeup for varied television roles in The Twilight Zone, The Untouchables, Bachelor Father, and The Man from U.N.C.L.E. His career would go on to include numerous guest roles on other prominent television shows, including seven appearances on M*A*S*H, and single roles for Taxi (S4E7, 1981) and The Winds of War (1983).

Fujikawa had a recurring role as Matsu, the uncle of the eponymous Mr. Takahashi played by Pat Morita in the short-lived sitcom Mr. T and Tina (1976).

== Legacy ==
In 1991, Fujikawa's daughter Cynthia began researching her father's life, which led to her reuniting in 1993 with her half-sister Tirsa from Jerry's first marriage. The research eventually was developed into the solo play Old Man River, first workshopped in 1995. It debuted in 1997 at the New Victory Theater and was filmed in 1998. Based on his work, the film's director, Allan Holzman, would later receive an American Cinema Editors Eddie Award in 2000 for Documentaries.

== Television ==
Year	Title	Role	Notes
1961	The Twilight Zone	Japanese Captain	Episode: A Quality of Mercy
1981	Taxi	Louie's Mom Remarries	Uncredited

== Filmography ==
Year	Title	Role	Notes
1950	Three Came Home	Japanese Soldier	Uncredited
1951	Halls of Montezuma	Japanese Soldier	Uncredited
1951	I Was an American Spy	Japanese Guard	Uncredited
1951	Go for Broke!	Communications Sergeant	Uncredited
1952	Japanese War Bride	Man at Fish Market	
1959	The Journey	Mitsu	
1961	Bachelor Flat	Frank - Gardener	Uncredited
1962	A Girl Named Tamiko	Manager	Uncredited
1968	Nobody's Perfect	Watanabe	
1969	The Extraordinary Seaman	Admiral Shimagoshi	
1970	Which Way to the Front?	Japanese Naval Officer	Uncredited
1971	The Million Dollar Duck	Japanese Official	Uncredited
1971	Made for Each Other	Vietnamese Man	Uncredited
1972	The King of Marvin Gardens	Agura	
1974	Chinatown	Gardener	
1975	Farewell, My Lovely	Fence	
1975	I Wonder Who's Killing Her Now?	Roulette Winner	
1976	Eat My Dust!	Chou Lick	
1976	Midway	Japanese Gentleman	Uncredited
1978	The End	Japanese Gardener	
1978	The Cat from Outer Space	2nd E.R.L. Expert	
1979	Scavenger Hunt	Sakamoto	
1981	There Was a Little Girl	Mr. Kimura	
1983	Second Thoughts	Yamashiro	(final film role)
