= Washington Story =

1952 film by Robert Pirosh

- Theatrical release poster
- Directed by: Robert Pirosh
- Written by: Robert Pirosh
- Produced by: Dore Schary
- Starring: Van Johnson; Patricia Neal; Louis Calhern
- Cinematography: John Alton
- Edited by: John Durant; John Dunning
- Music by: Conrad Salinger
- Distributed by: Metro-Goldwyn-Mayer
- Release date: July 1, 1952
- Running time: 81 minutes
- Country: United States
- Language: English
- Budget: $1,419,000
- Box office: $684,000

Washington Story is a 1952 American comedy drama film starring Van Johnson and Patricia Neal. Directed by Robert Pirosh, it follows a green reporter in search of government corruption who instead falls for the congressman she's investigating.

== Plot ==
On her first trip to Washington, D.C., aspiring reporter Alice Kingsley is shown around by Gilbert Nunnally, a successful radio commentator. Nunnally has a cynical view of the Capitol and everybody in it, expressing his belief that every politician can be bought.

Alice wants to see if there is any truth to that, and is directed by Nunnally to a young Massachusetts Democratic congressman with a squeaky-clean image, Joe Gresham, and introduces herself. Joe is wary of the press and makes a telephone call to check her credentials, but Alice, having anticipated this, gives him a number for Nunnally, who pretends to be the reporter's editor and vouches for her credentials.

Following him around, Alice is impressed by Joe's work ethic and personality. She wonders if veteran Republican politician Charles Birch is an antagonist, only to learn that Birch has been a mentor to Joe and is greatly admired by him.

Nunnally persuades Alice that something nefarious is going on between Joe and a lobbyist named Phil Emery, who is trying to get Joe's key vote for a bill to pass. Joe is more concerned about its effect on his own constituents than its greater impact. Alice isn't sure what to make of that, or of Joe's seeming disinterest in an elderly immigrant's possible deportation.

After a late-night meeting, apparently with Emery, and another private parley with him at a cocktail party, Joe becomes strongly suspect in Alice‘s eyes. After an unexpected Senate passage of the key bill, Joe has a change of heart and votes in favor of it. Alice is now persuaded by Nunnally that he sold his vote for a price. However, she learns from Birch that Joe's adverse attitude toward the press is fueled by an underhanded charge against him by Nunnally, and that Joe has a libel suit pending against him in two weeks' time. Nunnally confronts the congressman and offers to suppress the story about Joe selling his vote if the lawsuit is dropped. Joe punches him in the nose instead.

Alice runs into the immigrant, who tells her how Joe had made great efforts to ensure he could remain in the country. It was he, not Emery, that the all-night meeting had been with; Alice also learns that Joe had an honest change of heart about the bill, recognizing it was for the greater good. Alice writes a column singing Joe's praises, Joe recognizes her true character, and both surrender to their love.

== Cast ==
- Van Johnson as Joe Gresham
- Patricia Neal as Alice Kingsley
- Louis Calhern as Birch
- Philip Ober as Nunnally
- Sidney Blackmer as Emery
- Elizabeth Patterson as Miss Dee
- Raymond Greenleaf as John Sheldon

== Reception ==
=== Box office ===
According to MGM records the movie was not a hit, earning $557,000 in the US and Canada and $127,000 elsewhere, registering a loss to the studio of $1,060,000.
