= 1950 Academy Awards =

1950 Academy Awards may refer to:

- 22nd Academy Awards, the Academy Awards ceremony that took place in 1950
- 23rd Academy Awards, the 1951 ceremony honoring the best in film for 1950
