= Go for Broke! (1951 film) =

1951 film by Robert Pirosh

Go For Broke!
- Theatrical release poster
- Directed by: Robert Pirosh
- Written by: Robert Pirosh
- Produced by: Dore Schary
- Starring: Van Johnson; Lane Nakano; George Miki
- Cinematography: Paul C. Vogel
- Edited by: James E. Newcom
- Music by: Alberto Colombo
- Distributed by: Metro-Goldwyn-Mayer
- Release dates: May 9, 1951 (Los Angeles); May 24, 1951 (New York)
- Running time: 92 minutes
- Country: United States
- Language: English
- Budget: $1,337,000
- Box office: $3,337,000

Go for Broke!

Go For Broke! is a 1951 black-and-white war film directed by Robert Pirosh, produced by Dore Schary and starring Van Johnson and six veterans of the 442nd Infantry Regiment. The film stars Henry Nakamura, Warner Anderson and Don Haggerty in its large cast.

The film dramatizes the real-life story of the 442nd, which was composed of Nisei (second-generation Americans born of Japanese parents) soldiers. Its title reflects a phrase used by the Nisei that was largely unfamiliar to other Americans at the time of the film's release, although it has found common contemporary use in American English.

== Plot ==
In 1943 at Camp Shelby, Mississippi, newly commissioned Lt. Michael Grayson reports for duty to train the 442nd Infantry Regiment, a unit established on the mainland and composed of Nisei. His expectation was to return to the U.S. 36th Infantry Division, a Texas National Guard unit, in which he had served as an enlisted soldier. He must command a group of people whom he sees as Japanese enemies rather than as Americans. Grayson runs his platoon in strict observance of military regulations.

Arriving in Italy, the unit is joined by the 100th Battalion, a Nisei unit assembled in Hawaii before the formation of 442nd. The troops of the 100th are seasoned veterans, and the new arrivals tap them for advice. On the march to the front lines, Grayson is left behind when fraternizing with a woman, but the colonel does not notice because his platoon has covered for Grayson during an inspection of their positions.

By the actions of the 442nd in Italy and France, Grayson finds reason to replace his bigotry with respect. Despite his objections, he is transferred to the 36th as a liaison when the 442nd is attached to the 36th. The Nisei learn that he has defended them against bigotry, even brawling with an old friend from the 36th who had insulted them.

The 36th is surrounded by the German army and the 442nd rescues them. On their return home, the members of the 442nd are awarded the distinction of the eighth Presidential Unit Citation.

== Cast ==
- Van Johnson as Lt. Michael Grayson
- Lane Nakano as Sam
- George Miki as Chick
- Akira Fukunaga as Frank
- Ken K. Okamoto as Kaz
- Henry Oyasato as Takashi Ohhara
- Harry Hamada as Masami
- Henry Nakamura as Tommy Kamakura
- Warner Anderson as Col. Charles W. Pence
- Don Haggerty as Sgt. Wilson I. Culley
- Gianna Maria Canale as Rosina
- Dan Riss as Capt. Solari
- John Banner as a German officer
- Jerry Fujikawa as Communications Sergeant (uncredited)
- Richard Anderson as Lieutenant (uncredited)
- Hugh Beaumont as Chaplain (uncredited)
- Frank Wilcox as HQ General (uncredited)
- Mario Siletti as Italian Farmer (uncredited)
- Edward Earle as General at Dress Parade (uncredited)
- Ann Codee as Pianist (uncredited)

Fukunaga, Hamada, Miki, Nakano, Okamoto and Oyasato were actual members of the 442nd Infantry Regiment.

== Production ==
During the European theater during World War II, the 442nd Infantry Regiment became the most heavily decorated unit for its size and length of service in the history of the United States military, as well as one of the units with the highest casualty rates.

As with his earlier film script for Battleground, in which Van Johnson also starred, writer-director Robert Pirosh focused on the average squad member, mixing humor with pathos, while accurately detailing equipment and tactics used by American infantry in World War II.

The film includes archive footage of General Mark Clark and President Harry Truman presenting the unit citation.

== Release ==
The film's gala world premiere was held at Grauman's Egyptian Theatre in Hollywood on May 9, 1951. Invitees included prominent film stars, military officials and civic and business leaders. Approximately 100 Purple Heart veterans of the 442nd attended, including the unit's color guard. Bleacher seats were erected for public viewing of the arrivals. During a stage presentation preceding the showing of the film, a brigadier general presented Robert Pirosh with the Army Certificate of Achievement and producer Dory Schary was awarded a special citation by the Nisei. Schary paid tribute to the mother of a Medal of Honor recipient who had been killed in action in Italy.

== Reception ==
In a contemporary review for The New York Times, critic Bosley Crowther called the film "a respectful and rousing tribute" and wrote:

[T]his picture presents a forceful lesson in racial tolerance and friendliness. For here, without fuss or feathers or an over-expense of preachy words, is aptly revealed and demonstrated the loyalty and courage of a racial minority group, along with the normal human qualities or decency and humor inherent in these men. ... Although Mr. Pirosh's G. I.s are here "boodaheads," in the main, and are consequently prone to exhibit certain Nisei resentments and attitudes, they are fundamentally Americans ... And it is this quality in the picture—this accomplishment of sincerity and credibility in the Nisei soldiers, many of whom are actually played by veterans and heroes of the 442d—that deserves the highest praise. For in making his Nisei genuine people, with the characteristics of average young men—not fancified little tin heroes—Mr. Pirosh has simply achieved precisely the affection, the understanding and the tolerance for them that they deserve.

Critic Edwin Schallert of the Los Angeles Times wrote:

Generally speaking the picture emphasizes good will and understanding, arrived at deviously and humanly, because or the contrasts symbolized by Johnson on the one hand and the men who serve under him. ... Sketchy in its values by comparison with "Battleground" is this new Metro-Schary-Pirosh war feature, yet it contains in a minor degree various elements that made the earlier production outstanding. It does not attempt spectacular battle scenes, but those that it centers on are well carried out. There are many vivid touches in the photography to endow what happens with reality. "Go for Broke!" is probably to be especially commended for highlighting an unusual phase of the Italian and French campaigns of World War II.

According to MGM records, the film earned $2,531,000 in the U.S. and Canada and $806,000 overseas, resulting in a profit of $761,000.

== Awards ==
Robert Pirosh's screenplay was nominated for an Academy Award in 1951.

== Legacy ==
In 1979, the film entered the public domain in the United States because MGM failed to renew its copyright registration in the 28th year after publication.

== See also ==
- Go for Broke Monument
- Only the Brave
- American Pastime

== Additional sources ==
- Wu, Ellen D. (2014). The Color of Success: Asian Americans and the Invention of the Model Minority. Princeton University Press. ISBN 9780691168029, pp. 88ff.
- Barsam, Richard Meran. (1992). Nonfiction Film : a Critical History. Bloomington, Indiana: Indiana University Press. ISBN 978-0-253-31124-5; ISBN 978-0-253-20706-7; OCLC 24107769
- Takemoto, Kenneth Kaname. (2006). Nisei Memories: My Parents Talk About the War Years. Seattle: University of Washington Press. ISBN 978-0-295-98585-5; OCLC 260074492
- Sterner, C. Douglas. (2008). Go For Broke : the Nisei Warriors of World War II Who Conquered Germany, Japan, and American Bigotry. Clearfield, Utah: American Legacy Historical Press. ISBN 978-0-9796896-1-1; OCLC 141855086
- Yenne, Bill. (2007). Rising Sons: The Japanese American GIs Who Fought for the United States in World War II. New York: Macmillan. ISBN 978-0-312-35464-0 OCLC 122261832
- Steidl, Franz. (1997). "Lost Battalions: Going for Broke in the Vosges, Autumn 1944." Novato, California: Presidio Press. ISBN 978-0-89141-622-7, ISBN 978-0-89141-727-9; OCLC 36170542
