= White Man's Burden (film) =

1995 American drama film by Desmond Nakano

- Theatrical release poster
- Directed by: Desmond Nakano
- Written by: Desmond Nakano
- Produced by: Lawrence Bender
- Starring: John Travolta; Harry Belafonte; Tom Bower; Margaret Avery; Kelly Lynch
- Cinematography: Willy Kurant
- Edited by: Nancy Richardson
- Music by: Howard Shore
- Production companies: UGC; Rysher Entertainment; A Band Apart
- Distributed by: Savoy Pictures
- Release date: December 1, 1995 (U.S.)
- Running time: 89 minutes
- Country: United States
- Language: English
- Budget: $7 million
- Box office: $9 million

White Man's Burden is a 1995 American drama film about racism, written and directed by Desmond Nakano and starring John Travolta and Harry Belafonte. Set in an alternate American society where the socioeconomic positions of white people and black people are reversed, the film follows a disadvantaged white factory worker whose life is ruined after racial discrimination influences his termination, leading to him kidnapping his black former employer. The title is a well-known phrase inspired by the famous poem of the same title by Rudyard Kipling. The film was released in the U.S. on December 1, 1995 to weak box-office performance and negative reviews from critics.

== Plot ==
In an alternate American society, race relations have developed similar to how they did in real life, but with the races effectively swapped: black people make up the privileged and well-off majority, while white people make up the disadvantaged and impoverished minority. At dinner, wealthy black CEO Thaddeus Thomas casually discusses the supposed genetic inferiority of white people because their children grow up without fathers.

In an attempt at self-improvement, white candy factory worker Louis Pinnock offers to deliver a package to Thomas after his shift. However, at the Thomas residence, he accidentally views Thomas's wife naked through a window, which Thomas notices and complains about to the vice-president of the factory, requesting a delivery man who is not a "peeping Tom". Although Thomas does not suggest punishing Pinnock, the VP "gets the message" and immediately fires Pinnock, whose attempts at apologizing to Thomas are dismissed.

Without any education, connections, or advanced skills, Pinnock finds difficulty getting a job and is unable to support his family, leading to their eviction. Pinnock's mother-in-law scolds him for failing as a man and tells him they have no space for him in their new home. Pinnock's truck breaks down and he is forced to walk, only to be accosted by black police officers who confuse him for a bank robber because "he fit the description". Pinnock is beaten by the officers, who are chased away by a mob of bar patrons.

Desperate and believing he has no options left, Pinnock kidnaps Thomas at gunpoint and demands a large sum of money that he believes he is owed for his termination. After multiple failed attempts to withdraw the money, Pinnock holds Thomas hostage for the weekend and takes him through the ghetto where he lives, but Thomas remains unsympathetic and calls Pinnock a failure who blames the world for his problems. The two spend time in an abandoned building, where Thomas comes to understand ghetto life and recognize the racism in his society. However, Thomas has a heart attack, and Pinnock's attempts at CPR fail to resuscitate him. In an attempt to signal help, Pinnock shoots out a store's windows to summon an emergency response. However, the majority-black police, seeing Pinnock as a white man with a gun, presume bad intent and open fire, shooting and killing Pinnock.

In the aftermath, Thomas visits Pinnock's grieving family and offers the payment he sought. His widow refuses, and when Thomas awkwardly asks if she wants more, she asks him how much he thinks would be enough, before shutting the door on him.

== Cast ==
- John Travolta as Louis Pinnock
- Harry Belafonte as Thaddeus Thomas
- Kelly Lynch as Marsha Pinnock
- Margaret Avery as Megan Thomas
- Tom Bower as Stanley
- Andrew Lawrence as Donnie Pinnock
- Bumper Robinson as Martin
- Tom Wright as Lionel
- Sheryl Lee Ralph as Roberta
- Judith Drake as Dorothy
- Robert Gossett as John
- Wesley Thompson as Williams
- Tom Nolan as Johansson
- Willie C. Carpenter as Marcus
- Michael Beach as a policeman
- Carrie Snodgress as Josine
- Seth Green as 3rd Youth at Hot Dog Stand

== Production ==
Producer Lawrence Bender said mainstream Hollywood financiers were hesitant to support the film due to its heavy thematic emphasis on race relations and instead relied on French financing to secure the film's $7 million budget. Bender said his desire to make the film came from then recent prominent news stories involving Colin Powell, Louis Farrakhan, O. J. Simpson, and South Africa. John Travolta made White Man's Burden prior to filming Get Shorty, but Rysher Entertainment, who produced both films opted to hold off the release of White Man's Burden until after Get Shorty was released.

== Reception ==
=== Critical response ===
The film gained a negative reception from critics. It holds a 24% rating on Rotten Tomatoes based on 34 reviews with the consensus: "Despite earnest work from its leads, White Man's Burden's attempt at racial commentary is a well-intentioned misfire." Audiences surveyed by CinemaScore gave the film a grade of "C" on scale of A+ to F.

A "D" score was awarded to the film by Owen Gleiberman of Entertainment Weekly.

Stephen Holden of The New York Times wrote "Were it not for John Travolta's big-hearted portrayal of an unemployed white factory worker driven to commit a desperate act, the movie would be an emotionally frozen exercise in cautious high-mindedness".

Rolling Stone's Peter Travers accused the film of "spiral[ing] into tragedy but never into stirring drama".

=== Box office ===
The film was not a box office success, though the very small budget meant its losses were also minimal; it was widely seen as a blip on the radar during John Travolta's massive comeback as a film star during the post-Pulp Fiction phase of his career.

The film grossed $3.7 million in the US and Canada and an estimated $9 million worldwide.

== Soundtrack ==
White Man's Burden

Soundtrack album by Various artists
- Released: November 7, 1995
- Length: 33:59
- Label: Atlantic

A soundtrack album to the film was released on November 7, 1995.

=== Track listing ===
1. Blues Traveler - "Regarding Steven" (John Popper) - 4:44
2. Hootie & the Blowfish - "Dream Baby" (Cindy Walker) - 2:59
3. Changing Faces - "We Got It Goin' On" - 3:04
4. Me'shell Ndegeocello - "Time Has Come Today" (Joseph Chambers/Willie Chambers) - 6:01
5. Dave Matthews Band - "Tripping Billies" (Dave Matthews) - 4:14
6. Cracker - "How Can I Live my Life Without You" (Johnny Hickman/David Lowery) - 3:34
7. Bush - "Broken TV" (Gavin Rossdale) - 3:42
8. Meat Puppets - "Animal" (Curt Kirkwood) - 4:31
9. Howard Shore - "The Burden" - 4:11
10. Howard Shore - "The Hymn" - 2:29

== See also ==
- Fable - a 1965 TV play about similar subject matter.
- BabaKiueria - a 1986 Australian mockumentary about an oppressed white minority in a society dominated by Aboriginal Australians.
- Lion's Blood - a 2002 alternate history novel about an alternate world where an Islamic Africa is the center of technological progress and learning while Europe remains largely tribal and backward.
- Noughts and Crosses - a 2020 television series, based on the novels by Malorie Blackman, about similar subject matter.
