= 7th Golden Globe Awards =

Film award ceremony in 1950

- Date: February 23, 1950

Highlights
- Best Picture: All the King's Men

The 7th Golden Globe Awards, honoring the best in film for 1949 films, were held on February 23, 1950.

== Winners and Nominees ==
=== Best Picture ===
All the King's Men directed by Robert Rossen

- Come to the Stable directed by Henry Koster

=== Best Actor in a Leading Role ===
Broderick Crawford - All the King's Men

- Richard Todd - The Hasty Heart

=== Best Actress in a Leading Role ===
Olivia de Havilland - The Heiress

- Deborah Kerr - Edward, My Son

=== Best Performance by an Actor in a Supporting Role in a Motion Picture ===
James Whitmore - Battleground

- David Brian - Intruder in the Dust

=== Best Performance by an Actress in a Supporting Role in a Motion Picture ===
Mercedes McCambridge - All the King's Men

- Miriam Hopkins - The Heiress

=== Best Director - Motion Picture ===
Robert Rossen - All the King's Men

- William Wyler - The Heiress

=== Best Screenplay - Motion Picture ===
Battleground - Robert Pirosh

- Rope of Sand - Walter Doniger

=== Best Music, Original Score - Motion Picture ===
The Inspector General - Johnny Green

- All the King's Men - George Duning

=== Best Foreign Language Film ===
Bicycle Thieves (Ladri di biciclette), Italy

- The Fallen Idol, UK

=== Best Cinematography - Black and White ===
Champion photographed by Franz F. Planer

- All the King's Men photographed by Burnett Guffey

=== Best Cinematography - Color ===
The Adventures of Ichabod and Mr. Toad by Walt Disney

- On The Town by Harold Rosson

=== Promoting International Understanding ===
The Hasty Heart directed by Vincent Sherman

- Monsieur Vincent directed by Maurice Cloche

=== New Star of the Year - Actor ===
Richard Todd in The Hasty Heart

- Juano Hernandez in Intruder in the Dust

=== New Star of the Year - Actress ===
Mercedes McCambridge in All the King's Men

- Ruth Roman in Champion
