= Guy Gabaldon =

U.S. marine; winner of the Navy Cross

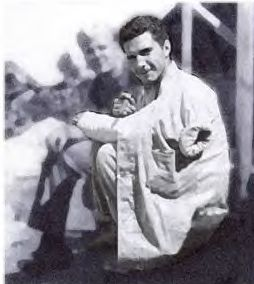
- PFC Guy Gabaldon
- Born: Guy Louis Gabaldon; March 22, 1926; Los Angeles, California, U.S.
- Died: August 31, 2006 (aged 80); Old Town, Florida, U.S.
- Military career
- Allegiance: United States
- Branch: United States Marine Corps
- Service years: 1943–1945
- Rank: Corporal
- Nicknames: Gabby, "The Pied Piper of Saipan"
- Unit: 2nd Marine Regiment
- Conflicts: World War II: Battle of Saipan; Battle of Tinian
- Awards: Navy Cross; Purple Heart

Guy Louis Gabaldon (March 22, 1926 – August 31, 2006) was a Chicano in the United States Marine Corps who, at age 18, persuaded to surrender over 1,300 Japanese soldiers and civilians during the battles for Saipan and Tinian islands in 1944 during World War II. Called "Gabby" by his friends, he became known as "The Pied Piper of Saipan" for his heroism on that island. Though Gabaldon was recommended for the Medal of Honor, he received the Silver Star, which was upgraded by the Marine Corps to the Navy Cross in 1960.

In 1960, a friend of Gabaldon's with Hollywood connections influenced the industry to make a movie about Gabaldon's version of events on Saipan called Hell to Eternity. In 1964, he unsuccessfully ran for U.S. Congressman in his Southern California district. In 1990, he authored a book entitled Saipan: Suicide Island.

== Early years ==
Gabaldon was born in Los Angeles, California. Gabaldon, who was of Mexican descent, was one of seven children. He was raised in East Los Angeles and, as a ten-year-old, he helped his family by shining shoes on Skid Row. Gabaldon became a member of a multi-ethnic gang known as the "Moe Gang". At age 12, he moved out of his home to live with the Nakano family, who were of Japanese heritage and whom he considered his extended family. He attended language school every day with their children and learned to speak Japanese. He also learned about their customs and culture.

== World War II ==
At the outbreak of World War II the Nakanos, his adopted (Note: "Gabaldon was not legally adopted by the Nakano family per se, he considered them his adopted family") family, were sent to a relocation camp named the Heart Mountain Relocation Center, in Wyoming. He traveled to Alaska to work in a cannery. On March 22, 1943, Gabaldon's 17th birthday, he joined the United States Marine Corps. He received his basic training at Camp Pendleton, completed the Enlisted Marine Japanese Language School at Camp Elliot in San Diego, and was assigned to Headquarters and Service Company, 2nd Marine Regiment, 2nd Marine Division, as a scout and observer.

=== The Pied Piper of Saipan ===
The capture of Saipan was considered essential for the establishment of airfields which would accommodate the B-29 Superfortress bombers to be used in what was then the planned full-scale invasion of the Japanese mainland. On June 15, 1944, an armada of 535 ships, carrying 127,570 U.S. military personnel which included Marines from the 2nd and 4th Marine Divisions, began the invasion of Saipan. Japanese soldiers seldom surrendered during World War II and, as the American military invasion went badly for the Japanese, they were ordered by their superiors on Saipan to kill seven American Marines or soldiers for every soldier they lost, or commit suicide.

According to Gabaldon, he began taking and bringing in prisoners the night of the first day that he arrived on Saipan. According to Gabaldon:

The first night I was on Saipan, I went out on my own ... I always worked on my own, and brought back two prisoners using my backstreet Japanese.

— Guy Gabaldon

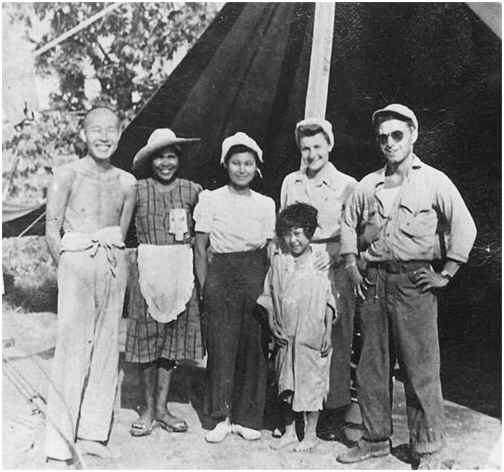
Private Guy Gabaldon (right) poses with a few of the Japanese soldiers and civilians who surrendered to him in 1944 during World War II

Gabaldon was reprimanded by his superior officers, and threatened with a court-martial for leaving his post. However, according to him the next night he went out and did it again. He carefully approached a cave, shot the enemy guards outside, moved off to one side of the cave, and yelled in Japanese, "You're surrounded and have no choice but to surrender. Come out, and you will not be killed! I assure you will be well-treated. We do not want to kill you!"

The next morning he says he returned with 50 Japanese prisoners. As a result, Gabaldon was permitted by his commanding officer to act as a "lone wolf" operator.

The next day, on July 8, Gabaldon captured two more enemy guards. He convinced one of them to return to his cave, with an offering of surrender. Shortly thereafter, a Japanese officer showed up. After speaking to Gabaldon, the officer accepted the conditions of surrender—and over eight hundred Japanese soldiers and civilians surrendered to Gabaldon, who turned them over to the U.S. military authorities. For his exploits, according to Gabaldon, he became known as The Pied Piper of Saipan. He alleges that he was the first American to own a motorcycle on the island of Saipan, after he "tactically acquired" it.

=== Contrary opinions on Gabaldon's actions on Saipan ===
In One Marine's War: A Combat Interpreter's Quest for Mercy in the Pacific by Gerald A. Meehl, USMC Japanese Language Officer Lt. Robert B. Sheeks – who also served on Saipan – expresses skepticism toward Gabaldon's accounts of his wartime actions. According to Sheeks, Gabaldon was a "relentless self-promoter" who allegedly exaggerated the number of enemy personnel he persuaded to surrender, claiming that many of those were civilians rather than soldiers. Sheeks further asserted that Gabaldon minimized the contributions of others involved in the mass surrenders during and after the battle.

Meehl also cites interviews with other Saipan veterans and references additional reports, including an allegation – relayed through Sheeks – that Gabaldon once struck an elderly Japanese civilian, breaking his jaw after the man failed to answer a question quickly enough.

These accounts, however, remain uncorroborated by primary source documentation or official records. Gabaldon's actions were officially recognized by the U.S. military, which awarded him the Navy Cross (upgraded from a previously awarded Silver Star), and his commanding officers originally recommended him for the Medal of Honor. Historians have noted that postwar recollections, particularly decades after the fact, may reflect personal bias or conflicting memories and should be evaluated critically when used to assess contemporaneously documented events.

=== Tinian ===
Gabaldon continued to capture more Japanese people on Tinian. While back on Saipan fighting Japanese guerrillas still on the island, he was seriously wounded in an enemy machine gun ambush. Gabaldon claimed he was credited with the capture of approximately 1,500 Japanese soldiers and civilians on Saipan and Tinian and was recommended for the Medal of Honor by his commanding officer Captain John Schwabe, who noted that Gabaldon single-handedly captured more than ten times the number of prisoners taken by legendary Medal of Honor recipient, Sgt. Alvin C. York, in World War I. Despite this recommendation, Gabaldon was awarded a Silver Star Medal.

== Post-war ==
Gabaldon received an honorable discharge from the Marine Corps as a result of his combat wounds. In 1960, the Marine Corps elevated his Silver Star Medal to the Navy Cross, the second highest US military decoration for valor.

After returning to civilian life, he moved to Mexico and ventured into various businesses such as a furniture store, fishing, and the import-export of Mexican goods. When his first marriage to June Gabaldon ended in divorce, he met the woman who became his second wife, Ohana Suzuki, while working in Mexico.

External videos
- You can view a film clip from Guy Gabaldon's life story "Hell To Eternity" on YouTube.

Gabaldon's World War II exploits became public when in 1957, he was the invited guest of This Is Your Life, a popular television program aired by NBC in the 1950s. Hosted by Ralph Edwards, the show presented the life stories of entertainment personalities and "ordinary" people who had contributed in some way to society. Later, Gabaldon appeared as himself on the September 1, 1960 episode of the CBS game show To Tell the Truth.

The fact that Gabaldon captured at least 1,500 Japanese prisoners was verified on the national program by Marines Corps intelligence officers Colonel Walter Layer, Colonel John Schwabe, Major James High, and several enlisted men from military intelligence.

Hollywood producers became interested in Gabaldon's story and in 1960 released the film Hell to Eternity where his actions on Saipan were memorialized. He was portrayed by actors Jeffrey Hunter as an adult and by Richard Eyer as a boy. Gabaldon himself served as an adviser in the filming of the movie.

== Later years ==
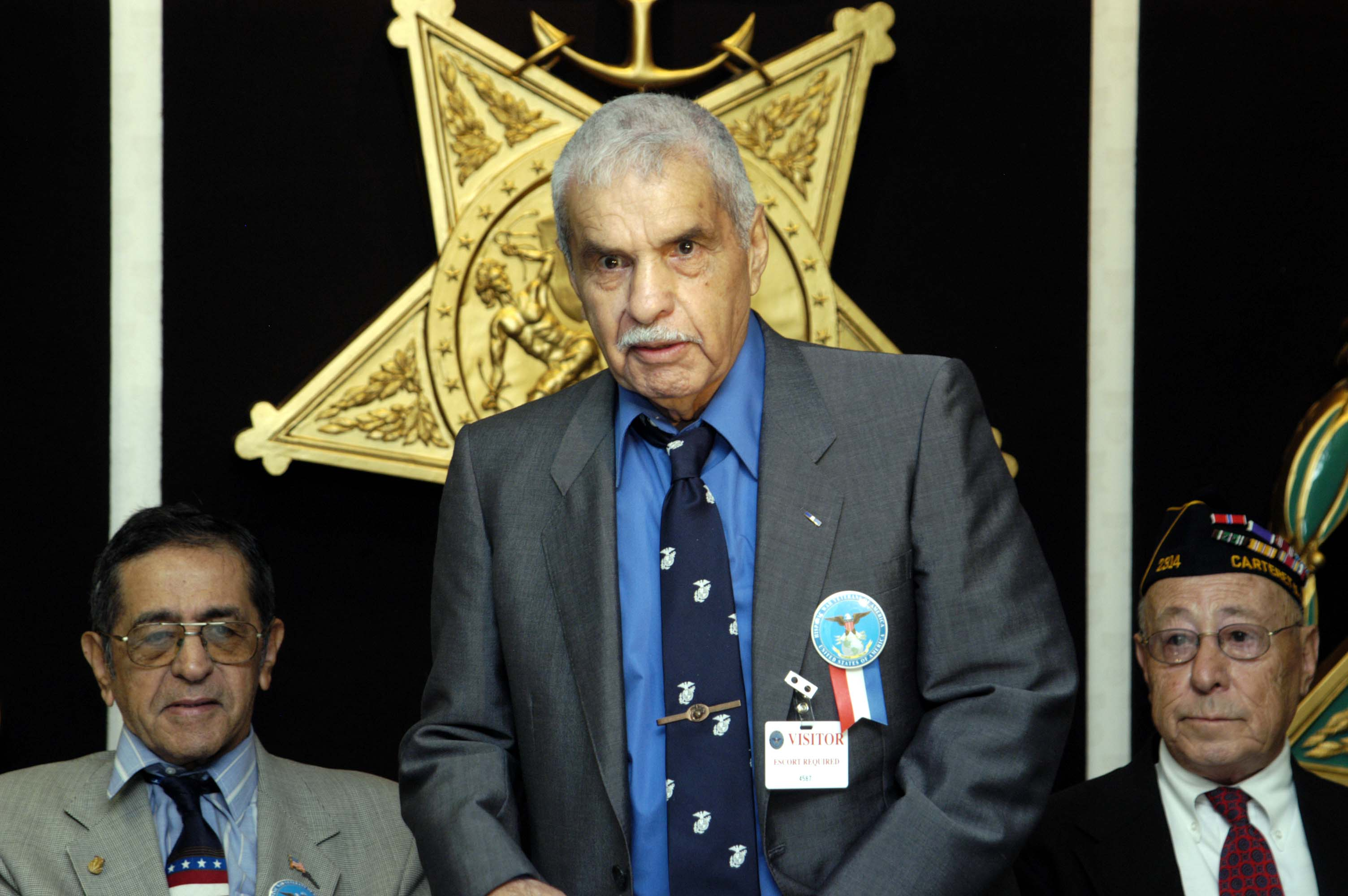
Guy Gabaldon speaking at Pentagon ceremony honoring Hispanic World War II veterans, September 2004.

In 1964, Gabaldon unsuccessfully ran for the United States Congress as a Republican in California.

In 1970, he moved to Saipan with his wife where he established a seafood business and ran a youth camp. He lived there for 20 years. He was an avid pilot and flew small planes all over the CNMI.

In 1990, he authored and self-published a book; Saipan: Suicide Island, where he recounted his exploits on Saipan. Including the time he acquired a Harley-Davidson motorcycle from three Japanese soldiers, the event was of enough significance to Guy, he wrote about it in detail in his memoirs. His book has also been re-printed as America Betrayed.

In 1995, he returned to California.

In 2003, he moved to Old Town, Florida.

In September 2004, Gabaldon was honored by the Pentagon, in a ceremony which recognized the contributions of Hispanic American World War II veterans.

Various organizations have requested the Medal of Honor for Gabaldon, but their requests have been rejected. After lobbying by the Hispanic community, the case to upgrade his Navy Cross to the Medal of Honor is currently under review by the Department of Defense.

== Death ==
On August 31, 2006, Gabaldon died in Old Town, Florida, of heart disease. He was buried with full military honors at Arlington National Cemetery. Gabaldon is survived by his wife, Ohana; his sons Guy Jr., Ray, Tony, Yoshio, Jeffrey and Russell; his daughters Aiko, Hanako and Manya. Two members of his "adopted" family were actor Lane Nakano and his twin Lyle.

== Awards and recognitions ==
External videos
- You can view a newsreel of Guy Gabaldon receiving the Navy Cross Medal on YouTube

During his lifetime, Gabaldon received many awards and recognitions, including resolutions honoring him from the City of Los Angeles, the City of Chicago, and the Commonwealth of Northern Marianas.

On November 12, 2005, he was the recipient of the Chesty Puller Award from the World War II Veterans Committee, a prominent organization which showcases the veterans of World War II and their history.

On July 7, 2006, he was honored by Mayor Antonio Villaraigosa of Los Angeles and the Los Angeles City Council. The Mayor and the city council sent a resolution to the White House requesting the Medal of Honor for Gabaldon. That same year the World War II Veteran's Committee in Washington, D.C., featured Gabaldon on the cover of their quarterly magazine. Also in July, Gabaldon was honored by the National Council of La Raza, a national organization and a leading Latino civil rights advocate.

In addition to the Hollywood movie Hell to Eternity, which recounted Gabaldon's heroism during World War II, Hollywood producer Steve Rubin made a 2008 documentary film about Gabaldon titled East L.A. Marine: The Untold True Story of Guy Gabaldon. Military artist Henry Godines also unveiled a commissioned portrait, titled The Pied Piper of Saipan, Guy Gabaldon.

=== Navy Cross citation ===
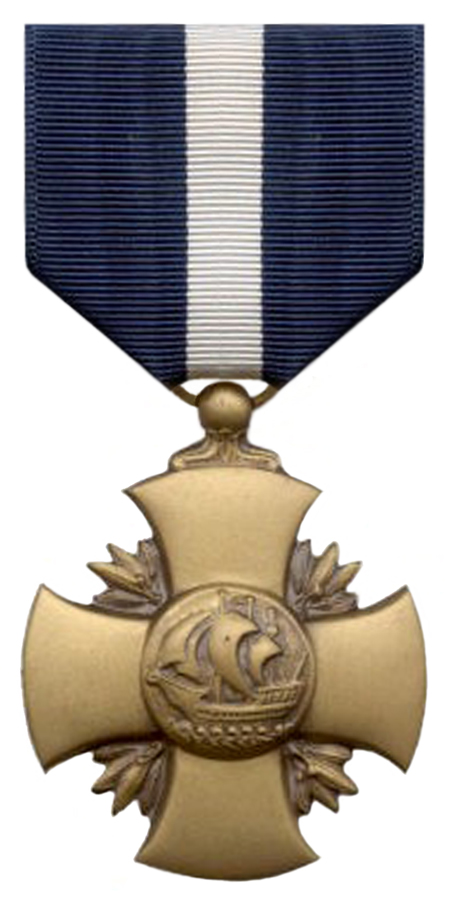

THE SECRETARY OF THE NAVY
Citation:

The President of the United States takes pleasure in presenting the NAVY CROSS to

PRIVATE FIRST CLASS GUY L. GABALDON
UNITED STATES MARINE CORPS RESERVE

for service as set forth in the following

CITATION:

For extraordinary heroism while serving with Headquarters and Service Company, Second Marines, Second Marine Division, in action against enemy Japanese forces on Saipan and Tinian, Mariana Islands, South Pacific Area, from 15 June to 1 August 1944. Acting as a Japanese Interpreter for the Second Marines, Private First Class GABALDON displayed extreme courage and initiative in single-handedly capturing enemy civilian and military personnel during the Saipan and Tinian operations. Working alone in front of the lines, he daringly entered enemy caves, pillboxes, buildings, and jungle brush, frequently in the face of hostile fire, and succeeded in not only obtaining vital military information, but in capturing well over one thousand enemy civilians and troops. Through his valiant and distinguished exploits, Private First Class GABALDON made an important contribution to the successful prosecution of the Campaign and, through his efforts, a definite humane treatment of civilian prisoners was assured. His courageous and inspiring devotion to duty throughout reflects the highest credit upon himself and the United States Naval Service.

For the President,
W. B. FRANKE,
Secretary of the Navy

(Approved by the Secretary of the Navy on November 23, 1960)

.

== Military awards and decorations ==
Gabaldon's military awards include:

| Navy Cross | Purple Heart Medal | Combat Action Ribbon |
| American Campaign Medal | Asiatic-Pacific Campaign Medal with two 3/16 bronze stars | World War II Victory Medal |

== See also ==
- Hispanic Americans in World War II
- List of historic United States Marines
- Hispanics in the United States Marine Corps
