= Desmond Nakano =

American screenwriter and film director (born 1953)

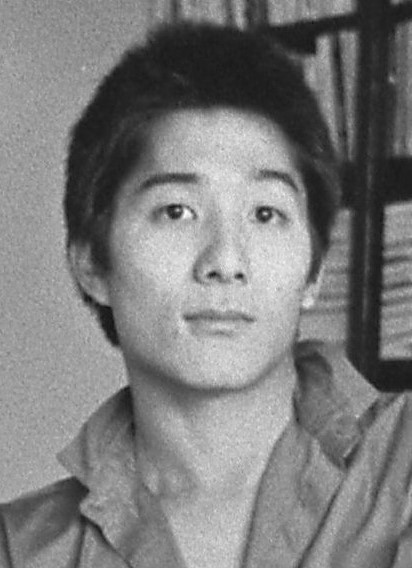
- Nakano in 1980
- Born: 1953 (age 71–72); United States
- Occupation(s): Screenwriter, film director
- Years active: 1979–present
- Spouse: Candice Carella (m. 2006)
- Children: 2
- Parent: Lane Nakano

Desmond Nakano (born 1953) is an American screenwriter and film director. He is Sansei, or third-generation Japanese American. He directed the feature films White Man's Burden (1995) and American Pastime (2007). His writing credits include the screenplays for the dramatic feature films Last Exit to Brooklyn (1989) and American Me (1992).

== Filmography ==
=== Films ===
Year	Film	Credit	Notes
1978	The Kid from Not-So-Big	Written By	
1979	Boulevard Nights	Written By	
1984	Body Rock	Screenplay By, Story By, Associate Director	Co-Wrote Story with Kimberly Lynn White
1986	Black Moon Rising	Screenplay By	Co-Wrote Screenplay with John Carpenter and William Gray
1989	Last Exit to Brooklyn	Screenplay By	Based on the Novel by Hubert Selby Jr.
1992	American Me	Screenplay By	Co-Wrote Screenplay with Floyd Mutrux
1995	White Man's Burden	Written By, Directed By	
2007	American Pastime	Written By, Directed By	Co-Wrote Screenplay with Tony Kayden
2018	Three Days in the Hole	Written By	Co-Wrote with Candice Carella
