= Don Taylor (American filmmaker) =

American actor and director (1920–1998)

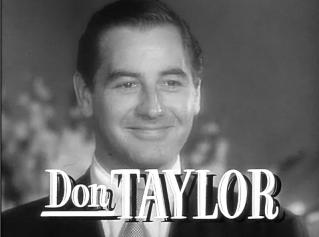
- Don Taylor in Father's Little Dividend (1951)
- Born: Donald Ritchie Taylor; December 13, 1920; Freeport, Pennsylvania, U.S.
- Died: December 29, 1998 (aged 78); Los Angeles, California, U.S.
- Occupations: Actor and film director
- Years active: 1943–88
- Spouses: Phyllis Avery (m. 1944; div. 1955) Hazel Court (m. 1964)
- Children: 4
- Relatives: Stephen Morehouse Avery (father-in-law)

Donald Ritchie Taylor (December 13, 1920 – December 29, 1998) was an American actor and film director. He co-starred in 1940s and 1950s classics, including the 1948 film noir The Naked City, Battleground, Father of the Bride, Father's Little Dividend and Stalag 17. He later turned to directing films such as Escape from the Planet of the Apes (1971), Tom Sawyer (1973), Echoes of a Summer (1976), and Damien - Omen II (1978).

== Biography ==
=== Early life and work ===
The son of Mr. and Mrs. D. E. Taylor, Donald Ritchie Taylor was born in Freeport, Pennsylvania on December 13, 1920. (Another source says that he was born "in Pittsburgh and raised in Freeport, Pa.") He studied speech and drama at Penn State University and hitchhiked to Hollywood in 1942. He was signed as a contract player at Metro-Goldwyn-Mayer and appeared in small roles. Drafted into the United States Army Air Forces (AAF) during World War II, he appeared in the Air Forces' Winged Victory Broadway play and movie (1944), credited as "Cpl. Don Taylor."

=== Acting career ===
After discharge from the AAF, Taylor was cast in a lead role as the young detective, Jimmy Halloran, working alongside veteran homicide detective Dan Muldoon (Barry Fitzgerald) in Universal's 1948 screen version of The Naked City, which was notable for being filmed entirely on location in New York. Taylor was later part of the ensemble cast in MGM's classic World War II drama Battleground (1949). He then appeared as the husband of Elizabeth Taylor in the comedies Father of the Bride (1950) and its sequel Father's Little Dividend (1951), starring Spencer Tracy. Another memorable role was Vern "Cowboy" Blithe in Flying Leathernecks (1951). In 1952, Taylor played a soldier bringing his Japanese war-bride back to small-town America in Japanese War Bride. In 1953, Taylor had a key role as the escaping prisoner Lt. Dunbar in Billy Wilder's Stalag 17, and starred as Robin Hood in the following year's The Men of Sherwood Forest from future horror pioneers Hammer Films. His last major film role came in I'll Cry Tomorrow (1955), although he continued to occasionally act for television into the early 60s.

=== Directorial career ===
From the late 1950s through the 1980s, Taylor turned to directing movies and TV shows, such as Alfred Hitchcock Presents, the short-lived Steve Canyon, starring Dean Fredericks, and Rod Serling's Night Gallery. One of his memorable efforts, in 1973, was the musical film Tom Sawyer, which boasted a Sherman Brothers song score. Other films that Taylor directed are Escape from the Planet of the Apes (1971), Echoes of a Summer (1976), The Great Scout & Cathouse Thursday (also 1976), The Island of Dr. Moreau (1977) starring Burt Lancaster, Damien - Omen II (1978) with William Holden, and The Final Countdown (1980) with Kirk Douglas.

Taylor occasionally performed both acting and directing roles simultaneously, as he did for episodes of the TV detective series Burke's Law.

=== Writing career ===
Taylor "wrote one-act plays, radio dramas, short stories, and the 1985 TV movie My Wicked, Wicked Ways: The Legend of Errol Flynn.

=== Personal life ===
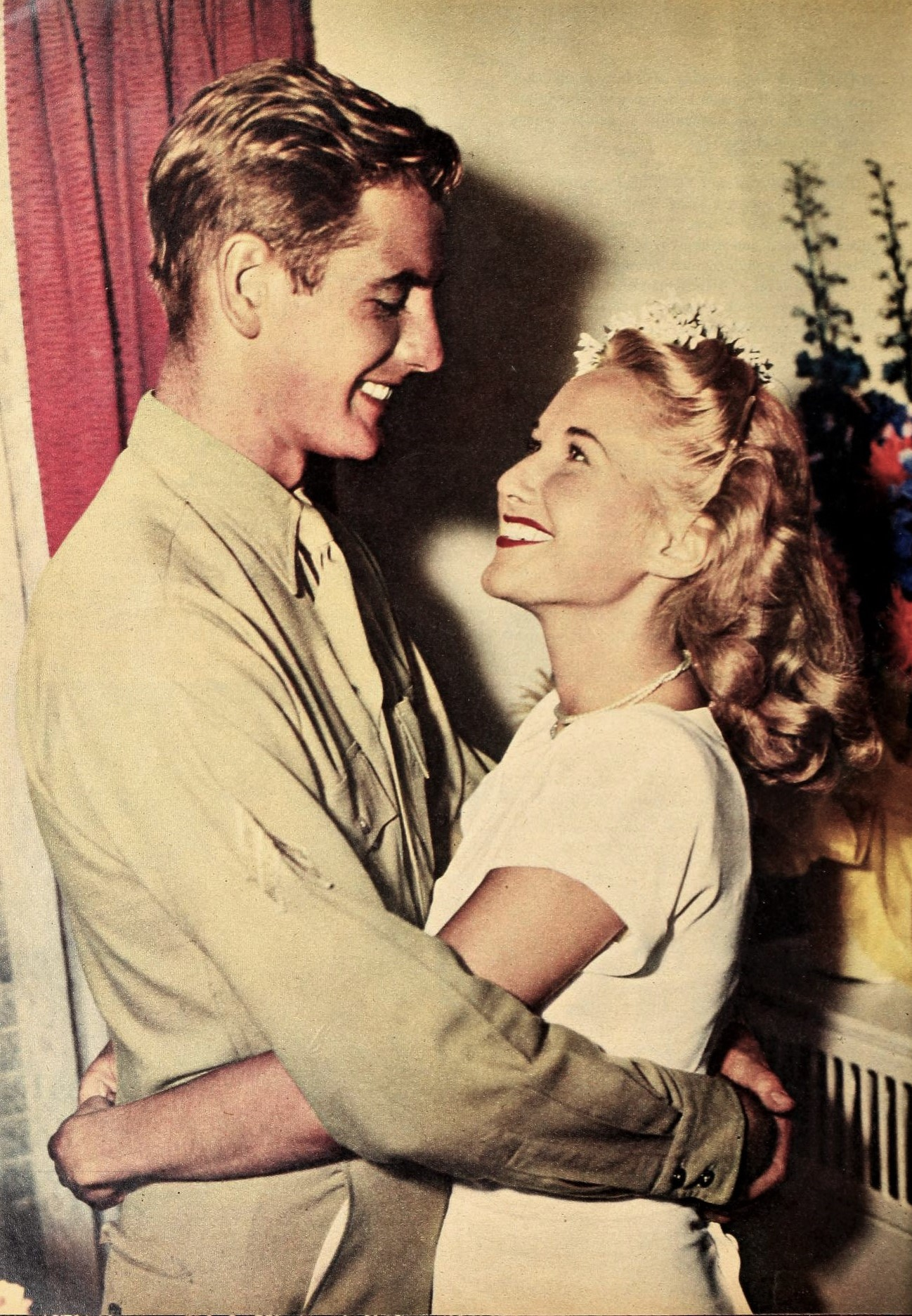
Don Taylor with Phyllis Avery, 1946

Taylor was married twice.

- His first wife was Phyllis Avery, whom he married in 1944; they divorced in 1955, but not before the births of their daughters Anne and Avery.
- His second wife was Hazel Court, whom he married in 1964 and stayed with until his death; they had a son, Jonathan, and a daughter, Courtney.

==== Death ====
Taylor died on December 29, 1998, at the University of California Medical Center in Los Angeles, California, of heart failure.

== Awards ==
- Nominee, Best Director – Saturn Awards (The Island of Dr. Moreau) (1977)
- Nominee, Best Director-Comedy – Emmy Awards (The Farmer's Daughter) (1963)

== Selected filmography as director ==
In addition to his Hollywood credits, Taylor directed 27 television movies and episodes for 53 television series including Alfred Hitchcock Presents, The Big Valley, Burke's Law, Cannon, Checkmate, The Dick Powell Theatre, Dr. Kildare, 87th Precinct, The Farmer's Daughter, The Flying Nun, Honky Tonk, It Takes a Thief, The Lloyd Bridges Show, The Mod Squad, Rod Serling's Night Gallery, The Rogues, The Rifleman, The Tammy Grimes Show, Vacation Playhouse, The Wild Wild West, Zane Grey Theater, and others.

- Everything's Ducky (1961)
- Ride the Wild Surf (1964)
- Jack of Diamonds (1967)
- The Five Man Army (1969)
- Escape from the Planet of the Apes (1971)
- Tom Sawyer (1973)
- Echoes of a Summer (1976)
- The Great Scout & Cathouse Thursday (1976)
- The Island of Dr. Moreau (1977)
- Damien - Omen II (1978)
- The Final Countdown (1980)
- The Diamond Trap (1988)

== Selected filmography as actor ==
Year	Title	Role	Notes
1943	The Human Comedy	Soldier	Uncredited
1943	Salute to the Marines	Brooks - Marine at Bridge	Uncredited
1943	Swing Shift Maisie	Young Pilot	Uncredited
1943	Thousands Cheer	Soldier at Train Station	Uncredited
1943	Girl Crazy	Student	Uncredited
1944	Winged Victory	Danny 'Pinkie' Scariano	
1947	Song of the Thin Man	Buddy Hollis	
1948	The Naked City	Detective Jimmy Halloran	
1948	For the Love of Mary	David Paxton	
1949	Battleground	Standiferd	
1950	Ambush	Lieutenant Linus Delaney	
1950	Father of the Bride	Buckley Dunstan	
1951	Submarine Command	Lieutenant Peter Morris	
1951	Father's Little Dividend	Buckley Dunstan	
1951	The Flying Leathernecks	Lieutenant Vern 'Cowboy' Blithe	
1951	The Blue Veil	Dr. Robert Palfrey	
1951	Submarine Command	Lieutenant Commander Peter Morris	
1952	Japanese War Bride	Captain Jim Sterling	
1953	Destination Gobi	Jenkins	
1953	The Girls of Pleasure Island	Lieutenant Jimmy Gilmartin	
1953	Stalag 17	Lieutenant James Schuyler Dunbar	
1954	Johnny Dark	Duke Benson	
1954	The Men of Sherwood Forest	Robin Hood	
1955	I'll Cry Tomorrow	Wallie	
1956	The Bold and the Brave	Sergeant Ewald 'Preacher' Wollaston	
1956	Ride the High Iron	Sergeant Hugo Danielchik	
1957	Alfred Hitchcock Presents	Professor Donald Mason	Season 3 Episode 5: "Silent Witness"
1957	Love Slaves of the Amazons	Dr. Peter Masters	
1961	Savage Guns	Mike Summers	
1969	The Five Man Army	Poker Player	Uncredited (final film role)
