= John Dunning (film editor) =

American film editor (1916–1991)

- Born: May 5, 1916; Los Angeles, California, United States
- Died: February 25, 1991 (aged 74); Santa Monica, California, United States
- Occupation: Film editor

John D. Dunning (May 5, 1916 – February 25, 1991) was an American film editor who worked on several large-scale Hollywood movies from 1947 to 1970. He was an editor contracted to MGM Studios. While working with MGM, Dunning was picked by the famed director Frank Capra to collorabate with him on a World War II series of seven patriotic films for the American public, collectively called Why We Fight, produced from 1942 to 1945. This early relation with Capra honed his skills with a talented director and brought him to the professional recognition in the film world.

This recognition proved fruitful when the low-budget war film Battleground became a sleeper hit in 1949, earning critical praise and several Oscar nominations, including one for Best Film Editing.

Dunning worked on the remake of Show Boat (1951); Joseph L. Mankiewicz's Julius Caesar, an adaptation of Shakespeare's play (1953); and the Southern epic Raintree County (1957). In 1959 he won an Oscar for Best Film Editing, shared with Ralph E. Winters, for Ben-Hur.

Dunning then moved to television, where he edited The Man from U.N.C.L.E..

Dunning retired in 1970. He was married to Ruth Dunning (née Danson). Together they had three children, John Dunning, Robert Dunning and Barbara Dunning. After Dunning retired, he and son Robert ran a winery in Paso Robles, California, Dunning Vineyards, which Robert began on his father's property in Malibu. Barbara Dunning followed her father into the editing business, working as a freelance editor on films such as Cocktail, Green Card and Die Hard 2.

At Dunning's funeral in 1991, Frank Capra and the senior staff of MGM were there to pay their respects.

== Selected filmography ==
Editor
Year	Film	Director	Notes
1947	This Time for Keeps	Richard Thorpe	
1947	Cass Timberlane	George Sidney	First collaboration with George Sidney
1948	Homecoming	Mervyn LeRoy	
1948	Julia Misbehaves	Jack Conway	
1949	Battleground	William A. Wellman	First collaboration with William A. Wellman
1950	The Next Voice You Hear...	William A. Wellman	Second collaboration with William A. Wellman
1950	The Happy Years	William A. Wellman	Third collaboration with William A. Wellman
1951	Show Boat	George Sidney	Second collaboration with George Sidney
1951	Across the Wide Missouri	William A. Wellman	Fourth collaboration with William A. Wellman
1952	The Wild North	Andrew Marton	
1952	My Man and I	William A. Wellman	Fifth collaboration with William A. Wellman
1953	Julius Caesar	Joseph L. Mankiewicz	
1953	Take the High Ground!	Richard Brooks	First collaboration with Richard Brooks
1954	Rhapsody	Charles Vidor	First collaboration with Charles Vidor
1954	Betrayed	Gottfried Reinhardt	
1954	The Last Time I Saw Paris	Richard Brooks	Second collaboration with Richard Brooks
1955	Interrupted Melody	Curtis Bernhardt	
1955	The Tender Trap	Charles Walters	
1955	It's a Dog's Life	Herman Hoffman	
1956	The Swan	Charles Vidor	Second collaboration with Charles Vidor
1957	Raintree County	Edward Dmytryk	
1958	The Brothers Karamazov	Richard Brooks	Third collaboration with Richard Brooks
1959	Ben-Hur	William Wyler	
1960	Cimarron	Anthony Mann	

Editorial department
Year	Film	Director	Role	Notes
1965	The Spy with My Face	John Newland	Supervising film editor	Uncredited
1966	One of Our Spies Is Missing	E. Darrell Hallenbeck	Supervising film editor	

Short documentaries

Editorial department
Year	Film	Director	Role
1968	Rowan & Martin at the Movies	Jack Arnold	Editorial supervisor

TV movies

Editor
Year	Film	Director
1970	The Mask of Sheba	David Lowell Rich

TV pilots

Editor
Year	Film	Director
1965	Dream Wife	Don Taylor
1966	Meet Me in St. Louis	Alan D. Courtney; Jeffrey Hayden

TV series

Editor
Year	Title	Notes
1961	Father of the Bride	1 episode
1962	Sam Benedict	2 episodes
1963	The Eleventh Hour	1 episode
1969−70	Medical Center	25 episodes

Editorial department
Year	Title	Role	Notes
1961	The Asphalt Jungle	Supervising film editor	12 episodes
1961−62	Cain's Hundred	Supervising film editor	30 episodes
1962−63	Sam Benedict	Supervising film editor	26 episodes
1962−63	The Eleventh Hour	Supervising editor; Supervising film editor	20 episodes
1963−64	The Travels of Jaimie McPheeters	Supervising film editor	26 episodes
1963−64	The Lieutenant	Supervising film editor	29 episodes
1963−65	Mr. Novak	Supervising film editor	60 episodes
1961−66	Dr. Kildare	Supervising film editor	191 episodes
1964−66	Flipper	Editorial supervisor; Supervising film editor	59 episodes
1965−66	A Man Called Shenandoah	Supervising editor; Supervising film editor	29 episodes
1966−67	Jericho	Supervising film editor	16 episodes
1966−67	The Girl from U.N.C.L.E.	Supervising editor; Supervising film editor	27 episodes
1965−67	Please Don't Eat the Daisies	Supervising film editor	58 episodes
1967	Hondo	Supervising editor	17 episodes
1964−68	The Man from U.N.C.L.E.	Supervising film editor	105 episodes
1969	Then Came Bronson	Supervising film editor	7 episodes
1969	Medical Center	Supervising film editor	1 episode
1969−70	The Courtship of Eddie's Father	Assistant editor; Supervising editor; Supervising film editor	25 episodes
