= Japanese War Bride =

1952 film by King Vidor

- Promotional release poster
- Directed by: King Vidor
- Written by: Anson Bond (story); Catherine Turney (screenplay)
- Produced by: Joseph Bernhard; Anson Bond
- Starring: Shirley Yamaguchi; Don Taylor
- Cinematography: Lionel Lindon
- Edited by: Terry O. Morse
- Music by: Arthur Lange; Emil Newman
- Distributed by: Twentieth Century-Fox
- Release dates: December 31, 1951 (Detroit); January 29, 1952 (New York)
- Running time: 91 minutes
- Country: United States
- Language: English

Japanese War Bride (also known as East Is East) is a 1952 American drama film directed by King Vidor. The film features the American debut of Shirley Yamaguchi in the title role.

== Plot ==
Wounded Korean War veteran Jim Sterling returns to his California home with his Japanese wife Tae Shimizu. The couple had met and fallen in love in a Japanese hospital where Tae was working as a nurse. In the United States, the couple face racism and bigotry from their neighbors and family, particularly from Jim's sister-in-law Fran.

== Cast ==
- Shirley Yamaguchi as Tae Shimizu
- Don Taylor as Jim Sterling
- Cameron Mitchell as Art Sterling
- Marie Windsor as Fran Sterling
- James Bell as Ed Sterling
- Louise Lorimer as Harriet Sterling
- Philip Ahn as Eitaro Shimizu
- Lane Nakano as Shiro Hasagawa
- May Takasugi as Emma Hasagawa
- Sybil Merritt as Emily Shafer
- Orley Lindgren as Ted Sterling
- George Wallace as Woody Blacker
- Kathleen Mulqueen as Milly Shafer

== Reception ==
In a contemporary review for The New York Times, critic A. H. Weiler wrote: "King Vidor has directed the drama inherent in the stress attendant on the homecoming of one such young couple without imagination despite a story that does make a perfectly valid plea for understanding. ... Credit the producers with indicating that hostility is not a hard and fast rule. But a suspicion of soap opera does creep in as a jealous sister-in-law tries, via a poison pen letter to indicate that that child of the marriage was sired by a Japanese neighbor. And, the final denouement and reconciliation is hardly above the standard of its approach."

== Legacy ==
The widespread publicity surrounding the film's launch may have increased the visibility of Japanese wives in the United States. Some scholars have commented that the film, along with The Teahouse of the August Moon (1956) and Sayonara (1957), improved racial tolerance by openly discussing interracial marriages.

In February 2020, the film was shown at the 70th Berlin International Film Festival as part of a retrospective dedicated to King Vidor's career.
