= Battleground (film) =

1949 film directed by William A. Wellman

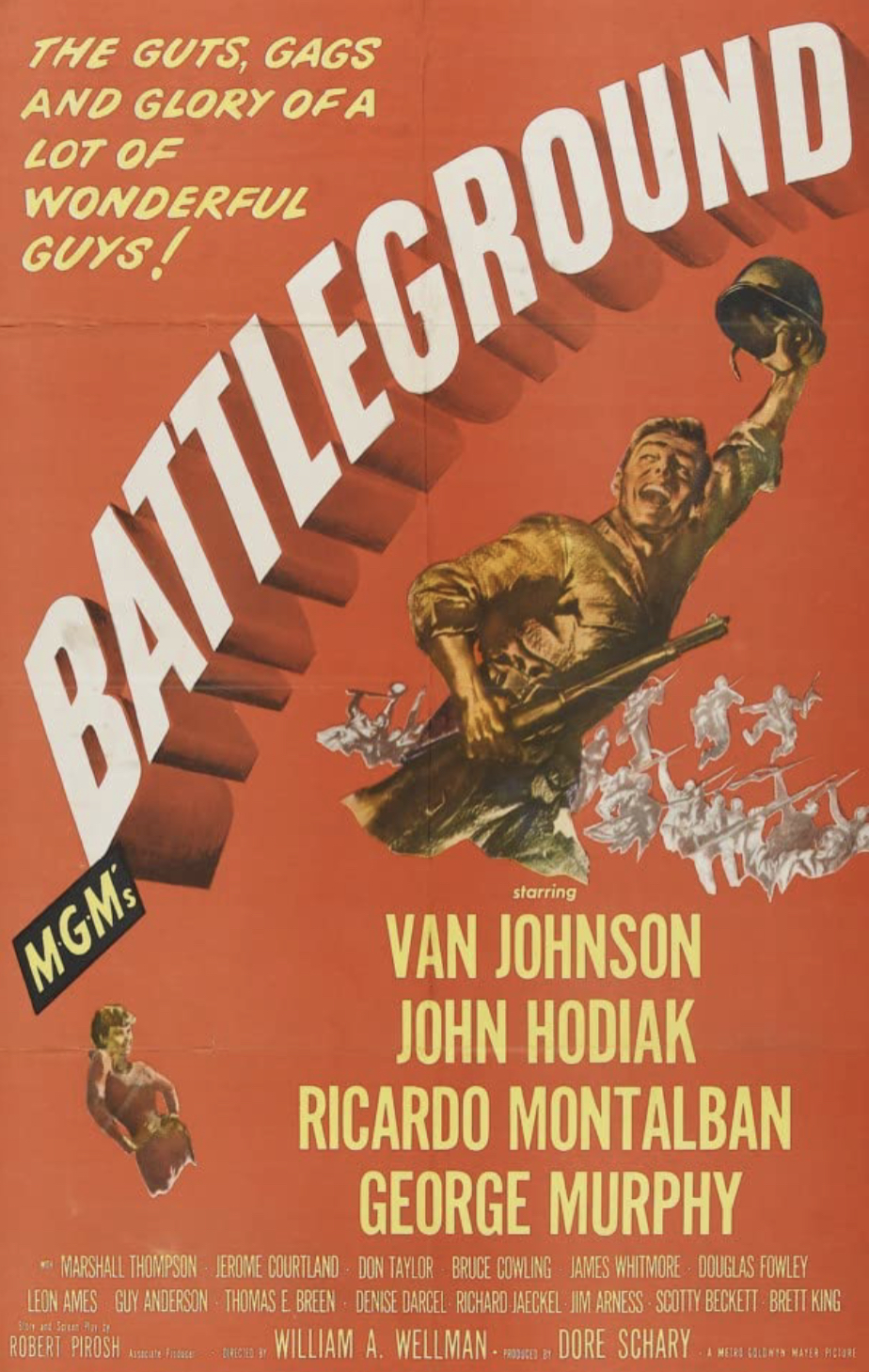
- Official film poster
- Directed by: William A. Wellman
- Written by: Robert Pirosh
- Produced by: Dore Schary
- Starring: Van Johnson; John Hodiak; Ricardo Montalbán; George Murphy
- Cinematography: Paul C. Vogel
- Edited by: John D. Dunning
- Music by: Lennie Hayton
- Production company: Metro-Goldwyn-Mayer
- Distributed by: Metro-Goldwyn-Mayer
- Release dates: November 9, 1949 (Washington D.C., premiere)
- Running time: 118 minutes
- Country: United States
- Language: English
- Budget: $1,631,000
- Box office: $6,269,000 (worldwide rentals)

Battleground is a 1949 American war film directed by William A. Wellman and starring Van Johnson, John Hodiak, Ricardo Montalbán, George Murphy, and James Whitmore. It follows a fictional company of the 327th Glider Infantry Regiment, 101st Airborne Division as they fight in the siege of Bastogne during the Battle of the Bulge, in World War II. The screenplay was written by Robert Pirosh, based on his own experiences during the battle.

The film portrays American soldiers as vulnerable and human. While they remain steadfast and courageous, each soldier has at least one moment in the film when he seriously considers running away, schemes to get sent back from the front line, slacks off, or complains about the situation he is in. One writer – disregarding Warner's successful Fighter Squadron of 1948 – describes Battleground as the first significant American film about World War II to be made and released after the end of the war.

Battleground premiered in Washington, D.C. on November 9, 1949, and was distributed in the United States by Metro-Goldwyn-Mayer. A widespread critical and commercial success, the film won Best Story and Screenplay (Pirosh) and Best Cinematography – Black-and-White (Paul C. Vogel) at the 22nd Academy Awards, out of six total nominations, including Best Picture and Best Director for Wellman. James Whitmore, for his second-ever film role, was nominated for an Oscar and won a Golden Globe Award for his performance.

The film was nominated for the American Film Institute's 2001 list AFI's 100 Years...100 Thrills.

== Plot ==
In mid-December 1944, Privates Jim Layton and William J. Hooper are assigned to the 327th Glider Infantry Regiment, 101st Airborne Division. As a newcomer, Layton receives a chilly welcome from his squad. Private First Class Holley returns to the company after recuperating from a wound. Instead of going on leave in Paris, the squad is trucked back to the front because of a surprise German breakthrough in the Ardennes. They stop in Bastogne and are billeted in the apartment of a young woman, Denise, to whom Holley is attracted. Jarvess stands guard and encounters battle-weary soldiers retreating through the town. Platoon Sergeant Kinnie leads them to the outskirts of town the next morning to dig defensive emplacements, but before they can finish are redeployed and begin digging again.

German soldiers disguised as Americans infiltrate their position during the night and blow up a nearby bridge. In the morning, Roderigues, a Latino from Los Angeles, is delighted by the novelty of snow from a heavy winter storm, but "Pop" Stazak, awaiting a dependency discharge, is unimpressed. Layton finds Hooper has been killed, and no one in his company had even known his name.

Kinnie informs the squad about the infiltration and dispatches Holley, Roderigues, and Jarvess on a patrol. Bettis panics and deserts when the platoon is shelled by German artillery. The patrol briefly skirmishes with the infiltrators and Roderigues is wounded by machine-gun fire from an enemy tank. Holley conceals him under a disabled jeep half-buried in snow, promising to come back for him, but Roderigues dies by the time he returns. Sergeant Wolowicz, wounded by shrapnel, and a sick Corporal Standiferd are sent to a field hospital. Later, Doc informs the 2nd Squad that the hospital has been captured. Holley becomes the new squad leader. Pop's discharge arrives, but since Bastogne is surrounded he's unable to leave.

The 3rd Platoon is attacked at dawn and nearly overrun. Hansan is wounded and Holley flees with Layton following. Ashamed, Holley turns around and leads a flanking counterattack that stops the Germans, but is unable to prevent Abner Spudler and Garby from being killed. The squad takes Hanson to an aid station and encounter Bettis doing field kitchen duty, and Layton being entertained by Denise.

Back on the line, they find themselves short of supplies because bad weather has grounded the supply transport aircraft. Germans approach under a flag of truce to offer Brigadier General McAuliffe surrender terms; his famous reply - "Nuts!" - puzzles the Germans. Several men attend impromptu outdoor Christmas services held by a chaplain who gives a short speech on the importance of the fight against fascism, asking "The 64 dollar question is: was this trip necessary?” He assures them it was, and tells them "don't let anyone ever tell you that you were a sucker to fight against fascism."

That night, Denise is killed when the Luftwaffe bombs Bastogne and Bettis, hesitant to return to the lines, dies under a collapsing house. The walking wounded, including Hansan and a mess sergeant, are recalled for a last-ditch defense of the town. With the platoon down to its last rounds of ammunition, the weather clears, allowing Allied fighter aircraft to attack the Germans and C-47 transports to drop supplies, enabling the 101st to hold. Kinnie leads the platoon's survivors rearward for a well-earned rest.

== Cast ==
Credits from the AFI Catalog of Feature Films:

- Van Johnson as PFC. Holley
- John Hodiak as PVT. Donald Jarvess
- Ricardo Montalbán as PVT. Johnny Roderigues
- George Murphy as PVT. Ernest J. "Pop" Stazak
- Marshall Thompson as PVT. Jim Layton
- Jerome Courtland as PVT. Abner Spudler
- Don Taylor as CPL. Standiferd
- Bruce Cowling as SGT. Wolowicz
- James Whitmore as SSGT. Kinnie
- Douglas Fowley as PVT. "Kipp" Kippton
- Leon Ames as the Chaplain
- Herbert Anderson as PVT. Hansan
- Thomas E. Breen as Doc
- Denise Darcel as Denise
- Richard Jaeckel as PVT. Bettis
- James Arness as SGT. Garby
- Scotty Beckett as PVT. William J. Hooper
- Brett King as LT. Teiss
- Ian MacDonald as Colonel
- John Mylong as German Major
- Ivan Triesault as German Captain
- Roland Varno as German Lieutenant
- Jerry Paris as German Sergeant
- Henry Rowland as German NCO
- Jean Del Val as French Civilian

=== Casting notes ===
Several of the cast members had served in the U.S. armed forces during World War II: Jerome Courtland served in the Army in the Pacific Theatre, Don Taylor served in the Army Air Forces, James Whitmore was a 2nd Lieutenant with the 4th Marine Division in Saipan, Douglas Fowley served in the Navy, Richard Jaeckal was in the Merchant Marine from 1944 to 1946, James Arness served in the 7th Infantry Regiment of the Army and received a Bronze Star and Purple Heart for actions during the Battle of Anzio, Brett King served in the Army Air Forces and received both a Purple Heart and the Distinguished Flying Cross.

Neville Brand, a veteran of the 83rd Infantry Division and Silver Star recipient, made his film debut with an uncredited minor role, playing a soldier singing "Santa Claus Is Comin' to Town". Dewey Martin, likewise in a bit role as a G.I., was a fighter pilot in the Pacific Theater and a prisoner-of-war.

== Historical accuracy ==
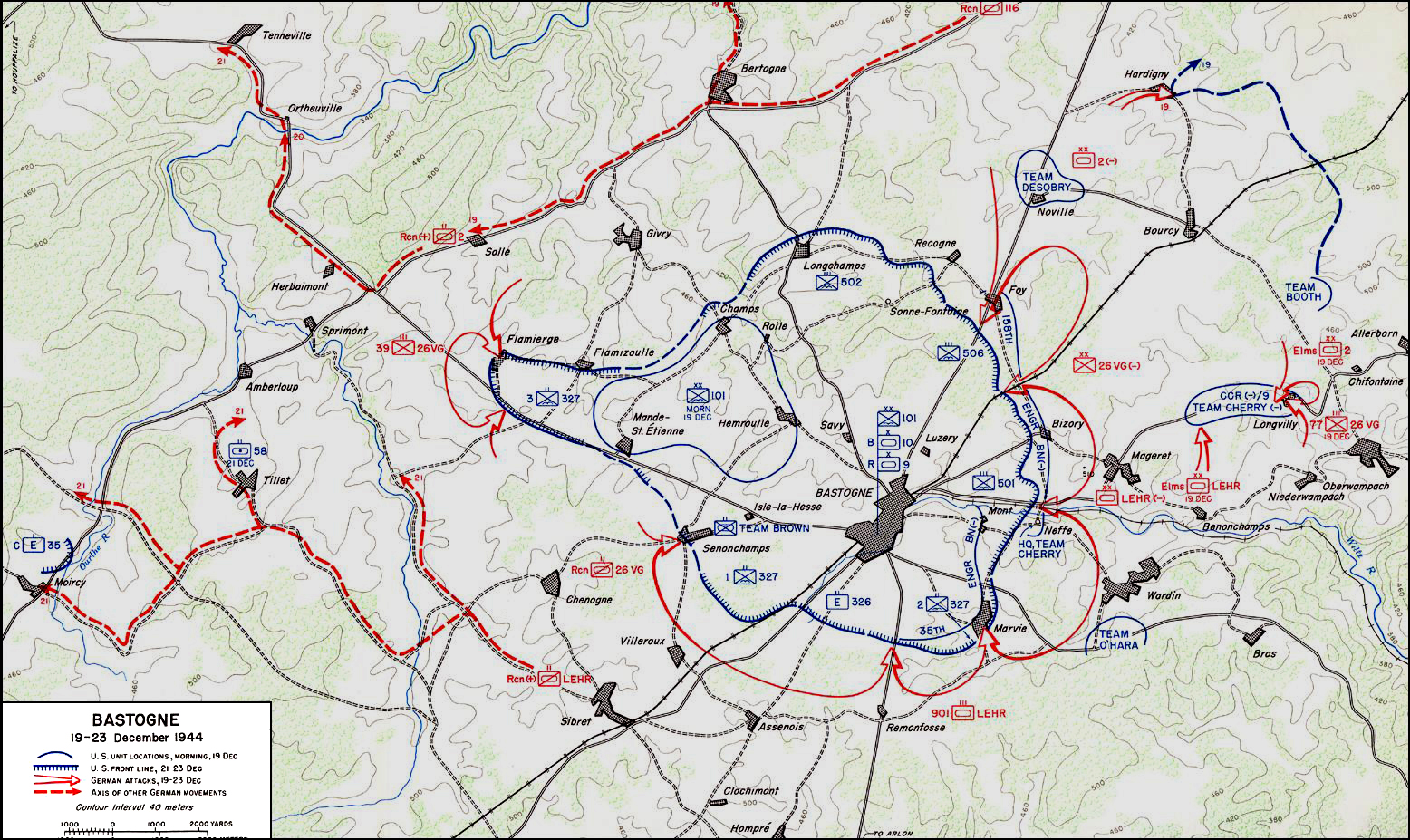
The 327th Glider Infantry Regiment held the western perimeter during the siege of Bastogne.

Although the film is a fictionalized version of the siege of Bastogne, there were no Germans disguised as Americans GIs operating around Bastogne. Operation Greif only focused on the front of the 6th Panzer Army, many miles to the north. The scenes depicting US troops quizzing each other about their culture (like sports and films) to verify they were not German infiltrators did occur once news of the operation became known.

The unit portrayed in the film is the fictional "2nd Squad, 3rd Platoon of Item Company" of the real 327th Glider Infantry Regiment, 101st Airborne Division. The 327th Glider Infantry Regiment never had an Item Company. When the airborne divisions were conceived early in World War II, glider regiments were given two battalions; the first had companies named Able, Baker, Charlie, and Dog while the second got Easy, Fox, George, and How. The 327th held the western perimeter of Bastogne.

== Production ==
=== Background ===
Robert Pirosh had based the script on his own experiences during the Battle of the Bulge, although he did not serve with the 101st Airborne, but with the 35th Infantry Division.

Many of the incidents in the film were based on actual events, including the rejection of a German demand for surrender on December 22, 1944, with Brig. Gen. Anthony McAuliffe's one word response, "Nuts!". Other events in the film, like Private Kipp's continual loss of his false teeth and Private Roderigues' having never seen snow before, were from Pirosh's experiences.

=== Development and casting ===
Battleground was originally an RKO property, titled "Prelude to Love" to hide its subject matter, but was shelved when production head Dore Schary resigned, despite $100,000 having been put into the property to that point. When Schary went to MGM, he purchased the rights to the script from RKO, over the objections of Louis B. Mayer, who believed the public was tired of war films. At MGM, Robert Taylor and Keenan Wynn were reported to have been penciled in for the film, along with Van Johnson and John Hodiak, and the project was budgeted at $2 million. Wellman put the cast through some military training with Robert Taylor, a former navy officer who dropped out believing the role was not right for him. He was replaced by Van Johnson.

Twenty veterans of the 101st were hired to train the actors and appeared in the film as extras. Lt Col Harry Kinnard, who had been the 101st's deputy divisional commander at Bastogne, was the film's technical advisor. Pirosh also consulted with McAuliffe, who was enthusiastic about Pirosh's intention to show World War II strictly from the grunt's eye view.

The role of Staff Sergeant Kinnie was first offered to Spencer Tracy, but he turned it down. Wellman and Pirosh's second choice was James Whitmore, a Broadway theatre actor and former Marine Corps officer, who also bore resemblance to Tracy. However, the producers insisted a more well-known actor be cast. James Mitchell took on the role, but was fired before shooting, as Wellman thought he lacked the proper physicality and attitude to play a staff sergeant.

=== Filming ===
The film was in production from April 5 to June 3, 1949, with location shooting in northern California, Oregon, and Washington state. Fort Lewis, Washington was used for the tank sequence showing the relief of the 101st Airborne by Patton's Third Army. Shooting took 20 days less than was scheduled, due in part to innovative measures taken by Schary such as processing film as it was shot, then dubbing and cutting it so that scenes could be previewed within two days of being shot. The film came in almost $100,000 under budget.

Upon the conclusion of filming, cinematographer Paul C. Vogel described his work in a professional journal:

Except for the opening scenes (filmed at Sawtelle General Hospital) and the climax (shot at Fort McArthur), Battleground was filmed indoors on Metro-Goldwyn-Mayer’s Stage 15. This is a cavernous affair, measuring 130x320 feet with a ceiling height of 70 feet, nearly three million cubic feet of air....All lighting...was from overhead....However, it frequently left actors' faces black under their regulation G.I. helmets. Supplementary lighting for face modelling was used from the floor up....despite the constant 40 degrees temperature maintained by the stepped-up air conditioning system, we discovered that soon after lighting the set each morning, the lamp heat started the air currents flowing—but not always in the same direction! We turned this meteorological oddity to advantage placing our fog machines—spraying vaporized light mineral oil—at strategic positions, allowing the indoor currents to waft our fog into the desired place....En passant, the constant fog—chemical, not mental—in which we worked for more than seven weeks killed the desire to smoke. Cinematographers overly addicted to nicotine might try this effective, but drastic cure."

== Release ==
Battleground received a number of premieres before its general release. A private showing for President Harry S. Truman was arranged even before the premiere in Washington D.C. on November 9, 1949, which was attended by McAuliffe, who commanded the 101st during the siege. Two days later, the film premiered in New York City, and then on December 1 in Los Angeles.

== Reception ==
Battleground was MGM's largest grossing film in five years. According to studio records it earned $4,722,000 in the US and Canada and $1,547,000 elsewhere resulting in a profit of $2,388,000, making it the studio's most profitable picture of the year. It was rated by Photoplay as the best picture of the year. On the review aggregator website Rotten Tomatoes, 78% of 9 critics' reviews are positive.

MGM released a similar film in 1951, Go for Broke!, also starring Van Johnson and directed by Pirosh.

=== Awards and nominations ===
| Award | Category | Nominee(s) | Result |
|---|---|---|---|
| Academy Awards | Best Motion Picture | Dore Schary | Nominated |
| Academy Awards | Best Director | William A. Wellman | Nominated |
| Academy Awards | Best Supporting Actor | James Whitmore | Nominated |
| Academy Awards | Best Story and Screenplay | Robert Pirosh | Won |
| Academy Awards | Best Cinematography – Black-and-White | Paul C. Vogel | Won |
| Academy Awards | Best Film Editing | John Dunning | Nominated |
| Golden Globe Awards | Best Supporting Actor – Motion Picture | James Whitmore | Won |
| Golden Globe Awards | Best Screenplay – Motion Picture | Robert Pirosh | Won |
| Photoplay Awards | Gold Medal | | Won |
| Writers Guild of America Awards | Best Written American Drama | Robert Pirosh | Nominated |

The film was nominated for the American Film Institute's 2001 list AFI's 100 Years...100 Thrills.
