= American Pastime (film) =

- DVD cover
- Directed by: Desmond Nakano
- Written by: Desmond Nakano; Tony Kayden
- Produced by: Tom Gorai; Arata Matsushima; Barry Rosenbush; David Skinner; Terry Spazek; Kerry Yo Nakagawa
- Starring: Gary Cole; Aaron Yoo; Jon Gries; Masatoshi Nakamura; Judy Ongg
- Cinematography: Matthew Williams
- Edited by: Mark Yoshikawa
- Music by: Joseph Conlan
- Release date: 2007
- Running time: 105 minutes
- Country: United States
- Language: English

American Pastime is a 2007 American Sports drama film set in the Topaz War Relocation Center, a Utah prison camp which held thousands of people during the internment of Japanese Americans during World War II.

While the film is a dramatic narrative, it is based on true events and depicts life inside the internment camps, where baseball was one of the major diversions from the reality of the internees' lives. Producer Kerry Yo Nakagawa has said that a particular inspiration was Kenichi Zenimura and his family's experience at the Gila River War Relocation Center, where Zenimura led the construction of a baseball field and of a league of internee baseball teams that played there. Location scenes were filmed in bleak, desolate land, not far from the site of the actual internment camp.

== Plot ==
The first scene shows the life of the Nomura family, a typical American family of Japanese descent in 1941, composed of Japanese-born parents and American-born children (in this case, two sons, Lane and Lyle).

They are forced to leave their home in Los Angeles following the infamous Executive Order 9066, signed by Franklin Delano Roosevelt. Order 9066 permitted the "exclusion" of Japanese Americans from the West Coast of the United States, and actual historic footage shows the rounding up of these families, most of whom were (like the Nomura sons) born as American citizens.

The Nomuras find themselves in a dusty, windblown desert camp. The viewer sees some actual footage of Topaz War Relocation Center, shot by Dave Tatsuno, using a camera which had been smuggled into the camp.

The elder Nomura had been a professional baseball player, and he rapidly forms an in-camp league. One of the guards, Billy Burrell (Gary Cole) is a minor-league baseball player, bitter about having been passed over by a recruiter from the New York Yankees. Many of the major leagues' top players were off to war, perhaps giving Burrell another opportunity with the Yankees.

Lane Nomura, the oldest son enlists in the Army, as a member of the 442nd Regimental Combat Team, the famed "Purple Heart Battalion". One guard, originally condemning the very idea of letting Japanese Americans into "our Army", changes his mind as he sees a list of men from Topaz who had been killed while rescuing a Texas battalion.

Lyle, the younger son, originally angry and rebellious about the internment, eventually finds motivation to succeed when the Topaz team challenges Burrell and the local minor league team, several of whose members are openly bigoted and hateful toward the internees.

== Reception ==
On review aggregator Rotten Tomatoes the film has a score of 33% based on reviews from 9 critics, with an average 5.4/10 rating.

Jeff Vice of Deseret News wrote "The historical elements -- particularly those that deal with Japanese internment camps during World War II -- definitely make the movie worthwhile".

== See also ==
- List of baseball films
