= Robert Pirosh =

American screenwriter

- Born: April 1, 1910; Baltimore, Maryland, U.S.
- Died: December 25, 1989 (aged 79); Los Angeles, California, U.S.
- Education: Baltimore City College high school in 1928
- Occupations: Screenwriter; film director
- Years active: 1935–1981
- Spouse: Nancy Wilson (1948–1966)

Robert Pirosh (April 1, 1910 – December 25, 1989) was an American screenwriter and film director. He is most known for his war and military-themed works, inspired by his experiences as a U.S. Army infantryman during World War II. He won an Academy Award for Best Original Screenplay for Battleground (1949), a semi-autobiographical account of the Battle of the Bulge. He was nominated for a second Oscar for Go for Broke! (1951), a film about the 442nd Regimental Combat Team.

== Early life ==
Pirosh was born in Baltimore, Maryland, and graduated from the Baltimore City College high school in 1928. His preparation for a career in Hollywood included study at the Sorbonne in France and the University of Berlin in Germany. When he began looking for work in Hollywood, he used a cover letter that began "Dear Sir, I like words" and concluded,

I like the word screenwriter better than copywriter, so I decided to quit my job in a New York advertising agency and try my luck in Hollywood, but before taking the plunge I went to Europe for a year of study, contemplation and horsing around. I have just returned and I still like words. May I have a few with you?

The letter later featured in the book Letters of Note and in 2014 was described by its editor, Shaun Usher, as his "current favorite" and was read by Benedict Cumberbatch at 'Letters Live'.

== Hollywood writer ==
Pirosh began his film career in 1934 as a junior writer for Metro-Goldwyn-Mayer, working with fellow newcomer George Seaton. The two collaborated on the Marx Brothers' 1935 comedy A Night at the Opera and their next film, A Day at the Races, in 1937. He and Delmer Daves adapted Ayn Rand's Night of January 16th for a 1941 film of the same name directed by William Clemens. In 1942 he collaborated on the screwball comedy Rings on Her Fingers for Henry Fonda and Gene Tierney.

== World War II ==
Pirosh was inducted into the U.S. Army from Los Angeles, California, on June 26, 1943. He joined the 320th Infantry Regiment, 35th Infantry Division, as a replacement during the Battle of the Bulge on December 28, 1944. During the battle, he kept a war journal, which later formed the basis for the 1949 film Battleground.

== Post-war career ==
He earned an Academy Award for Best Writing, Story and Screenplay in 1949 for his script for the World War II drama Battleground, a film he also produced, that was the first based on the Ardennes battle. His work was also honored in other venues that year. Pirosh won the Golden Globe and the Writers Guild of America awards.

In 1951, he was nominated for another Academy Award for the screenplay Go for Broke!. This was his directorial debut. He would go on to write the story for the highly regarded Steve McQueen World War II film Hell Is for Heroes, directed by Don Siegel, believed to be the basis for TV's Combat! (which he created). He also directed 1954's Valley of the Kings and 1955's The Girl Rush.

Pirosh wrote the episode "The Man From Leadville" for the 1976 CBS western television series Sara.

== Selected works ==
- The Winning Ticket (1935) – story
- A Night at the Opera (1935) – writer (uncredited)
- A Day at the Races (1937) – writer
- The Wizard of Oz (1939) – writer (uncredited)
- The Quarterback (1940) – writer
- The Night of January 16th (1941) – writer
- Song of the Islands (1942) – writer
- Rings on Her Fingers (1942) – writer
- I Married a Witch (1942) – writer
- Up in Arms (1944) – writer
- Man About Town (1947) (US version) – associate producer
- Battleground (1949) – story, writer, associate producer
- Go for Broke! (1951) – writer, director
- Washington Story (1952) – writer, director
- Valley of the Kings (1954) – writer, director
- The Girl Rush (1955) – writer, director
- Spring Reunion (1957) – writer, director
- Laramie (1959) (TV series) – writer, producer
- The Law and Mr. Jones (1960–61) (TV series) – writer
- Bachelor Father (1961) (TV series) – writer
- Hell Is for Heroes (1962) – story, writer
- A Gathering of Eagles (1963) – writer
- Combat! (1962–67) (TV series) – producer, writer, series development
- The Fugitive (1963) (TV series) – writer
- Alexander the Great (1963) – story, writer
- The Guns of Will Sonnett (1968) (TV series) – writer
- What's So Bad About Feeling Good? (1968) – writer
- The Bold Ones: The New Doctors (1969) (TV series) – writer
- Family Affair (1970) (TV series) – writer
- To Rome with Love (1970) (TV series) – writer
- Ironside (1968–71) (TV series) – writer
- My Three Sons (1971) (TV series) – writer
- Bonanza (1970–72) (TV series) – writer
- Mannix (1970–74) (TV series) – writer
- Twice in a Lifetime (1974) (TV movie) – writer
- Firehouse (1974) (TV series) – writer
- Barnaby Jones (1974) (TV series) – writer
- Ellery Queen (1975) (TV series) – writer
- The Hardy Boys/Nancy Drew Mysteries (1977) (TV series) – writer
- Hawaii Five-O (1977) (TV series) – writer
- The Oregon Trail (1977) (TV series) – writer
- The Young Pioneers (1978) (TV series) – writer
- The Waltons (1979–81) (TV series) – writer
- Harry O (1975) (TV series) – writer
