= Paul C. Vogel =

American cinematographer

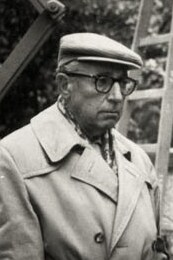
- Vogel in 1962
- Born: August 22, 1899
- Died: November 24, 1975 (aged 76)
- Occupation: Cinematographer

Paul C. Vogel, A.S.C. (August 22, 1899 – November 24, 1975) was an American cinematographer. His credits included The Tell-Tale Heart (1941), Angels in the Outfield (1951), The Tender Trap (1955), High Society (1956), The Time Machine (1960), The Wonderful World of the Brothers Grimm (1962), Hold On!, and Return of the Seven (both 1966).

Vogel began his career in the 1920s and, aside from taking a break from film to serve in World War II, worked steadily until retiring in 1967. One of his more challenging films was Robert Montgomery's Chandler film noir Lady in the Lake (1947), which was completely shot from the point of view of the protagonist. In this movie, Montgomery appears as Marlowe only in the opening sequence and briefly at intervals thereafter, being present the rest of the while as the camera is present, with the result of making the audience seem to occupy the position of detective.

His brother, Joseph R. Vogel, was a vice president of Loew's, Inc. and later president of MGM.

== Awards and nominations ==
In 1949, he won the Academy Award for Best Cinematography for Battleground (1949).

== Filmography ==
- 1927 : Running Wild - Gregory La Cava
- 1932 : Freaks - Tod Browning
- 1937 : Fit for a King - Edward Sedgwick
- 1938 : Everybody's doing it - Christy Cabanne
- 1938 : Wide Open Faces - Kurt Neumann
- 1939 : They All Come Out - Jacques Tourneur
- 1939 : The Ash can fleet - Fred Zinnemann
- 1941 : The Tell-Tale Heart - Jules Dassin
- 1941 : Army Champions - himself
- 1942 : Pacific Rendezvous - George Sidney
- 1942 : Sunday Punch - David Miller
- 1942 : Kid Glove Killer - Fred Zinnemann
- 1942 : Tish - S. Sylvan Simon
- 1947 : Lady in the Lake - Robert Montgomery
- 1947 : High Wall - Curtis Bernhardt
- 1949 : Scene of the Crime - Roy Rowland
- 1949 : Battleground - William A. Wellman
- 1950 : Black Hand - Richard Thorpe
- 1950 : Watch the Birdie - Jack Donohue
- 1950 : The Happy Years - William A. Wellman
- 1950 : A Lady Without Passport - Joseph H. Lewis
- 1951 : Three Guys Named Mike - Charles Walters
- 1951 : Angels in the Outfield - Clarence Brown
- 1951 : The Tall Target - Anthony Mann
- 1951 : Go For Broke! - Robert Pirosh
- 1952 : The Girl in White - John Sturges
- 1952 : You for Me - Don Weis
- 1953 : The Clown - Robert Z. Leonard
- 1953 : The Girl Who Had Everything - Richard Thorpe
- 1953 : Arena - Richard Fleischer
- 1953 : Half a Hero - Don Weis
- 1954 : Rose Marie - Mervyn LeRoy
- 1954 : Green Fire - Andrew Marton
- 1954 : The Student Prince - Richard Thorpe
- 1955 : The Tender Trap - Charles Walters
- 1955 : The Scarlet Coat - John Sturges
- 1955 : It's a Dog's Life - Herman Hoffman
- 1955 : Interrupted Melody - Curtis Bernhardt
- 1955 : Jupiter's Darling - George Sidney
- 1956 : The Rack - Arnold Laven
- 1956 : High Society - Charles Walters
- 1957 : Bernardine - Henry Levin
- 1957 : The Wings of Eagles - John Ford
- 1957 : Public Pigeon No. 1 - Norman Z. McLeod
- 1957 : Tarzan, the Ape Man - Joseph M. Newman
- 1959 : The Gazebo - George Marshall
- 1960 : The Time Machine - George Pal
- 1962 : The Magic Sword - Bert I. Gordon
- 1962 : Period of Adjustment - George Roy Hill
- 1962 : The Wonderful World of the Brothers Grimm - Henry Levin and George Pal
- 1963 : The Gun Hawk - Edward Ludwig
- 1964 : Mail Order Bride - Burt Kennedy
- 1965 : Village of the Giants - Bert I. Gordon
- 1965 : The Money Trap - Burt Kennedy
- 1965 : When the Boys Meet the Girls - Alvin Ganzer
- 1965 : The Rounders - Burt Kennedy
- 1966 : Hold On! - Arthur Lubin
- 1966 : Return of the Seven - Burt Kennedy
