= Charles Walters =

American director and choreographer (1911–1982)

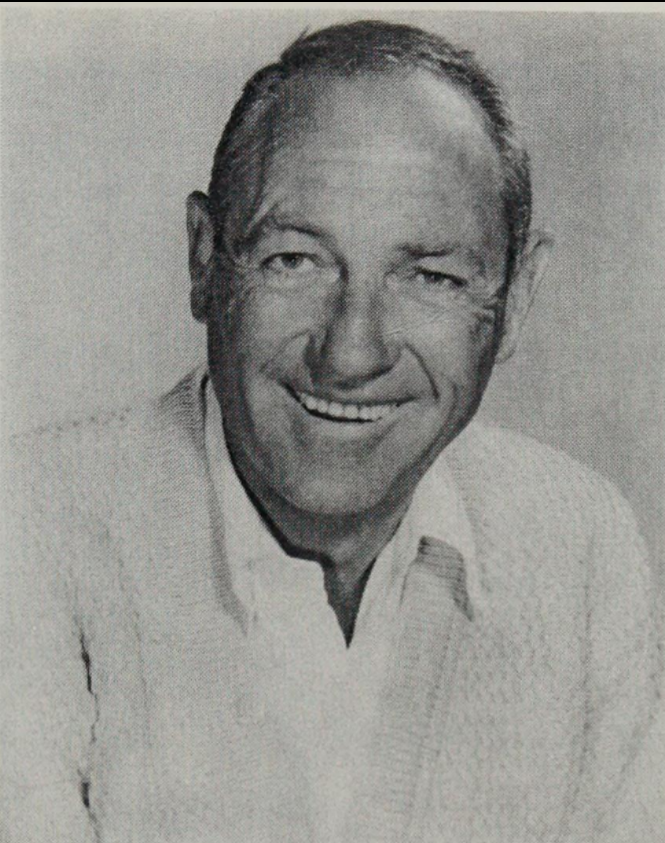
- Walters in a 1964 publicity photograph
- Born: Charles Powell Walter; November 17, 1911; Pasadena, California, U.S.
- Died: August 13, 1982 (aged 70); Malibu, California, U.S.
- Occupations: Film director; choreographer; dancer
- Years active: 1934–1981
- Partner: John Darrow (1936–1980)

Charles Powell Walters (November 17, 1911 – August 13, 1982) was an American dancer, choreographer and film director who became best known for his work on MGM musicals. His notable directorial credits included Easter Parade (1948), Lili (1953), High Society (1956), and The Unsinkable Molly Brown (1964).

Born in Pasadena, California, Walters grew up in Anaheim. As a young man, he left University of Southern California (USC) to join the touring Fanchon and Marco revue as a chorus boy and specialty dancer. Walters next appeared on Broadway as a dancer in the musical revues New Faces of 1934 and Fools Rush In. He was the dance partner of Betty Grable in the stage musical Du Barry Was a Lady (1938–39). He was then hired to choreograph dance numbers for Let's Face It!, starring Danny Kaye, and Banjo Eyes for Eddie Cantor.

Walters's first onscreen credit was for RKO's Seven Days' Leave (1942) where he served as the dance director. He was later hired as a dance director by Arthur Freed at MGM and began a longtime association with the studio by working on several musicals, including Presenting Lily Mars (1943), Meet Me in St. Louis (1944), and Ziegfeld Follies (1945).

In 1947, Walters made his directorial film debut with the musical Good News. He later directed Easter Parade (1948), The Barkleys of Broadway (1949), and Summer Stock (1950). Walters directed the 1953 film Lili, in which he earned an Best Director Academy Award nomination. His last film for MGM was The Unsinkable Molly Brown (1964) starring Debbie Reynolds. Walters's last theatrical film was Walk, Don't Run (1966), which starred Cary Grant in his final film role. He later directed Lucille Ball in two television films. In 1982, Walters died from lung cancer, at the age of 70.

== Early life ==
Charles Walters was born in Pasadena, California, the son of Joe Walter and Winifred Taft Walter, who had moved from Tomah, Wisconsin. His mother worked as a stenographer, while his father worked as a tractor salesman. His father co-founded Walter & Day, a tractor and auto dealership, before he went independent with his own auto dealership company, J. E. Walter & Company. Charles changed his last name to Walters during the 1930s, after he grew tired of the misspellings. By the time Charles was two, his family relocated to Anaheim, where they lived in a modest one-story home on Center Street. Winifred instilled an appreciation for music in Charles, who developed an aspiration to work in theatre.

Walters was educated at St. Catherine's Military Academy, and later Anaheim Union High School. There, he joined the Royal Order of the Grand Drape, the school's honorary dramatics club. During his sophomore year, the Anaheim Bulletin reported that Walters, then 16 years old, had "won considerable renown through his unique terpsichorean talents" performed during minstrel acts for the high school. On December 9, 1927, Walters performed a self-designed clog dance at a widely attended Christmas pageant. The next year, Walters performed as a Romani in The Rim of the World, a three-act fantasy play, and Not Quite a Goose. He landed the title role in the 1928 Christmas pageant The Beau of Bath and The Rear End, a mystery comedy.

== Stage career ==
In 1930, Walters graduated from Anaheim High and enrolled in University of Southern California (USC), Los Angeles. Though his parents insisted he study law, Walters desired to work in theatre. While enrolled in USC, he connected with Leonard Sillman, then a fledging stage producer who was appearing in a local Los Angeles production. Meanwhile, Walters became friends with Aida Broadbent, a ballerina who later worked as a choreographer for Fanchon and Marco, a sister-and-brother dance team.

Bored with his law studies, Walters dropped out of USC and joined a touring Fanchon and Marco revue as a chorus boy and specialty dancer. Thanks to his correspondence with Sillman, Walters was cast in the 1933 revue Low and Behold, which also featured Tyrone Power, Eve Arden, and Kay Thompson. The production premiered on May 16, 1933, at the Pasadena Playhouse, where it was well received. It reopened at the Hollywood Music Box on July 10, 1933, though it later closed in five weeks. Though it failed to reach Broadway, as theater impresario Lee Shubert withdrew from financing the production, Broadway entrepreneur Charles Dillingham hired Sillman as producer and Walters as a performer for the New Faces of 1934 music revue.

"Mr. Walters is certainly to be counted among the best of the light-footed gentry of the revue world. He lifts what might easily be mere hoofing into the precincts of excellent theatrical art by reason of the very simple fact that he is a born dancer."

— John Martin of The New York Times

New Faces of 1934 opened at the Fulton Theatre on March 14, 1933, where Walters performed dance numbers with Imogene Coca which received positive reviews. It ran for 149 performances before it closed later in July. Shortly after, Sillman hired Walters and Coca for another musical production titled Fools Rush In. It premiered on Christmas Day 1934 and closed after 14 performances. Walters and Sillman parted ways after the show was closed, but both remained good friends until Walters's death.

By this time, Walters was frequently paired with Dorothy Kennedy Fox, a dancer from the Martha Graham Dance Company. They performed at a chop suey restaurant in Philadelphia, which led to an engagement at the Versailles night club in New York. Choreographer Robert Alton attended the show, and hired Walters and Fox to perform a specialty number in the musical Parade. It premiered on May 20, 1935, though it closed one month later.

Walters was next hired for the Cole Porter–Moss Hart musical Jubilee (1935) where he introduced "Begin the Beguine" and "Just One of Those Things". In September 1935, it opened as a tryout in Boston. The New York Times praised the show and wrote the "young prince and princess were attractively played by Margaret Adams, who sings charmingly, and Charles Walters, an excellent dancer." Jubilee closed after five months on March 7, 1936, which marked the end of Fox and Walters's partnership. Walters left for Europe on a vacation, where he accepted an offer to appear in Romanian producer Felix Ferry's revue Ferry Tales of 1936 in London.

Walters returned to Broadway to appear in The Show is On (1937), directed by Vincente Minnelli. During the previews in Boston, he was paired with Mitzi Mayfair for the dance number "Little Old Lady." He later made appearance in Between the Devil (1937–38) and I Married an Angel (1938). In the latter production, his performance was Peter was applauded by theatre critics. The Christian Science Monitor hailed: "Really the best of the show is the dancing, particularly that of Walters." Brooks Atkinson wrote, "Although Walter Slezak, despite his family tree, is no particular a singer, he can take charge of a song and he is a comedian with a most engaging manner; and Charles Walters is a superior song-and-dance antic man."

Walters was credited as choreographer on the Broadway political revue Sing Out the News (1938–39), where he reunited with Dorothy Fox (cast as the goddess of peace) to stage her number "Peace and the Diplomat." He returned to acting in Cole Porter's popular musical Du Barry Was a Lady (1939–40), where Walters was paired with Betty Grable. Despite his success, Walters acknowledged his frustration: "I was about twenty-eight and beginning to realize that I wasn't crazy about performing. I almost resented it."

Walters next choreographed Porter's musical Let's Face It! (1941–43). Within days after Let's Face It! had opened, Walters was contacted to help choreograph Banjo Eyes (1941), then a troubled production which received poorly received previews in New Haven, Connecticut. Its November opening on Broadway was delayed, and it eventually opened on December 25, 1941, at the Hollywood Theatre. Thanks to his reputation, Walters was recommended by a casting director at RKO Radio Pictures to choreograph the "dance ensembles" for Seven Days' Leave (1942).

== Film career ==
=== 1943–1946: Dance director at MGM ===
At MGM, Seymour Felix was initially hired as choreographer for Du Barry Was a Lady (1943). He had creative differences with Gene Kelly over the number "Do I Love You", which in Kelly's perspective, required a stylized elegance that Felix was unfamiliar with. Kelly intended to replace him with Robert Alton. However, Alton was in New York and therefore unavailable, and Kelly instead asked for Walters. MGM agreed, and Walters was hired. Impressed with Walters's revised number, MGM producer Arthur Freed asked him to restage all of Felix's work.

After Du Barry was a Lady wrapped its production, in November 1942, Freed placed Walters under contract as a choreographer. Freed then hired him to work on Girl Crazy (1943), where he danced with Judy Garland, in "Embraceable You". He next worked on Best Foot Forward (1943), in which future film director Stanley Donen worked as an assistant. The film's star Gloria DeHaven reflected, "Chuck had an ingratiating personality and a wonderful sense of humor. On Best Foot Forward, he didn't devote much serious time talking to us, because we were such babies, but compared to most choreographers, who were strictly concerned with the sound track and the movement, he was a very loose guy."

For Presenting Lily Mars (1943), Walters appeared onscreen as Garland's dance partner in the finale. In 1944, Walters did uncredited choreography on Gaslight, in which he replaced Jack Cole for a waltz number with Ingrid Bergman. He also went uncredited for Since You Went Away (1944), in which he staged a shadowy waltz number. Back at MGM, he staged the specialty number "I Like to Recognize the Tune," which featured June Allyson. For Broadway Rhythm (1944), Walters choreographed the numbers "Brazilian Boogie" with Lena Horne and "Milkman Keep Those Bottles Quiet" with Nancy Walker.

On Meet Me in St. Louis (1944), Walters staged the film's musical numbers, most notably "The Trolley Song". Walters was next assigned on Ziegfeld Follies (1945), in which he directed the segment "Pied Piper", which featured Jimmy Durante, that was deleted from the final cut. He was later called back to direct Greer Garson for another number titled "A Great Lady Has an Interview", but Garson backed out during rehearsals based on her husband Richard Ney's suggestion. Instead, Vincente Minnelli filmed the number with his then-girlfriend Judy Garland. Walters nevertheless was credited as choreographer.

Afterwards, in October 1944, Walters directed the 10-minute short Spreadin' the Jam (1946). He did choreography for Her Highness and the Bellboy (1945), Week-End at the Waldorf (1945), and made another onscreen appearance in Bud Abbott and Lou Costello in Hollywood (1945). He returned to Broadway to choreograph St. Louis Woman (1946), which was directed by Rouben Mamoulian. Back at MGM, in June 1946, Walters reteamed with Mamoulian on Summer Holiday (1948). Principal photography wrapped four months later, in which it went overbudget. The film was shelved after poor test screenings, and upon its release in April 1948, Summer Holiday was a critical and commercial failure.

=== 1947–1952: Rise to prominence ===
The musical Good News opened on Broadway in 1927 and was an immediate success. MGM acquired the film rights and produced a 1930 film adaptation. Nine years later, Arthur Freed considered a remake with Mickey Rooney and Judy Garland as a follow-up to Babes in Arms (1939). Freed mentioned the project in passing to Walters, who was eagerly enthusiastic as he had participated in a high school production of it. Based on his response, Freed hired Walters to direct Good News (1947). The film was also the first screenplay written by Betty Comden and Adolph Green.

Good News tells the story of a college football star who has to pass his astronomy examination before he can participate in the big game. Freed cast June Allyson and Peter Lawford in the lead roles. Principal photography stretched from March to May 1947, finishing eight days ahead of schedule and came under budget. Good News premiered at the Radio City Music Hall on December 26, 1947 and earned nearly $3 million at the box office. William Brogdon of Variety heralded, "Good News has the entertainment stuff that wears well with age. Its songs still make the foot pat, the comedy comes through with punch and the latest cast delivers in every respect."

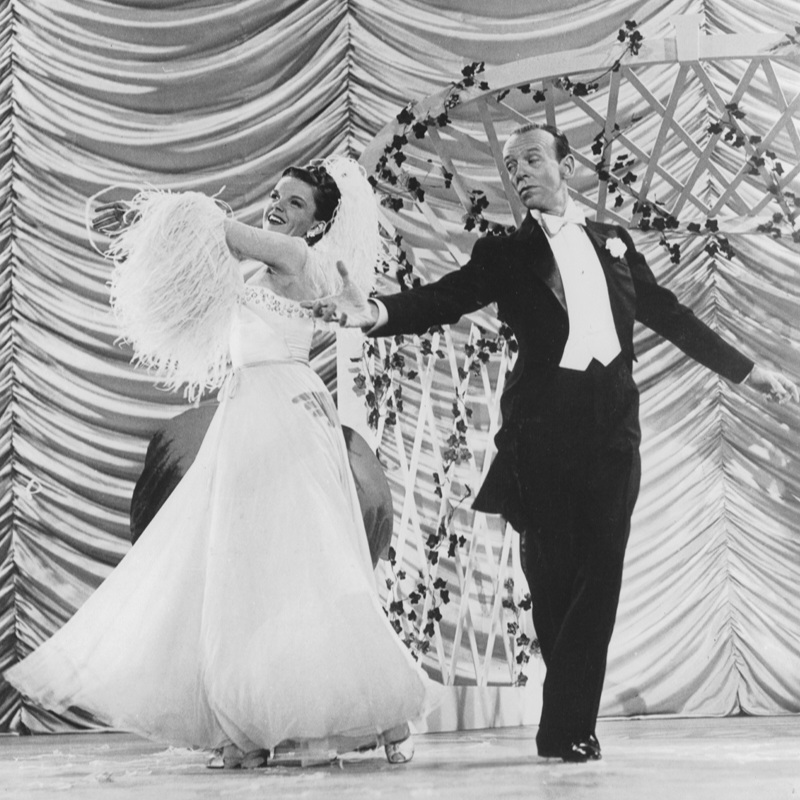
Judy Garland and Fred Astaire in Easter Parade

Meanwhile, in September 1947, Vincente Minnelli was removed as the director for Easter Parade (1948) and replaced with Walters. Minnelli was married to Judy Garland at the time, and their working relationship on The Pirate (1948) had strained their marriage. Garland's psychiatrist advised Freed that she should not work with Minnelli so soon. As the new director, Walters read Frances Goodrich and Albert Hackett's shooting script, but was displeased with the dialogue and the characterization. He consulted Garland and Gene Kelly to rewrite the dialogue. As Goodrich and Hackett were vacationing in Europe, Sidney Sheldon was hired to polish the script.

However, on October 12, Kelly broke his ankle playing sports in his backyard. He was replaced with Fred Astaire, who had announced his retirement after completing Blue Skies (1946). Cyd Charisse, who had been cast as Nadine, had torn a ligament in her knee and was replaced with Ann Miller. Easter Parade began filming on November 25, 1947. During the first few months of filming, Garland was called away on certain days to reshoot scenes for The Pirate. Finished on schedule and well under budget, principal photography ended on February 9, 1948 with the filming of the Easter parade along Fifth Avenue.

Easter Parade premiered in New York City on July 8, 1948, and received critical praise. It was MGM's highest-grossing film of 1948, in which it earned over $6.8 million in gross rentals. At the 21st Academy Awards, Johnny Green and Roger Edens won the Oscar for Best Original Score.

While Easter Parade was in production, in January 1948, Freed began developing a follow-up film, tentatively titled You Made Me Love You. In March 1948, Betty Comden and Adolph Green delivered an original script about Josh and Dinah Barkley, a successful Broadway husband-and-wife team, whose careers split when Dinah decides to become a dramatic actress. Edens suggested the title be changed to The Barkleys of Broadway (1949). Astaire and Garland were intended to reunite, but Garland fell ill during rehearsals. On the afternoon of July 12, 1948, Freed telephoned Garland's physician, who advised that having her continue the film would be a "risky procedure". He also suggested Garland could work for four or five days under medication before needing to stop. Freed placed Garland on suspension, and she was replaced by Ginger Rogers.

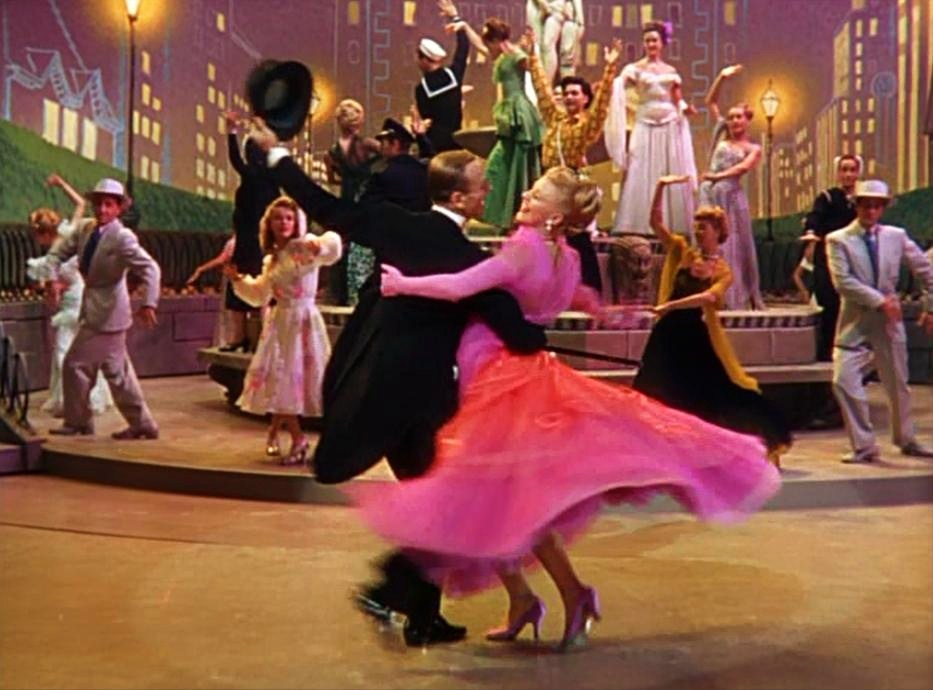
Fred Astaire and Ginger Rogers in The Barkleys of Broadway

Filming on The Barkleys of Broadway began on August 8, 1948 and wrapped on October 30. Released in May 1949, the film received favorable reviews from critics. Bosley Crowther of The New York Times praised the film, writing, "Charles Walters' fluid direction matches the talents of his stars, and the production, in fine Technicolor, is right out of Metro's top drawer. Let's hope that nations will be mellowed by this happy reunion of Ginger and Fred." It earned over $5 million at the box office.

On May 3, 1949, Freed fired Busby Berkeley as the director of Annie Get Your Gun (1950). The next day, Freed hired Walters, who was also dissatisfied with the footage. Walters invited Garland into his office for a serious discussion, in which Garland confessed: "It's too late, Chuck, I haven't got the energy or the nerve any more." The meeting lasted three hours, during which Walters convinced Garland to remain on the film. Filming resumed under Walters's direction, in which he reshot the musical number "Doin' What Comes Natur'lly." On May 10, Garland walked off the set at lunchtime and refused to return that afternoon. In response, Mayer ordered the production closed. Garland was fired from the film and was again placed on suspension. Production on Annie Get Your Gun resumed in September 1949 with Betty Hutton in the lead role and George Sidney as the new director.

Walters was next assigned to direct Summer Stock (1950). Garland and Gene Kelly were announced as the two leads in December 1948. However, in February 1949, it was reported that June Allyson had replaced Garland. Upon her departure from Annie Get Your Gun, Garland spent six weeks at the Brigham Hospital. When she returned to MGM, Garland was reinstated in her original role, replacing Allyson. She played Jane Falbury, a struggling Connecticut farmer. Jane's actress sister Abigail returns with a struggling theater company, led by their director Joe Ross. During rehearsals for their show, Abigail leaves with the leading man, in which Jane assumes her sister's role and falls in love with Joe.

Principal photography began on November 21, 1949 and lasted until Garland completed most of her scenes by February 1950. While overseeing the film's editing, Walters noticed the film was missing a closing musical number with Garland. She suggested the song "Get Happy" while wearing the costume from the deleted "Mr. Monotony" number from Easter Parade. Filmed in two days, Garland appeared strikingly slimmer while adoring a tuxedo jacket, black nylons, and a fedora tipped over her right eye. Released in August 1950, Summer Stock received enthusiastic reviews. The Hollywood Reporter called it "delightful summer entertainment". Variety noted "Walters's direction takes full advantage of the lust production values supplied by Joe Pasternak to put over the entertainment aims."

Walters was initially hired to direct Royal Wedding (1950), but he dropped out due to exhaustion. Stanley Donen was hired thereafter. Walters instead directed his first non-musical comedy Three Guys Named Mike (1951). Jane Wyman played an American Airlines flight attendant, who becomes romantically involved with three men, each with the first name of "Mike" played by Van Johnson, Howard Keel, and Barry Sullivan. Filming began on July 26, 1950 and lasted less than a month. Bosley Crowther of The New York Times criticized the film as "an oppressively bird-brained little romance" which presented a "contrived cloudland confection". Harrison's Reports called the film an "agreeable entertainment, even though the story is thin, for it has witty dialogue and amusing situations". The film earned $1.7 million in distributor rentals from the United States and Canada.

Walters next directed Texas Carnival (1951) which starred Esther Williams and Red Skelton. Scripted by Dorothy Kingsley, Skelton and Williams portray a carnival dunk-tank performer and his assistant, respectively, who are mistaken for a cattle baron and his sister. Filming started in February 1951 and wrapped one month later. Released in October 1951, Texas Carnival earned $2.25 million in distributor rentals from the United States and Canada.

In September 1950, MGM terminated its contract with Garland. Nearly a year later, in August 1951, her manager Sid Luft wanted to have Garland perform a two-a-day vaudeville show at the Palace Theatre in Manhattan. Garland and Luft hired Walters to stage the show, Roger Edens to write the introductions, and Irene Sharaff to design the costumes. At the time, Walters was directing The Belle of New York (1952) with Fred Astaire and Vera-Ellen. In a private meeting with Freed, he requested a sabbatical, which was granted. The production was closed for eight days, from August 17 to 26, 1951.

Garland's engagement at the Palace Theatre premiered on October 16, 1951. The first act featured five vaudeville acts, while the second primarily featured Garland. On opening night, Walters joined her to perform the number "A Couple of Swells", recreated from Easter Parade. The New York Times praised the engagement, writing, "Considerable care has gone into the preparation of Miss Garland for her run at the Palace, and a debt of gratitude is owed to Charles Walters, who staged her act with sound taste."

Walters returned to the Freed Unit to finish The Belle of New York (1952). In the film, Astaire portrays playboy Charlie Hill, who falls in love with Angela Collins (Vera-Ellen), a temperance worker for the Daughters of Right (loosely inspired by the Salvation Army). To enhance the story, Freed decided to set the film during the turn of the century, with the timeframe split throughout the four seasons and stylized after the Currier and Ives paintings. During its release, critics were unimpressed with The Belle of New York. Variety wrote: "A film musical usually can get by with the lightest plot if the dance numbers and tunes are sock, but Belle has an even lighter plot than usual, and the numbers are just ordinary. It's all done pleasantly but not of a quality that rates more than passing interest." The film lost money at the box office.

=== 1953–1964: Established director ===
Screenwriter Helen Deutsch adapted the 1953 film Lili from Paul Gallico's 1950 short story "The Man Who Hated People". Set in France, it tells of an orphaned teenage title character who joins a traveling carnival. Lili is infatuated to Marc, a magician, while she befriends Paul, a carnival puppeteer who expresses himself through four puppets. Vincente Minnelli was approached to direct the film, but he declined due to its similarities with An American in Paris (1951). Deutsch went to Walters's Malibu beach house with the script in hand. "To tell the truth", Walters recalled, "I was more impressed by Helen Deutsch than I was by the script as it was at that point."

According to Leslie Caron, the project was developed for Italian actress Pier Angeli, but Deutsch decided to cast Caron after she attended a private screening of An American in Paris. Walters began shooting Lili on March 10, 1952, in which he not only directed, but for the first time in his own film, provided the choreography. For the visual style, Walters wanted a muted, less saturated look separate from the Technicolor musicals to evoke the post-war British films he had seen. Lili finished filming in April 1952.

An unfinished cut of Lili was screened before Deutsch, the film's producer Edwin H. Knopf, lyricist Howard Dietz, William Rodgers of Loew's Inc., and several MGM studio executives including Dore Schary and Joseph Vogel. Walters was not present at the screening as he was enjoying a ten-day vacation while preparing his next film, Dangerous When Wet (1953). He was told by Keenan Wynn that it was met with a silent response. Meanwhile, Harry Brandt, president of the Independent Theater Owners Association (ITOA), was searching for a film to screen at the Trans-Lux Theatre in New York. Brandt was shown the rough cut and loved it. Relieved, Schary accepted Brandt's terms and finished Lili for a sneak preview.

On March 10, 1953, Lili premiered at the Trans-Lux and received critical acclaim. Bosley Crowther of The New York Times praised Lili as "a lovely and beguiling little film, touched with the magic of romance and the shimmer of masquerade." Harrison's Reports called the film an "enchanting, heart-warming picture". Lili exited the Trans-Lux on December 22, after ten months of exclusive box office. A month after its release in the United States, Lili was given a standing ovation at the Cannes Film Festival (where Walters was awarded the International Prize for the Most Entertaining Picture). Lili later earned $1.5 million in distributor rentals in the United States, and was enormously successful overseas in Europe.

Lili was ranked on several critics' lists for the best films of 1953, including the National Board of Review. The film earned six nominations at the Academy Awards, winning one Oscar for Best Music Score of a Dramatic or Comedy Picture. Walters received his only Academy Award nomination for Best Director and faced formidable competition that year in George Stevens (Shane), Billy Wilder (Stalag 17), William Wyler (Roman Holiday), and winner Fred Zinnemann (From Here To Eternity).

Between the completion and theatrical release of Lili, Walters reunited with Esther Williams on Dangerous When Wet and Easy to Love (1953). For the first film, Williams had been a box office success with Million Dollar Mermaid (1952), and MGM had wanted to capitalize on her aquatic stardom. Scripted by Dorothy Kingsley, Williams portrays Katie Higgins, an American woman who takes a challenge to swim to the English Channel. To star opposite Williams, Walters wanted to cast Fernando Lamas, but he turned it down, feeling the role was too limited. Williams consulted with Lamas, and she appealed to have his part expanded. Lamas eventually took the role as the debonair André Lanet.

Dangerous When Wet began shooting in August 1952 and wrapped two months later in October. The film's most-remembered scene was an animated and live-action musical number where Williams swims with Tom and Jerry. Williams filmed her part first with second unit director Andrew Marton, while the animation and special effects were added afterwards. Released in June 1953, Dangerous When Wet earned positive reviews from film critics. It earned $2.25 million in distributor box office rentals.

For Easy to Love (1953), Williams plays an overworked star attraction at a Florida water show who is romantically entangled with several men, portrayed by Tony Martin, John Bromfield, and Van Johnson in their fifth film together. The film was shot on location in the Cypress Gardens near Winter Haven, Florida. This time, Busby Berkeley directed the film's aquatic numbers. Released on Christmas Day 1953, Variety noted the film's lightweight plot but called the film a "masterpiece of modern moisture". The Los Angeles Times noted the film was "giddy with girls, music and occasional flashes of comedy, and gaudy and glamorous with spectacle. Its story is the old "she would love, and he would not; gosh what?" formula which the movies can always resurrect and which this time is of fair prescription."

The 1953 film Torch Song was adapted from the short story "Why Should I Cry" by I. A. R. Wylie. It was intended to be a segment for the anthology film The Story of Three Loves, but it was instead reworked into a full-length film. At the time, Joan Crawford left Warner Bros. and returned to MGM. There, MGM executive Benny Thau sent her the Torch Song script. Crawford read the script and insisted on Walters as her director after she watched Lili. Walters admittedly thought the script was "a little dumb", but agreed to direct the film.

In the film, Crawford portrays Jenny Stewart, a temperamental Broadway star, who kindles a romance with a blind pianist (Michael Wilding). During rehearsals, Crawford had been nervous about her dancing, having not done so for several years. Following her suggestion, Walters appeared on screen as Crawford's dancing partner in the film's first scene. To keep the costs under a million dollars, the musical numbers were borrowed from playback recordings cut from previous MGM musicals. The film's showstopper "Two-Faced Woman" featured Crawford in blackface makeup, with her singing dubbed by India Adams. Filming was finished after 24 days.

Released in October 1953, Torch Song received positive reviews from critics, though it did not perform well with general audiences. Marjorie Rambeau, who portrayed Crawford's mother in the film, was nominated for an Academy Award for Best Supporting Actress. Retrospectively, the film's reputation has soured, and it was lampooned on an episode of The Carol Burnett Show.

Shortly after, Walters directed the stage musical By the Beautiful Sea, which featured lyrics and music by Dorothy Fields and Arthur Schwartz, respectively. It told of the residents of a Coney Island boardinghouse during the vaudeville era. During rehearsals, Walters held creative disagreements with Schwartz concerning the choreography. The musical previewed in New Haven, Connecticut on February 16, 1954. Afterwards, Walters asked to be relieved before its Broadway run. Marshall Jamison was hired to replace him.

Back at MGM, Walters directed The Glass Slipper (1955), adapted from Eleanor and Herbert Farjeon's 1944 play, which itself is based on the fairy tale "Cinderella". As a follow-up to Lili, Walters reunited with Leslie Caron (who was cast as Ella), screenwriter Helen Deutsch, and producer Edwin Knopf. Michael Wilding was cast opposite as Prince Charles. Elsa Lanchester portrayed the stepmother while Estelle Winwood played the fairy godmother. Roland Petit, the film's choreographer, devised the ballet sequences.

On March 24, 1955, The Glass Slipper premiered at the Radio City Music Hall to accompany their Easter pageant. The film received a lackluster response from critics. Variety wrote: "While Slipper has charm and a somewhat similar ugly duckling-love triumphant story, it has neither the tremendous heart impact of Lili nor sufficient freshness of theme treatment to duplicate the [picture]'s acceptance."

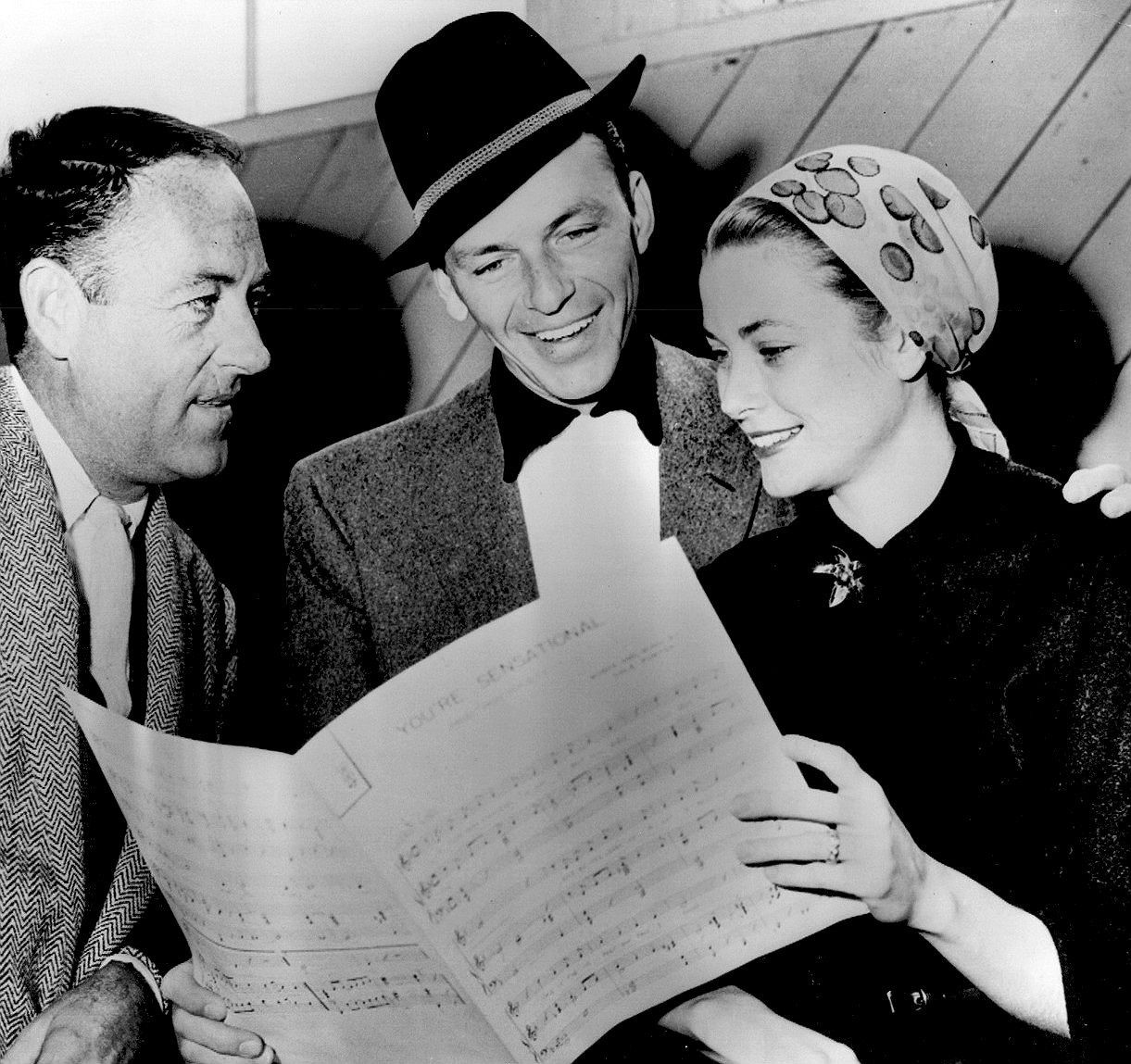
Walters with Frank Sinatra and Grace Kelly on the set of High Society (1956)

Walters was assigned to direct I'll Cry Tomorrow (1955) with his choice of June Allyson as Lillian Roth. Instead, the part went to Susan Hayward. As a result, Walters quit the project, and MGM suspended him for three months. When his suspension was over, Walters directed The Tender Trap (1955), which was based on the 1954 play by Max Shulman and Robert Paul Smith. Frank Sinatra portrayed Charlie Reader, a bachelor Manhattan talent agent, whose childhood friend Joe McCall (David Wayne) falls in love with Charlie's girlfriend Sylvia Crewes (Celeste Holm) while Charlie romances Julie Gillis (Debbie Reynolds), a young actress whom he represents.

Most notably, The Tender Trap was Walters's first film in the CinemaScope widescreen process. To make use of the format, Walters came up with the first scene of Sinatra, framed in an extreme wide shot, singing the title song "(Love Is) The Tender Trap" as he advances towards the camera. Released in November 1955, the film earned $3 million in domestic rentals. Bosley Crowther wrote "Walters's direction is smooth and lively, the settings and costumes are chic and the whole thing looks very delicious in color and Cinema-Scope." The title song was nominated for an Academy Award, but lost to "Love Is a Many-Splendored Thing" from the film of the same name.

Meanwhile, Sol C. Siegel became MGM's first independent producer in 1955. He chose to do a musical remake of the 1940 film The Philadelphia Story, retitled High Society (1956). Grace Kelly portrayed Tracy Lord opposite Sinatra, Bing Crosby, and Celeste Holm in the other leads. Sinatra took three months to agree to do the film on the condition that Walters is hired as director. At the time of filming, Kelly was engaged to Rainier III, Prince of Monaco and wore her real engagement ring while on set. Production wrapped in March 1956, and on April 19, she was married.

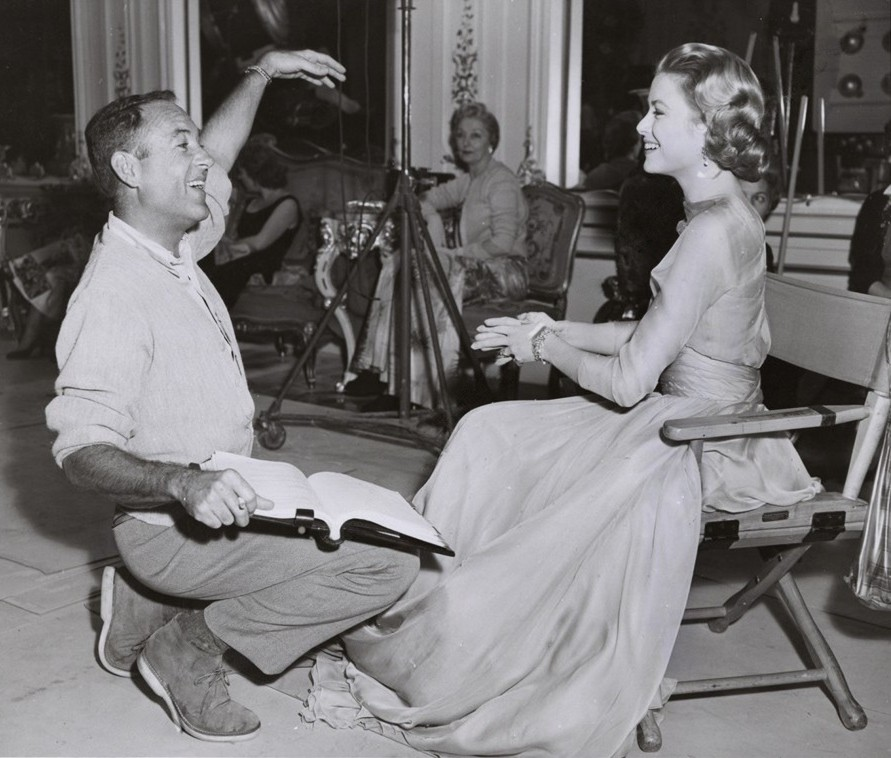
Walters with Grace Kelly on the set of High Society

Buoyed by the publicity of Kelly's marriage to Rainier III, High Society held a widely attended world premiere at the RKO Pantages Theatre in Los Angeles on August 1, 1956. The film was MGM's highest-grossing release that same year. It received mixed reviews from film critics, some of whom unfavorably compared the film to The Philadelphia Story. Time magazine called the film "strictly plebeian." Edwin Schallert of the Los Angeles Times wrote "In spite of all of gaiety, beauty, fine musical and script authorship, High Society is peculiarly hollow in certain aspects, and leaves one with perhaps keener remembrances, if he has any, of the production without music previously made." The duet number "Well, Did Ya Evah?" between Crosby and Sinatra however has been praised.

Walters directed the military comedy Don't Go Near the Water (1957). Adapted from the 1956 novel of the same name by William Brinkley, Glenn Ford leads a group of U.S. Navy public relations officers on a combat-free South Pacific island during World War II. The film premiered in New York on November 14, 1957 and was a box office success. At the Golden Globes, the film received a nomination for Best Motion Picture – Musical or Comedy while Ford was nominated for Best Actor in a Motion Picture – Musical or Comedy.

Walters was often called to film reshoots for other directors' films. In October 1957, he helped choreograph the number "The Night They Invented Champagne" for Vincente Minnelli's Gigi (1958), which starred Leslie Caron. Later on, test previews for Gigi were poorly received, in which MGM president Joseph Vogel ordered for nine days of reshoots. Since Minnelli was filming The Reluctant Debutante (1958) in Europe, Freed selected Walters and cinematographer Ray June to film the reshoots. Walters did uncredited directing for Cimarron (1960) and Go Naked in the World (1961).

Adapted from Winifred Wolfe's 1957 novel, Walters directed Ask Any Girl (1959) with Shirley MacLaine and David Niven. MacLaine plays Meg Wheeler, a naïve small town girl who relocates to New York City and works as a secretary for a market research firm. There, she falls in love with her boss Miles Doughton's playboy younger brother Evan (Gig Young). Walters reteamed with producer Joe Pasternak, and production lasted 43 days from December 1958 to January 1959. In May 1959, Ask Any Girl premiered at the Radio City Music Hall. A box office success, the film received complimentary reviews. Wanda Hale of the New York Daily News noted Walters's "skillful direction to get just the perfect performances from his cast and to keep the humor rolling without stopping for a quiet moment."

In 1958, MGM acquired the screen rights to Jean Kerr's novel Please Don't Eat the Daisies. Doris Day and David Niven were cast in the lead roles Kate and Larry Mackay, respectively. Pasternak hired screenwriter Isobel Lennart to adapt the novel, which itself was inspired by Kerr's marriage to her husband Walter, the drama critic for the New York Herald Tribune. Walters was selected to direct the film adaptation, who admittedly was not a fan of Day. He then read Lennart's screenplay and remarked, "My God, this is Doris Day." Walters wanted to cast Betty Grable as Dorothy Vaughn, a temptress Broadway actress, but Janis Paige was cast instead.

Principal photography for Please Don't Eat the Daisies was shot between August to October 1959. Afterwards, Walters left for Europe with Roger Edens to do location scouting for Billy Rose's Jumbo (1962). On March 31, 1960, the film opened at the Radio City Music Hall. Though it received mixed reviews, Please Don't Eat the Daisies was MGM's second highest-earning film of the calendar year 1960 (behind BUtterfield 8), in which it earned $5.5 million in distributor rentals. The film later inspired a sitcom, which aired on NBC from 1965 to 1967. A month before Please Don't Eat the Daisies premiered, Walters was honored with a star on the Hollywood Walk of Fame for his services to film.

Sol Siegel, then the head of production of MGM, assigned Walters to direct The Spinster, which was based on Sylvia Ashton-Warner's novel of the same name. Ben Maddow wrote the screenplay, which tells of Anna Vorontosov, a Pennsylvania teacher who travels to New Zealand to educate Māori children. By 1960, Julian Blaustein was the producer, while Shirley MacLaine, Laurence Harvey, and Jack Hawkins headlined the cast. The production was intended to shoot on location in New Zealand by October 1960, but Walters called off the shoot after reviewing rushes of the second unit footage.

Filmed instead on the MGM sound stages, production for The Spinster was difficult for Walters and the two leads. Since Harvey was needed for Summer and Smoke (1961) by November 19, Walters was forced to rearrange his shooting schedule, by which he filmed Harvey's scenes first. Furthermore, Harvey and MacLaine did not get along on set. In November 1960, Walters told The New York Times: "This is absolutely murderous. We have got to do all our key scenes in one bunch. Every day and every moment is a climactic scene. I have never done anything like this before. I never want to do anything like this again. There is not enough time for anything, least of all, time for rehearsal, which is particularly important in this sort of rush situation."

Released in May 1961, the film, retitled Two Loves, received negative reviews from film critics and was a box office disappointment. A. H. Weiler of The New York Times called the film "nothing better than a murky drama, despite the lovely colors in which it was filmed. The problems of the amour-harried principals, though seriously stated, seem as distant as New Zealand, in which it all takes place."

In 1961, after he signed a new five-year contract with MGM, Walters announced he would direct Billy Rose's Jumbo (1962) based on the Broadway musical, which featured music and lyrics by Richard Rodgers and Lorenz Hart. A passion project of his, Walters had intended to direct the film in 1947 before he was reassigned Good News. The film starred Doris Day, Jimmy Durante, Stephen Boyd, and Martha Raye. Budgeted at $5.3 million, principal photography stretched from January to May 1962 on the MGM studio backlot. Walters brought Busby Berkeley out of retirement to film the circus numbers.

Released in December 1962, Billy Rose's Jumbo premiered at the Radio City Music Hall to accompany their annual Christmas stage show. Critical reaction was fairly positive, with the Los Angeles Times stating the film is "as corny and wonderful as the circus, and I urge you to put it down right now as a Christmas gift for yourself and the kids." The film however was a box office flop.

While he was looking at circus acts in New York, Walters and Roger Edens attended a showing for the Broadway musical The Unsinkable Molly Brown. Unimpressed, Walters reflected: "Anyway, when we got back to the coast the first thing we heard was 'We've bought Molly Brown and we want you to do it.'" With Lawrence Weingarten as the producer, Walters had wanted Shirley MacLaine in the lead role. Meanwhile, Debbie Reynolds campaigned intensively for the role. However, MacLaine was forced to withdraw as she was under contract to Hal B. Wallis, and Reynolds was given the part. Walters drove to Reynolds' Beverly Hills residence to talk her out of the role. There, he told her she was too "short for the part." Reynolds refused to turn down the part, replying, "It's possible, Chuck, you could be wrong."

In September 1963, exterior filming for The Unsinkable Molly Brown (1964) was done on location in Montrose, Colorado. The rest of the production was moved to the MGM studio backlot. Six weeks into the production, Walters changed his opinion. Reynolds reflected: "He came to me and said: 'I have to admit that I was wrong. You are playing the role really well. I'm pleased.'" As filming proceeded, MGM reduced the production budget of Molly Brown by $1 million in favor of Doctor Zhivago (1965). Therefore, Walters considered removing the six-number dance number "He's My Friend". To retain the number, he decided to film it with the entire cast in one day, using two cameras to reduce shooting time.

The Unsinkable Molly Brown held its world premiere at the Denham Theater in Denver, Colorado on June 11, 1964. After the Los Angeles premiere, the film opened at the Radio City Music Hall on July 16. It ran for ten weeks and became the highest-grossing film at the theater, earning $2 million. Within the United States, it earned $11 million at the box office. The film received six nominations at the Academy Awards, including Reynolds' nomination for Best Actress.

=== 1965–1981: Post-MGM career ===
In June 1964, it was reported that Walters had decided to leave MGM. By December of that year, Sol Siegel invited Walters to direct a comedy tentatively titled Chautauqua with Dick Van Dyke for Columbia Pictures. It was also reported that Roger Edens was in New York discussing a TV film project with Barbra Streisand for Walters to direct. Walters told Hedda Hopper, "What we should do is the story of her life. It's rags-to-riches and Cinderella all over again—and it happened before our eyes." The deal was never reached, though Streisand later appeared in a 1965 TV special My Name Is Barbra. However, a year later, it was reported that Walters would direct Walk, Don't Run (1966), starring Cary Grant, Samantha Eggar, and Jim Hutton.

A remake of The More the Merrier (1943), Grant portrays Sir William Rutland, a married British industrialist, who arrives in Tokyo during the 1964 Summer Olympics. Because of the city's lack of lodging, Rutland rents half of an apartment with Christine Easton, a young woman, and then leases his half to Steve Davis, an Olympic athlete. From there, Rutland acts as a matchmaker for the couple. Principal photography began in Tokyo in September 1965, where the residents of Tokyo were filmed with hidden cameras. Filming was then moved to the Columbia studio backlot for the interior apartment scenes.

Released in June 1966, Walk Don't Run was well-received by critics and audiences. Arthur D. Murphy of Variety wrote the film was "completely entertaining, often hilarious romantic comedy spotlighting as a matchmaker a deliberately mature Cary Grant at the peak of his comedy prowess." It earned $4.5 million in box office rentals from the United States and Canada.

In 1970, Walters moved into television, where he directed two episodes of Here's Lucy. Next, he directed an episode of The Governor & J.J. He directed Lucille Ball in the 1975 TV special Three for Two with Jackie Gleason. Cecil Smith of the Los Angeles Times found the special "rather disappointing" and felt the "pace under the direction of Charles Walters is slow and deliberate, as if both Lucy and Jackie were waiting for jokes that never came." He directed Ball again in What Now, Catherine Curtis? (1976), which also featured Joseph Bologna and Art Carney.

In 1976, Walters was a guest lecturer for Arthur Knight's introductory film course at the University of Southern California (USC). In 1980 and 1981, Walters taught two semesters on film theory, where he screened and discussed his own filmography.

== Personal life and death ==
While he was performing in the musical Jubilee, Walters met John Darrow, a former film actor who later became a talent agent in New York. By December 1937, they were living together in a duplex apartment in Murray Hill, Manhattan. Lucius Beebe, a journalist for the New York Herald Tribune, was the first to report their relationship.

By December 1981, Walters was diagnosed with mesothelioma, caused by decades of smoking and alleged exposure to asbestos while working at MGM and Columbia Pictures. He died from lung cancer on August 13, 1982, at his home in Malibu, California, at the age of 70. Walters's star on the Hollywood Walk of Fame is located at 6402 Hollywood Blvd.

== Filmography ==
=== Director ===
- Ziegfeld Follies (1946) (uncredited)
- Good News (1947)
- Easter Parade (1948)
- The Barkleys of Broadway (1949)
- Annie Get Your Gun (1950) (uncredited)
- Summer Stock (1950)
- Three Guys Named Mike (1951)
- Texas Carnival (1951)
- The Belle of New York (1952)
- Lili (1953)
- Dangerous When Wet (1953)
- Torch Song (1953)
- Easy to Love (1953)
- The Glass Slipper (1955)
- The Tender Trap (1955)
- High Society (1956)
- Don't Go Near the Water (1957)
- Gigi (1958) (uncredited)
- Ask Any Girl (1959)
- Please Don't Eat the Daisies (1960)
- Cimarron (1960) (uncredited)
- Go Naked in the World (1961) (uncredited)
- Two Loves (1961)
- Billy Rose's Jumbo (1962)
- The Unsinkable Molly Brown (1964)
- Walk, Don't Run (1966)

=== Actor ===
- Presenting Lily Mars (1943) – Lily's Dance Partner in Finale (uncredited)
- Girl Crazy (1943) – Student (uncredited)
- Abbott and Costello in Hollywood (1945) – Sailor (uncredited)
- Lili (1953) – Dance double for Jean-Pierre Aumont (uncredited)
- Torch Song (1953) – Ralph Ellis (uncredited)
- Easy to Love (1953) – Nightclub Dancer with Cyd Charisse (uncredited, last appearance)

== Bibliography ==
- Caron, Leslie (2009). Thank Heaven: A Memoir. New York: Penguin. ISBN 978-1-101-15244-7.
- Clarke, Geralde (2000). Get Happy: The Life of Judy Garland. New York: Random House. ISBN 978-0-375-50378-8.
- Cutts, John (August 1970). "On the Bright Side: An Interview with Charles Walters". Films and Filming. Vol. 16, no. 11. pp. 12–18. ISSN 0015-167X.
- Eames, John Douglas (1975). The MGM Story: The Complete History of Fifty Roaring Years. New York: Crown. ISBN 0517523892.
- Harvey, Stephen (1989). Directed by Vincente Minnelli. New York: Museum of Modern Art; Harper & Row. ISBN 978-0-87070-474-1.
- Hirschhorn, Clive (1984). Gene Kelly: A Biography. New York: St. Martin's Press. ISBN 0312318022.
- Fordin, Hugh (1996) [1975]. M-G-M's Greatest Musicals: The Arthur Freed Unit. New York: Da Capo Press. ISBN 978-0-306-80730-5.
- Kaufman, David (2008). Doris Day: The Untold Story of the Girl Next Door. New York: Virgin Books. ISBN 978-1-905-26430-8.
- Phillips, Brent (2014). Charles Walters: The Director Who Made Hollywood Dance. University Press of Kentucky. ISBN 978-0-8131-4723-9.
- Schary, Dore (1979). Heyday: An Autobiography. Boston: Little, Brown and Company. ISBN 0-316-77270-4.
- Silverman, Stephen M. (1996). Dancing On the Ceiling: Stanley Donen and His Movies. Alfred P. Knopf. ISBN 0-679-41412-6.
- Reynolds, Debbie; Columbia, David Patrick (1988). Debbie: My Life. William Morrow and Company. ISBN 978-0-688-06633-8.
- Thomas, Bob (1979). Joan Crawford: A Biography. New York: Bantam Books. ISBN 0-553-12942-2.
- Wakeman, John (1987). "Charles Walters". World Film Directors: Volume 1—1890–1945. H. W. Wilson. pp. 1160–1164. ISBN 978-0-824-20757-1.
- Williams, Esther (1999). The Million Dollar Mermaid: An Autobiography. New York: Simon & Schuster. ISBN 978-0-15-601135-8.
