= The Tender Trap (film) =

1955 film by Charles Walters

- The Tender Trap (1955), dir. Charles Walters
- Directed by: Charles Walters
- Written by: Julius J. Epstein
- Based on: The Tender Trap; 1954 play by Max Shulman; Robert Paul Smith
- Produced by: Lawrence Weingarten
- Starring: Frank Sinatra; Debbie Reynolds; David Wayne; Celeste Holm
- Cinematography: Paul C. Vogel
- Edited by: John D. Dunning
- Music by: Jeff Alexander
- Distributed by: Metro-Goldwyn-Mayer
- Release date: November 4, 1955
- Running time: 111 minutes
- Country: United States
- Language: English
- Budget: $1,274,000
- Box office: $4,495,000

The Tender Trap is a 1955 American comedy film starring Frank Sinatra, Debbie Reynolds, David Wayne, and Celeste Holm. Directed by Charles Walters, the CinemaScope Eastman Color production was based on the 1954 play The Tender Trap by Max Shulman and Robert Paul Smith.

It marked Sinatra's return to MGM some six years after On the Town. A second film under a new contract with the studio, Guys and Dolls, was actually released ahead of The Tender Trap by one day on November 3, 1955.

The film earned an Oscar nomination in the category of Best Original Song for "(Love Is) the Tender Trap" (music by Jimmy Van Heusen and lyrics by Sammy Cahn). The song proved a hit for Sinatra, one he would continue to sing throughout his career. It is performed in a pre-credits sequence by Sinatra, sung in the film by Reynolds in a lackluster version that Sinatra corrects, again by Reynolds in an improved version during a stage rehearsal, and yet again at the end of the film by Sinatra, Reynolds, Holm and Wayne.

== Plot ==
Charlie Y. Reader is a 35-year-old theatrical agent in New York City, living a seemingly idyllic life as a swinging bachelor. Numerous attractive women – among them Poppy, Helen, and Jessica – come and go, cleaning, cooking for, and enjoying his charms.

Charlie's best friend since kindergarten, Joe McCall, comes from Indianapolis to stay with him, claiming that the excitement is gone from his 11-year marriage and he wants a divorce. Joe envies and is amazed by Charlie's parade of girlfriends, while Charlie professes admiration for Joe's married life and family.

At an audition, Charlie meets singer-actress Julie Gillis. She has her life planned to a tight schedule, determined to marry and transition from performing to child-rearing by 22. Although at first she wards off Charlie's advances, she comes to see him as the ideal man for her plans. Julie demands that Charlie stop seeing other women. Charlie balks, but he begins to fall in love with her.

Joe starts keeping company with Sylvia Crewes, a sophisticated classical musician and a typically neglected lover of Charlie's. Sylvia is approaching 33 and desires marriage as much as the younger Julie does, but just does not show it the same way.

One day, annoyed by Julie and possibly jealous of Joe's attentions, Charlie blurts out a proposal of marriage to Sylvia. She is thrilled, only to discover the morning after their riotous engagement party that he has proposed to Julie as well.

Joe confesses his love to Sylvia and asks her to marry him. She turns him down, knowing that he loves his wife and children. Sylvia reminds Joe that girls turn into wives when they marry and she wants the same things Ethel does. On her way out, Sylvia runs into a charming stranger of both wealth and culture who is instantly taken with her.

Joe packs up and returns to his wife. Charlie, his other girlfriends also having moved on with their lives, leaves for Europe for a year.

Charlie returns just in time to see Sylvia marrying the new man in her life. She flips him the bridal bouquet. Julie is also at the wedding. Charlie tosses the flowers to her, then asks her to marry him. She agrees and they kiss.

== Cast ==
- Frank Sinatra as Charlie Y. Reader
- Debbie Reynolds as Julie Gillis
- Celeste Holm as Sylvia Crewes
- David Wayne as Joe McCall
- Lola Albright as Poppy Masters
- Carolyn Jones as Helen
- Jarma Lewis as Jessica Collins
- Howard St. John as Mr. Sayers
- Tom Helmore as Mr. Loughran
- Joey Faye as Sol Z. Steiner
- Willard Sage as Director
- Marc Wilder as Actor-Ballet
- Jack Boyle as Audition Dancer
- James Drury as Eddie

== Reception ==
The film was a substantial hit for MGM. With a budget of $1,274,000 it returned a combined US and international gross of $4,495,000

== See also ==
- List of American films of 1955
