= Alice Thomas =

Alice Thomas may refer to:

== People ==
- Alice Thomas (actress), directed by Raymond B. West

== Fictional characters ==
- Alice Thomas, character in American Perfekt
- Alice Thomas, character in Cut of Ice
- Alice Thomas, character in Don't Go Near the Water (novel)

== See also ==
- Alice Thomas Ellis, writer
- Alys Thomas, swimmer
