= Tina Scala =

Italian-Irish actress (1935–2022)

- Born: Agatina Carmen Maria Scoglio; July 16, 1935; Mili San Marco, Sicily, Italy
- Died: January 10, 2022 (aged 86); Las Vegas, Nevada, U.S.
- Occupations: Model; poet; singer; actress
- Years active: 1955–2021
- Relatives: Gia Scala (sister)

Tina Scala (born Agatina Carmen Maria Scoglio; July 16, 1935 – January 10, 2022) was an Italian-born American actress, model, singer and poet.

== Early life ==
The daughter of an Italian father and an Irish mother, Agatina Scoglio was born in Mili San Marco, a borough of Messina, Sicily.

At 17, she settled in Toronto, Ontario. In 1962, Scala began modeling fur coats in Toronto. When she heard that the Canadian Broadcasting Corporation was holding auditions, she applied, was accepted and began working in daytime television.

== Career ==
Scala studied acting at the Actors Studio, dancing at Luigi School of Dance with Eugene Louis Faccuito and voice with Gian Carlo Menotti. She made appearances on some radio shows and television shows. In 1961, she made her film debut in The Children's Hour.

On December 27, 1966, Scala was dressed in a mini-skirt when a photographer from the New York Daily News by chance snapped her picture as she was stepping over a snow bank when making her way through the snows in Central Park. That photo was published in The Saratogian and seen by many U.S. soldiers stationed in Vietnam. The newspaper received requests as to the identity of the mini-skirted young lady. When Scala discovered that the boys overseas liked her photograph, she posed in a two-piece bikini and became a pin-up.

While Scala was working as a model and actress in New York City, her sister and her mother were living in Los Angeles, California. When her mother – a lifelong smoker – became ill from lung cancer, Scala moved to Los Angeles to be near her family. She often accompanied her sister – actress Gia Scala – onto movie sets, where she had the opportunity to meet many famous movie stars. In an interview, she was asked, "Who was the first star you met?" She answered, "Audie Murphy ... his dressing room was next to Gia's and we could hear him talking to some girls and the girls were laughing loudly. When I met him he was very polite and personable." Scala continued to work in film, appearing as a woman in a laundromat in Midnight Cowboy (1969).

In 1972, Tina's sister Gia was found dead in her Hollywood Hills home. Her death was ruled accidental. Gia Scala was interred next to their mother in the Holy Cross Cemetery, Culver City.

In 1976, Frank Cavestani interviewed Scala for his documentary Making It In Hollywood. She was dressed as Cinderella from the wedding scene, and he asked her, "Which is easier, working in film or theater?" She replied, "Film. Because in theater there are no second takes. You have to get it right the first time."

== Filmography ==
| Year | Title | Role | Notes |
|---|---|---|---|
| 1966 | Seconds | Young Girl Dancing in the Wine Vat | Uncredited |
| 1969 | Midnight Cowboy | Laundromat Lady (New York) | |
| 1971 | How's Your Love Life? | | |
| 1975 | Capone | Mrs. Torrio | (final film role) |

- Southern Fried Shakespeare Gold Medal Winner at WorldFest-Houston International Film Festival (1991) http://worldfest.org/
