= Martha Rose Shulman =

American cookbook writer

Martha Rose Shulman is an American cookbook author, cooking teacher and food columnist for The New York Times.

== Biography ==
Shulman has been writing healthy food cookbooks for over 30 years since the 1970s. She pulls most of her recipes from Mediterranean and Mexican style dishes using lower-fat versions without losing flavor. Shulman encourages the use of fresh, seasonal, and organic ingredients.

Her father was author Max Shulman. She married Robert Alan Israel in 2019.

Shulman resides in Los Angeles, California.

== Works ==
She has written a number of cookbooks; these include:

- The Vegetarian Feast
- Fast Vegetarian Feasts
- The Best Vegetarian Recipes
- Mediterranean Harvest
- Mediterranean Light
- Mexican Light
- Provencal Light
- Entertaining Light
- Spain and the World Table
- Simple Art of Vegetarian Cooking
