= Ride a Crooked Trail =

1958 film by Jesse Hibbs

- Film poster by Reynold Brown
- Directed by: Jesse Hibbs
- Screenplay by: Borden Chase
- Story by: George Bruce
- Produced by: Howard Pine
- Starring: Audie Murphy; Gia Scala
- Cinematography: Harold Lipstein
- Edited by: Edward Curtiss
- Color process: Eastmancolor
- Production company: Universal International Pictures
- Distributed by: Universal Pictures
- Release date: November 23, 1958
- Running time: 88 minutes
- Country: United States
- Language: English

Ride a Crooked Trail is a 1958 American Western film shot in CinemaScope and Eastman Color, with Audie Murphy and future Academy Award-winning actor Walter Matthau heading a strong if not well-known cast.

Gia Scala and Henry Silva co-star in the film, directed by Jesse Hibbs, his final feature film.

== Plot ==
During his escape, bank robber Joe Maybe sees famous US Marshal Jim Noonan, who is searching for him, stumble and fall from a cliff to his death. He enters a town on the dead man's horse, where he is mistaken for Noonan. Maybe decides to hide behind the badge for a while but soon raises the suspicions of the local law enforcer, Judge Kyle. His real identity is nearly blown when the riverboat brings to town Tessa Milott, an acquaintance of Maybe's who calls him by his surname in front of the judge. Thinking quickly, Joe says that she called him "Baby" because she is his wife.

She must now pretend that she is his wife to avoid further scrutiny from Kyle, but this causes problems with her current boyfriend, bandit leader Sam Teeler. The "couple" moves into a house and are well respected in town, although their secrecy is nearly compromised by a young orphan boy who expects "the marshal and his wife" to adopt him. Tessa struggles between her loyalty to her real criminal boyfriend and her growing feelings for Maybe, but each man wants to rob the town's bank.

== Cast ==
- Audie Murphy as Joe Maybe
- Gia Scala as Tessa Milotte
- Walter Matthau as Judge Kyle
- Henry Silva as Sam Teeler
- Joanna Moore as Little Brandy
- Eddie Little as Jimmy
- Mary Field as Mrs. Curtis
- Leo Gordon as Sam Mason
- Mort Mills as Pecos
- Frank Chase as Ben
- Bill Walker as Jackson
- Ned Wever as Attorney Clark
- Richard H. Cutting as Mr. Curtis
- Paul Newlan as Riverboat Captain (uncredited)

== Production ==
The film was known as Middle of the Street and started filming August 1957.

The film was filmed mostly on the Universal backlot with some location shooting at the Janss Conejo Ranch in Thousand Oaks, California. During filming, Gia Scala learned that her mother was dying of cancer and had only three months to live; the day after she heard the news, Scala was involved in a car accident caused by her drinking and driving.

== See also ==
- List of American films of 1958
