= Don't Go Near the Water (novel) =

1956 novel by William Brinkley

- Cover of first edition (hardcover)
- Author: William Brinkley
- Language: English
- Genre: Comedy
- Publisher: Random House
- Publication date: 1956
- Publication place: United States
- Media type: Print (Hardback)
- Pages: 373 pp

Don't Go Near the Water is a 1956 novel by William Brinkley. The book parodies aspects of the wartime United States Navy, particularly Navy public relations, in which Brinkley served, propaganda, war correspondents, civilian contempt for the regular military, and Naval Intelligence.

== Background ==
"In peacetime Lieutenant Commander Clinton T. Nash had been in charge of a Merrill Lynch, Pierce, Fenner and Beane office in the Midwest. Not long after Pearl Harbor he had been commissioned directly from his brokerage office without the corrupting effect of any intervening naval training."

Don't Go Near the Water is a comedic war novel, about United States Navy public relations officers during World War II.

The story is set in 1945, from just after the invasion of Iwo Jima to the end of the war. The officers depicted are in the Public Relations (PR) section of "ComFleets", the fictional advanced headquarters of the Pacific Fleet, on the fictional island of Tulura (a stand-in for Guam).

== Plot and chapters ==
Don't Go Near the Water is an episodic novel broken into ten chapters, each telling a story about the various PR officers stationed on the island, and six sequentially numbered interludes, entitled "Melora", which chronicle the romance between Ensign Max Siegel of the PR section and Melora Alba, daughter of the island's leading citizen.

=== "Don't Give Up the Ship" ===
The PR section is headed by Lieutenant Commander Clinton T. Nash, a pompous stock broker given to jargon and catchphrases. Entirely bald, he is referred to as "Marblehead" by his subordinates. Nash aspires to be nautical ("a sea-going officer"), but cannot master the use of a sextant. (This is a running gag, repeated throughout the book.) Tarzan author Edgar Rice Burroughs is coming for a publicity visit. Lieutenant JG Ross Pendleton, an egotistic radio producer, suggests that Burroughs could visit the natives on adjacent Gug-Gug island. This should produce many opportunities for newsworthy photographs and film featuring the Navy. But the natives wear ordinary clothes, and refuse to dress in loincloths. Nash sends Ensign Siegel to assist Pendleton. Siegel is the ace Sightseeing Officer among the Correspondent's Aides, known for his fulsome if tongue-in-cheek treatment of VIPs. A big, homely man, Siegel is a veteran of combat at sea, and also a graduate of Harvard University. He has made friends with the Tuluran natives, and has even learned their language. In a marathon drinking session, Siegel gets the Gug-Gug islanders to cooperate, but Pendleton has to provide the loincloths. Burroughs' visit is filmed, as planned, but the film is never used by the Navy - much to Siegel's relief, as the natives are recorded discussing (very frankly) the fit of the new loincloths on their nether regions.

Melora 1: The Passionate Sailors of Mendoza

Ensign Siegel escorts two U.S. Representatives on a tour of the island. In the main village, they see old Mr. Seguro chatting with a very beautiful girl in Tuluran. The politicians are very attracted to her. Siegel tries to scare them by warning of the risk of "social diseases" among native women, but they aren't deterred. Siegel then pretends that she is talking about her husband and many children. All three are embarrassed when the girl turns out to be sophisticated and fluent in English.

=== "The Education of Admiral Boatwright" ===
Vice Admiral D.D. Boatwright, a logistics genius and "veritable naval Clausewitz," considers the PR section "oddballs and freaks." Despite his great ability, his boring personality prevents his getting any favorable publicity, and he has been ridiculed by war correspondent Gordon Ripwell of the Chicago Gazette, who boasts of a readership of two and one half million. The Admiral reluctantly acquires a small dog from a native boy to protect him during his morning exercise walks, and when the dog runs away, distributes handbills around the island seeking information on the dog. When it turns out the dog returned to the boy, the admiral happily reunites them permanently. The story is picked up by the press from the handbills. The Admiral becomes a popular figure, with the nickname of "Bow Wow Boatwright," assuring the Navy the benefit of his genius for the rest of the war.

Melora 2: Never Mind the Frangipani

Siegel returns to the village and interrogates Mr. Seguro about the girl (Melora). Mr. Seguro is very evasive about her. After a long struggle, Siegel finally gets him to disclose that Melora is the village schoolteacher. Ensign Siegel immediately heads to the schoolhouse.

=== "Thinking Big" ===
Commander Nash establishes the Home Town News Department and designates "Joe Blow" officers on every ship in the fleet, to generate dispatches about individual Navy sailors that can be sent to their home town newspapers. But the fleet fails to show any interest. Nash revises the system: when a Navy ship does something special, Home Town News will send a dispatch to the home town paper of every sailor on board. He appoints meek and inconspicuous Lieutenant Noah Pratt to run it. Pratt's dedication to the task embarrasses the other PR officers, especially Lieutenant Morey Griffin, the "idlest man on Tulura, which is saying something." Griffin's only ambition is to be the Navy's "boudoir liaison" in Sydney, Australia, where (he has been told) most of the men are away on military service, leaving many lonely women. When he and his roommate Ensign Siegel poke through ships' rosters looking for news of old friends, they encounter the name of Farragut Jones, Boatswain's Mate Second Class on the APA USS Ankletooth. Amused by a sailor named for two naval heroes, they create copy for the sailor and send unauthorized stories to his hometown newspaper in Appleton, Nebraska. Their joke backfires when the editor contacts the Department of the Navy, suggesting that Jones be returned to the States as a hero. Nash is outraged that someone has bypassed the Home Town News Department. The two confess and the exec confines them to quarters "pending the court martial." Nash promptly forgets them; Siegel and Griffin enjoy days of room service exceeding that of The Greenbrier. However, Admiral Boatwright loves the editor's idea, and the two are freed. Jones is ordered to Tulura before the hero's tour of the States.

Melora 3: Hydroz to Jerem

Ensign Siegel has established a formal relationship with Melora, helping out in the village's temporary one-room schoolhouse after class. The school has no library, so Melora gives Siegel questions from her students for him to look up in the base library. He breaks down the formality by purchasing an Encyclopædia Britannica for the school - the one gift that Melora can accept with propriety.

=== "Ultimate Fraternization" ===
Lieutenant (jg) Pendleton, though married, is a womanizer with a penchant for the Navy nurses on Tulura, driving them off to remote beaches at night for seduction. Navy regulations require an escort by a second officer, due to the supposed threat of Japanese hideouts in the island jungles, but to avoid any competition, Pendleton persuades Ensign Siegel's yeoman, Adam Garrett (who wants to be transferred to sea duty), to act as driver and escort for him and his latest conquest, Ensign Alice Thomas. Garrett (who has been celibate for two years) becomes fixated on the pretty (and willing) nurse. He enlists Siegel to arrange for them to have a night alone (which is in violation of Navy Regulations forbidding "fraternization" between officers and enlisted personnel). Siegel has some Tuluran friends pretend to be Japanese hideouts and "ambush" Pendleton, Ensign Thomas, and Garrett, dragging Pendleton into the bush and leaving Thomas and Garrett alone together. She is moved by his passion and his good looks; they become lovers. Siegel pretends to date Ensign Thomas, allowing her to "fraternize" with Garrett. The sailor discovers that, as Siegel had warned him, he had been obsessed with Alice from mere sexual deprivation but unexpectedly falls in love with her. When they indiscreetly meet by day, they are seen by Pendleton, who informs Commander Nash. Enraged by the violation of Navy regulations (and the social impropriety), Nash is nonetheless persuaded by Siegel to avoid disciplinary action against Garrett, warning of adverse stories written by correspondents on Tulura (mainly Gordon Ripwell) sympathetic to the enlisted man. Nonetheless, Garrett is forbidden to see Alice and again requests sea duty.

=== "The Thousand-Dollar Bill" ===
Correspondent Gordon "Rip" Ripwell enjoys throwing his weight around with the fearful Commander Nash and the other PR officers. Ensign Christopher Tyson III, a young tennis-playing Princeton man with a noticeable stammer, is the most junior ensign in PR and given the duty no one else wants: correspondent's aide to Ripwell. When Ripwell demands clean bedsheets not just once a week but every day, and the base laundry refuses to pick up the soiled linen on a daily basis, Nash orders Tyson to take them in and bring back clean sheets. Ripwell even tells Tyson to find him a woman. Ripwell flies along on a bombing raid over Japan, and his publisher rewards him with an inscribed thousand dollar bill. Lieutenant Griffin notes that "PFC B-29 crewmen ... make that same raid ten times a month for a hundred bucks." Meanwhile, Melora and Ensign Siegel lament conditions at the village schoolhouse, a one-room shack pressed into service after the original schoolhouse was destroyed during the U.S. invasion to drive out the Japanese. Siegel has friends in the Seabees (Navy Construction Battalions) who could build a new schoolhouse, but the materials would cost about $1,000. Melora wants to ask Ripwell to donate his souvenir bill, which he doesn't need, but Siegel laughs at the thought of Ripwell giving anything away. Then Siegel recalls that Ripwell describes his publisher as a narrow-minded "Puritan". Siegel, Tyson, and Melora trap Ripwell and blackmail him into donating his bill (and relieving Tyson of his undignified laundry duties). At the ground-breaking ceremony, Ripwell gives a dedication speech, and displays another thousand-dollar bill - presented by his publisher to honor Ripwell's "philanthropy".

=== "The Typical Young Navy Man" ===
Boatswain's Mate Second Class Farragut Jones arrives on Tulura en route to the United States, for a tour from New York to Washington to Hollywood. Commander Nash dubs Jones the Typical Young Navy Man and orders Ensign Siegel to give the sailor Siegel's "complete red-rug, big-wheel, VIP treatment." However, Jones is utterly uncouth. He has elaborate risqué tattoos, uses obscenities continually, despises civilian war workers, and is suspicious of the Navy's intentions. His Navy father was "one of three or four Navy men off the Farragut". Nash, alarmed and desperate, assigns Siegel to room with the sailor and "freshen him up." In ten days, Siegel does a reasonable job by conditioning Jones using whiskey and the allure of sex in Hollywood. Chaperoned by Lieutenant Noah Pratt, Jones has a successful tour of the United States, and stays on in Hollywood as a technical adviser for Navy movies. Siegel gets regular letters from Jones about his success with the ladies of Hollywood.

Melora 4: I Went to Harvard College, Sir

Melora brings Ensign Siegel home for tea with her father, Tulura's chief banker. Mr. Alba is a cultured man, educated in Europe. After the tea, with perfect politeness, Mr. Alba thoroughly dissects Siegel. Despite Siegel's Harvard background, Mr. Alba (clearly but tacitly) finds him wanting in education and breeding.

=== "The Budweiser Mutiny" ===
A lavish officers' club is planned to replace the Quonset hut currently in use, while the enlisted men find their beer allowance strictly rationed to two beers per day. Led secretly by Yeoman Garrett, distributing outraged missives written using Public Relations mimeograph equipment, the enlisted men protest by cancelling their war bond allotments. When Naval Intelligence investigates and the correspondents begin writing stories sympathetic to the enlisted men, Commander Nash fears adverse consequences for Public Relations Headquarters. He responds with a disastrous attempt by the officers to build the club themselves. The effort is a complete disaster by mid-afternoon of the first day when six of the inexperienced officers become casualties to work injuries, including the exec, who falls head first into a wheelbarrow of wet cement. Ensign Siegel defuses the situation by the simple expedient of letting the men have their weekly beer ration whenever they want. Nash learns of Garrett's involvement from Naval Intelligence, but recalling the earlier fraternization episode and still fearing the consequences from the correspondents, rules out a court martial and instead punishes the yeoman by transferring him to the worst duty he can think of: sea duty aboard a destroyer.

Melora 5: Queen's Pawn Opening

The new schoolhouse is going up nicely, and Melora again invites Ensign Siegel for tea. Despite Mr. Alba's courteous pleasantries, Siegel is uncomfortable, until he discovers Mr. Alba's collection of antique chess sets. His educated appreciation impresses Mr. Alba. When Mr. Alba learns that Siegel is also a skilled player (and there are no others on Tulura) he suggests a game - and invites Siegel to stay for dinner.

=== "The Lacy Battle Flag" ===
Debbi Aldrich, the "aloof, tantalizing and beautiful" correspondent for the women's magazine Madame, hits Tulura, where she creates a major upheaval. She especially affects Ensign Tyson by always displaying a half inch of black bra in the open neckline of her uniform shirt. Using her wiles on Admiral Boatwright's assistant, Debbi arranges assignment to a warship going into combat, the heavy cruiser USS Seattle, escorted by Tyson, who has yearned for sea duty. The crew of the Seattle, noting the half-inch of bra, asks Debbi for a pair of her lacy black panties to fly as a pennant during the bombardment of the Japanese-held island of Nanto Shima. Two days after the landing, she slips ashore where the battle still rages, and stays at the front with the Marines for four days. She returns at the end of the week, after Naval Intelligence has begun an investigation into her disappearance, and is sent back to the States. Curiously, after the combat operation Tyson's stammer has disappeared.

Melora 6: New York is a Very Great Excitement

Ensign Siegel's and Melora's relationship has become close, especially as her father has found much common ground with Siegel and grown to like him. Matters are dampened, however, when Melora tells Siegel that as much as she has enjoyed other places, she has a duty to Tulura and could never live anyplace else.

=== "The Day the Bomb Fell" ===
News of the atomic bombing of Hiroshima reaches the island. Lieutenant Woodrow Wilson Shoemaker, a lean, pale "thinking man with a sense of history" and formerly an editorial writer, is in charge of the Historical Section of the Public Relations branch. The reactions of others in Public Relations dismay him when it appears that he is the only person on Tulura concerned about its implications. Commander Nash worries only that the Air Force has achieved a PR coup that the Navy will not be able to match. Lieutenant (jg) Pendleton sees it as a quick opportunity to return to Radio City Music Hall to produce a new soap opera about a "hotpants" Navy nurse suspiciously similar to Ensign Alice Thomas. Gordon Ripwell is miffed that President Truman didn't inform him ahead of time. Shoemaker decides he will not go back to his civilian job, but instead work to prevent future wars. Ensign Siegel bets him a month's liquor rations that in a cross section of views on Tulura, Shoemaker's would be the only apocalyptic concerns. In an all-night drinking and interviewing binge, Siegel wins the bet. Instead of writing out his resignation as an editorial writer, however, a chastened Shoemaker decides to sleep all day, unaware that Siegel has been affected, helping him to make a crucial decision about his own post-war life.

=== "All Good Things Must Come to an End" ===
The officers of ComFleets HQ celebrate the end of the war and the impending return of most to civilian life with a wild party in the new officers' club. Siegel invites Melora and Mr. Alba to attend, and Mr. Alba finds the behavior of the American officers anthropologically fascinating. Lieutenant Griffin has been unexpectedly ordered to Sydney — after the end of the war has restored the normal female-to-male ratio — but lifts his depression by tossing a taunting Lieutenant (jg) Pendleton into the swimming pool. Ensign Tyson wanders the club with his tennis racket swatting higher-ranked officers on the buttocks while yelling, "Mind your rudder!" in imitation of Commander Nash. Yeoman Garrett enters the club "like a Viking come to raid" and carries off Ensign Thomas. Ensign Siegel, in a "spontaneous" gesture orchestrated to resemble a media awards ceremony, informs the exec that he has been awarded the Legion of Merit. Admiral Boatwright, a close friend of Mr. Alba's, announces Melora's engagement to Siegel. (After his night with Shoemaker, Siegel had driven directly to the Albas to ask for her in marriage, after which Mr. Alba invited him to work as an investment broker in the bank on Tulura.) At dawn the next morning, with the party still in full session, Siegel finally succeeds in teaching Nash how to use a sextant.

"'So that's how it's done,' Nash said. Abruptly the exec gave a superior little laugh. 'Really it's very simple, isn't it, Siegel—unlike Public Relations. Why, any meathead could be a seagoing officer.'"

== Reception ==
Don't Go Near the Water was the best-selling work of fiction of 1956 in the United States, finishing ahead of The Last Hurrah, Peyton Place, and Andersonville, the other three novels to reach "Number One" on The New York Times Best Seller list for that year. Don't Go Near the Water achieved that position on August 12 after just three weeks on the list, and remained there 19 weeks until November 25, when Peyton Place replaced it.

Kirkus positively reviewed the book stating that "[t]here's farce more than fun in the episodes, with the humor in the slickness of the situations and the absurdities of the characters, and it has a popular swing in its talk -- and its sex."

== Film adaptation ==
In 1957, the book was adapted into film by Metro-Goldwyn-Mayer as Don't Go Near the Water, starring Glenn Ford, Gia Scala, Earl Holliman, Anne Francis, Keenan Wynn, Russ Tamblyn and Eva Gabor. Don't Go Near the Water was directed by Charles Walters.
