= The Garment Jungle =

1957 film by Vincent Sherman

- Theatrical release poster
- Directed by: Vincent Sherman
- Screenplay by: Harry Kleiner
- Based on: Articles "Gangsters in the Dress Business" by Lester Velie
- Produced by: Harry Kleiner
- Starring: Lee J. Cobb; Kerwin Mathews; Gia Scala; Richard Boone; Valerie French
- Cinematography: Joseph F. Biroc
- Edited by: William Lyon
- Music by: Leith Stevens
- Color process: Black and white
- Production company: Columbia Pictures
- Distributed by: Columbia Pictures
- Release date: April 25, 1957 (United States)
- Running time: 88 minutes
- Country: United States
- Language: English
- Budget: $1,050,000
- Box office: 260,086 admissions (France)

The Garment Jungle is a 1957 American film noir crime film directed by Vincent Sherman and starring Lee J. Cobb, Kerwin Mathews, Gia Scala, Richard Boone and Valerie French.

== Plot ==
Alan Mitchell is a returning Korean War veteran who joins his father Walter's garment company, Roxton Fashions. The company has been paying protection money to gangsters led by Artie Ravidge to keep the union out.

Walter's partner, Fred Kenner, sympathizes with the union's goals. After he tells Walter to sever his ties with the hoodlum enforcers, Kenner is killed when the freight elevator he enters, which was just 'fixed' by one of the hoods disguised as a repairman, plunges 12 stories to the bottom of the shaft.

Tulio Renata is an organizer trying to bring the union into the factory; he also later gets murdered by Ravidge's men, and his wife Theresa Renata endures threats against herself and their child.

Alan Mitchell comes to sympathize with the plight of the workers. When he finally convinces his father to fire the union-busting gangsters, Walter is killed and Ravidge attempts to take over the factory. Theresa Renata takes copies of Mitchell's records to the police, who arrest Ravidge.

== Cast ==
- Lee J. Cobb as Walter Mitchell
- Kerwin Mathews as Alan Mitchell
- Gia Scala as Theresa Renata
- Richard Boone as Artie Ravidge
- Valerie French as Lee Hackett
- Robert Loggia as Tulio Renata
- Joseph Wiseman as George Kovan
- Harold J. Stone as Tony
- Adam Williams as Ox
- Wesley Addy as Mr. Paul
- Willis Bouchey as Dave Bronson
- Robert Ellenstein as Fred Kenner
- Celia Lovsky as Tulio's mother

== Production ==
=== Development ===
In November 1955 Columbia announced they had purchased the rights to a Reader's Digest article, "Gangsters in the Dress Business" by Lester Velie, about the efforts of organized crime to infiltrate the garment industry. Harry Kleiner was assigned to write and produce. It was to be called Garment Center. Executive producer Jerry Wald said the film would pay tribute to the efforts of unions to fight crime, and be shot in part on location in the garment district in New York.

=== Robert Aldrich ===
In July 1956 Robert Aldrich signed a two-picture deal with Columbia to make films through his own company, The Associates and Aldrich, and Garment Center was to be the first. Aldrich says he mostly agreed to do the film so Columbia would finance the second movie he wanted to make, Until Proven Guilty.

Aldrich said Kleiner's script was "terribly tough, controversial". He said it was about how mostly Jewish manufacturers hired the mostly Italian mafia to help them with labor. Aldrich said "it was a marvellous conflict - racial, social, religious."

Eventually the film was made for Columbia directly, but Aldrich planned to follow it with Until Proven Guilty for his company and to be distributed through Columbia. He arrived in New York with Kleiner in July to start scouting locations.

The lead roles were given to Lee J. Cobb, who had been in On the Waterfront (1954), a similar organized-crime-in-labor story for Columbia, and Kerwin Mathews, who was under contract to the studio and had just starred in The 7th Voyage of Sinbad. Aldrich says he had to use Matthews along with other Columbia contract players such as Gia Scala, Robert Loggia, and Valerie French. "The presence of four newcomers can seriously overburden the director," said Aldrich. "But such were the terms of the agreement with Columbia."

Aldrich called the movie "the first pro-labor picture; in it I am trying to emphasize another particular aspect of our times - the tragedy of the small businessman, caught between the ever expanding large corporations and the pressures of organized labor. The small businessman has often, in order to stay alive, compromise with graft and blackmail....[the film] should be an unusually frank film."

Filming began on October 12, 1956, with location shooting in New York. Columbia rented and fitted out its own garment centre for filming.

=== Firing of Robert Aldrich ===
On December 3, it was reported that Aldrich had "come to an impasse after several weeks of filming" and would be replaced as director by Vincent Sherman, who had made a number of films for Columbia.

Aldrich says "it was shaping up as a pretty good picture" when Columbia "suddenly realized they had no intention of making that sort of document; they wanted to make 'boy meets girl in a dress factory'. I was pretty stubborn, and Harry Cohn, head of Columbia, was pretty stubborn, and they wanted to change the focus, the force, the direction of the picture. I wouldn't do it and Cohn fired me." He said Cohn "became frightened how tough it was."

Aldrich says he had become interested in the Lee J. Cobb character, the man "squeezed out by both big business and excessive labor demands and gangsterism... also fettered by being Jewish, of which he was proud but also subconsciously angry since it interfered with his complete freedom due to the survival of some brands of anti-Semitism."

Aldrich added that Lee J Cobb "was one of the sore points on that film. He had an old, long-standing relationship with Harry Cohn; Cobb and I did not get along. He's a very strong-willed actor - a wonderful actor but... That could have been a wonderful picture. It just ran out of guts in the middle."

Aldrich said Cobb "didn't want to be a rough father. He didn't want to have people dislike him. And it was necessary for him to be a tough, miserable son of a bitch, not a good guy. So everyday someone or other would want me to soften the script."

According to Sherman, "Aldrich and the producer were not getting along" and "neither one of them were getting along with Harry Cohn". Cohn asked Sherman to do "one or two scenes and I couldn't turn him down." Sherman says Cohn then asked him to finish the picture. "I didn't know what the hell was going on," said Sherman. "I re-shot, I would say, about seventy percent of the picture in about ten days time."

"That was a strange experience," said Aldrich. "I don't remember another occasion of a guy getting fired for wanting to shoot the picture he'd been assigned. Usually, if you're fired, it's for wanting to change the script."

Aldrich says he never saw the final film but was told "about half or two thirds of it is mine". He may have seen it later because he said Sherman made it "very quiet and very mild; it became a love story, also about a father who wanted give his business to his son, all that bullshit."

Aldrich went on to sue Columbia for not financing Storm in the Sun, a film he wanted to make. The case settled out of court.

Despite the firing Aldrich admired Cohn. "I think he ran a marvellous studio... I think he did it as well as anybody could do it... He wasn't in the money business; he was in the movie business." Aldrich says he had a chance to do other work for Cohn before the latter died but didn't do so and "always regretted it."

== See also ==
- List of American films of 1957

== Notes ==
- Aldrich, Robert (2004). Robert Aldrich: Interviews. University Press of Mississippi.
