= Don't Go Near the Water (film) =

1957 film by Charles Walters

- Theatrical release poster
- Directed by: Charles Walters
- Screenplay by: Dorothy Kingsley; George Wells
- Based on: Don't Go Near the Water; 1956 novel by William Brinkley
- Produced by: Lawrence Weingarten
- Starring: Glenn Ford; Anna Kashfi; Gia Scala; Earl Holliman; Anne Francis; Keenan Wynn; Fred Clark
- Cinematography: Robert J. Bronner
- Edited by: Adrienne Fazan
- Music by: Bronislau Kaper
- Production company: Avon Productions
- Distributed by: Metro-Goldwyn-Mayer
- Release date: November 14, 1957
- Running time: 107 minutes
- Country: United States
- Language: English
- Budget: $2,495,000
- Box office: $6,140,000

Don't Go Near the Water is a 1957 American comedy film about a U.S. Navy public relations unit stationed on an island in the Pacific Ocean during World War II. It is an adaptation of the 1956 novel of the same name by William Brinkley. Glenn Ford and Gia Scala star. This is the first of several service comedies that Ford appeared in after the huge success of The Teahouse of the August Moon. The movie was very successful and further solidified Ford's reputation as an adept comedic actor.

== Plot ==
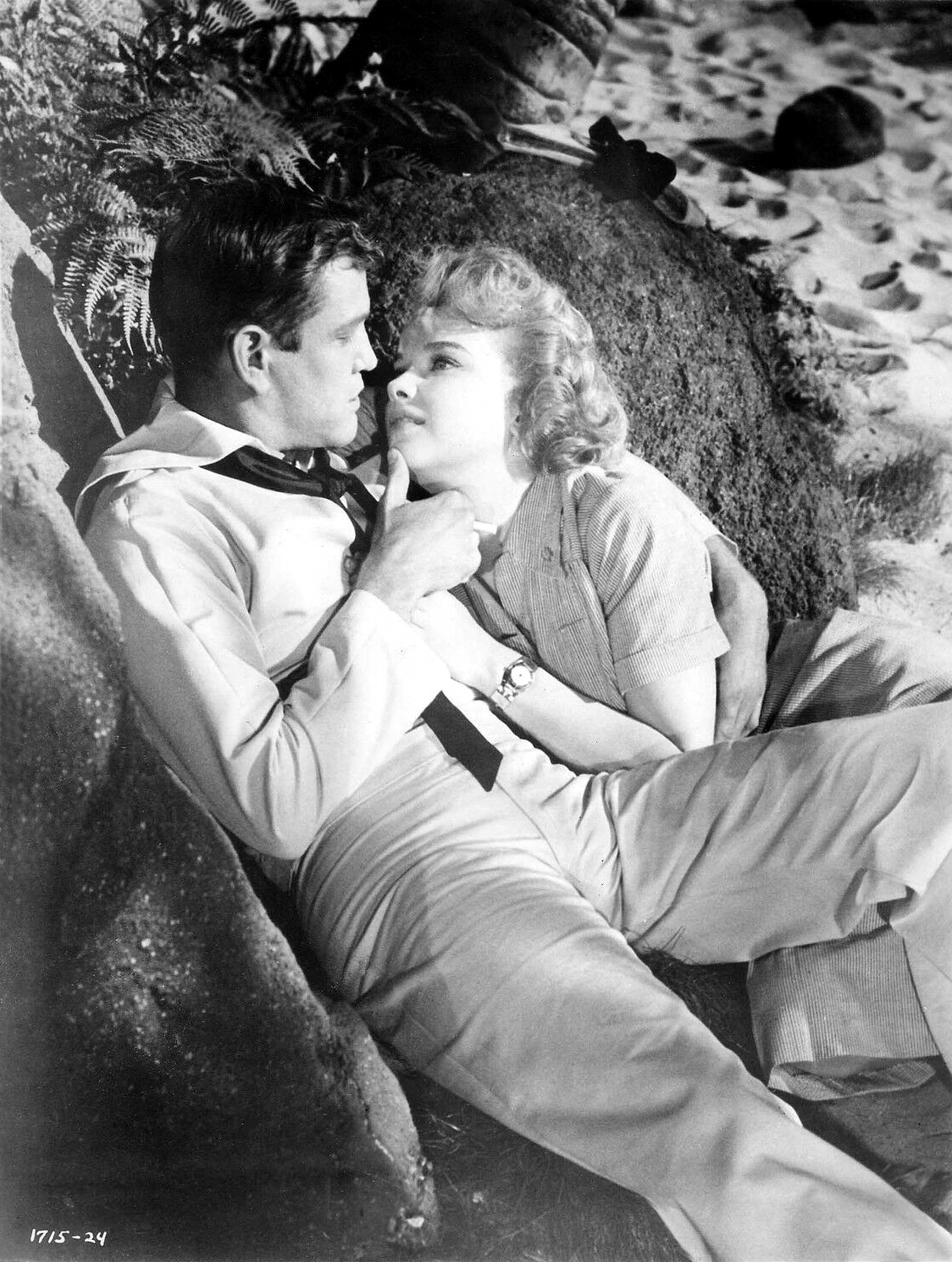
Holliman and Francis in a publicity still

Lieutenant (j.g.) Max Siegel and other US Navy personnel are stuck in a public relations unit far from the fighting. Lieutenant Commander Clinton T. Nash, their commanding officer and a stockbroker in civilian life, refuses to allow anyone to transfer out. Much of Siegel's time is spent showing war correspondents (like obnoxious Gordon Ripwell) and visiting Congressmen around the island.

One day, Siegel spots beautiful local schoolteacher Melora Alba. Despite some formidable obstacles, he eventually wins her love. However, they break up when he wants to live in New York City to further his career, while she feels she is needed on the island.

Meanwhile, Siegel's yeoman, Adam Garrett, falls in love with Navy nurse Alice Tomlen, which constitutes a serious breach of Navy regulations, as Tomlen is an officer while Garrett is only an enlisted man. However, Siegel pretends to be dating her himself in order to give Garrett the opportunity to spend time with her. This couple also fall in love. When Nash finds out, Siegel suggests a fitting punishment would be a transfer to a fighting unit (something Garrett very much wants).

With the Army hogging the news headlines, Nash comes up with the idea to take an ordinary sailor and send him on a morale-boosting tour, all highly publicized. He chooses Farragut Jones. Unfortunately, Jones turns out to be foul-mouthed and heavily tattooed, not exactly what Nash had hoped for. He assigns Siegel to smooth out Jones's rough edges, with limited success.

Later, Siegel has to escort another war correspondent, the shapely and blonde Deborah Aldrich, when she finagles her way aboard a heavy cruiser on its way to a combat operation, much to Admiral Junius Boatwright's disapproval.

With the end of the war, Siegel realizes that he cannot live without Melora, and decides to remain on the island.

== Cast ==
- Glenn Ford as Lieutenant (j.g.) Max Siegel
- Gia Scala as Melora Alba
- Earl Holliman as Adam Garrett
- Anne Francis as Lieutenant (j.g.) Alice Tomlen
- Keenan Wynn as Gordon Ripwell
- Fred Clark as Lieutenant Commander Clinton T. Nash
- Eva Gabor as Deborah Aldrich
- Russ Tamblyn as Ensign Tyson
- Jeff Richards as Lieutenant Ross Pendleton
- Mickey Shaughnessy as Farragut Jones
- Howard Smith as Admiral Junius Boatwright
- Romney Brent as Mr. Alba, Melora's father
- Mary Wickes as Janie, a nurse who enjoys the attention resulting from being one of the few American women on the island
- Jack Straw as Lieutenant Commander Gladstone
- Robert Nichols as Lieutenant Commander Hereford
- John Alderson as Lieutenant Commander Diplock
- Jack Albertson as Rep. George Jansen
- Charles Watts as Rep. Arthur Smithfield

== Reception ==
According to MGM records, the film earned $4,265,000 in the US and Canada, and $1,875,000 elsewhere, resulting in a profit of $1,004,000. It was nominated for Best Motion Picture - Musical or Comedy at the 1958 Golden Globes.

== See also ==
- List of American films of 1957
