= The Tender Trap (play) =

1954 play by Max Shulman and Robert Paul Smith

- Original language: English
- Written by: Max Shulman and Robert Paul Smith
- Subject: Bachelor tries to dodge matrimony
- Genre: Farce
- Setting: Manhattan apartment of Charlie Reader, mid-1950s

Premiere
- Date: October 13, 1954
- Place: Longacre Theatre
- Directed by: Michael Gordon

The Tender Trap is a 1954 play by Max Shulman and Robert Paul Smith. It is a three-act farce, with a small cast, one setting, and moderate pacing. The story concerns a bachelor with a trio of professional women and a recent college grad as girl friends, who tries to avoid their suggestions of marriage.

The play's original Broadway performance was produced by Clinton Wilder, staged by Michael Gordon, and starred Robert Preston, Kim Hunter, and Ronny Graham. The play was profitable but a venue scheduling conflict forced it to close early while still making money. Popular with community theatre and regional theatre during the 1950s, it has never had a Broadway revival, but was adapted by its authors for a 1955 MGM film release.

== Characters ==
Listed in order of appearance within their scope.

Leads

- Charlie Reader is a 35-year-old bachelor, a pharmaceutical executive, trying to avoid marriage.
- Joe McCall is a married man living in Indianapolis, a chemist who comes to Charlie with an invention.
- Sylvia Crewes is a classical violinist who cooks breakfast for Charlie and cleans his apartment.

Supporting

- Poppy Matson is an attractive woman in her early thirties, well-groomed, an editor at Doubleday.
- Jessica Collins is an attractive thirty-ish woman, who is a buyer for a major women's clothing line.
- Julie Gillis is a recent college graduate, stubborn without being proud.

Featured

- Earl Lindquist is another chemist who is asked to test the efficacy of Joe's cold pills.
- Sol Schwartz is a jazz trombonist who appears in the third act after a big party.

Off stage

- Ethel McCall back in Indianapolis, is Joe's wife and the mother of his children.

== Synopsis ==
Charlie Reader lives in a terrace apartment on Manhattan's Upper East Side, overlooking the Queensboro Bridge. He is a bachelor, a transplant from the Midwest, who has no need to go out and find female companionship... they come to him. At 6pm on a Saturday evening he is necking with one Poppy Matson on his living room couch, when old buddy Joe McCall shows up unexpectedly. McCall is a chemist who has invented a pill to cure the common cold. He's come to visit Charlie to get ideas about testing and marketing it. Charlie welcomes him and introduces Poppy, and later his other girl friends. Joe is astonished at how the girls show up to clean Charlie's apartment, cook him meals, and bring him gifts like fish and cheese. Poppy, Jessica, and Sylvia have good careers but are feeling the urge to get married now that they are in their early thirties. The fourth and youngest girl friend, Julie Gillis, is equally in pursuit of Charlie but won't fall in line with his suggestions.

The constant parade of femininity affects Joe, who up till now had entertained no stray thoughts about his marriage. He begins gravitating towards Sylvia, while Charlie finds himself more and more intrigued with Julie. Earl Lindquist finds Joe's pills are worthless, so there's no longer a reason for him to stay, but Charlie, under the press of unexpected competition blurts out a proposal to Sylvia. Aghast, he realizes the only thing to do is proposed to Julie as well. Joe, trying to stave off his return to wife and family, makes a half-hearted play for Sylvia. She forcefully reminds him about his wife, and decides Charlie isn't for her either, and so walks out on both men. Julie, however, has no intention of letting pride get between her and Charlie, and so the play ends with their engagement.

== Original production ==
=== Background ===
The first public word of The Tender Trap came during February 1954, when Irene Mayer Selznick reportedly took an option on it. Nothing more was published until the end of April, when Clinton Wilder announced he would produce it for an early Fall premiere, with rehearsals to start in August. Within two weeks, Wilder announced that Michael Gordon would stage the play. By June 1954, Paul Morrison had been signed to do the set design, and it was reported rehearsals would start August 30, with tryouts in New Haven (Note: Nothing further is heard about a tryout in New Haven; the first performance of the play was done in Boston.) and Boston before a mid-October premiere on Broadway.

Clinton Wilder, a cousin of the playwright Thorton Wilder, had said nothing about financial backing for the production. Columnist Joe Hyams reported that MGM had bought The Tender Trap and planned to mount a Broadway production before making a film of it. By early August Kim Hunter, Jack Manning, Janet Riley, Julia Meade, and Parker McCormick had been signed for the cast. Not until mid-August was it confirmed that Robert Preston had been signed for one of the male leads, while comedian Ronny Graham was cast for the other male lead just four days before rehearsals started.

=== Cast ===
Cast for the tryout in Boston and during the original Broadway run
Role	Actor	Dates	Notes and sources
Charlie Reader	Ronny Graham	Sep 25, 1954 - Jan 8, 1955	Graham was cast because he was "tall, lean, occasionally awkward and not at all handsome".
Joe McCall	Robert Preston	Sep 25, 1954 - Jan 8, 1955	
Sylvia Crewes	Kim Hunter	Sep 25, 1954 - Jan 8, 1955	
Poppy Matson	Parker McCormick	Sep 25, 1954 - Oct 30, 1954	McCormick left for a larger role in One Eye Closed by Justin Sturm, which flopped.
Poppy Matson	Marrian Walters	Nov 01, 1954 - Jan 8, 1955	Walters (1923–1990) had an award-winning career on stage and as a costumer.
Jessica Collins	Julia Meade	Sep 25, 1954 - Jan 8, 1955	
Julie Gillis	Janet Riley	Sep 25, 1954 - Jan 8, 1955	From Simcoe, Ontario, she was married to Werner Klemperer at the time of this production.
Earl Lindquist	Jack Manning	Sep 25, 1954 - Jan 8, 1955	
Sol Schwartz	Joey Faye	Sep 25, 1954 - Jan 8, 1955	Faye was the only original Broadway cast member to appear in the MGM motion picture.

=== Tryout ===
The play had a two-week tryout at the Wilbur Theatre in Boston starting September 25, 1954. Critic Cyrus Durgin of The Boston Globe reviewed it twice; while expressing an overall positive assessment on both occasions, he also highlighted problems with the third act. He felt the strength of the work lay in Shulman and Smith's dialogue and humor, which was superior to most farces; in the control director Michael Gordon kept over the action and in reconciling two such different acting styles as those of Robert Preston and Ronny Graham; and in the general excellence of the cast. He also appreciated the whimsical touch Paul Morrison gave to the set, placing a horseshoe over the door leading to Charlie's bedroom.

Durgin suggested the character of Sol Schwartz should be dropped, as it added nothing to the storyline. He also thought the entire sub-plot involving Joe McCall was weak, a reflection of playwriting inexperience by Shulman and Smith. He further pointed out the ambivalent appeal of the main character, Charlie Reader who "has two sides: he's a louse if you take him seriously, and a character if you find his amusing aspects." Ronny Graham, who played Charlie, also commented on this dichotomy in a later interview: "In Boston it wasn't set yet, it wasn't cleared and squared away and I could feel them hating this boy".

=== Premiere and reception ===
The play premiered on October 13, 1954, at the Longacre Theatre on Broadway. The Longacre was not yet air-conditioned, and the temperature in Manhattan that day was a record high 85 °F (29.4 °C). Two critics mentioned the heat in their reviews, suggesting that it affected timing and audience response. John Chapman of the Daily News maintained The Tender Trap was "a skillfully contrived and very enjoyable farce", but suggested the director and authors should cut "twelve minutes out of the comedy, six of them in the last act". Brooks Atkinson praised the performances of Robert Preston and Kim Hunter, but faulted the writers for what he termed "a ready made comedy". The Tender Trap he wrote "has a promising appearance. But the quality of the merchandise is inferior".

Walter Kerr was dubious about the comedy's approach to relationships. He pointed out that Kim Hunter's pleasing and professional character wound up turning away from both the male leads and going it alone. Louis Sheaffer was dismissive about The Tender Trap, calling it "flat" and suggesting it "tries hard to be funny".

=== Closing ===
After 102 performances, The Tender Trap closed on Broadway on January 8, 1955. It was still doing well at the box office, but had to make way at the Longacre Theatre for a new play, Festival. The play was sold to three new producers (Jay Lurye, Arthur Waxman, and Bernard Simon) who took it on the road starting with Philadelphia's Walnut Theatre on January 25, 1955. Only two original cast, Janet Riley and Joey Faye, and replacement Marrian Walters, went with the touring company.

== Film adaption ==
Before the play had even started rehearsals, Max Shulman and Paul Smith had sold the movie rights to MGM. The characters' background was switched from pharmaceuticals and other occupations to show business. Perhaps mindful of Walter Kerr's observation, Shulman and Smith added a rebound romance and wedding scene at the end for Sylvia Crewes (Celeste Holm), which also provided the denounment for the romance between Charlie Reader (Frank Sinatra) and Julie Gillis (Debbie Reynolds).
