= Gia Scala =

British-American actress (1934–1972)

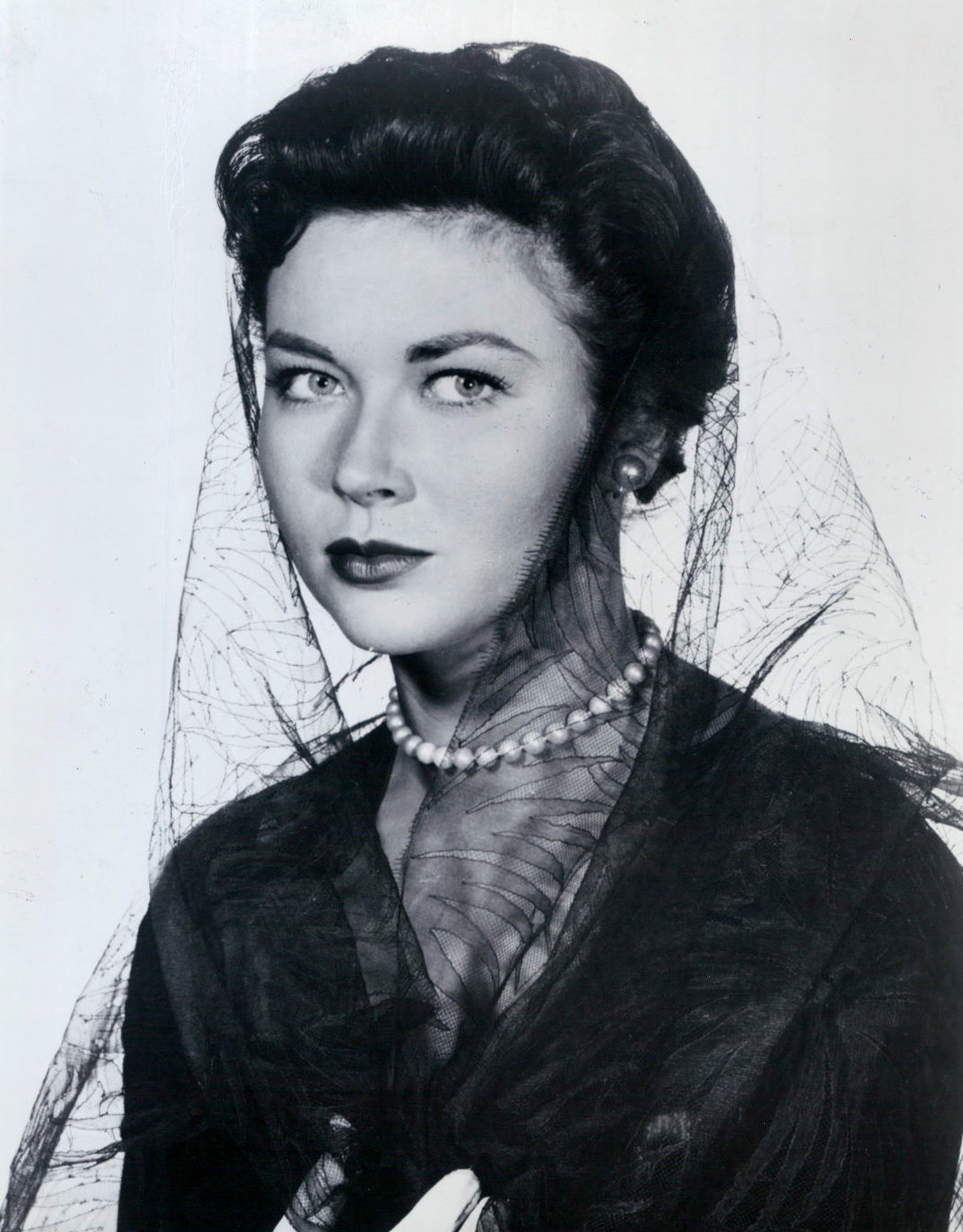
- Scala in Goodyear Theatre (1957)
- Born: Josephine Grace Johanna Scoglio; March 3, 1934; Liverpool, England
- Died: April 30, 1972 (aged 38); Los Angeles, California, U.S.
- Resting place: Holy Cross Cemetery
- Occupation: Actress
- Years active: 1955–1969
- Known for: The Guns of Navarone; Don't Go Near the Water; The Tunnel of Love; Ride a Crooked Trail
- Spouse: Don Burnett (m. 1959; div. 1970)

Gia Scala (born Josephine Grace Johanna Scoglio; March 3, 1934 – April 30, 1972) was a British and American actress.

== Early life ==
Scala was born March 3, 1934 in Liverpool, England to Sicilian father Pietro Scoglio and Irish mother Eileen O'Sullivan. She had one sister, Tina Scala, also an actress.

Scala was brought up in Messina and Mili San Marco in Sicily, the latter on the estate of her grandfather, Natale Scoglio, who owned one of the largest citrus growing operations in Sicily. When Scala was 16, she moved to the United States to live with her aunt Agata in Whitestone, Queens, New York City. After graduating from Bayside High School, she moved to Manhattan to pursue acting. Scala supported herself by working at a travel agency.

While she worked during the day for airlines and an insurance agency, Scala studied acting at night, with Stella Adler among her teachers. She met Steve McQueen, whom she dated from 1952 to 1954. Scala began to appear on game shows, including Stop the Music, where she was spotted by Maurice Bergman, an executive of Universal International located in New York City.

== Career ==
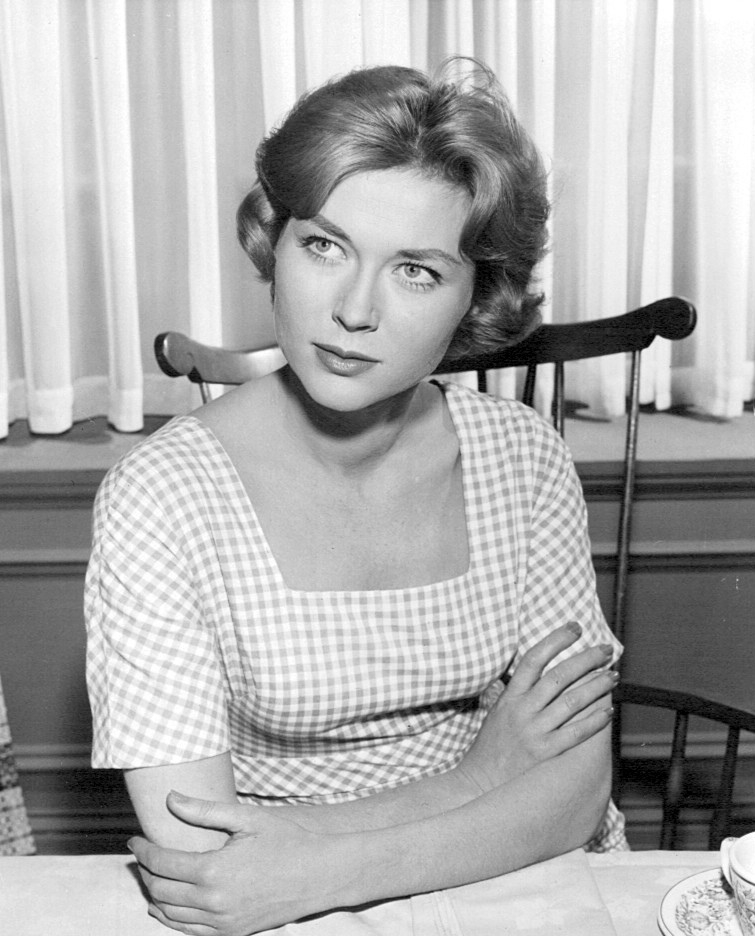
Scala in the 1960 Alfred Hitchcock Presents episode "Mother, May I Go Out to Swim?"

In 1954, accompanied by her mother, Scala flew to Los Angeles to screen test for the role of Mary Magdalene in The Gallileans. Although she did not get the part, Peter Johnson at Universal Studios was impressed with Scala's screen test. Scala had her first official job in Hollywood when she was given a non-speaking, uncredited part in the movie All That Heaven Allows, starring Rock Hudson. Despite her minor role in the movie, Universal Studios signed her to a contract, dyed her hair dark brown, had her four front teeth capped, and gave her the stage name Gia Scala.

Songwriter Henry Mancini met Scala on the set of Four Girls in Town. Inspired by her beauty, he wrote "Cha Cha for Gia", which appeared uncredited in the 1957 film.

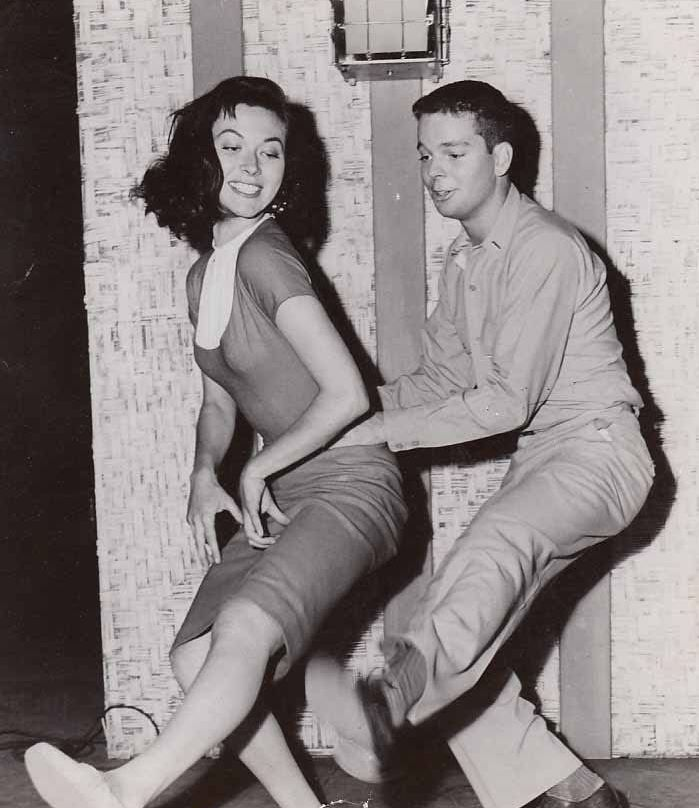
Scala and Russ Tamblyn in Don't Go Near the Water (1957)

Scala became emotionally distraught following the death of her mother in 1957. In 1958, she became a naturalized American citizen. Scala soon after landed roles in such films as Tip on a Dead Jockey (1957), The Garment Jungle (1957), The Tunnel of Love (1958), and The Guns of Navarone (1961).

Scala made frequent appearances on American television during the 1960s, appearing in such series as Alfred Hitchcock Presents, Convoy, The Islanders, The Rogues, Voyage to the Bottom of the Sea, Twelve O'Clock High, Tarzan, and It Takes a Thief (1969) in the episode "The Artist Is for Framing," her final acting role.

== Later years ==
On August 21, 1959, Scala married Don Burnett, an actor turned investment banker. After 11 years of marriage they divorced on September 1, 1970, and Burnett married actress Barbara Anderson. Scala had difficulties with alcohol and her career began to wane.

In 2015, author/researcher Sterling Saint James wrote a book about Gia Scala's life titled Gia Scala: The First Gia. Her sister, Tina, provided further details about her sister's life.

== Death ==
On the night of April 30, 1972, 38-year-old Scala was found dead in her Hollywood Hills home. Los Angeles County Coroner Thomas Noguchi reported her cause of death was from accidental "acute ethanol and barbiturate intoxication".

Scala is interred in the Holy Cross Cemetery in Culver City, California.

== Film and television credits ==
Year	Title	Role	Episode
1954	Stop the Music		
1955	All That Heaven Allows (uncredited)	Marguerita	
1956	Never Say Goodbye (uncredited)	Minnie	
1956	The Price of Fear	Nina Ferranti	
1957	Goodyear Theatre (TV)	Giovanna	
1957	Four Girls in Town	Vicki Dauray	
1957	The Big Boodle	Anita Ferrer	
1957	Don't Go Near the Water	Melora Alba	
1957	The Garment Jungle	Theresa Renata	
1957	Tip on a Dead Jockey	Paquita Heldon	
1958	Ride a Crooked Trail	Tessa Milotte	
1958	The Tunnel of Love	Estelle Novick	
1958	The Two-Headed Spy	Lili Geyr	
1959	The Angry Hills	Eleftheria	
1959	Battle of the Coral Sea	Karen Philips	
1960	I Aim at the Stars	Elizabeth Beyer	
1960	Alfred Hitchcock Presents (TV)	Lottie Rank	Season 5 Episode 26: "Mother, May I Go Out to Swim?"
1960	The Islanders (TV)	Rhea	"Duel of Strangers"
1961	The Guns of Navarone	Anna	
1961	Here's Hollywood (TV)	Herself	Episode 1.154
1961	Hong Kong (TV)	Maria Banda	"The Runaway"
1961	Alfred Hitchcock Presents (TV)	Lisa Talbot	Season 6 Episode 27: "Deathmate"
1962	The Triumph of Robin Hood	Anna	
1964	Operation Delilah	Dalida	
1964	The Alfred Hitchcock Hour (TV)	Kitty Frazier	Season 2 Episode 27: "The Sign of Satan"
1964	The Rogues (TV)	Simone Carnot	"Take Me to Paris"
1965	The Rogues (TV)	Lisa de Monfort	"The Laughing Lady of Luxor"
1965	Convoy (TV)	Madeline Duval	"Passage to Liverpool"
1965	Voyage to the Bottom of the Sea (TV)	Dr. Katya Markova	"Jonah and the Whale"
1965	Twelve O'Clock High (TV)	Ilka Zradna	"R/X for a Sick Bird"
1965	Run for Your Life (TV)	Marika Takacs	"How to Sell Your Soul for Fun & Profit"
1966	Jericho (TV)	Simone DuBray	"Upbeat & Underground"
1967	Tarzan (TV)	Martha Tolboth	"The Golden Runaway"
1969	The Name of the Game (TV)	Renata Marino	"The Inquiry"
1969	It Takes a Thief (TV)	Angel	"The Artist Is for Framing"
