= William Brinkley =

American writer and journalist (1917–1993)

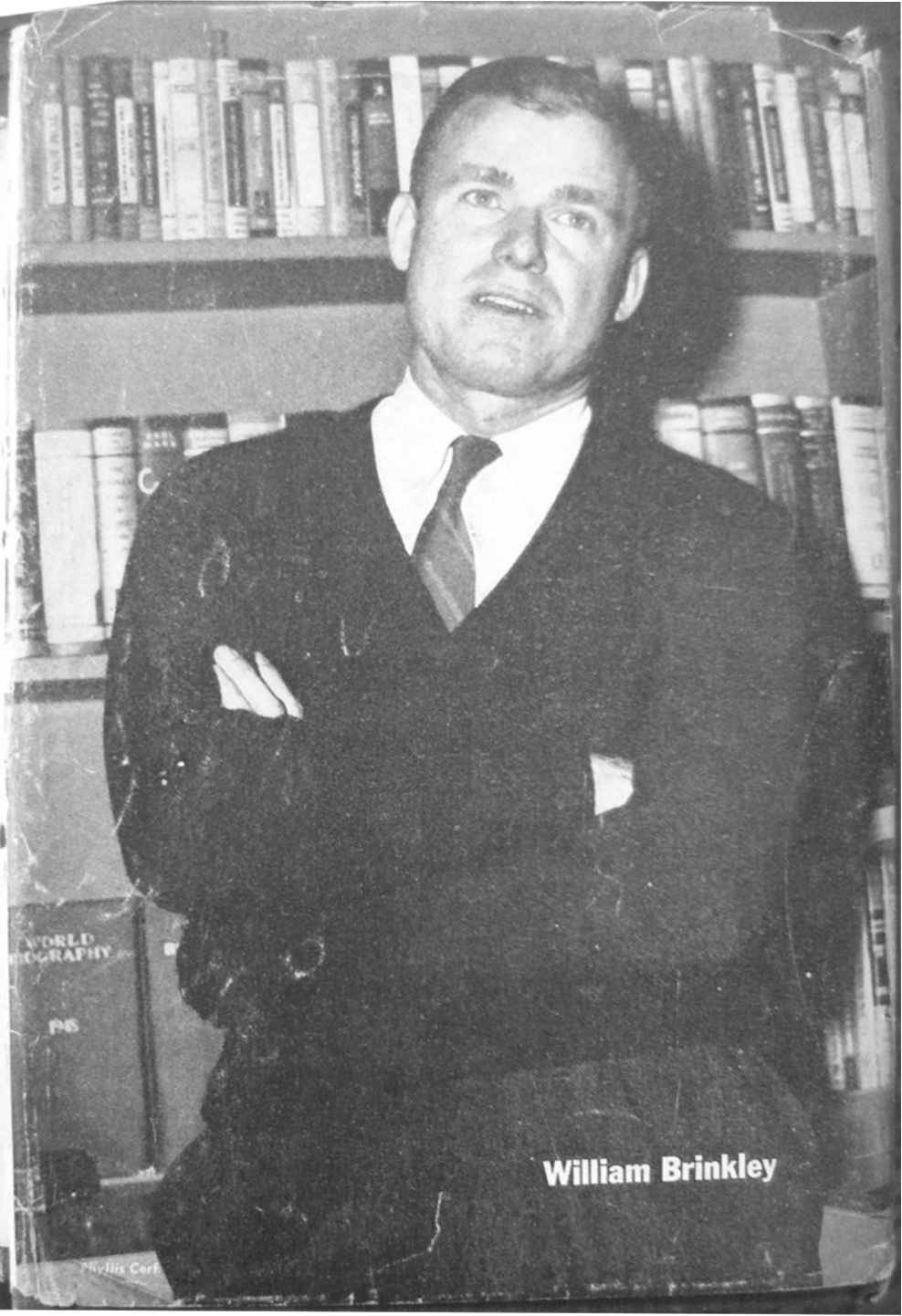
- Brinkley in the mid-1950s
- Born: William Clark Brinkley; September 10, 1917; Custer City, Oklahoma, U.S.
- Died: November 22, 1993 (aged 76); McAllen, Texas, U.S.
- Education: University of Oklahoma
- Occupations: Novelist; journalist; naval officer; writer; editor; reporter
- Spouses: Jean Brinkley
- Children: David Shelander (stepson)
- Writing career
- Language: English
- Period: 1948–1988
- Genres: Post-apocalyptic, fiction, comedy, non-fiction
- Notable works: Don't Go Near the Water (1956); The Last Ship (1988)

William Clark Brinkley (September 10, 1917 – November 22, 1993) was an American writer and journalist, best known for his novels Don't Go Near the Water (1956), which Metro-Goldwyn-Mayer adapted to an eponymous 1957 film, and The Last Ship (1988), which TNT adapted as a television series.

== Early life and education ==
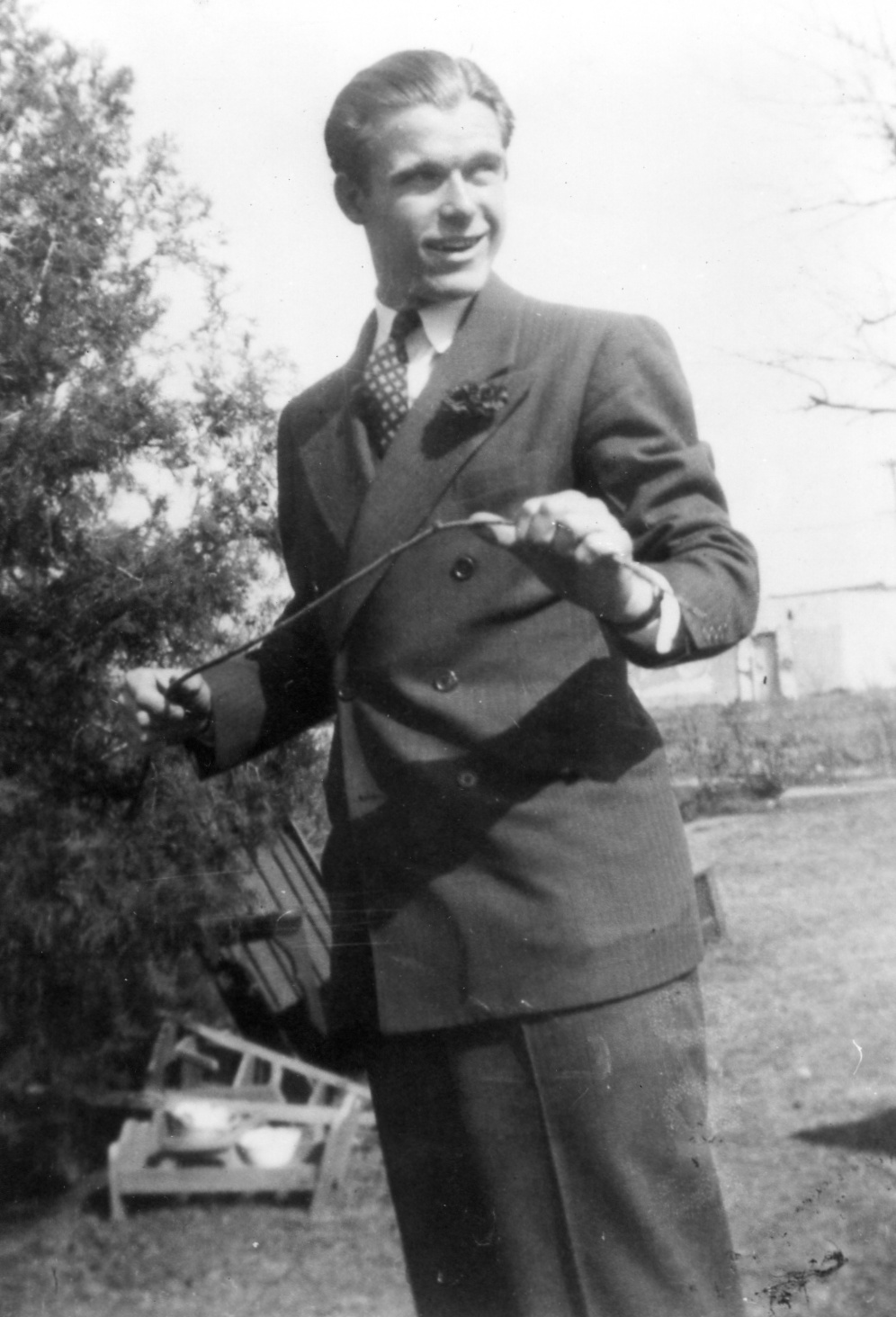
Brinkley as a young man

Brinkley was born in Custer City, Oklahoma on September 10, 1917, the son of Daniel Squire Brinkley, a Baptist minister. The youngest of five children, Brinkley graduated Phi Beta Kappa from the University of Oklahoma in 1940.

== Career ==
=== Naval service ===
Brinkley was a commissioned officer in the United States Navy during World War II. He served in Europe and the Pacific, primarily in public relations duties.

=== Writing ===
After graduating from the University of Oklahoma in 1940, Brinkley worked for The Daily Oklahoman in Oklahoma City, Oklahoma. Afterwards, he was a reporter for The Washington Post from 1941 to 1942 and from 1949 to 1951. In the latter period, he wrote an article about an exorcism that later became the basis of William Peter Blatty's bestselling novel The Exorcist (1971). Brinkley was also a staff writer, correspondent, and assistant editor for Life magazine from 1951 to 1958, and a member of the National Press Club until his death in 1993.

After his tenure as an officer in the U.S. Navy, Brinkley wrote and published his first novel, Quicksand (1948). In 1954, Brinkley published his only non-fiction book, The Deliverance of Sister Cecelia, a biography of a Czechoslovak nun based on her memoirs as recited to him. The novel was later adapted into a 1955 episode of Climax!. In 1956, he released the best-selling novel and perhaps his most prominent work, Don't Go Near the Water, a comedy about U.S. Navy sailors serving in the South Pacific during World War II. Don't Go Near the Water was adapted into film by Metro-Goldwyn-Mayer as Don't Go Near the Water (1957), which was released in theaters across the United States and became both a critical and commercial success.

In peacetime Lieutenant Commander Clinton T. Nash had been in charge of a Merill Lynch, Pierce, Fenner and Beane office in the Midwest. Not long after Pearl Harbor he had been commissioned directly from his brokerage office without the corrupting effect of any intervening naval training.
William Brinkley, Don't Go Near the Water, Chapter 1.

In 1961, Brinkley published The Fun House, a comedy novel set in the offices of a picture magazine similar to Life. The following year, Brinkley published the novel, The Two Susans (1962), which was followed by The Ninety and Nine (1966), a novel detailing life on board a United States Navy LST operating in the Mediterranean Sea and at Anzio during World War II.

In 1971, Brinkley moved to McAllen, Texas, where he lived until his death in 1993. Throughout the 1970s, he only wrote one novel, Breakpoint (1978), about tennis.

Breakpoint was followed by Peeper (December 1981), a comedy novel about a voyeur in the small town of Martha, Texas, near the Rio Grande. In March 1988, Brinkley published his last work, The Last Ship, a post-apocalyptic fiction novel dealing with the sailors of the USS Nathan James (DDG-80), a fictional United States Navy guided missile destroyer which survives a brief, full-scale global nuclear war between the United States and the Soviet Union.

== Death ==
Brinkley died on November 22, 1993, at the age of 76, at his home in McAllen, Texas, near the Gulf of Mexico. The cause of death was suicide. He was cremated and his ashes were scattered in the Gulf of Mexico.

== Bibliography ==
=== Novels ===
- Brinkley, William (1948). Quicksand.
- Brinkley, William (1956). Don't Go Near the Water.
- Brinkley, William (1961). The Fun House.
- Brinkley, William (1962). The Two Susans.
- Brinkley, William (1966). The Ninety and Nine. Garden City, N.Y., Doubleday.
- Brinkley, William (1978). Breakpoint.
- Brinkley, William (1981). Peeper. Viking Press. ISBN 9780670697519.
- Brinkley, William (1988). The Last Ship. New York: Viking Press. ISBN 0-670-80981-0. OCLC 16682861.

=== Non-fiction ===
- Brinkley, William (1954). The Deliverance of Sister Cecelia.
