= Max Shulman =

American writer and humorist (1919–1988)

- Born: Maximilian Shulman; March 14, 1919; Saint Paul, Minnesota
- Died: August 28, 1988 (aged 69); Los Angeles, California
- Education: University of Minnesota
- Occupations: Writer and humorist
- Spouse(s): Carol S. Rees (1941–1963, her death); Mary Gordon Bryant (1964–1988, his death)
- Children: 5, including Martha Rose Shulman
- Writing career
- Notable works: Dobie Gillis character, in The Many Loves of Dobie Gillis and other works

Maximilian Shulman (March 14, 1919 – August 28, 1988) was an American writer and humorist best known for his television and short story character Dobie Gillis, as well as for best-selling novels.

== Biography ==
=== Early life and career ===
Shulman was born in St. Paul, Minnesota, and raised in the city's Selby-Dale neighborhood. His father Abraham, a house painter, and his mother Bessie Karchmar were Jewish immigrants from Belarus.

As a student at the University of Minnesota, where he was classmate of Thomas Heggen, Thomas R. St. George and Norman Katkov, Shulman wrote a column for the Minnesota Daily as well as pieces for Ski-U-Mah, the college humor magazine. His writing humorously exaggerated campus culture. Shortly after Shulman graduated in 1942, an agent from Doubleday persuaded Shulman to send him some clips, which resulted in the campus satire Barefoot Boy with Cheek, a surprise 1943 bestseller. In 1947 Shulman adapted Barefoot Boy into a musical of the same name.

=== Later career ===
Shulman's works include the novels Rally Round the Flag, Boys!, which was made into a film starring Paul Newman, Joanne Woodward and Joan Collins; The Feather Merchants; The Zebra Derby; Sleep till Noon; and Potatoes Are Cheaper.

In 1954 he co-wrote (with Robert Paul Smith) the Broadway play The Tender Trap starring Robert Preston but it was not a success; the work was later adapted into a movie starring Frank Sinatra and Debbie Reynolds. He wrote the libretto for the 1968 musical How Now, Dow Jones, which was nominated for a Tony Award for Best Musical.

Shulman's collegiate character Dobie Gillis was the subject of a series of short stories compiled under the title The Many Loves of Dobie Gillis, which became the basis for the 1953 movie The Affairs of Dobie Gillis, followed by a CBS television series, The Many Loves of Dobie Gillis (1959–1963). Shulman was a script writer for the series and also wrote the lyrics for the series' theme song (music was composed by Lionel Newman). The same year the series began, Shulman published another Dobie Gillis story collection, I Was a Teenage Dwarf (1959). After his initial success with Dobie Gillis in the early 1950s, Shulman syndicated a humor column, "On Campus", to over 350 collegiate newspapers at one point.. He piloted another series for CBS for the 1961 season "Daddy-O", which showed behind-the-scenes of TV sitcom production. It was turned down by CBS. He wrote a TV movie for CBS, Help Wanted: MALE, that got a 47 share of the audience and was the second highest rated movie-of-the-week of the year.

A later novel, Anyone Got a Match?, satirized both the television and tobacco industries (which was ironic as his "On Campus" column was sponsored by a cigarette company), as well as the South and college football. His last major project was House Calls, which began as a 1978 movie based on one of his stories, and starred Walter Matthau and Glenda Jackson; it spun off the 1979–1982 television series of the same name, starring Wayne Rogers and Lynn Redgrave in the leads. Shulman was the head writer.

Shulman was one of the collaborators on a 1954 non-fiction television program Light's Diamond Jubilee, timed to the 75th anniversary of the invention of the light bulb.

=== Family ===
Shulman married twice: he had four children from his first marriage with Carol S. Rees (21 December 1941 – 17 May 1963, her death) and one child from his second marriage with Mary Gordon Bryant (14 June 1964 – 28 August 1988, his death).

His daughter, Martha Rose Shulman, is a cookbook author.

Max Shulman died August 28, 1988, of bone cancer at the age of 69 in Los Angeles, California.

== Selected bibliography ==
- Barefoot Boy with Cheek (1943)
- The Feather Merchants (1944)
- The Zebra Derby (1946)
- Max Shulman's Large Economy Size (1948), includes Barefoot Boy with Cheek, The Feather Merchants, The Zebra Derby
- Sleep till Noon (1950)
- The Many Loves of Dobie Gillis (1951)
- Max Shulman's Guided Tour of Campus Humor (1955)
- Rally Round the Flag Boys! (1957)
- Rally Round the Flag, Boys! (1958) — (film)
- I Was a Teenage Dwarf (1959)
- Anyone Got a Match? (1964)
- Potatoes Are Cheaper (1971)
