= Robert Paul Smith =

American dramatist

Robert Paul Smith (April 16, 1915 – January 30, 1977) was an American author, most famous for his classic evocation of childhood, Where Did You Go? Out. What Did You Do? Nothing.

== Biography ==
Robert Paul Smith was born in Brooklyn, grew up in Mount Vernon, NY, and graduated from Columbia College in 1936. He worked as a writer for CBS Radio and wrote four novels: So It Doesn't Whistle (1946) (1941, according to Avon Publishing Co., Inc., reprint edition ... Plus Blood in Their Veins copyright 1952); The Journey, (1943); Because of My Love (1946); The Time and the Place (1951).

The Tender Trap, a play by Smith and Dobie Gillis creator Max Shulman, opened in 1954 with Robert Preston in the leading role. It was later made into a movie starring Frank Sinatra and Debbie Reynolds. A classic example of the "battle-of-the-sexes" comedy, it revolves around the mutual envy of a bachelor living in New York City and a settled family man living in the New York suburbs.

Where Did You Go? Out. What Did You Do? Nothing is a nostalgic evocation of the inner life of childhood. It advocates the value of privacy to children; the importance of unstructured time; the joys of boredom; and the virtues of freedom from adult supervision. He opens by saying "The thing is, I don't understand what kids do with themselves any more." He contrasts the overstructured, overscheduled, oversupervised suburban life of the child in the suburban 1950's with reminiscences of his own childhood. He concludes "I guess what I am saying is that people who don't have nightmares don't have dreams. If you will excuse me, I have an appointment with myself to sit on the front steps and watch some grass growing."

Translations from the English (1958) collects a series of articles originally published in Good Housekeeping magazine. The first, "Translations from the Children," may be the earliest known example of the genre of humor that consists of a series of translations from what is said (e.g. "I don't know why. He just hit me") into what is meant (e.g. "He hit his brother.")

How to Do Nothing With Nobody All Alone By Yourself (1958) is a how-to book, illustrated by Robert Paul Smith's wife Elinor Goulding Smith. It gives step-by-step directions on how to: play mumbly-peg; build a spool tank; make polly-noses; construct an indoor boomerang, etc. It was republished in 2010 by Tin House Books.

== List of works ==
=== Essays and humor ===
Where Did You Go? Out. What Did You Do? Nothing (1957)
Translations from the English (1958)
Crank: A Book of Lamentations, Exhortations, Mixed Memories and Desires, All Hard Or Chewy Centers, No Creams(1962)
How to Grow Up in One Piece (1963)
Got to Stop Draggin’ that Little Red Wagon Around (1969)
Robert Paul Smith’s Lost & Found (1973)

=== For children ===
Jack Mack, illus. Erik Blegvad (1960)
When I Am Big, illus. Lillian Hoban (1965)
Nothingatall, Nothingatall, Nothingatall, illus. Allan E. Cober (1965)
How To Do Nothing With No One All Alone By Yourself, illus Elinor Goulding Smith (1958) Republished by Tin House Books (2010)

=== Novels ===
So It Doesn't Whistle (1941)
The Journey (1943)
Because of My Love (1946)
The Time and the Place (1952)
Where He Went: Three Novels (1958)

=== Theatre ===
The Tender Trap, by Max Shulman and Robert Paul Smith (first Broadway performance, 1954; Random House edition, 1955)

=== Verse ===
The Man with the Gold-headed Cane (1943)
…and Another Thing (1959)
