= Looney Tunes and Merrie Melodies filmography =

The Looney Tunes and Merrie Melodies series had many short films, feature films, television series, and television specials released, extending from 1930 through the present day. Altogether, 1,018 animated shorts alone were released under the Looney Tunes and Merrie Melodies banners from the 1930s to 2014 (999 official (1930–1969), 2 cut downs (1965), and 17 revival shorts (1987–2014)). From the beginning to the present day, 1,039 theatrical shorts have been created.

== 1930s ==
A total of 271 shorts were produced and theatrically released under the Looney Tunes and Merrie Melodies banners during the 1930s. Additionally at least one short was produced in the 1930s, but never publicly released in theaters. A private Warner Bros. end-of-year blooper reel with animated sequences featuring Porky Pig was included.

Title	Animated by	Recurring characters	Original release date
Bosko and Honey	Rollin Hamilton & Robert McKimson	Bosko; Honey; Bruno; Wilber	1999
The original version of what would later become Bosko's Dizzy Date. This version was planned for a theatrical release and was originally produced in 1932, but the Bosko's Dizzy Date version was released instead. It was not released to the public until in 1999 when it was released on VHS. This version is also in the public domain.
Breakdowns of 1939	Rod Scribner	Porky Pig	January 1, 1939
Annual Warner Bros. blooper reel in which included several sequences of Porky Pig swearing. Porky's sequences were edited together and released as a bonus on the Looney Tunes Golden Collection: Volume 4 DVD set.

== 1940s ==
A total of 306 shorts were produced and theatrically released under the Looney Tunes and Merrie Melodies banners during the 1940s. Additionally, Bugs Bunny was featured in a government-sponsored short for U.S. Department of the Treasury, but he also made a cameo appearance in two Private Snafu shorts, in one Puppetoon short, and in two Warner Bros. live-action features.

Four of the seven additional shorts from this decade (those made for the U.S. government) are in the public domain.

Title	Directed by	Written by	Animated by	Recurring characters	Original release date
Bugs Bunny	Bob Clampett	N/A	Virgil Ross, Robert McKimson, Gerry Chiniquy & Rod Scribner	Bugs Bunny; Porky Pig; Elmer Fudd	April 2, 1942
A propaganda short for World War II bonds featuring the song "Any Bonds Today?".
Fighting Tools	Bob Clampett	P. D. Eastman	Robert McKimson, Cal Dalton, Virgil Ross & Rod Scribner	Daffy Duck	September 13, 1943
Daffy Duck makes a cameo appearance in this Private Snafu film.
Gas	Chuck Jones	Dr. Seuss	Robert "Bobe" Cannon, Ken Harris, Phil Monroe & Ben Washam	Bugs Bunny	May 29, 1944
Bugs Bunny makes a cameo appearance in this Private Snafu film.
Jasper Goes Hunting	George Pal	Jack Miller & George Pal	Robert McKimson	Bugs Bunny	July 28, 1944
Bugs Bunny makes a cameo appearance in this Puppetoons film.
Three Brothers	Friz Freleng	Dr. Seuss	Ken Champin, Gerry Chiniquy, Manuel Perez, Virgil Ross & Jack Bradbury	Bugs Bunny	December 4, 1944
Bugs Bunny makes a cameo appearance in this Private Snafu film.
Two Guys from Texas	Friz Freleng	I. A. L. Diamond & Allen Boretz	Ken Champin, Gerry Chiniquy, Manuel Perez & Virgil Ross	Bugs Bunny	August 27, 1948
Bugs Bunny makes a cameo appearance in this live-action Warner Bros. film.
My Dream Is Yours	Friz Freleng	Story by : Jerry Wald & Paul Finder Moss; Adapted by : Allen Rivkin & Laura Kerr; Screenplay by : Harry Kurnitz & Dane Lussier	Ken Champin, Gerry Chiniquy, Arthur Davis, Ken Harris, Manuel Perez & Virgil Ross	Bugs Bunny; Tweety	April 15, 1949
Bugs Bunny and Tweety make cameo appearances in this live-action Warner Bros. film.

=== Unproduced ===
Title	Directed by	Written by	Animated by	Recurring characters	Production year
For He's A Jolly Good Fala	Bob Clampett	Bob Clampett	N/A	N/A	1945
This cartoon would've featured Fala; voice recording was underway when it was cancelled after the death of President Franklin D. Roosevelt.

== 1950s ==
A total of 278 shorts were produced and theatrically released under the Looney Tunes and Merrie Melodies banners during the 1950s. There were no additional shorts produced during the decade.

== 1960s ==
A total of 146 shorts were produced and theatrically released under the Looney Tunes and Merrie Melodies banners during the 1960s (144 official and 2 cut downs). Additionally, an unaired television cartoon pilot featuring Wile E. Coyote and the Road Runner was theatrically screened instead.

Title	Directed by	Written by	Animated by	Recurring characters	Original release date
Adventures of the Road Runner	Chuck Jones; Co-Directors: Maurice Noble and Tom Ray	John Dunn, Chuck Jones & Michael Maltese	Ken Harris, Richard Thompson, Ben Washam, Tom Ray & Bob Bransford	Wile E. Coyote and the Road Runner; Ralph Phillips	June 2, 1962
An unsold television pilot rejected by ABC, screened in theaters. The pilot was later cut down into three shorts: To Beep or Not to Beep (1963), Road Runner a Go-Go (1965), and Zip Zip Hooray! (1965). The full cartoon is present on disc 2 of the Looney Tunes Golden Collection: Volume 2 DVD as a special feature.

== 1970s–present ==
Since the end of the regular production of the series in 1969, Warner Bros. has occasionally produced new Looney Tunes shorts that have been released theatrically.

== See also ==
- Warner Bros. Entertainment
- Looney Tunes Golden Collection
- The Golden Age of Looney Tunes
