= Love and Kisses =

Love and Kisses may refer to:

- Hugs and kisses, also love and kisses
- Love and Kisses (film), a film released in 1965
- Love and Kisses (play), a play by Anita Rowe Block
- Love and Kisses (TV series), a 1955 British TV sitcom
- Love and Kisses (Dannii Minogue album), 1991
- Love and Kisses (Rick Nelson album), 1965
- Love and Kisses from Brotherhood of Man, a 1976 album by Brotherhood of Man, often referred to as simply Love and Kisses
- "Love and Kisses" (song), a song by Dannii Minogue
- Love & Kisses, a 1970s disco group
