= Grounds for Marriage =

1951 film by Robert Zigler Leonard

- Theatrical release poster
- Directed by: Robert Z. Leonard
- Screenplay by: Laura Kerr; Allen Rivkin
- Story by: Samuel Marx
- Produced by: Samuel Marx
- Starring: Van Johnson; Kathryn Grayson; Paula Raymond
- Cinematography: John Alton
- Edited by: Fredrick Y. Smith
- Music by: Bronislau Kaper
- Production company: Metro-Goldwyn-Mayer
- Distributed by: Loew's Inc.
- Release date: January 11, 1951 (New York)
- Running time: 90 minutes
- Country: United States
- Language: English
- Budget: $1,173,000
- Box office: $1,587,000

Grounds for Marriage is a 1951 American romantic comedy film written and produced by Samuel Marx, directed by Robert Z. Leonard and starring Van Johnson, Kathryn Grayson and Paula Raymond.

== Plot ==
Ina Massine is an opera diva who divorced throat specialist Dr. Lincoln "Linc" I. Bartlett three years earlier. She now regrets this decision and wants to regain his affection. However, Linc is engaged to Agnes (Oglethorpe) Young, the beautiful young daughter of his mentor, Dr. Carleton Radwin Young. Ina is determined to reconcile with Linc and grabs every chance to try to seduce him. Linc remains loyal to Agnes and grows irritated by Ina's attempts to impress him. On the night of the premiere of her latest opera, La bohème, Ina is bothered with a sore throat and calls Dr. Young. Linc, who is replacing Dr. Young that night, suspects that Ina is faking her condition. However, when he examines her, he diagnoses a tropical disease she had possibly contracted in South America.

Ina ignores his diagnosis and performs that night without any problems. The next morning, after becoming upset with Linc and screaming at his portrait, she is suddenly unable to speak. She visits Dr. Young, who diagnoses aphonia, a speaking disorder that can be caused by receiving shocking news. Young advises psychiatric help and tells Linc that a new love interest for Ina could solve the problem. Ina is assigned as Linc's client, displeasing Agnes. Although Linc assures Agnes several times that he has no feelings for his ex-wife, she remains suspicious of his connection with Ina.

Linc contacts his brother Chris Bartlett, hoping that he will be able to romance Ina. He arranges a date, but Ina shows no interest in Chris and is only able to think of Linc. Later that night, Ina is able to convince Linc to spend the evening with her. On their way back home, Ina again attempts to seduce him. Although Linc does not respond, he seems to have become more receptive to her advances. Several nights later, with Ina staying in his apartment to care for his severe cold, Linc experiences a feverish nightmare and awakens screaming for Ina and realizes that he still harbors feelings for Ina. As he hugs her, Ina's voice suddenly returns just as Agnes and Chris enter. Agnes, feeling betrayed, cancels the engagement despite Linc's attempts to explain. Ina announces that she has also lost patience with the love triangle and angrily departs while wearing Linc's pajamas. She soon returns and is told by Chris that Linc is now suffering from aphonia. Ina interprets this to mean that Linc still loves her. She agrees to marry him again and they kiss, restoring his voice.

== Cast ==
- Van Johnson as Dr. Lincoln I. Bartlett
- Kathryn Grayson as Ina Massine
- Paula Raymond as Agnes Oglethorpe Young
- Barry Sullivan as Chris Bartlett
- Reginald Owen as Dely Delacorte
- Lewis Stone as Dr. Carleton Radwin Young
- Richard Hageman as Dr. Engelstaat
- Richard Anderson as Tommy
- Firehouse Five Plus Two as Themselves
- Emory Parnell as Cop

== Production ==
Robert Walker was cast in the lead male role but was replaced by Van Johnson. Although the film was initially intended as a vehicle for June Allyson, Kathryn Grayson was assigned the female lead, her first non-singing role. It is Johnson and Grayson's first film together.

The film's operatic sequences were staged by Vladimir Rosing.

Grounds for Marriage was meant to be an escapist fare, distracting people from the Korean War.

== Reception ==
In a contemporary review for The New York Times, critic Bosley Crowther wrote: "A disturbance called 'functional aphonia,' or temporary loss of voice, is allowed to afflict Kathryn Grayson through the better part of her time in M·G-M's 'Grounds for Marriage' ... And this means, of course, that Miss Grayson is rendered unable to sing for a lengthy stretch in this picture when her talents might be most well employed. In view of the fact that the writers have provided little else to fill the void, we can only assume that they, too, were suffering—from, perhaps, a temporary loss of mind."

MGM records attest that the film earned $1,116,000 in the U.S. and Canada and $471,000 elsewhere, resulting in a loss of $168,000.

== Adaptation ==
Johnson and Grayson reprised their roles in a 1952 broadcast for Lux Radio Theatre.
