= Anita Rowe Block =

American writer (1915–1979)

- Born: Anita Wangrow; February 7, 1915; New York City, New York, U.S.
- Died: July 1979 (aged 64); New Jersey
- Occupations: Novelist; short story writer; playwright
- Writing career
- Period: 1944-1963
- Notable work: Love and Kisses

Anita Rowe Block (born Anita Wangrow; February 7, 1915 – July 1979) was an American novelist, playwright, and short story writer. She wrote the short story anthology Love Is a Four Letter Word (1958) and the novel Necessary End (1960). Her play Love and Kisses was staged on Broadway in 1963, and later adapted into a 1965 film released by Universal Pictures.

== Life and career ==
The daughter of David and Hannah Wangrow, Anita Wangrow was born in New York City on 7 February 1915. On May 8, 1934, she married Melvin A. Block. Her husband was the son of the founder of Block Drug and Melvin succeeded his father as president of that company. The couple lived in Deal, New Jersey. They had two children, James and Susan.

Block started writing during World War II while her husband was serving in the United States Air Force. Bored with her life at a military base in the American South, she began writing for women's magazines to entertain herself. She contributed short stories to Cosmopolitan and Collier's Weekly. In 1958, a collection of her short stories, Love Is a Four Letter Word, was published by Doubleday. It was republished in 1960 and 1970. She also wrote the novel Necessary End (1960, Doubleday), a book about a successful and ambitious pharmaceutical businessman suddenly confronting the diagnosis of debilitating cardiac disease.

In November 1963 Block's play Love and Kisses about teenage marriage was given its premiere in Boston at the Wilbur Theatre. The following month it transferred to Broadway's Music Box Theatre in a production directed and produced by Dore Schary. It received mixed reviews in the press. While it only had a short run, it was adapted into the 1965 film of the same name starring Ricky Nelson. It has been revived multiple times in American regional theatre..

Block died in New Jersey in July 1979 at the age of 64. She was a member of Temple Beth Miriam in Elberon, New Jersey.
