= Affairs of Geraldine =

1946 film by George Blair

- Directed by: George Blair
- Screenplay by: John K. Butler
- Story by: Lee Loeb; Arthur Strawn
- Produced by: Armand Schaefer
- Starring: Jane Withers; Jimmy Lydon; Raymond Walburn; Donald Meek
- Cinematography: John Alton
- Edited by: Tony Martinelli
- Music by: Nathan Scott
- Production company: Republic Pictures
- Distributed by: Republic Pictures
- Release date: November 18, 1946
- Running time: 68 minutes
- Country: United States
- Language: English

Affairs of Geraldine is a 1946 American comedy film directed by George Blair and written by John K. Butler. The film stars Jane Withers, Jimmy Lydon, Raymond Walburn, Donald Meek, Charles Quigley and Grant Withers. The film was released on November 18, 1946, by Republic Pictures.

== Plot ==
After Mrs. Cooper dies, her very valuable estate is left to her children. Her sons Henry and Wayne are privy to a private recording in which Mrs. Cooper expresses her last wishes that the boys help find a suitable husband for their tomboy sister, Geraldine. At the time Geraldine is only interested in the Cooperville's town fire truck. Henry and Wayne, somewhat forcefully, insist that a few young men into attending a birthday party for Geraldine in hopes that she will find one of them to be to her liking. Instead, Geraldine resents her brothers for trying to force a boyfriend on her. When party guest Lisa Jane Dennis plays the previously private message for everyone to hear, Geraldine is embarrassed; and town baker Willy Briggs, who secretly loves her, feels sorry for her having had to endure the embarrassment. Geraldine decides to jump on a train out of town, where she meets Casper Millhouse, who sympathizes with her troubles.

Casper suggest that Geraldine show the people of Cooperville that she is capable of finding a man all on her own. Casper introduces her to a Lonely Hearts club founder Amos Hartwell, the person and club that helped him find his fiancé, Belle Walker. Geraldine meets with Amos, suggests a dance party, and soon becomes an organizer for more "meet-and-greet" social gatherings. Her management abilities soon lead to radio show "Cupid Speaking" where Amos becomes a national sensation. When Gerry becomes depressed at not finding her own romantic partner, Amos suggests that she come on the radio show as the mysterious "Madame L'Amour", who gives advice as a worldly romance specialist. When Casper is beset with Belle eloping with con-artist, Geraldine promises to help him, and begins to search for Belle. Madame L'Amour, responds to a letter from Willy, who then deduces that it's actually his missing love Geraldine. Willy sets out to find her in the big city, and capture the heart of Geraldine, who has now become attracted to a supposedly wealthy J. Edmund Roberts.

Willy attends one of the club dances, and kisses a blindfolded Geraldine, who faints out of excitement. Then Roberts claims to be the one who planted the kiss, and agrees to marry him. After Geraldine and Roberts return to Cooperville, and she reunites with her brothers, they are pleased that their sister has finally found a man. Then the reunited couple of Casper and Belle discover that Geraldine is being hoodwinked by the same man that swindled Belle. Amos also discovers that Roberts also conned other women, and calls Willy, who then rushes to stall the Geraldine's wedding. When the truth comes out Roberts is arrested for bigamy; then Willy and Geraldine kiss, and she realizes that Willy is the only man for her. When her beloved fire truck is called into action by a fire alarm, Geraldine no longer cares, and is satisfied to be in Willy's arms.

== Cast ==
- Jane Withers as Geraldine Cooper
- Jimmy Lydon as Willy Briggs
- Raymond Walburn as Amos Hartwell
- Donald Meek as Casper Millhouse
- Charles Quigley as J. Edmund Roberts
- Grant Withers as Henry Cooper
- William Haade as Wayne Cooper
- Archie Twitchell as Charlie March
- Johnny Sands as Danny
- David Holt as Percy McBride
- Tanis Chandler as Liza Jane Dennis
- Harry Cheshire as Judge Fricke
- Josephine Whittell as Belle Walker
- Donia Bussey as Mrs. Bessie Hutchinson
- Edith M. Griffith as Mrs. Eddington
- George M. Carleton as Lawyer Darnell
