= Dore Schary =

American dramatist and film producer (1905–1980)

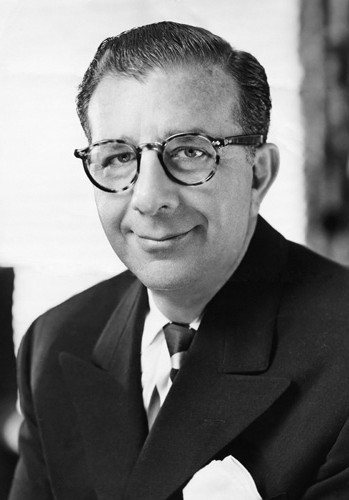
- Schary in 1958
- Born: Isadore Schary; August 31, 1905; Newark, New Jersey, US
- Died: July 7, 1980 (aged 74); New York City, U.S.
- Occupations: Screenwriter; playwright; film director; studio executive; actor
- Spouse: Miriam Svet (m. 1932)
- Children: 3, including Jill Schary Robinson
- Relatives: Jeremy Zimmer (grandson)

Isadore "Dore" Schary (August 31, 1905 – July 7, 1980) was an American playwright, director, and producer for the stage and a prolific screenwriter and producer of motion pictures. He directed one feature film, Act One, the film biography of his friend, playwright and theatre director Moss Hart. He became head of production at Metro-Goldwyn-Mayer and replaced Louis B. Mayer as president of the studio in 1951.

== Early life ==
Schary was born to a Jewish family in Newark, New Jersey. Schary's father ran a catering business called the Schary Manor. Dore attended Central High School for a year but dropped out to sell haberdashery and buy china. When he finally returned to school, he completed his three remaining years of classwork in one year, graduating in 1923.

Schary worked as a journalist, did publicity for a lecture tour by Rear Adm. Richard E. Byrd, and was an assistant drama coach at the Young Men's Hebrew Association in Newark. The head coach was Moss Hart.

== Career ==
=== Theatre ===
Schary worked in theatre as an actor and writer. In 1927 he got a bit part on Broadway in a play with Paul Muni. Then he worked with Hart at a summer resort in the Catskill Mountains, where they wrote, produced, and directed skits and plays.

Schary appeared on Broadway in The Last Mile with Spencer Tracy. He wrote a play which was read by film producer Walter Wanger, who wired his New York office: "Hire Dore Schary. She writes with a lot of vigor – for a woman." Wanger subsequently hired Schary as a $100-a-week film writer. Schary moved to Hollywood, but his option with Wanger was dropped after three months. In his autobiography Heyday (1979), Schary also credits theatrical agent Frieda Fishbein in getting him to Hollywood, by introducing him to Harry Cohn, "the Maharajah of Columbia".

=== Early films ===
Schary's early writing credits include He Couldn't Take It (1933) for Monogram, and Fury of the Jungle (1933) and Fog (1933) at Columbia.

Schary worked on Let's Talk It Over (1934) for Universal, The Most Precious Thing in Life (1934) at Columbia, and Young and Beautiful (1934) at Universal. Other work for Universal included Storm Over the Andes (1935), Chinatown Squad (1935), and (uncredited) The Raven (1935).

At Warners, Schary wrote Murder in the Clouds (1934) and Red Hot Tires (1935). He did some uncredited work on Paramount's Mississippi (1935), and wrote for Republic's Racing Luck (1935).

Schary went to Fox for Silk Hat Kid (1935), Your Uncle Dudley (1935) and Song and Dance Man (1936). He was briefly under contract at MGM for a few months in 1936.

At Paramount Schary did Timothy's Quest (1936), Mind Your Own Business (1936), Her Master's Voice (1936), Outcast (1937), and The Girl from Scotland Yard (1937). He did Ladies in Distress (1937) at Republic.

Schary's play Too Many Heroes ran on Broadway for 16 performances in the fall of 1937.

=== Work at MGM ===
At MGM Schary worked on two Spencer Tracy films, Big City (1937) and Boys Town (1938). Schary earned Oscar nominations on the latter for Best Screenplay and Best Story, winning for Best Story.

Schary went on to write Broadway Melody of 1940 (1940), Young Tom Edison (1940) with Mickey Rooney and Edison, the Man (1940) with Tracy. He also worked on Married Bachelor (1941). For Republic, Schary wrote Behind the News (1940).

MGM promoted Schary to producer of their "B" pictures unit. Schary began with Joe Smith, American (1942), based on Schary's own story, which became a solid hit. Kid Glove Killer (1942), the directorial debut for Fred Zinnemann, was also profitable.

Journey for Margaret (1942) was a big success, making a star of Margaret O'Brien. Bataan (1943) made a profit of over one million dollars. Lassie Come Home (1943) with Roddy McDowall and Elizabeth Taylor had a profit of over two million.

=== Vanguard Films ===
Schary accepted an offer to go to work for David O. Selznick's Vanguard Films as head of the production. He produced I'll Be Seeing You (1944), The Spiral Staircase (1946), Till the End of Time (1946), The Farmer's Daughter (1947) with Loretta Young, and The Bachelor and the Bobby-Soxer (1947) with Cary Grant, Myrna Loy and Shirley Temple. All films were considered critical and commercial successes.

=== Head of production at RKO ===
Schary's Vanguard films were released through RKO, which offered him the job as head of the production. Although he still had eleven months left on his Vanguard contract they let him go and Schary signed a five-year deal with RKO in January 1947.

Schary personally produced Mr Blandings Builds His Dream House (1948), a big hit, and championed Crossfire (1947), a major success for the studio. Other hits its included Every Girl Should Be Married (1948), Station West (1949), The Set-Up (1949) and The Window (1949). He greenlit the directorial debuts of Nicholas Ray (They Live by Night (1948)) and Joseph Losey (The Boy with Green Hair (1948)), both of which lost money. Expensive money losers included Adventure in Baltimore (1949) with Shirley Temple.

RKO was taken over by Howard Hughes, who clashed with Schary, particularly over Schary's desire to make Battleground, a film about the Battle of the Bulge. Schary resigned in July 1948. He soon accepted a job offer from Louis B. Mayer at MGM.

=== Head of production at MGM ===
MGM struggled to adapt to the post-war filmmaking environment and, in 1947, recorded its first-ever end-of-year financial loss. The movie industry was faced with the threat of the Paramount Decree, rising labor costs, political turmoil, labor unrest, and the threat of television. MGM's parent company, Loews Incorporated in New York, decided that Schary might be able to turn the tide. Schary signed to be vice president in charge of production in July 1948. Schary and studio chief and founder Louis B. Mayer would soon be at odds over philosophy, with Mayer favoring splashy, wholesome entertainment and Schary leaning toward what Mayer derided as darker "message pictures". "Films must provoke thought in addition to entertainment", Schary once said. "They must educate and inform as they entertain."

Schary's career at MGM got off to a strong start when Battleground (1949) proved to be MGM's most profitable film of the year. A 1949 profile called him a "boy wonder... very probably the most important man in the movie industry." Schary also received acclaim for his personal productions, including The Next Voice You Hear... (1950), Go for Broke! (1951) and Westward the Women (1951). Schary co-wrote (with Charles Palmer) the 1950 book Case History of a Movie, which extensively covered, from initial conception to screening, the production of the film The Next Voice You Hear....

Mayer and Schary's differences came to a head with the production of The Red Badge of Courage (1951). Mayer presented an ultimatum to Nick Schenck, head of Loews, that Schary be fired. Schenck supported Schary and Mayer resigned. In July 1951 Schary took over complete control of production at MGM.

==== MGM after Mayer ====
Schary's personal productions started losing money: Washington Story (1952), Plymouth Adventure (1952), and Dream Wife (1953). However Take the High Ground! (1953) and Bad Day at Black Rock (1955) were moderately successful. Schary also wrote and produced the documentary film The Battle of Gettysburg (1955), getting two Oscar nominations for his work.

At MGM, Schary greenlighted such films as Blackboard Jungle (1955), The Teahouse of the August Moon and Don't Go Near the Water which all proved to be big successes at the box office.

==== Fired from MGM ====
In Schary's last year at MGM he personally produced three films, all of which lost money: The Swan (1956), The Last Hunt (1956) and Designing Woman (1957). MGM recorded a loss in 1956 leading to Loews firing him from his $200,000 annual contract and replacing him with Ben Thau. He was to remain as a consultant for MGM until 1968 at $100,000 a year. Contemporary newspaper reports and Schary later claimed he was fired because of his political activities, including his close association with the Democratic Party.

In 1956, his final year running MGM, he appeared on the show This Is Your Life. Host Ralph Edwards stated that there had never been a show where more stars appeared to honor a guest. However, MGM swimming star Esther Williams would later state in her 1999 autobiography The Million Dollar Mermaid that Schary was just as rude, cruel, and as imperious as Mayer had been. She noted that she thought it appropriate that Schary was fired on Thanksgiving, since he was a "turkey".

=== Return to Broadway and later films ===
Following his departure from MGM, Schary obtained the rights to the life of Franklin D. Roosevelt in April 1957. He wrote and produced the Broadway play Sunrise at Campobello (1958–59), about Roosevelt, starring Ralph Bellamy. The play won five Tony Awards and ran for 556 performances.

Schary returned to Hollywood when he wrote and produced the film Lonelyhearts (1958), starring Montgomery Clift and directed by Vincent J. Donehue.

Schary had another Broadway hit when he produced and directed (but did not write) the comedy A Majority of One (1959–60) by Leonard Spigelgass, starring Gertrude Berg and Cedric Hardwicke. Schary earned a Tony nomination for his direction and the show ran for 556 performances. (It was later filmed, without Schary's involvement.)

Less successful was The Highest Tree (1959), which Schary wrote, produced and directed (and featured Robert Redford in the cast) and Triple Play (1959), a collection of short plays, which he produced.

Schary wrote and produced the film version of Sunrise at Campobello, which was released by Warner Brothers, directed by Donehue, in 1960. He also had a brief uncredited role in the film as Chairman of the Connecticut Delegation.

On Broadway, Schary had another huge hit as producer and director with the Meredith Willson musical, The Unsinkable Molly Brown (1960) starring Tammy Grimes, which ran for 532 performances. MGM released a film version starring Debbie Reynolds in 1964.

Schary wrote, produced and directed The Devil's Advocate (1961), based on the novel by Morris West, which ran for 116 performances. He produced and directed Something About a Soldier (1962) by Ernest Kinoy and Love and Kisses (1963) by Anita Rowe Block both which had short runs. He also wrote a memoir, For Special Occasions (1962).

Schary made his directorial debut in movies with Act One (1963) based on the memoirs of Moss Hart; Schary also wrote and produced. It was a flop and marked both the beginning and the end of Schary's film directing career.

=== Later career ===
On Broadway Schary wrote, produced and directed One by One (1964), which ran for seven performances, and produced and directed the musical, The Zulu and the Zayda (1965) which went for 179. Schary also wrote two more produced Broadway plays, Brightower (1970) (one performance) and Herzl (1976) (8 performances), neither of which had long runs.

Schary wrote his memoirs, Heyday, which came out shortly before his death. In an interview, he said "I've always had an edge and the edge is that I'm a writer. No matter what happens I can write. And I'm tough. You had to be tough to outwit them, to wear them down. I've always been pretty lucky that way."

== Politics ==
Although Schary was one of the studio executives who formulated the 1947 Waldorf Statement, he became an outspoken opponent of the anticommunist investigations of the House Un-American Activities Committee. In 1948, he was honored by the Anti-Defamation League for "distinguished contributions toward the enrichment of America's democratic legacy," together with Charles E. Wilson, Eleanor Roosevelt, Barney Balaban, and Darryl Zanuck.

Schary served as National Chairman of the Anti-Defamation League of B'nai B'rith from 1963 until April 22, 1969, when Samuel Dalsimer was elected the new National Chairman. After Dalsimer died unexpectedly later that year on August 22, Schary was named acting National Chairman and served until May 1970, when Seymour Graubard was elected to replace him. Schary as National Chairman had condemned what he called the "Negro extremists" which he believed comprised part of the Civil Rights movement, and also the Student Nonviolent Coordinating Committee (SNNC), after it criticized Israel.

Schary was appointed by Mayor John Lindsay to the office of New York City Commissioner for Cultural Affairs.

== Personal life ==
Schary worked as a printer in his youth at Art Craft Press in Newark, New Jersey. He married Miriam Svet, a pianist and painter, on March 5, 1932. The couple had three children: the novelist and memoirist Jill Schary Robinson, psychoanalyst Dr. Joy Schary, and CLIO award-winning producer Jeb Schary. Miriam and Dore Schary had seven grandchildren and 13 great-grandchildren.

Dore Schary died in 1980, aged 74, and was interred in the Hebrew Cemetery (also known as the Monmouth Fields Jewish Cemetery), West Long Branch, New Jersey. Miriam Svet Schary died on October 2, 1986, aged 74, and was interred next to her husband in the Hebrew Cemetery.

== Legacy ==
To honor his memory, the Anti-Defamation League established the Dore Schary Awards in 1982 "to recognize outstanding student film and video productions addressing themes related to ADL's mission."

== In popular culture ==
- Schary's name is used for a rhyme at the very end of Stan Freberg Presents the United States of America Volume One: The Early Years, a satirical album from 1961: "That highly military / (script by Dore Schary) / Revolutionary War!"
- In the 1947 RKO film, The Bachelor and the Bobby-Soxer (which he produced), Schary appears driving Cary Grant to the airport at the end of the film. Grant calls him "Jebby".
- In the I Love Lucy episode "Don Juan is Shelved" (1955), Ricky Ricardo calls Schary's office from his Hollywood hotel room and later Lucy Ricardo unknowingly recruits Schary to play a "big Hollywood producer" to prevent Ricky from being released from his movie contract at MGM. Schary had agreed to play himself but cancelled on short notice and was played instead by Philip Ober, who at the time was the husband of cast member Vivian Vance.
- In the Patty Duke Show episode "The Actress", Patty tries to get discovered by sending Schary a fake newspaper review of her high school play. The actor playing Schary says "That's the oldest trick in the book, a fake review. But I like her initiative. Send someone over."
- In the one-act comedy "Adaptation", written by Elaine May, the lead character Phil Bensen names his son "Dore Schary Junior".
- Actor Josh Pais portrayed Schary in the 2015 film I Saw the Light
- Dore Schary appears as a character in the Broadway biography of Moss Hart, Act One, written by James Lapine and produced by Lincoln Center Theatre in 2014.

== Select filmography ==
=== As screenwriter ===
- Fury of the Jungle (1933) – screenwriter
- Fog (1933) – screenwriter
- He Couldn't Take It (1933) – screenwriter
- Let's Talk It Over (1934) – original story "Loves of a Sailor"
- The Most Precious Thing in Life (1934) – screenwriter
- Young and Beautiful (1934) – screenwriter
- Murder in the Clouds (1934) – screenwriter
- Red Hot Tires (1935) – additional dialogue
- Mississippi (1935) – contributing writer
- Racing Luck (1935) – additional dialogue
- Storm Over the Andes (1935) – screenwriter
- Chinatown Squad (1935) – screenwriter
- The Raven (1935) – screenwriter (uncredited)
- Silk Hat Kid (1935) – screenwriter
- Your Uncle Dudley (1935) – screenwriter
- Timothy's Quest (1936) – screenwriter
- Song and Dance Man (1936) – screenwriter
- Mind Your Own Business (1936) – screenwriter
- Her Master's Voice (1937)
- Outcast (1937) – screenwriter
- The Girl from Scotland Yard (1937) – screenwriter
- Big City (1937) – screenwriter
- Ladies in Distress (1938) – screenwriter
- Boys Town (1938) – screenwriter
- Broadway Melody of 1940 (1940) – original story
- Young Tom Edison (1940) – screenwriter
- Edison, the Man (1940) – screenwriter
- Behind the News (1940)
- Married Bachelor (1941) – screenwriter
- Here Comes Kelly (1943) – story
- It's a Big Country (1951) – story
- The Battle of Gettysburg (1955) (documentary short)

=== As head of MGM B unit ===
- Joe Smith American (1942)
- Kid Glove Killer (1942)
- Journey for Margaret (1942)
- Bataan (1943)
- Lassie Come Home (1943)

=== For David O. Selznick ===
- I'll Be Seeing You (1944)
- The Spiral Staircase (1945)
- Till the End of Time (1946)
- The Farmer's Daughter (1947)
- The Bachelor and the Bobby-Soxer (1947)

=== Films overseen while head of RKO ===
- Trail Street (Feb 1947)
- A Likely Story (Apr 1947)
- Banjo (May 1947)
- Honeymoon (May 1947)
- Born to Kill (May 1947)
- The Woman on the Beach (Jun 1947)
- Crossfire (Jul 1947) – presents
- The Bachelor and the Bobby Soxer (July 1947) – personally produced
- The Long Night (Aug 1947)
- Magic Town (Oct 1947)
- Out of the Past (Nov 1947)
- Mourning Becomes Electra (Nov 1947)
- So Well Remembered (Nov 1947)
- Tycoon (Dec 1947)
- Night Song (Jan 1948)
- If You Knew Susie (Feb 1948)
- The Miracle of the Bells (Mar 1948)
- I Remember Mama (Mar 1948) – presents
- Berlin Express (May 1948)
- Race Street (Jun 1948) – presents
- Mr Blandings Builds His Dream House (June 1948) – presents
- Fighting Father Dunne (Jun 1948)
- Return of the Badmen (Jul 1948)
- The Velvet Touch (Aug 1948)
- They Live By Night (filmed 1947 rel Aug 1948) – presents
- Bodyguard (Sep 1948)
- Rachel and the Stranger (Oct 1948) – presents
- Station West (Oct 1948) – presents
- Every Girl Should Be Married (Nov 1948) – presents
- Blood on the Moon (Nov 1948)
- The Boy with Green Hair (Dec 1948) – presents
- A Woman's Secret (Feb 1949) – presents
- The Clay Pigeon (Feb 1949)
- The Set-Up (Mar 1949)
- Adventure in Baltimore (Apr 1949) – personally produced, presents
- The Window (May 1949)
- Roughshod (Jun 1949)
- Follow Me Quietly (Jul 1949)
- Make Mine Laughs (Aug 1949)
- Bed of Roses (1948)
- Indian Summer (1949)
- Easy Living (filmed 1948 rel Oct 1949)
- Walk Softly, Stranger (filmed 1948, rel Oct 1950)

=== Personally produced while head of MGM ===
- Battleground (1949)
- The Next Voice You Hear... (1950)
- Go for Broke! (1951)
- Westward the Women (1951)
- Target for Scandal(1952)
- Plymouth Adventure (1952)
- The Hoaxsters (1953) – documentary
- Dream Wife (1953)
- Take the High Ground! (1953)
- Bad Day at Black Rock (1955)
- The Swan (1956)
- The Last Hunt (1956)
- Designing Woman (1956)

=== Films overseen while head of MGM ===
- The Great Caruso (1950)
- An American in Paris (1951)

=== Post MGM films ===
- Lonelyhearts (1958) – writer, producer
- Startime (1960) (TV series) – episode "What About You" – writer, producer
- Sunrise at Campobello (1960) – writer, producer
- Westinghouse Presents: The Sound of the Sixties (1961) (TV special) – producer
- Act One (1963) – writer, producer director (producer)

== Theatre credits ==
- Too Many Heroes (1937) – writer
- Sunrise at Campobello (1958) – writer, producer
- A Majority of One (1959) – producer, director
- Triple Play (1959) – producer
- The Highest Tree (1959) – writer, producer, director
- The Unsinkable Molly Brown (1960) – producer, director
- The Devil's Advocate (1961) – writer, producer, director
- Something About a Soldier (1962) – producer, director
- Love and Kisses (1963) – producer, director
- One by One (1964) – writer, producer, director
- The Zulue and the Zayda (1965) – producer, director
- Brightower (1970) – writer
- Herzl (1976) – writer, producer
