= The Farmer's Daughter (1947 film) =

1947 film by H. C. Potter

- theatrical release poster
- Directed by: H. C. Potter
- Written by: Allen Rivkin; Laura Kerr
- Based on: Juurakon Hulda (play) by Hella Wuolijoki
- Produced by: Dore Schary
- Starring: Loretta Young; Joseph Cotten; Ethel Barrymore; Charles Bickford
- Cinematography: Milton R. Krasner
- Edited by: Harry Marker
- Music by: Leigh Harline
- Production company: Vanguard Films
- Distributed by: RKO Radio Pictures
- Release dates: March 25, 1947 (Premiere-New York City); March 26, 1947 (U.S.)
- Running time: 97 minutes
- Language: English
- Box office: $3.3 million (US rentals)

The Farmer's Daughter is a 1947 American comedy film directed by H.C. Potter that tells the story of a farmgirl who ends up working as a maid for a U.S. congressman and his politically powerful mother. It stars Loretta Young, Joseph Cotten, Ethel Barrymore, and Charles Bickford, and was adapted by Allen Rivkin and Laura Kerr from the 1937 Finnish play Juurakon Hulda by Hella Wuolijoki, using the pen name Juhani Tervapää (misspelled in the film's credits as Juhni Tervataa).

The film won the Academy Award for Best Actress for Loretta Young and was nominated for Best Actor in a Supporting Role for Charles Bickford. Young's win was considered an upset; everyone had expected Rosalind Russell to win for her Lavinia in Mourning Becomes Electra.

In 1963, a television series based on the film was produced, starring Inger Stevens, Cathleen Nesbitt, and William Windom.

== Plot ==
Swedish-American Katie Holstrom leaves the family farm to attend nursing school in Capitol City. Barn painter Adolph Petree, who completed a job for Katie's father, offers her a ride, then steals her money along the way. Katie, refusing to ask her family for help, goes to work as a maid for political power broker Agatha Morley and her son, U.S. Representative Glenn Morley. She impresses Agatha and her loyal butler Joseph Clancy with her refreshing, down-to-earth common sense. Glenn is impressed with her other charms.

Unexpected problems arise when the Morleys and the other leaders of their political party have to select a replacement for a deceased congressman; they choose the unscrupulous Anders J. Finley. Knowing the man's true background, Katie strongly disapproves. At a public meeting to introduce Finley, Katie asks him pointed and embarrassing questions. Leaders of the opposition party are impressed and offer to back Katie in the coming election. Katie accepts and reluctantly quits her job, much to Glenn's disappointment.

When Katie's campaign gains support (with some coaching from Glenn), Finley smears her reputation by bribing Petree to claim Katie spent the night with him when he gave her a ride. Katie, distraught, runs home. When Glenn learns the truth, he follows her and proposes.

Agatha and Joseph get Finley drunk, and he reveals he is a member of an extreme nativist political group and that he bribed Petree, who is hidden away at his isolated lodge, to disparage Katie's reputation. Assisted by Katie's three burly brothers, Glenn retrieves Petree from his goon guards, then forces him to confess over the radio. Agatha withdraws her party's support for Finley and endorses Katie, ensuring her election. In the final scene, Glenn carries Katie across the threshold of the United States House of Representatives.

== Cast ==
- Loretta Young as Katie Holstrom
- Joseph Cotten as Glenn Morley
- Ethel Barrymore as Agatha Morley
- Charles Bickford as Joseph Clancy
- Rose Hobart as Virginia Thatcher
- Rhys Williams as Adolph Petree
- Harry Davenport as Dr. Matthew Sulven
- Tom Powers as Hy Nordick
- William Harrigan as Ward Hughes
- Lex Barker as Olaf Holstrom
- Harry Shannon as Mr. Holstrom
- Keith Andes as Sven Holstrom
- Thurston Hall as Wilbur Johnson
- Art Baker as Anders J. Finley
- Don Beddoe as Einar, campaign reporter
- James Arness as Peter Holstrom
- Anna Q. Nilsson as Mrs. Holstrom
- John Gallaudet as Van
- William B. Davidson as Eckers
- Cy Kendall as Sweeney
- Frank Ferguson as Martinaan
- William Bakewell as Windor
- Charles Lane as Jackson, campaign reporter

In addition, Gus Stavros appears as a background extra in the film.

== Production ==
Because of rumors that Joseph Cotten and Ingrid Bergman were having an affair, Bergman was replaced by Loretta Young.

== Reception ==
=== Critical response ===
On Rotten Tomatoes, The Farmer's Daughter currently holds an approval rating of 100% based on eight reviews, with an average rating of 7.10/10.

=== Awards and nominations ===
Award	Category	Nominee(s)	Result	Ref.
Academy Awards	Best Actress	Loretta Young	Won	
Academy Awards	Best Supporting Actor	Charles Bickford	Nominated	
