= Mind Your Own Business (film) =

1936 film by Norman Z. McLeod

- Theatrical release poster
- Directed by: Norman Z. McLeod
- Screenplay by: John Francis Larkin; Dore Schary
- Produced by: Emanuel Cohen
- Starring: Charlie Ruggles; Alice Brady; Lyle Talbot; Benny Baker; Gene Lockhart; Jack La Rue
- Cinematography: Robert Pittack
- Edited by: George McGuire
- Production company: Paramount Pictures
- Distributed by: Paramount Pictures
- Release date: December 18, 1936
- Running time: 75 minutes
- Country: United States
- Language: English

Mind Your Own Business is a 1936 American comedy film directed by Norman Z. McLeod and written by John Francis Larkin and Dore Schary. The film stars Charlie Ruggles, Alice Brady, Lyle Talbot, Benny Baker, Gene Lockhart, and Jack La Rue. It was released on December 18, 1936, by Paramount Pictures.

It features an early appearance from Jon Hall then acting under the name "Lloyd Crane".

== Cast ==
- Charlie Ruggles as Orville Shanks
- Alice Brady as Melba Shanks
- Lyle Talbot as Crane
- Benny Baker as Sparrow
- Gene Lockhart as Bottles
- Jack La Rue as Cruger
- Jon Hall as Scoutmaster Davis
- Frankie Darro as Bob
- William Demarest as Droopy
- Robert Baldwin as Jimmy Jeeper
- Nick Stewart as Butler
- Paul Harvey as Brannigan
- Theodore von Eltz as District Attorney Adams
- Duke York as Cruger's Henchman
- Charles C. Wilson as Detective
- David Sharpe as Tommy Finch

== Critical reception ==
In their March, 1937 edition, Modern Screen gave the film a two-star review and wrote, "If you like Charlie Ruggles' absentminded cut-ups, you will find this good entertainment. But we'd give you a gilt-edged guarantee that you won't have a dull moment watching this, anyhow. Alice Brady is the reason for such a seemingly rash statement. Giving good characterizations, when the opportunity occasionally presents itself, are Lyle Talbot, Frankie Darro, Benny Baker, Gene Lockhart and Jack LaRue. But characterization, and even plot, fade into unimportance alongside a combination like the Ruggles-Brady one. They're the whole picture."
