= Joe Smith, American =

1942 film by Richard Thorpe

- Theatrical Film Poster
- Directed by: Richard Thorpe
- Written by: Allen Rivkin
- Based on: The Adventures of Joe Smith, American; 1940 story in Hearst's International Cosmopolitan by Paul Gallico
- Produced by: Jack Chertok
- Starring: Robert Young; Marsha Hunt
- Cinematography: Charles Lawton Jr.
- Edited by: Elmo Veron
- Music by: Daniele Amfitheatrof (uncredited)
- Production company: Metro-Goldwyn-Mayer
- Distributed by: Lowes, Inc.
- Release date: February 1942
- Running time: 63 minutes
- Country: United States
- Language: English
- Budget: $236,000
- Box office: $708,000

Joe Smith, American is a 1942 American spy film directed by Richard Thorpe and stars Robert Young and Marsha Hunt. The film, loosely based on the story of Herman W. Lang, and the theft of plans of a top-secret bombsight, is the account of a worker at an aviation factory who is kidnapped by enemy spies. The opening credits contained the following written prologue: "This story is about a man who defended his country. His name is Joe Smith. He is an American. This picture is a tribute to all Joe Smiths."

Joe Smith, American was the first in a series of B films made at MGM under the supervision of Dore Schary who also wrote the initial treatment, based on "his own yarn". His story was later adapted to a postwar setting and new characters to become The Big Operator (1959).

== Plot ==
In 1942, Joe Smith is a "buck an hour" crew chief on the Lockheed P-38 Lightning assembly line in a Los Angeles defense plant. When plant president Mr. Edgerton and his supervisor Blake McKettrick call him into his office, Joe is grilled by two men from Washington, Freddie Dunhill and Gus, who later ask him to draw from memory a blueprint put in front of him. When Joe shows he can draw the plans accurately, Edgerton promotes him to head up a new project based on the top secret Norden bombsight.

Unable to tell his wife Mary and fourth-grade son Johnny or even his co-workers, about his new job, Joe is targeted by a group of men who want the secrets of the bombsight. While he leaves the plant late at night, his car is forced off the road and Joe is brought to a deserted house. The four men who have kidnapped him, blindfold Joe and beat him, trying to force him to draw the plans of the bombsight. Remembering that his son also had a secret he was keeping no matter what he and his wife asked, and that Johnny was studying about Nathan Hale, Joe refuses to cooperate and is beaten severely.

When the spies realize they have no option but to kill Joe, he is driven away but takes the opportunity to throw himself out of their car. An elderly couple come upon Joe lying in the street while the four kidnappers make their getaway. In recovery, even though he is blindfolded, he had sneaked some peeks at the men who held him and tried to memorize sounds in their car that would identify where he was. When the police take Joe on a reconstruction of his drive, he slowly puts together the route and takes them back to a house where three men are confronted. Each of them has some identifying feature, but the ringleader is missing.

Finally back home, Joe receives Gus, Freddie, Edgerton and McKettrick who are there to thank him for his bravery. When McKettrick shakes his hand, Joe recognizes the distinctive ring worn by the leader of the kidnappers. The police, who are also there, arrest McKettrick before he can escape. One month later, on Father's Day, Mary and Joe have a party with their friends from work and Johnny gives Joe his "secret" gift, a tie. When his friends call Joe a hero, he rebuffs them, saying that there are no heroes in America, just people, "who don't like being pushed around."

== Cast ==
- Robert Young as Joe Smith
- Marsha Hunt as Mary Smith
- Harvey Stephens as Freddie Dunhill
- Darryl Hickman as Johnny Smith
- Jonathan Hale as Blake McKettrick
- Noel Madison as Schricker
- Don Costello as Mead
- Joseph Anthony as Conway
- William Forrest as Gus
- Russell Hicks as Mr. Edgerton
- Mark Daniels as Pete
- William Tannen as Eddie

== Production ==
Although considered a war propaganda film, principal photography on Joe Smith, American took place from October 20 to November 11, 1941, prior to the attack on Pearl Harbor. The prewar arrest of a German factory worker who stole the plans of the Norden bombsight was the basis of the story, with stock photography of the Lockheed Aircraft company incorporated to provide a wartime look.

Contemporary sources list both Ava Gardner and John Raitt in the cast. Their appearances are uncredited in the film and likely they were extras.

During the film, Young's son recites the Pledge of Allegiance with his classmates and they do not say "under God" during the pledge since it was not in use at the time. They also saluted while they said the pledge with their arms outstretched instead of their hands over their hearts. Their hands were held vertically instead of horizontally like the Nazi salute.

== Reception ==
In his review Theodore Strauss wrote, in The New York Times,"In its own simple and unassuming way, Joe Smith, American, now at the Criterion, does more to underscore the deep and indelible reasons why this country is at war than most of the recent million-dollar epics with all their bravura patriotism. In this film there is no martial music, there are no displays of armed armadas and no one pins a medal on anybody's chest. Instead, the author and director have simply taken one commonplace American and shown, in one tense and sharply cut event when his country's safety was at stake, how it was the little things, the small remembrances of what his life had been, that pulled him through." Time Magazine also gave a positive review, "Joe Smith, American is the man Hollywood forgot while it was busy glamorizing World War 1 doughboys. An aircraft factory worker, he is one of the 14 to 20 civilians it takes to keep a modern fighting man in the field. His story is just the kind of propaganda the U.S. would like to have Hollywood make more of."

The New York Times film critic Bosley Crowther gave Joe Smith, American an "honorable mention" in his "Ten Best Films of the Year" list, and several consumer magazines praised the low-budget film for its excellence. According to an article in The Hollywood Reporter on October 27, 1942, Joe Smith, American was one of 10 films selected by the East and West Association to be sent for exhibition in Asian countries as, "most nearly representative of life in the U.S."

=== Box office ===
According to MGM records, Joe Smith, American made $487,000 in the US and Canada and $221,000 elsewhere, making a profit of $222,000.
