= My Dream Is Yours =

1949 film by Michael Curtiz

- Theatrical release poster
- Directed by: Michael Curtiz; Friz Freleng (animated sequence)
- Written by: Harry Kurnitz; Dane Lussier; Allen Rivkin (adaptation); Laura Kerr (adaptation); Jerry Wald (story) (uncredited); Paul Finder Moss (story) (uncredited)
- Produced by: Michael Curtiz; George Amy (associate producer)
- Starring: Jack Carson; Doris Day; Lee Bowman
- Cinematography: Wilfred M. Cline; Ernest Haller
- Edited by: Folmar Blangsted
- Music by: Harry Warren
- Distributed by: Warner Bros.
- Release date: April 16, 1949
- Running time: 101 minutes
- Country: United States
- Language: English
- Budget: $2 million or $2,087,000
- Box office: $1.7 million or $2,742,000

My Dream Is Yours is a 1949 American Technicolor musical romantic comedy film directed by Michael Curtiz and starring Jack Carson, Doris Day, Lee Bowman and Eve Arden. This was a loose remake of the 1934 Twenty Million Sweethearts, starring Dick Powell and Ginger Rogers.

== Plot ==
The film opens in Los Angeles, where Doug Blake is dumped as a manager by Gary Mitchell. He goes to New York City to find a new singer to replace Gary on the Hour of Enchantment radio show. While in New York, he discovers Martha Gibson turning records in a jukebox factory. He takes her to Los Angeles and tries to introduce her to Felix Hofer, a rich sponsor. His efforts lead to a series of communication failures. In addition, he learns that Martha is the widow of soldier who died during World War II and has a small son, Freddie.

Meanwhile, Martha has begun to fall in love with Gary. Doug takes her to a party at Gary's house where Gary gets drunk and is unable to sing on his radio program. Martha replaces him and becomes successful. Gary, whose ego has driven away all of the people who once helped him, cannot find anyone who will hire or even represent him. Knowing how Martha feels about Gary, Doug helps him come back, but Gary goes back to his old ways and drives Martha away. Martha then realizes that she really loves Doug and makes up with him.

== Cast ==
- Jack Carson as Doug Blake
- Doris Day as Martha Gibson
- Lee Bowman as Gary Mitchell
- Adolphe Menjou as Thomas Hutchins
- Eve Arden as Vivian Martin
- S. Z. Sakall as Felix Hofer
- Selena Royle as Freda Hofer
- Edgar Kennedy as Uncle Charlie
- Sheldon Leonard as Grimes
- Franklin Pangborn as Sourpuss Manager
- John Berkes as Character Actor
- Ada Leonard as Herself
- Frankie Carle as Himself
- Iris Adrian as Peggy (uncredited)
- Duncan Richardson as Freddie Gibson (uncredited)
- Mel Blanc as Bugs Bunny and Tweety (voice)

== Songs ==
The film features the following songs, mostly written by Ralph Blane and composed by Harry Warren:

- "My Dream Is Yours" with lyrics by Ralph Blane
- "Someone Like You" with lyrics by Ralph Blane
- "Love Finds a Way" with lyrics by Ralph Blane
- "Tic, Tic, Tic", with lyrics by Ralph Blane a song praising the virtue of Geiger counters and the similarities between love and radiation poisoning
- "(You May Not Be an Angel, but) I'll String Along With You"with lyrics by Al Dubin
- "Freddie, Get Ready" with lyrics by Ralph Blane and Mel Blanc, the last chorus uses the tune of Hungarian Rhapsody No. 2.
- "I'll String Along with You" with lyrics by Al Dubin
- "You Must Have Been a Beautiful Baby with lyrics by Johnny Mercer"
- "With Plenty of Money and You" with lyrics by Al Dubin
- "Nagasaki" with lyrics by Mort Dixon, a 1928 song rather than a link between the Atomic bombings of Hiroshima and Nagasaki and the radioactive ode "Tic, Tic, Tic" earlier in the film
- "Canadian Capers (Cuttin' Capers)" with lyrics by Blane and Warren, music by Henry Cohen, Gus Chandler, and Bert White

"Someone like You” has been subsequently recorded by Ella Fitzgerald in 1949 and Peggy Lee.

== Production ==
The film serves as a remake of Twenty Million Sweethearts (1934), in which the aspiring singer was male. The film Swing Hostess (1944) also had a similar plot, in which aspiring singer Judy Alvin (Martha Tilton) is spinning records in a jukebox factory, and her roommate and friend Marge (Iris Adrian) tries to help her start her career.

Eve Arden has a key supporting role as Vivian "Vi" Martin, Doug Blake's co-worker in the radio show The Hour of Enchantment. She is depicted as a highly competent professional woman. She at first agrees to financially support Doug in exchange for half his business earnings. She then allows Martha and her son Freddie to move in with her. When more is needed to finance Martha's career, Vivian has to sell her own mink coat.

The film features a love triangle among Doug Blake, Martha Gibson, and Gary Mitchell. Vivian Martin has her own romantic subplot with Thomas Hutchins, though it is limited to a few suggestive glances. This was the third and last time that Arden co-worked with Adolphe Menjou.

According to gossip columnist Sheilah Graham, Day missed three days of shooting in May 1948, due to being sick with a fever.

The film features the final feature film appearance of comic actor Edgar Kennedy, who died on November 9, 1948.

The film is perhaps best remembered today for an extended dream sequence combining animation and live action which featured a cameo appearance by Bugs Bunny, dancing with Jack Carson and Doris Day to the tune of Hungarian Rhapsody No. 2, as well as an appearance by Tweety, which was a favorite of animation director Friz Freleng. The sequence has an Easter theme and features the actors in bunny suits.

== Reception ==
=== Box office ===
According to Warner Bros records the film earned $1,994,000 domestically and $748,000 foreign.

=== Critical ===
Time magazine's review was not favorable, finding that the film merely reused elements from older films. "It has all been done before—frequently much better". It did, however, find some positive aspects of the film. One was Doris Day's singing, another the caustic lines of Eve Arden. John L. Scot, reviewer for the Los Angeles Times, found the basic story trite. But also praised the charm of Doris Day and her ability to sell a tune, while also favoring the comedy performance of Eve Arden. Richard L. Coe, reviewer of The Washington Post, called the film a "supremely dull achievement". He found Arden's character wittier and more human than that of Doris Day.

The New York Times wrote, "The only bit of novelty in this hackneyed reworking of this how-tough-it-is-to-get-a-break-in-show-business theme is the introduction of a cartoon fantasy sequence representing a child's dream of the Easter bunny....it doesn't last long enough to divert attention from the sad fact that 'My Dream is Yours' is a dull show."

Tom Santopietro, in a retrospective of the film, credits Arden with the best performance of the film, praising her comic timing.

Martin Scorsese discussed the film in his documentary A Personal Journey with Martin Scorsese Through American Movies, and noted its influence on his 1977 film New York, New York.

== Sources ==
- Hemming, Roy (1999), "Harry Warren", The Melody Lingers on: The Great Songwriters and Their Movie Musicals, Newmarket Press, ISBN 978-1557043801
- Tucker, David C. (2012), "My Dream Is Yours (1949)", Eve Arden: A Chronicle of All Film, Television, Radio and Stage Performances, McFarland & Company, ISBN 978-0786488100
