= Fog (1933 film) =

1933 film directed by Albert S. Rogell

- Directed by: Albert S. Rogell
- Written by: Ethel Hill; Dore Schary
- Produced by: Harry Cohn; Robert North; Sid Rogell
- Starring: Mary Brian; Donald Cook; Reginald Denny
- Cinematography: Benjamin H. Kline
- Edited by: Richard Cahoon
- Production company: Columbia Pictures
- Distributed by: Columbia Pictures
- Release date: November 11, 1933
- Running time: 70 minutes
- Country: United States
- Language: English

Fog is a 1933 American pre-Code thriller film directed by Albert S. Rogell and starring Mary Brian, Donald Cook and Reginald Denny. It was produced and distributed by Hollywood studio Columbia Pictures. The Library of Congress holds a print of the film.

== Plot ==
A series of murders take place on a fog-bound cruise liner sailing across the Atlantic Ocean.

== Cast ==
- Mary Brian as Mary Fulton
- Donald Cook as Wentworth Brown
- Reginald Denny as Dr. Winstay
- Robert McWade as Alonzo Holt
- Helen Freeman as Madame Alva
- Maude Eburne as Mrs. Jackson
- G. Pat Collins as Mullaney
- Edwin Maxwell as Ship Captain
- Samuel S. Hinds as Dickens
- Marjorie Gateson as

uncredited

- Eddie Fetherston as Ship Passenger
- Merrill McCormick as Ship Officer
- C. Montague Shaw as Ship Officer

== Bibliography ==
- Fetrow, Alan G. . Sound films, 1927-1939: a United States Filmography. McFarland, 1992.
