= Aladdin and His Lamp =

1952 film by Lew Landers

- Directed by: Lew Landers
- Written by: Howard Dimsdale; Millard Kaufman
- Produced by: Walter Wanger
- Starring: Johnny Sands; Patricia Medina; Richard Erdman
- Cinematography: Gilbert Warrenton
- Edited by: Jack Ogilvie
- Music by: Marlin Skiles
- Production company: Walter Wanger Productions
- Distributed by: Monogram Pictures
- Release date: February 24, 1952
- Running time: 67 minutes
- Country: United States
- Language: English

Aladdin and His Lamp is a 1952 American fantasy adventure film directed by Lew Landers and starring Johnny Sands, Patricia Medina and Richard Erdman. It was shot in Cinecolor and produced by Walter Wanger for distribution by Monogram Pictures.

== Plot ==
A poor young man finds a lamp with a genie trapped inside. The genie promises to grant the man three wishes if he frees him from the lamp.

== Cast ==
- Johnny Sands as Aladdin
- Patricia Medina as Princess Jasmine
- Richard Erdman as Mirza
- John Dehner as Prince Bokra
- Billy House as Kafan
- Nedrick Young as Hassan
- Noreen Nash as Passion Flower
- Rick Vallin as Captain of the Guard
- Charles Horvath as Genie
- Sujata Rubener as Dancing Slave
- Joe McGuinn as Mahmud
- Mady Comfort as Quasi
- John Bleifer as Billah
- Frederic Berest as Taji
- Arabella as Maid-in-Waiting
- Suzan Ball as Dancing Girl
- Joan Barton as Harem Girl
- Joanne Jordan as Harem Girl
- Carol Varga as Dancing Girl
- Sue Casey as Dancing Girl
- Dorothy Johnson as Dancing Girl
- Judy Landon as Dancing Girl
- Mona Knox as Dancing Girl

== Production ==
Filming began on August 1, 1951.

The film's sets were designed by the art director Dave Milton.
