= Johnny Sands =

American actor

- Sands in The Admiral Was a Lady, 1950
- Born: Elbert Harp Jr. April 29, 1928; Lorenzo, Texas, U.S.
- Died: December 30, 2003 (aged 75); Ainaloa, Hawaii, U.S.
- Occupations: Actor, real estate agent
- Years active: 1946–1971 as actor, 1971-1991 as real estate agent
- Spouses: Sue Allen (m. 1947; div. 1947) Donella B. Clementini (m. 1962)

Johnny Sands (born Elbert Harp Jr., April 29, 1928 – December 30, 2003) was an American film and television actor. He worked in over a dozen films, and on television, before he retired from show business in 1971. He then worked as a real estate agent in Hawaii, until retiring in 1991.

== Early years ==
Sands was born in Lorenzo, Texas. When he was 13, he went to Hollywood to work as an usher in a theater.

== Career ==
Discovered by a talent scout on his way to the beach, he chose his professional name for his love of sand and surf.

Sands' screen debut was in Affairs of Geraldine (1946). He is perhaps best remembered for his role in The Bachelor and the Bobby-Soxer (1947), with Shirley Temple, Cary Grant and Myrna Loy, as Shirley Temple's boyfriend, Jerry White; as well as the title character in Aladdin and His Lamp (1952).

He also appeared in The Stranger (1946), with Orson Welles, Loretta Young, and Edward G. Robinson; and, Till the End of Time (1946), with Guy Madison, Robert Mitchum and Dorothy McGuire.

A popular actor who worked in over a dozen films, as well as television shows such as Perry Mason, with Raymond Burr, he continued to receive fan mail for the rest of his life.

Sands eventually left acting and moved to Hawaii, launching a career in real estate.

== Personal life ==
Sands was married twice, first to Sue Allen in 1947, but it lasted only one year Daughter Catherine Browning from a previous marriage. Two sons, Michael and Marco with Donella..

== Death ==
Sands died on December 30, 2003, at his home in Ainaloa, Hawaii.

== Filmography ==
Year	Title	Role	Notes
1946	The Stranger	Jogging Student in Woods	Film debut, Uncredited
1946	Till the End of Time	Tommy	
1946	Affairs of Geraldine	Danny	
1947	Born to Speed	Johnny Randall	
1947	Blaze of Noon	Keith McDonald	
1947	The Bachelor and the Bobby-Soxer	Jerry White	
1947	The Fabulous Texan	Bud Clayton	
1949	Adventure in Baltimore	Gene Sheldon	
1949	Massacre River	Randy Reid	
1949	It's Your Health	Jim Davis	Short
1950	The Lawless	Joe Ferguson	
1950	The Admiral Was a Lady	Eddie Hoff	
1950	Two Flags West	Lt. Adams	
1951	Target Unknown	Sgt. Frank Crawford	
1951	The Basketball Fix	Jed Black	
1952	Aladdin and His Lamp	Aladdin	
1953	Jungle Drums of Africa	Bert Hadley	Serial
1953	Sabre Jet	Sgt. Cosgrove	Final film
