= The Bachelor and the Bobby-Soxer =

1947 film by Dore Schary and Irving Reis

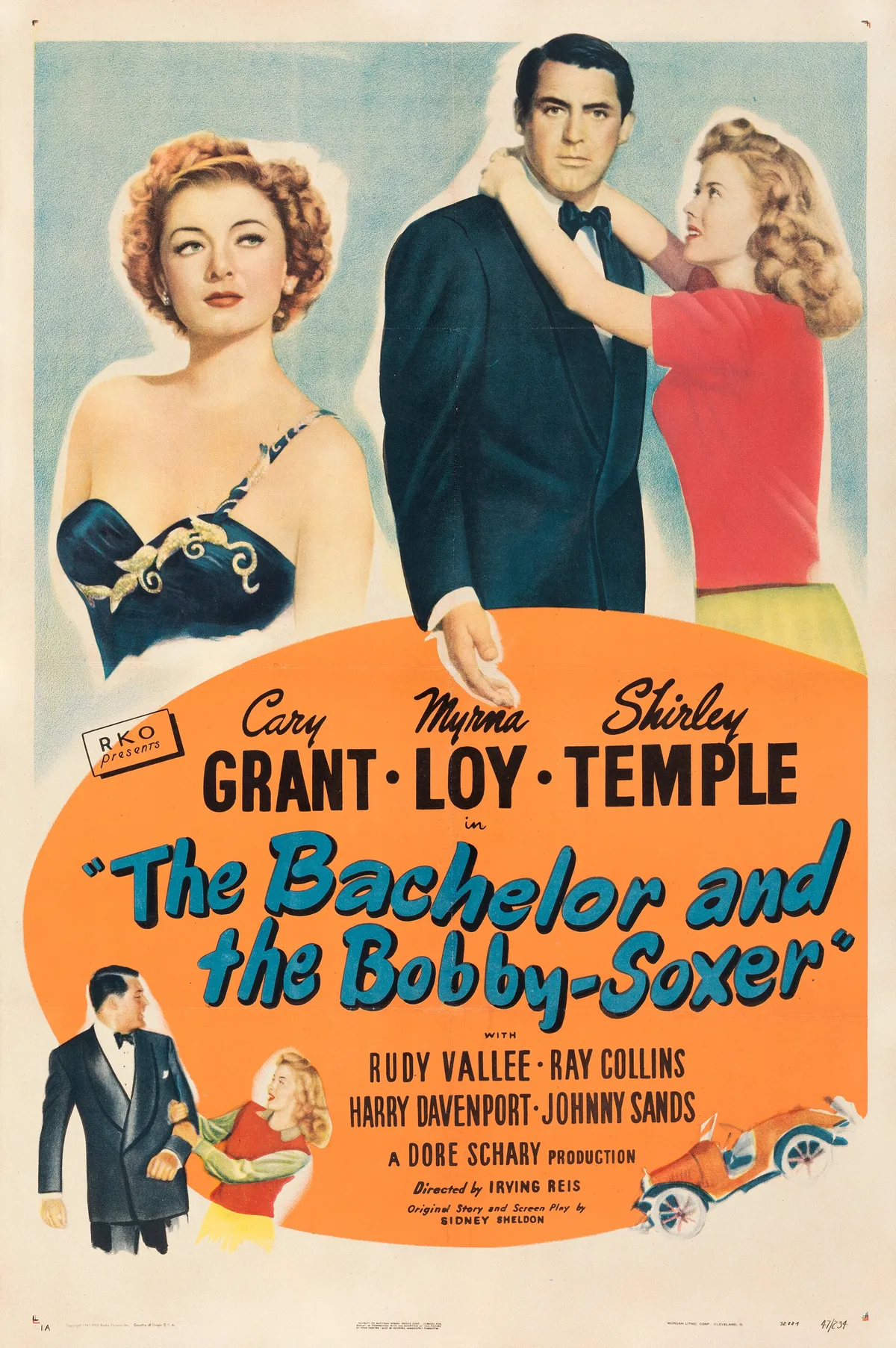
- Theatrical release poster
- Directed by: Irving Reis
- Written by: Sidney Sheldon
- Produced by: Dore Schary
- Starring: Cary Grant; Myrna Loy; Shirley Temple; Rudy Vallée; Ray Collins; Harry Davenport; Johnny Sands
- Cinematography: Robert De Grasse; Nicholas Musuraca
- Edited by: Frederic Knudtson
- Music by: Leigh Harline
- Production company: Vanguard Films
- Distributed by: RKO Radio Pictures
- Release dates: July 24, 1947 (New York City); September 1, 1947 (United States)
- Running time: 95 minutes
- Country: United States
- Language: English
- Budget: $1,961,000
- Box office: $5,550,000 (worldwide rentals)

The Bachelor and the Bobby-Soxer (released as Bachelor Knight in the United Kingdom) is a 1947 American screwball romantic comedy film directed by Irving Reis and written by Sidney Sheldon. The film stars Cary Grant, Myrna Loy and Shirley Temple in a story about a teenager’s crush on an older man.

Upon release, The Bachelor and the Bobby-Soxer was received positively by audiences and critics. Sheldon won an Academy Award for Best Original Screenplay for the script.

== Plot ==
Margaret and Susan Turner are sisters who live together. Susan, the titular bobby-soxer, is an intelligent 17-year-old high school student with a habit of forming short-lived enthusiasms after hearing the regular guest lectures at school. Margaret, a judge, is Susan's guardian. Richard Nugent, a handsome and sophisticated artist, is a defendant in Margaret's courtroom, charged by assistant district attorney Tommy Chamberlain with starting a nightclub brawl. Margaret releases him with a warning when it becomes clear that the fight was started by two women, Agnes Prescott and Florence, fighting over him.

Richard proceeds to Susan's school, where he is the guest lecturer for the day. Listening to his speech, Susan becomes infatuated with him. After the talk, she insists on interviewing him for the school paper and suggests that she model for one of his paintings. That evening, she dons a sophisticated outfit and sneaks away from home and into his apartment while he is out.

Soon after Richard returns and discovers Susan in his apartment, Margaret and Tommy arrive frantically knocking on the door. Richard assaults Tommy and is held in jail until Matt Beemish, the court psychiatrist and also Margaret and Susan's uncle, intervenes and explains the situation. He recommends allowing Susan to date the 35-year-old Richard until the infatuation dissipates and Tommy promises to drop the assault charge if Richard complies.

At a high school basketball game, Richard unsuccessfully tries to boost Susan's image of her ex-boyfriend Jerry White. At a neighborhood picnic, Susan persuades Richard to enter a series of novelty races but he loses repeatedly to Tommy. In the main event, an obstacle course, Susan asks Jerry to help Richard win. Because he still loves her, Jerry complies, bribing his friends to sabotage the other competitors and colliding with Tommy so that Richard wins the event.

Richard and Margaret are attracted to each other but Tommy considers Richard a habitual troublemaker and wants Margaret for himself. Hoping that Richard will stop seeing Margaret if he no longer must date Susan, Tommy announces that he is dropping the charge. When Margaret invites Richard out to a nightclub, they are continuously interrupted. Susan dramatically accuses Margaret of stealing her boyfriend. Uncle Matt takes Susan in hand and makes her realize that she is only infatuated with Richard and he is too old for her, so she returns to Jerry, who is being drafted into uniform.

Matt learns that Richard is planning a trip away, so he convinces Margaret she also needs a break and books her on the same flight. Hearing that Tommy is coming to arrest Richard on exaggerated charges, Matt stalls Tommy by telling the police at the airport that Tommy is a mental patient with delusions of being an assistant district attorney. Richard and Margaret are happily surprised to meet each other as they approach the plane to board and head off together.

== Cast ==
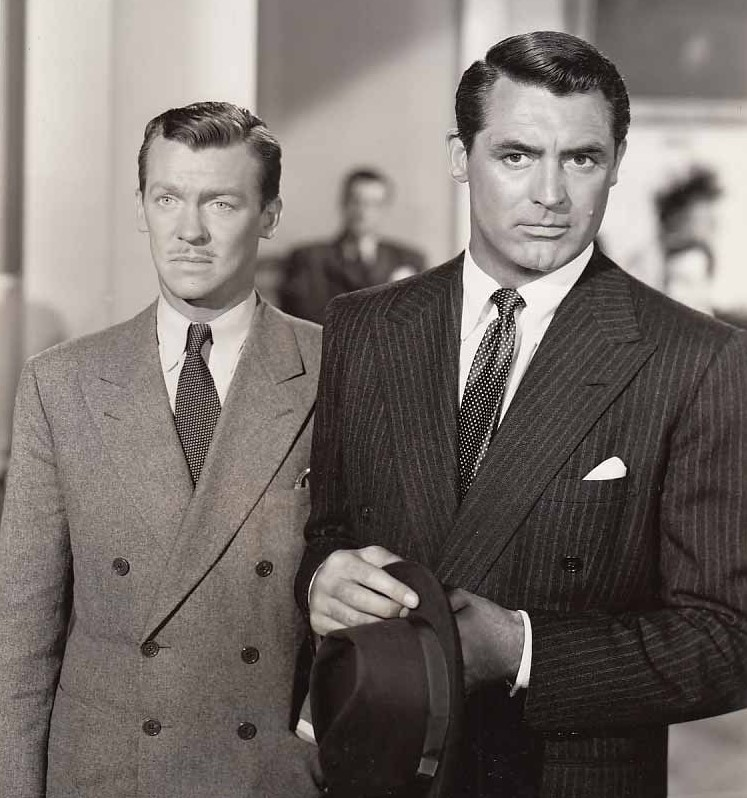
Tobin and Grant in a scene from The Bachelor and the Bobby-Soxer

- Cary Grant as Richard Nugent, a sophisticated bachelor
- Myrna Loy as Margaret Turner, a judge
- Shirley Temple as Susan Turner, her teenage sister
- Rudy Vallée as Tommy Chamberlain, an assistant district attorney
- Ray Collins as Dr. Matt Beemish, a psychiatrist and Margaret and Susan's uncle
- Harry Davenport as Judge Thaddeus Turner, Margaret and Susan's great uncle
- Johnny Sands as Jerry White, Susan's teenage boyfriend
- Don Beddoe as Joey
- Lillian Randolph as Bessie
- Veda Ann Borg as Agnes Prescott
- Dan Tobin as Walters
- Ransom M. Sherman as Judge Treadwell
- William Bakewell as Winters
- Irving Bacon as Melvin
- Ian Bernard as Perry
- Carol Hughes as Florence
- William Hall as Anthony Herman
- Gregory Gaye as Maître d'
- Pat Flaherty as Coach

== Reception ==
The Bachelor and the Bobby-Soxer premiered at Radio City Music Hall. In a contemporary review for The New York Times, critic Bosley Crowther called the film "most agreeable" and praised the four principal performers, the direction and screenplay. At the 20th Academy Awards, the film's screenplay won an Academy Award for Best Original Screenplay for Sidney Sheldon, who later created the television shows I Dream of Jeannie and Hart to Hart and wrote novels such as Master of the Game (1982), The Other Side of Midnight (1973) and Rage of Angels (1980). According to RKO records, the film earned $4,200,000 in theater rentals in the United States and Canada and $1,350,000 elsewhere, resulting in a profit of $700,000.

== Radio adaptation ==
The script was dramatized as a half-hour radio play on the May 10, 1948 broadcast of The Screen Guild Theater with Cary Grant, Myrna Loy and Shirley Temple. It was also dramatized as a Lux Radio Theater adaptation starring Grant and Temple that aired on June 13, 1949.

== Home media ==
In 2009, the film was available on videocassette and DVD.

== See also ==
- Shirley Temple filmography
