= Till the End of Time (film) =

1946 film by Edward Dmytryk

- Theatrical poster
- Directed by: Edward Dmytryk
- Screenplay by: Allen Rivkin
- Based on: They Dream of Home; 1944 novel by Niven Busch
- Produced by: Dore Schary
- Starring: Dorothy McGuire; Guy Madison; Robert Mitchum; Bill Williams
- Cinematography: Harry J. Wild
- Edited by: Harry Gerstad
- Music by: Leigh Harline
- Production company: RKO Radio Pictures
- Distributed by: RKO Radio Pictures
- Release date: July 23, 1946 (US)
- Running time: 105 minutes
- Country: United States
- Language: English

Till the End of Time is a 1946 American drama film directed by Edward Dmytryk and starring Dorothy McGuire, Guy Madison, Robert Mitchum, and Bill Williams. Released the same year but preceding the better known The Best Years of Our Lives, it covers much the same topic: the adjustment of World War II veterans to post-war civilian life. It was based on the novel They Dream of Home by Niven Busch (whose wife Teresa Wright appeared in The Best Years of Our Lives); unlike the soldier, sailor and airman of that film, the male leads in Till the End of Time are all U.S. Marines.

Frédéric Chopin's Polonaise Op. 53 is played throughout the film; it was given lyrics and adapted by Buddy Kaye and Ted Mossman and became a major hit for Perry Como at the time spending 10 weeks at number one on the Billboard popular music charts.

== Plot ==
Right after VJ Day, two decorated Marine Corps buddies, Cpl. William "Bill" Tabeshaw and Pfc. Cliff Harper, are among a group being immediately discharged in San Diego. Bill, a former cowboy, was wounded in Iwo Jima and has a silver plate implanted in his head. Former college student Cliff, is physically uninjured but harbors a deep resentment about losing nearly four years of his life because he enlisted right after Pearl Harbor.

Arriving in Los Angeles, Cliff finds that his parents are not home but meets his new neighbor, Helen Ingersoll, a vivacious 18-year-old who is instantly infatuated with him. Anxious to see old friends, he heads for Scuffy's, his favorite ice cream shop, only to find that it has become a bar. He finds his friend Pinky, a naval aviator, who introduces him to Pat Ruscomb. Immediately attracted to each other, they abandon Pinky and go to Pat's apartment. After they kiss, Pat assures him that this isn't love, but a by-product of the war, then reveals that she is a war widow who has never gotten over her husband's death 14 months earlier. Discouraged, Cliff returns home to be reunited with his ecstatic parents, C.W. and Amy. Cliff tries to talk about his experiences, but his mother immediately shuts him down. The more his parents insist that things should be just like they were before the war, the more edgy Cliff becomes. He tries to call Pat, who does not answer the phone, and goes to bed. He feigns sleep when his parents look in on him and his mother tries to tuck him in, then pulls off the sheet and cries himself to sleep.

The next day, Pinky invites Cliff to go to ice skating with him and Pat, who he calls his date. Unsure about their relationship, Cliff brings along Helen as his date. In the coffee shop with Pat, Cliff comforts a soldier having "the shakes", while Pat encourages him to go home and tell his family of his condition.

Under pressure from his father to decide his future, Cliff tells him that he isn't making any decisions. At breakfast Cliff tries to relate to his mother the misery of living in a foxhole, but she shuts him down, telling him to "stop living in the past". Bill stops by to brag that he has won $2,100 (equivalent to $35,000 in 2025) gambling and intends to buy a small cattle ranch in New Mexico. While Cliff easily discusses girls, gambling and drinking with him, his mother sits in silent disapproval and makes it clear she hopes not to see Bill again.

Bill and Cliff visit a fellow Marine Sgt. Perry Kincheloe, a legless double amputee who was in the hospital with Bill, now living at home with his mother. Perry, once a boxer, is grooming his younger brother to become the fighter he can no longer be and rejects any encouragement to use his artificial legs.

At Scuffy's, Bill notes that Perry, after progressing in the hospital with other Marines, has given in to discouragement and self-pity on his own. Cliff points out that during the war everyone was part of a team, and Bill responds that in civilian life, with no one to tell them what to do, they're on their own. Cliff spots Pat at the bar, where she is waiting for an Army Air Forces captain. Unhappy and jealous, Cliff comes home late and argues with his parents, who are upset that he is always out and accuse him of wasting time with a "boy" like Bill Tabeshaw, rather than following the plans they have for his future. Complaining that "it's just not like old times," Cliff is unable to make them understand that Bill is a combat mate, not a "boy", and that "old times" were gone over three years ago.

Cliff waits outside Pat's apartment for her to return, where he sees her impulsively kiss the captain goodnight. When she attempts to be flippant, he calls her a tramp and leaves her to a sleepless night. The next morning Cliff apologizes, explaining that he had begun to think of her as his girl. Pat breaks down and reveals that she married her husband knowing that what he needed "a dream of home" to get through the war, but that by its end his return had become hers. Her date was her late husband's co-pilot, and she kissed him because for an instant he became her husband. Cliff admits that he too is lonely and confused. At Pat's suggestion, Cliff takes a job at the electronics factory where she works, but on his first day tries to pick a fight with his foreman when he points out a mistake. Talking it over with Pat, Cliff proposes to her, but she rejects him when he says he wants only to live carefree on the beach until his money is gone.

A truculent Bill shows up at Cliff's house after losing his stake in Las Vegas. The plate in his head is causing him severe headaches, but he flatly refuses to go to the veteran's hospital. They go out drinking and Cliff telephones Perry, asking for his help to get Bill to a doctor. Perry finally dons his artificial legs and joins them, but before they can persuade Bill, they are approached by a group of men who invite them to join their veterans' organization. When Bill is told that the organization is restricted, excluding "Catholics, Jews, and Negroes", he spits in the face of one of them. During the ensuing mêlée, Perry discovers that he can still throw a punch, but Bill is hit over the head with a beer bottle, seriously injuring him.

At the hospital, Bill is prepped for surgery, and tells Cliff that if he pulls through, he will go back home and work and save to buy a ranch. While they wait, Cliff tells his father that despite the difficulties of readjusting to civilian life, in many ways he feels luckier than Bill and Perry; he has a job that he likes, though he's not sure he wants to make it a career, and he has Pat, who he wants to marry. C.W. accepts his modest ambitions, telling him "You didn't make yourself a soldier overnight, you can't become a civilian overnight." In the morning, having learned that Bill will be all right, they leave and meet Cliff's mother, who has brought Pat with her. Cliff and Pat run toward each other and happily embrace.

== Cast ==
- Dorothy McGuire as Pat Ruscomb
- Guy Madison as Cliff Harper
- Robert Mitchum as William Tabeshaw
- Bill Williams as Perry Kincheloe
- Tom Tully as C.W. Harper
- William Gargan as Gunnery Sgt. Watrous aka “Gunny”
- Jean Porter as Helen Ingersoll
- Johnny Sands as Tommy
- Loren Tindell as Pinky
- Ruth Nelson as Amy Harper
- Selena Royle as Mrs. Kincheloe
- Harry Von Zell as Scuffy
- Richard Benedict as the boy from Idaho

== Reception ==
The film made a profit of $490,000.
