= Laura Kerr =

American screenwriter

- Born: Laura Hornickel; October 21, 1902; Dillonvale, Ohio, USA
- Died: May 5, 1991 (aged 88); Woodland Hills, California, USA
- Education: Vassar College
- Occupation(s): Literary agent, screenwriter
- Spouse(s): Allen Rivkin; Anthony Veiller (div.)

Laura Kerr (born Laura Hornickel; October 21, 1902 – May 5, 1991) was an American literary agent and screenwriter. She and her second husband, Allen Rivkin, wrote several screenplays together in the 1940s and 1950s.

== Biography ==
Born to George Hornickel and Cara Kerr in Dillonvale, Ohio, in 1902, Laura was an only child. She attended Vassar College and entered a career as a literary agent. All the while, she wrote original plays.

After her first marriage to writer-producer Anthony Veiller (with whom she had a daughter) came to an end, she began writing screenplays. In 1947, she won both the Photoplay Award and the Look Magazine Award for her work.

She and her second husband, Allen Rivkin, wrote a number of scripts together, as well as a book about the film industry called Hello, Hollywood!

She died on May 1, 1991, in Woodland Hills, California, after suffering a stroke.

== Selected filmography ==
- Battle Circus (1953)
- Grounds for Marriage (1951)
- My Dream Is Yours (1949)
- The Farmer's Daughter (1947)
- Brazil (1944)
