= Wilbur Theatre =

Performing arts venue in Boston, Massachusetts

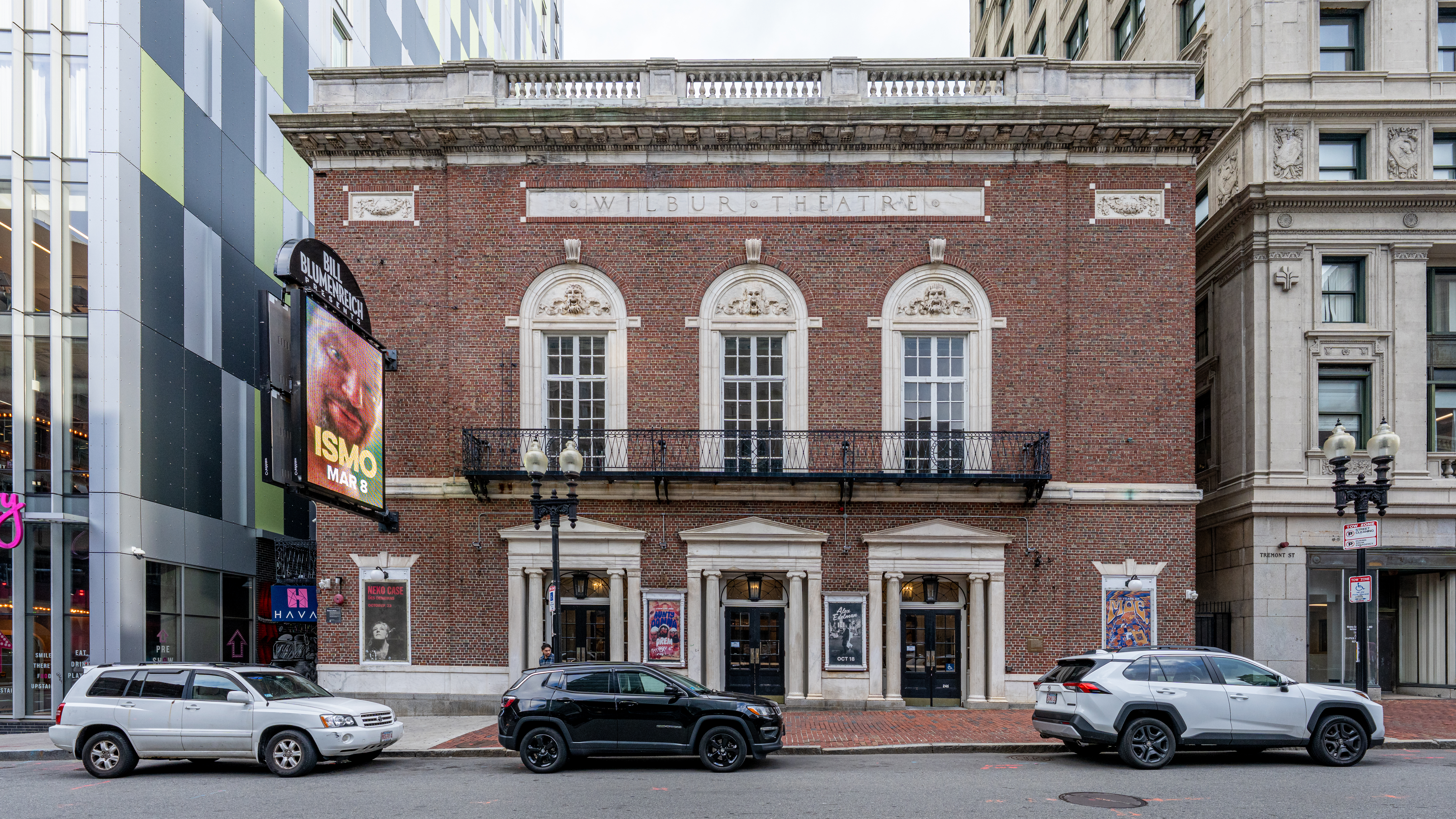
- The Wilbur, 2025
- Interactive map of Wilbur Theatre
- Address: 244–250 Tremont Street; Boston, Massachusetts; United States
- Capacity: 1,093, (1,200 General Admission)
- Current use: Comedy and music venue

Construction
- Opened: 1913
- Architects: Blackall, Clarence H.; Haynes Construction Co.

Tenant
- Bill Blumenreich

Website
- www.thewilbur.com
- Wilbur Theatre
- U.S. National Register of Historic Places
- Boston Landmark
- Coordinates: 42°21′2″N 71°3′56″W
- Architectural style: Colonial Revival
- MPS: Boston Theatre MRA
- NRHP reference No.: 80000443

Significant dates
- Added to NRHP: December 9, 1980
- Designated BOSL: July 14, 1987

The Wilbur Theatre is a historic performing arts theater at 244–250 Tremont Street in Boston, Massachusetts. The Wilbur Theatre originally opened in 1914, but underwent renovations in 2008. The Wilbur Theatre sits in the heart of Boston's historic theater district and is known for hosting live comedy and music.

The venue seats 1,093, but the main floor (orchestra level) has removable tables and seating, to create a general admission standing room (bringing capacity to 1,200). It features basic concessions, including a full bar, on each of the three floors (Orchestra, Mezzanine, Balcony).

== History ==
Clarence Blackall built the theater in 1913, and it was opened the following year. The play Love and Kisses was given its premiere at the theater in 1963. The Wilbur was listed on the National Register of Historic Places in 1980 and designated as a Boston Landmark by the Boston Landmarks Commission in 1987.

In 1998 SFX Entertainment (now Live Nation) bought the Boston theater properties of Jon B. Platt, which included the lease on the Wilbur. The lease ended in 2006.

In 2007 the theater was put on the market. Bill Blumenreich, a former owner of the Comedy Connection in Quincy Market, leased the building in 2008. The theater continues to regularly host comedic and musical acts, as well as other events.

== Comedy specials ==
The following specials were filmed at the Wilbur Theatre:

Comic	Special title	Network	Release date
Sam Morril	You've Changed	Amazon Prime	July 9, 2024
Sarah Silverman	Sarah Silverman: Someone You Love	HBO	May 27, 2023
Taylor Tomlinson	Look At You	Netflix	March 8, 2022
Jim Jefferies	Intolerant	Netflix	June 24, 2020
Katya Zamolodchikova	Katya: Help Me I'm Dying	Amazon Prime	December 12, 2019
Joe Rogan	Strange Times	Netflix	October 2, 2018
Norm Macdonald	Hitler's Dog, Gossip, and Trickery	Netflix	May 9. 2017
Dana Carvey	Straight White Male, 60	Netflix	November 4, 2016
Tig Notaro	Boyish Girl Interrupted	HBO	August 22, 2015
Jim Jefferies	BARE	Netflix	August 29, 2014
Jim Gaffigan	Obsessed	Comedy Central	April 27, 2014
Tom Green	Tom Green Live	Showtime	2012
Gary Gulman	In This Economy?	Comedy Central	September 1, 2012
Kathy Griffin	Gurrl Down	Bravo!	June 22, 2011
Bruce Bruce	Losin' It	Showtime	February 26, 2011
David Cross	Bigger & Blackerer	Sub Pop Records	May 25, 2010
Craig Ferguson	A Wee Bit o' Revolution	Comedy Central	March 22, 2009

== See also ==
- National Register of Historic Places listings in northern Boston, Massachusetts

== Images ==
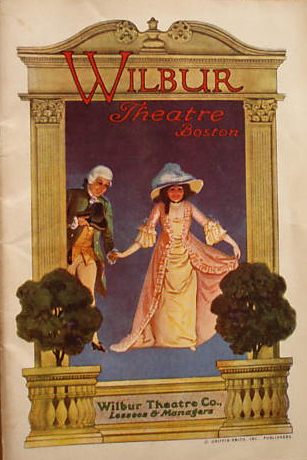
Program, 1915

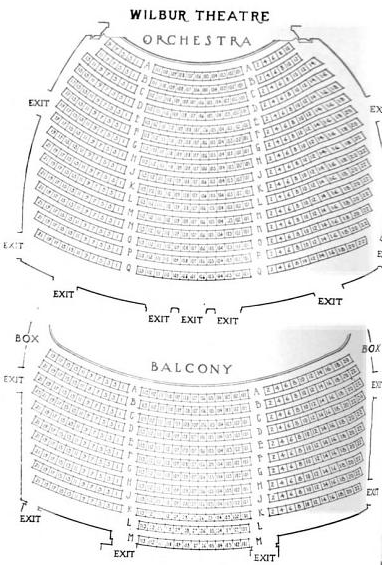
Seating chart, c. 1917

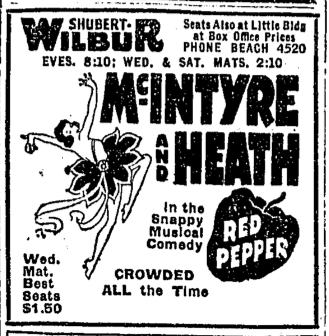
Advertisement, 1922

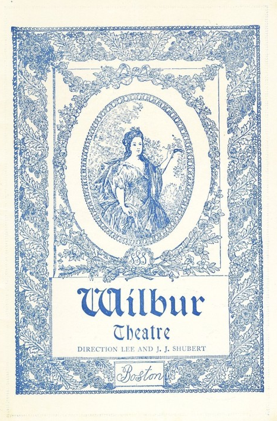
Program, 1922

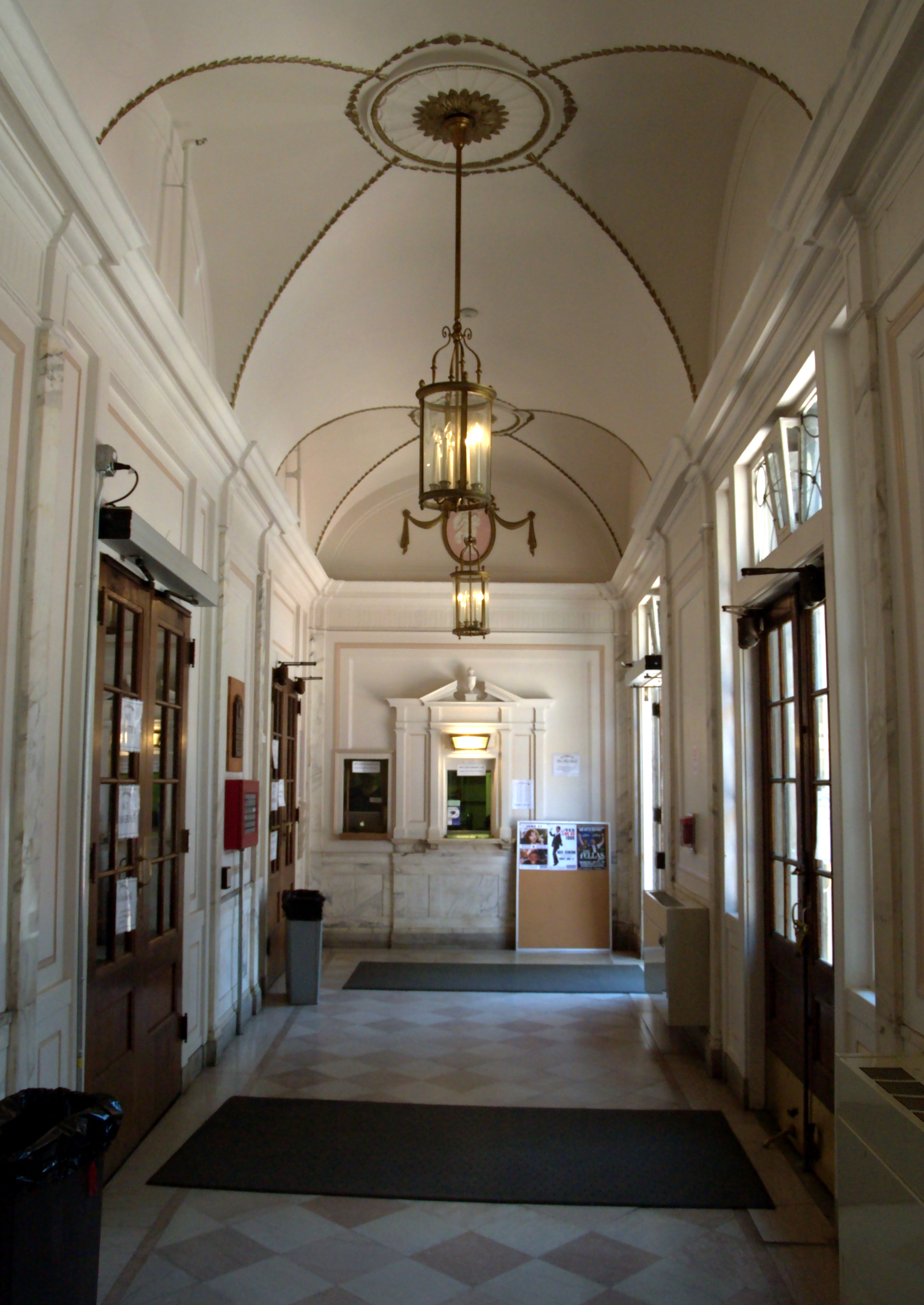
Lobby, 2009

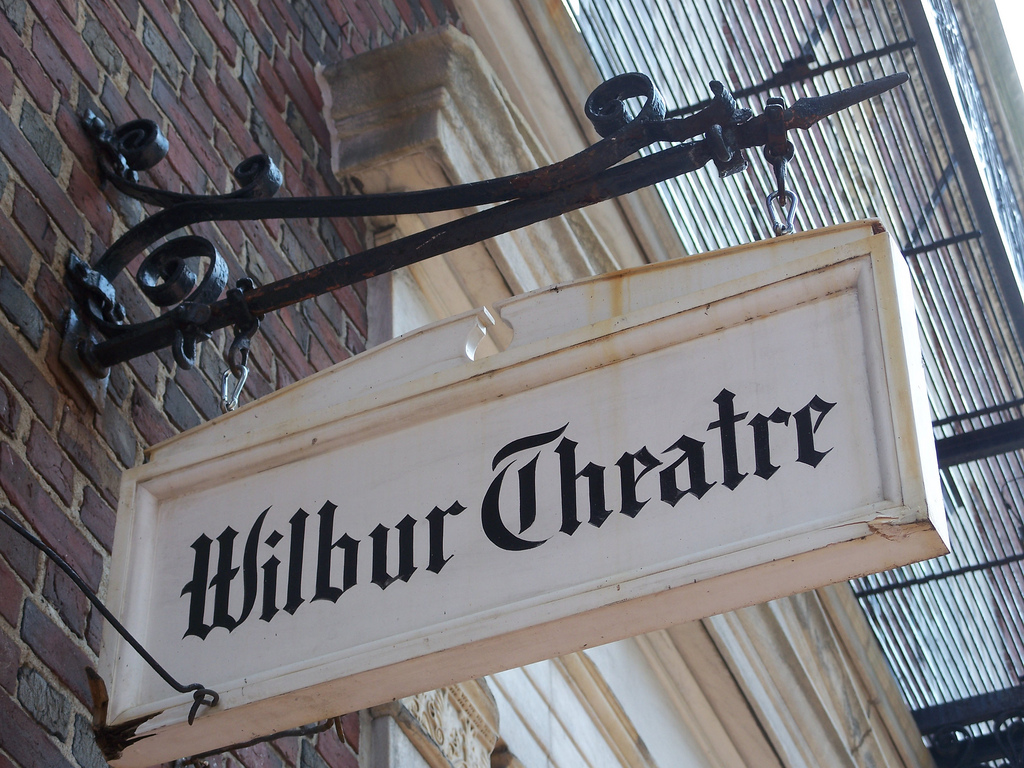
Sign, 2010
