= Love and Kisses (play) =

Love and Kisses is a play by Anita Rowe Block. Set in Michigan, the work is a comedy based around the topic of teenage marriage. It premiered in Boston in November 1963 at the Wilbur Theatre. It transferred to the Walnut Street Theatre in Philadelphia in early December 1963 before arriving at Broadway's Music Box Theatre where it opened on December 18, 1963. It ran for just thirteen performances; closing on December 28, 1963. Produced and directed by Dore Schary, the cast included Susan Browning as Elizabeth Pringle, Larry Parks as Jeff Pringle, Bert Convy as Freddy Winters, Michael Currie as T.J. Jones, Mary Fickett as Carol Pringle, Alberta Grant as Rosemary Cotts, Katharine Raht as Nanny, and Dennis Cooney as Buzzy Pringle. Helene Pons designed the costumes.

Critic Howard Taubman gave a negative review in The New York Times, writing "One has a right to expect that a play about teenage marriage will reach, at a minimum, the intellectual level of young teen-agers. Love and Kisses is not advanced enough for a none-too-bright 12-year-old." The Boston Globe critic Kevin Kelly found the work to be "pleasant, funny but also mindless". The Philadelphia Inquirer gave a positive review of the play deeming it as having the aroma of the "sweet smell of success".

The play has subsequently been staged at the Alhambra Dinner Theatre (1979) in Florida, the Glendale Centre Theatre (1990) in Los Angeles, and the Hale Centre Theatre (1995) in Utah. It was adapted into the 1965 film of the same name starring Ricky Nelson.
