= Bosko's Dizzy Date =

1932 film by Hugh Harman

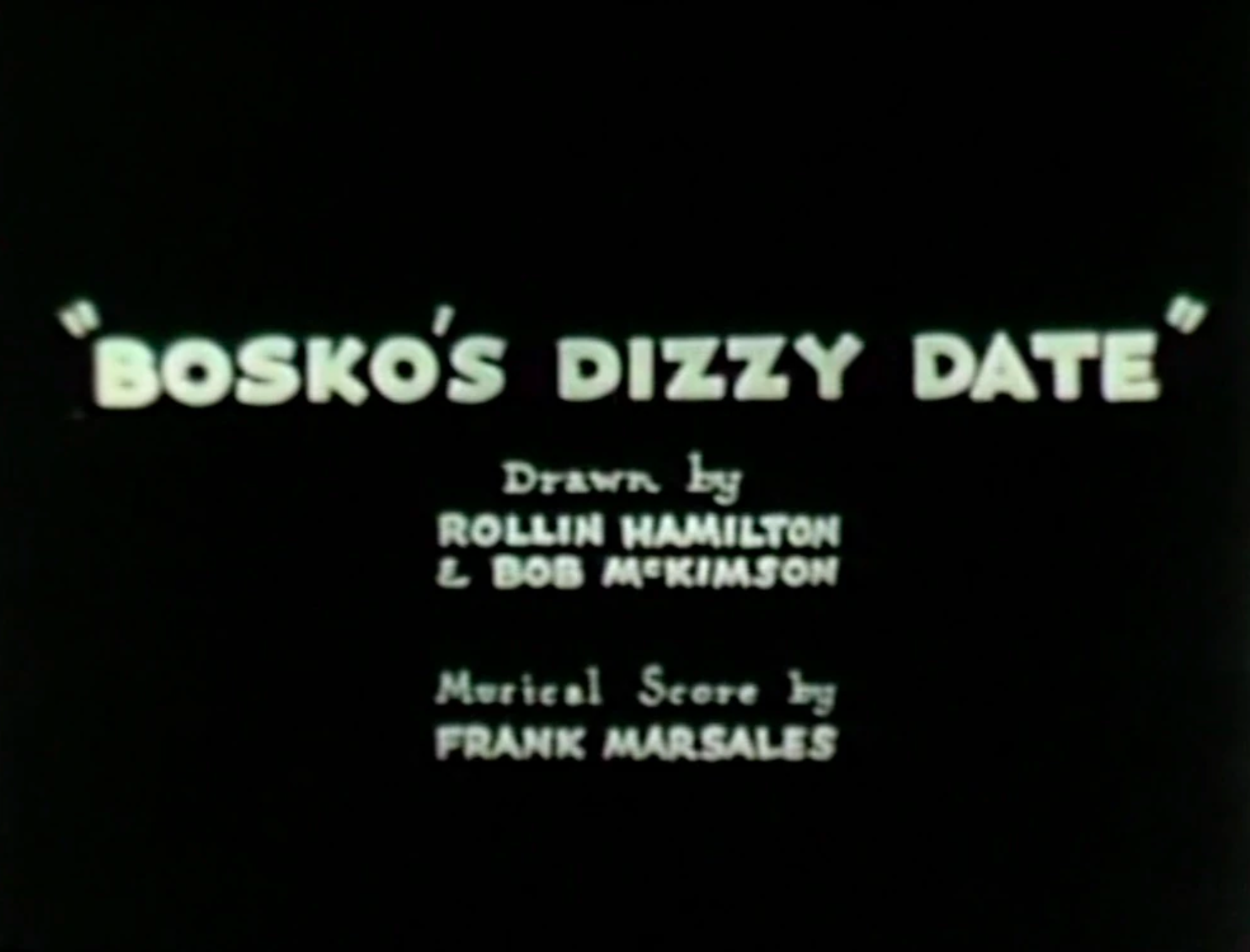
- Title card
- Directed by: Hugh Harman
- Produced by: Hugh Harman; Rudolf Ising; Leon Schlesinger
- Music by: Frank Marsales
- Animation by: Rollin Hamilton; Bob McKimson
- Color process: Black-and-white
- Production companies: Harman-Ising Productions; Leon Schlesinger Productions
- Distributed by: Warner Bros. Pictures; The Vitaphone Corporation
- Release date: November 14, 1932
- Running time: 7 min
- Country: United States
- Language: English

Bosko's Dizzy Date is a 1932 American animated comedy short film directed by Hugh Harman. It is the 28th film in the Looney Tunes series featuring Bosko. It was released on November 14, 1932. It is the third 1932 cartoon distributed by Warner Bros. Pictures to remain under copyright, as it was renewed in 1961, while earlier 1932 cartoons were neglected by then-owner, Warner Bros. subsidiary Sunset Productions; it will lapse into the public domain on January 1, 2028.

Prototypical cut titled Bosko and Honey

A complete prototypical cut with minute differences in scenes, titled Bosko and Honey, was produced but cancelled due to an overt amount of reused animation; much of its footage was reused in Bosko's Dizzy Date. This version was first released in VHS collections in 1999, long after it had lapsed into the public domain.

== Plot ==
Honey teaches Wilber how to play "In the Shade of the Old Apple Tree" on the violin to his chagrin, which he retaliates by playing it incorrectly. She leaves to call Bosko, who is still asleep and is unwilling to wake up. Bruno answers the call for him and forces him to respond to Honey. Honey recommends that they both go on a date, which Bosko agrees and immediately bikes to her place, while Wilber steps on the piano and plays with it to Honey's annoyance.

Bosko bikes while Bruno runs and periodically jumps across Bosko's hands like a hoop. They pass through a hollow log, resulting in them switching places, before switching once again through another hollow log. He accidentally rides on a wheel which Bruno then inadvertently moves backwards, moving forward once again after the wheel lands in water. Bosko arrives and alerts Honey by playing the tune correctly on a saxophone after Wilber makes another mistake. As Bosko and Honey sing, Wilber tries to disrupt them and decides to drop a bucket of soapy water on Bosko.

Bosko bikes while Honey rides on the basket. He rides through a boulder, throwing Honey into the air then catching her, for which she expresses her annoyance. Bruno carries their picnic goods. The duo chase a hen in their path, then run into a barn, where Honey dejectedly lands on a cow. Honey angrily ignores Bosko after he ridicules her. A storm then occurs, causing the duo to run for shelter. Bruno finds a hole but is struck by lightning, causing him to writhe in pain. The duo find shelter under a bridge, but Bosko is showered with water from a pipe, much to Honey's amusement.
