= Love and Kisses (film) =

1965 film by Ozzie Nelson

- Theatrical movie poster
- Directed by: Ozzie Nelson
- Screenplay by: Ozzie Nelson
- Based on: Love and Kisses by Anita Rowe Block
- Starring: Rick Nelson; Jack Kelly; Kristin Nelson; Jerry Van Dyke; Pert Kelton
- Cinematography: Robert C. Moreno
- Edited by: Newell P. Kimlin
- Music by: William Loose; Jimmie Haskell
- Distributed by: Universal Pictures
- Release dates: August 5, 1965 (Houston, Texas); October 13, 1965 (Minneapolis, Minnesota); December 22, 1965 (New York City)
- Running time: 87 minutes
- Country: United States
- Language: English

Love and Kisses is a 1965 American comedy film starring Rick Nelson (formerly "Ricky Nelson") as a young man who tries to grow up and emancipate himself from his middle-class parents by getting married. Based on the 1963 stage play of the same name by Anita Rowe Block, the film was written, produced and directed by Nelson's father, Ozzie Nelson.

== Plot ==
On the day he graduates from high school, Buzzy Pringle (Rick Nelson) secretly marries his girlfriend Rosemary (Kristin Nelson), whom he met at school and who still has to do another year because she has failed French. Buzzy's family are horrified on hearing the news of their wedding, especially as Buzzy, unable to care for Rosemary, suggests that for the time being he and his wife live in his old room in the Pringles' suburban home. At first Buzzy's parents suspect that Rosemary must be pregnant, but it soon turns out that neither of them has had sex before. It falls on Buzzy's father (Jack Kelly) to have a man-to-man talk with his son on the latter's wedding night and to tell him all there is to know about the birds and the bees.

The newlyweds' first marital crisis arises after only a few weeks when Rosemary, while her husband is away doing a summer job at the company his father works for, attempts to be a housewife but in fact lacks the necessary skills. The situation escalates when Buzzy finds out that it is his father rather than the company who is paying him. His confidence is temporarily shattered, but Buzzy quickly recovers and eventually is able to make some important decisions. He finds a real job and rents a small apartment and in the end is reunited with Rosemary.

== Cast ==
- Rick Nelson as Buzzy Pringle
- Jack Kelly as Jeff Pringle
- Kristin Nelson as Rosemary Cotts
- Jerry Van Dyke as Freddy
- Pert Kelton as Nanny
- Howard McNear as Mr. Frisby
- Barry Livingston as Bobby
- Alvy Moore as Officer Jones
- Madelyn Himes as Carol Pringle
- Sheilah Wells as Elizabeth Pringle
- Ivan Bonar as Assemblyman Potter

== Production notes ==
Ozzie Nelson bought the rights to Anita Rowe Block's 1963 stage play Love and Kisses, with the intention of adapting it for the screen as a vehicle for his son Rick. He then made a deal with Universal Pictures to write, produce and direct the feature. Nelson also cast Rick's then-wife Kristin as the love interest (Kristen also appeared as Rick's wife after they married in 1963 on The Adventures of Ozzie and Harriet).

Singer-songwriter Sonny Curtis was hired to write two songs for the film, "Love and Kisses" and "Say You Love Me" with Kristen Nelson in mind. Rick Nelson recorded the songs which were released as a single. To promote the film and the songs, Nelson performed them on the television series Shindig! on November 13, 1965.

== See also ==
- List of American films of 1965
