= Allen Rivkin =

American screenwriter

Allen Rivkin (20 November 1903 – 17 February 1990) was an American screenwriter.

Rivkin was an advertising copy writer, who went to Hollywood and joined the RKO Pictures publicity department. He formed a film writing team with P. J. Wolfson, who got a writer's contract on the strength of "Bodies Are Dust". They started at Universal Pictures the same day. Through a luncheon conversation that day, they decided to collaborate on a story. In less than two years the pair wrote ten screen plays. They later wrote for the B. P. Schulberg company at Paramount Pictures.

He was one of the co-founders of the Screenwriters Guild, later the Writers Guild of America. He wrote several of his scripts with his wife, Laura Kerr.

== Select credits ==
- Picture Snatcher (1933)
- Headline Shooter (1933)
- Dancing Lady (1933)
- Highway West (1941)
- Joe Smith, American (1942)
- Kid Glove Killer (1942)
- Till the End of Time (1946)
- The Farmer's Daughter (1947)
- Tension (1950)
- Prisoner of War (1954)
