= Meaghan Oppenheimer =

American screenwriter, producer, and former actress (born 1986)

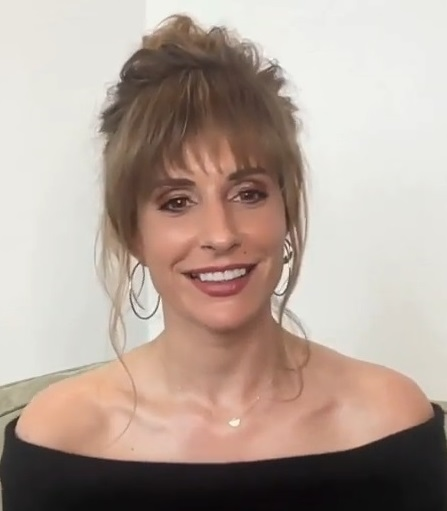
- Oppenheimer in 2022
- Born: 1986 (age 39–40); Tulsa, Oklahoma, U.S.
- Occupations: Screenwriter; producer
- Years active: 2010–present
- Known for: Tell Me Lies
- Spouse: Tom Ellis (m. 2019)
- Children: 1

Meaghan Oppenheimer (born 1986) is an American screenwriter, producer, and former actress.

== Early life and education ==
Meaghan Oppenheimer was born in 1986 and grew up in Tulsa, Oklahoma. She was a child actor, working in various regional theatre productions and television shows. Oppenheimer graduated from Holland Hall, and then NYU Tisch School of the Arts in 2009. After graduation, she relocated to Los Angeles to begin a screenwriting career.

== Career ==
In 2010, Oppenheimer wrote and starred in Hot Mess, a film about two roommates who become friends with benefits. She has written screenplays for projects including Fear the Walking Dead. (Note: Season 1, Episode 4 ("Not Fade Away."))

Her unproduced screenplay, The Remains, was selected for the 2013 Black List, an annual survey of the "most liked" screenplays not yet made into films.

She co-wrote the screenplay for the 2015 film We Are Your Friends with filmmaker Max Joseph.

In December 2015, ABC announced that Reese Witherspoon would produce a new television series written by Oppenheimer, with the working title Please Don't Go, about the personal and professional life of a ruthless divorce attorney in Dallas whose past continues to haunt her. In March 2016, ABC announced that Penelope Ann Miller had been cast opposite T. R. Knight in the project (Note: which was given the working title Meaghan Oppenheimer Pilot) that in 2016 was released as Broken—a series pilot that halted production after the first episode aired. (Note: Miller's role was that of "Elizabeth Hamilton, the wife of a Texas oil billionaire who is seeking revenge after having been left for a woman 20 years younger than she".)

In 2018, Oppenheimer wrote the script for the Facebook Watch TV show, Queen America.

Oppenheimer adapted Carola Lovering's novel Tell Me Lies into a Hulu series of the same name, which was released in 2022 and received positive reviews. She also served as co-executive producer and showrunner of the series, which starred Grace Van Patten and Jackson White. Her husband, Tom Ellis, starred in the second season.

== Personal life ==
Oppenheimer married Welsh actor Tom Ellis on June 1, 2019. She is stepmother to his three children. In 2023, the couple's daughter was born via surrogacy.

== Screenwriting credits ==
Year	Title	Role	Notes / Vehicle
2010	Hot Mess	Screenwriter / actress	Short film
2015	Fear the Walking Dead	Screenwriter	S1 E4: "Not Fade Away"
2015	We Are Your Friends	Screenwriter	Feature film
2016	Broken	Screenwriter	One episode (TV pilot)
2018	Queen America	Screenwriter	One episode / series creator (10 episodes)
2022–present	Tell Me Lies	Screenwriter / Executive Producer and Showrunner	Eight episodes / series creator (26 episodes)

== Acting credits ==
Year	Title	Role	Notes / Vehicle
2010	stalkTALK	Drew Walker	TV series: 8 episodes
2010	The Rock 'n' Roll Dreams of Duncan Christopher	Renee	comedy film
2011	LoveFinder	Lexi	TV movie
2011	How to Marry a Billionaire	Bree	TV movie
2012	LoveFinder: The Virals	Lexi	short film
