= Jackson White (actor) =

American actor (b. 1996)

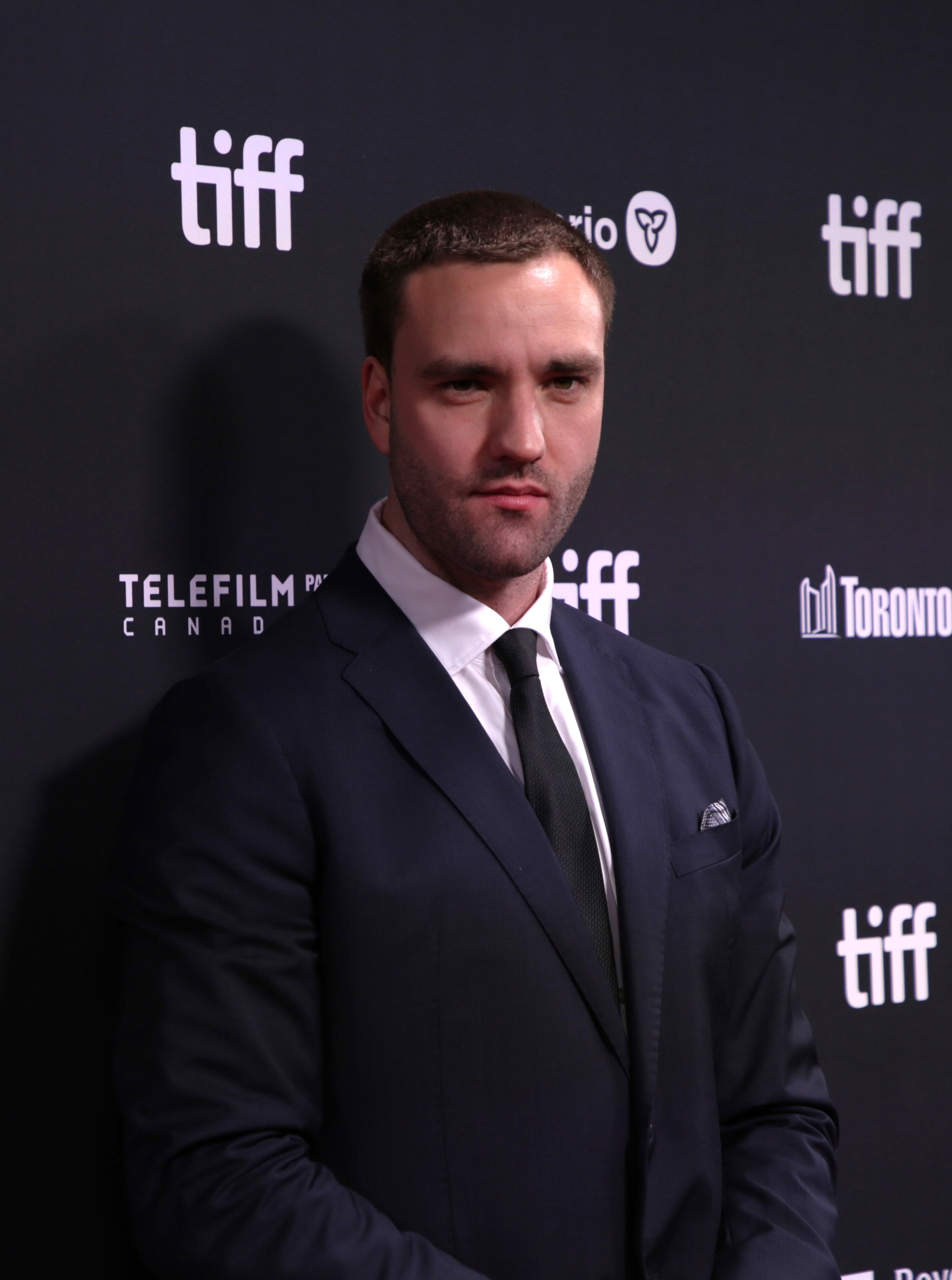
- White in 2025 at TIFF.
- Born: Jackson James White; March 1996 (age 30)
- Occupation: Actor
- Years active: 2016–present
- Parents: Jack White (father); Katey Sagal; (mother)
- Relatives: Boris Sagal (grandfather); Jean Sagal (aunt); Liz Sagal (aunt); Joey Sagal (uncle); Kurt Sutter (stepfather)

Jackson James White (born March 1996) is an American actor. He is best known for his roles as Stephen on the Hulu series Tell Me Lies, Brendan Fletcher on the HBO series Mrs. Fletcher, Ash Baker in the 2017 film SPF-18, Officer Zach in the 2022 film Ambulance, and Jud Crandall in the 2023 Paramount+ original film Pet Sematary: Bloodlines.

== Early life and education ==
Jackson White was born on March 1, 1996 to actress Katey Sagal and Jack White (1954–2024), and was raised in Los Angeles and Nashville. He has a sister named Sarah.

Before beginning a career in acting, he had considered doing music. He stated in an interview that he was "really shit in high school" but was able to attend the University of Southern California by completing an audition.

== Career ==
White began his acting career in 2016, when he made his short film debut in Confession as Eric. White made his television debut in the coming-of-age romantic comedy film SPF-18 as Ash Baker. White appeared as Aidan in the sitcom series The Middle, and as Dave Medders in the military drama series SEAL Team.

In 2019, White was cast to play the lead role of Brendan Fletcher in the comedy miniseries Mrs. Fletcher alongside Kathryn Hahn, Owen Teague and Cameron Boyce.

In 2021, White starred with Kelsey Grammer, Julia Goldani Telles, Paris Jackson, Andy Daly and William Fichtner in the coming-of-age comedy film The Space Between, where he played the lead role as Charlie Porter.

In 2022, White portrayed Officer Zach in the heist action thriller film Ambulance starring Jake Gyllenhaal and Yahya Abdul-Mateen II, a remake of the 2005 Danish film Ambulancen. The film premiered in Paris on March 20 and was theatrically released in the United States by Universal Pictures on April 8.

White was cast as the lead role of Stephen DeMarco in the drama streaming series Tell Me Lies with Grace Van Patten, based on the 2018 novel of the same name by Carola Lovering, which was released on Hulu on September 7, 2022.

In 2023, White played the lead role of Jud Crandall in the supernatural horror film Pet Sematary: Bloodlines. The film premiered at Fantastic Fest on September 23, 2023, which was followed by its streaming launch on Paramount+ on October 6.

== Personal life ==
Since 2022, White has been in a relationship with actress and Tell Me Lies co-star Grace Van Patten.

In July 2024, White's father died.

== Filmography ==
=== Film ===
Year	Title	Role	Notes
2016	Confession	Eric	Short
2017	SPF-18	Ash Baker	
2019	Number 2	Eric	Short
2021	The Space Between	Charlie Porter	
2022	Ambulance	Officer Zach	
2023	Pet Sematary: Bloodlines	Jud Crandall	
2025	Swiped	Justin Mateen	

=== Television ===
Year	Title	Role	Notes
2017–2018	The Middle	Aidan	4 episodes
2018	SEAL Team	Dave Medders	3 episodes
2019	Mrs. Fletcher	Brendan Fletcher	Main role (7 episodes)
2022–2026	Tell Me Lies	Stephen DeMarco	Main role
