= Helle Fagralid =

Danish actress (born 1976)

- Born: Helle Fagralid; 11 May 1976 (age 50); Helsingør
- Occupation: Actress
- Spouse: Ole Bornedal

Helle Fagralid (born 11 May 1976) is a Danish actress who has appeared in number of feature films and television series.

== Career ==
Fagralid played Iben in the TV-series Nikolaj og Julie (2002–2003), Freja, the goddess of love, in the TV-series Jul i Valhal (2005) and Maja Zeuthen, mother of the missing Emilie Zeuthen, in the popular TV-series Forbrydelsen III.

She is one of the two female leads in Laurits Munch-Petersen's Mellem os (2003), which among its many international awards won the Student Oscar as Honorary Foreign Film 2004.

Among her theatrical starring roles is Julie, the sympathetic hostage in the action-thriller Ambulancen (2005).

== Filmography ==
| Year | Title | Role | Other notes |
|---|---|---|---|
| 1988 | Rødtotterne og Tyrannos | Helen | |
| 1990 | Lad isbjørnene danse | Student | |
| 1992 | Mysteriet om det levende lig (TV) | Manette | |
| 1992 | Det skaldede spøgelse | Beatrice | |
| 1994 | Landsbyen (TV) | Girl at Bus Stop | |
| 1995 | Farligt venskab | Lina | |
| 1995 | Cirkus Ildebrand | Helle | |
| 1996 | Mørkeleg | uncredited | |
| 1997 | Hemmeligheder | Marika | |
| 1997 | Strisser på Samsø (TV) | Britt | |
| 1997 | Hotel Oslo (TV) | Jette | |
| 1997 | Nonnebørn | Marianne | |
| 1998 | Constance | Voice of Constance | |
| 1999 | Kærlighed ved første hik | Lotte | |
| 1999 | Klinkevals | | |
| 2000 | Sofia - født 1901 | Voice of Police Officer | |
| 2000 | Juliane | Henriette | |
| 2001 | Rejseholdet (TV) | Signe | |
| 2002 | Debutanten | Ophelia | |
| 2003 | Dykkerdrengen | Travel Guide | |
| 2003 | Reconstruction | Nan Sand | |
| 2003 | Mellem os | Sabine | |
| 2003 | Nikolaj og Julie (TV) | Iben | |
| 2003 | Detaljer (TV) | Emma | |
| 2004 | Den gode strømer | Girl at Stand | |
| 2004 | Kongekabale | Signe Jonsen | |
| 2005 | Bare Holger | Astrid Fjernballe | |
| 2005 | Ambulancen | Julie | |
| 2005 | Jul i Valhal (TV) | Freja | |
| 2006 | Istedgade | Ida | |
| 2008 | Blå mænd | Sofie | |
| 2009 | Original | Young Harriet | |
| 2012 | Forbrydelsen (TV) | Maja Zeuthen | |
