= Pet Sematary: Bloodlines =

2023 film by Lindsey Anderson Beer

- Release poster
- Directed by: Lindsey Anderson Beer
- Written by: Lindsey Anderson Beer; Jeff Buhler
- Based on: Pet Sematary by Stephen King
- Produced by: Lorenzo di Bonaventura; Mark Vahradian
- Starring: Jackson White; Forrest Goodluck; Jack Mulhern; Henry Thomas; Natalie Alyn Lind; Isabella Star LaBlanc; Samantha Mathis; Pam Grier; David Duchovny
- Cinematography: Benjamin Kirk Nielsen
- Edited by: Ken Blackwell; Jan Kovác
- Music by: Brandon Roberts
- Production companies: Paramount Players; Di Bonaventura Pictures
- Distributed by: Paramount+
- Release dates: September 23, 2023 (Fantastic Fest); October 6, 2023 (United States)
- Running time: 84 minutes
- Country: United States
- Language: English

Pet Sematary: Bloodlines is a 2023 American supernatural horror film directed by Lindsey Anderson Beer (in her directorial debut), and co-written by Beer and Jeff Buhler. It serves as a prequel to Pet Sematary (2019), which in turn was based on the 1983 novel of the same name by Stephen King. It is the fourth installment of the Pet Sematary film series and stars Jackson White, Forrest Goodluck, Jack Mulhern, Henry Thomas, Natalie Alyn Lind, Isabella Star LaBlanc, Samantha Mathis, Pam Grier and David Duchovny. Set in 1969, 50 years before the events of the previous film, the plot follows a young Jud Crandall as he discovers a local Native American cemetery where the dead can live again, without realizing the horror that will affect his life.

After the commercial success of Pet Sematary in 2019, producer Lorenzo di Bonaventura had plans for a prequel explaining the mythology and universe of the film. In February 2021, the film was green-lit, with Buhler and di Bonaventura returning in their roles as screenwriter and producer, respectively. Beer signed on as director in May 2021 and principal photography began in August of the same year.

Pet Sematary: Bloodlines premiered at Fantastic Fest on September 23, 2023, and was followed by its streaming launch on Paramount+ on October 6 and received generally negative reviews from critics.

== Plot ==
In 1969 Ludlow, Maine, a farmer named Bill Baterman drags the body of his son Timmy, who died by suicide after returning home from the Vietnam War, down into the pet cemetery, and buries him. Moments later, their dog Hendrix senses something and digs near Timmy's grave, where a hand bursts out and grabs the dog.

Jud Crandall lives with his parents Dan and Kathy, and is dating a young woman named Norma. He is set to leave Ludlow to join the Peace Corps in Michigan. While going into town with Norma, Jud runs into Bill and finds a photo of himself as a kid with Timmy and another local young man, Manny Rivers, who lives nearby with his sister Donna and also has aspirations for leaving Ludlow. Bill makes it seem like Timmy has been honorably discharged and has returned home.

The next day, Jud and Norma head off for their trip. They find Hendrix in front of the car, looking filthy and growling at them. They walk the dog back to the Baterman house, where they see Timmy. Hendrix bites Norma's arm, and Jud takes her to the hospital. Manny appears to hear noises from deep in the crops and sees blood dripping off a sunflower before he trips and impales his hand on a large thorn. Jud runs into Manny outside the hospital and tries to talk to him about Timmy. Manny suggests that Timmy may be suffering from PTSD from the war. When Jud returns to the Baterman home, he finds Timmy standing above a hog that has been gored to death, before seeing Bill and telling him about Hendrix. Meanwhile, Timmy is in the basement, writing down the names of several people in Ludlow with blood. He whispers to himself about killing them before they kill him.

Later that night, Officer Marjorie Washburn goes home and sees Hendrix there, with Timmy mocking her father's suicide. She calls Ludlow's mayor Hannibal Benson before the dog attacks her, though she survives after killing Hendrix. Donna is stalked and attacked by Timmy at home, where he chases her into the crops before grabbing her. Jud and Manny go to a priest, who tells them about the history of Ludlow and the pet cemetery. In 1674, the Mi'kmaq tribe lived on the land. Ludlow, for whom the town was named, was a settler who disappeared. His men found him after he was buried in the pet cemetery, feasting on human flesh before he is killed again for good. Jud confronts his dad with this knowledge, and he learns that the ancestors of the town's inhabitants have always guarded the town's secret in the hopes to keep others out of there.

Timmy buries Donna in the cemetery, leading her to rise up as an undead monstrosity. She goes to Norma's hospital room and reveals her decaying skin to her. Donna runs after Norma and kills a doctor before cornering her in the main office, where she starts to choke her. Jud later finds out Norma is in trouble while Dan tries to round up Mayor Benson, Marjorie, and Sheriff Anderson to find and kill Timmy, as Manny joins the group to find Donna. They enter the Baterman home after Bill agrees to help. Timmy kills Mayor Benson, Marjorie, and Anderson, while Donna fatally impales Dan with his own rifle. Manny shoots his undead sister, killing her.

Jud and Manny join Bill as he guides them through a tunnel that Timmy built, which is also where Norma has been left tied up while the hole she is in is filling up with mud. Timmy finds the three, and when Bill attempts to put his son down, Timmy disembowels him. Jud and Manny resurface into the swamp, where Timmy goes after Jud and tries to drown him. Manny fires a flare at Timmy's head, killing him for good. Norma breaks herself out of her pit and runs back to Jud.

In the aftermath, Jud and Norma stay with Kathy to continue his father's work of keeping the evil out of town, while Manny leaves Ludlow.

== Cast ==
- Jackson White as Judson
- Natalie Alyn Lind as Norma
- Forrest Goodluck as Manny
- Isabella Star LaBlanc as Donna
- Henry Thomas as Dan Crandall
- Jack Mulhern as Timmy Baterman
- David Duchovny as Bill Baterman
- Samantha Mathis as Kathy Crandall
- Pam Grier as Marjorie Washburn
- Christian Jadah as Sheriff Anderson
- Matt Holland as Mayor Hannibal Benson

Additionally, Vincent Leclerc plays a priest and Ted Whittall plays a hospital visitor.

== Production ==
In March 2019, producer Lorenzo di Bonaventura stated that a prequel to Pet Sematary (2019) was possible if the film was a success financially. The following month, directors Kevin Kölsch and Denis Widmyer ruled themselves out of returning, saying, "If you were going to do more, you'd probably do backstory stuff. [...] I'd be really interested to see how somebody would do a sequel to this movie. It probably won't be us".

In May, screenwriter Jeff Buhler stated that there had been preliminary discussions on a continuation, saying, "So a lot of the ideas that we've been batting around currently, recently, have all been about, more about digging into the mythology of the town, these rituals that children present, the mythology of the Micmac, the Wendigo, the cemetery, the origins, Jud's life. So it looks like, I don't want to promise anything, because we don't know, we're not even down the road on an idea yet."

The film was officially announced in February 2021, with Buhler and di Bonaventura returning as screenwriter and producer, respectively. Lindsey Beer was hired to direct in May. In June, Jackson White was cast as a young Jud Crandall. The following month, Pam Grier joined the cast. Principal photography took place in Montreal in August, with some scenes being shot at John Abbott College.

== Release ==
Pet Sematary: Bloodlines premiered at Fantastic Fest on September 23, 2023. It was released by Paramount+ on October 6, 2023, in the United States, Canada, and Latin America, and the following day in other territories.

== Reception ==
=== Critical response ===
On the review aggregator website Rotten Tomatoes, 24% of 59 critics' reviews are positive, with an average rating of 4.5/10. The website's consensus reads: "Pet Sematary: Bloodlines takes half-hearted stabs at expanding the world of Stephen King's original story, but they're largely lost in a substandard story that mistakes bland gore for effective horror." Metacritic, which uses a weighted average, assigned the film a score of 31 out of 100, based on 10 critics, indicating "generally unfavorable" reviews.

Michael Nordine writing for Variety said, "Among the film's many flaws — its flat aesthetics, the forgettable characters who inhabit it (including David Duchovny and Pam Grier, both underused) — perhaps the most egregious is its utter lack of atmosphere. There's no sense of foreboding despite its attempts to unsettle, no feeling that the early warning signs are leading to anything especially frightening. Audiences already know what the eponymous burial ground does to anyone (or anything) unlucky enough to be interred there, and Bloodlines does little to live up to or expand the mythos". Bob Strauss of the San Francisco Chronicle wrote, "It's a better horror movie than the 2019 remake, but like Mary Lambert's 1989 production, it still feels unnecessary. Cool as the concept of a magic graveyard that brings beloved pets and, later, not so lovely people back from the dead may be, this remains second-rate King movie material".

== Post-release ==
In September 2023, Beer stated that she would like to develop additional Pet Sematary installments to expand the franchise, which could further explore the origins of the evil in the franchise, while the filmmaker expressed interest in being involved in the potential future. By October of the same year, producer di Bonaventura stated that all creatives involved are considering developing a sequel, while producer Vahradian stated that future installments may further explore the demonic entity which causes the horrific events of the franchise. Later that same month, Beer confirmed that there are ongoing discussions to create additional Pet Sematary films, which may further detail the history of the ancient evil in Ludlow Town.
