= Lindsey Anderson Beer =

American filmmaker

- Occupations: Director, screenwriter, producer
- Writing career
- Notable work: Pet Sematary: Bloodlines (2023)

Lindsey Anderson Beer is an American filmmaker. She made her feature directorial debut with Pet Sematary: Bloodlines (2023). She also wrote the 2018 Netflix film Sierra Burgess Is a Loser and worked on The Magic Order, as well as Chaos Walking.

In 2018, Anderson Beer founded a production company, called Known Universe, together with Geneva Robertson-Dworet and Nicole Perlman. Known Universe has so far announced that it was going to help produce the new adaptation of William Golding's Lord of the Flies.

== Filmography ==
Film

Year	Title	Director	Writer	Executive Producer
2018	Sierra Burgess Is a Loser	No	Yes	Yes
2021	Chaos Walking	No	Uncredited	No
2023	Pet Sematary: Bloodlines	Yes	Yes	No

Television

Year	Title	Writer	Executive Producer
2023	The Magic Order	Yes	Yes
