= Alex Israel =

American artist

- Born: October 1982 (age 43); Los Angeles, California, U.S.
- Education: Yale University (BA); University of Southern California (MFA)

Alex Israel (born October 1982) is an American multimedia artist, writer, and designer from Los Angeles. His work includes large, colorful airbrushed paintings of abstract gradients and Los Angeles skies, his self-portraits, painted on shaped fiberglass panels, and multimedia installations constructed from movie-house props.

== Early life and education ==
The son of a real estate developer, Israel was born at UCLA Medical Center. He grew up in Westwood alongside two sisters. He attended Harvard-Westlake School in Studio City before completing his undergraduate studies at Yale University in 2003. His first summer back from Yale, he worked part-time as an intern for the conceptual artist John Baldessari, and for Ann Goldstein, who was a curator at MOCA at the time. Later, he worked as an assistant at the gallery Blum & Poe before moving to New York City to work at Sotheby's auction house. After working for the artist Jason Rhoades, followed by a brief stint as a salesperson for Hauser & Wirth. He went on to receive a M.F.A. from the University of Southern California’s Roski School of Fine Arts in 2010.

== Work ==
Early in his career, Israel maintained a studio at 3113 Beverly Boulevard in Filipinotown. Since 2016, he has been working from a 980 m^{2} (10,600 sq ft) studio at Warner Bros.’ Burbank backlot, designed by Johnston Marklee & Associates.

=== AS IT LAYS ===
Between July 2011 and May 2012, Israel produced a web series called, "AS IT LAYS," in which he interviews 33 LA celebrities. The diverse group of subjects includes Rachel Zoe, Oliver Stone, Perez Hilton, Michael Chow, Jamie Lee Curtis, and Marilyn Manson. The first thirty videos were shot in the Pacific Design Center in West Hollywood, and on location at the subjects’ homes and offices. The series premiered during an exhibition at Reena Spaulings Fine Art March 11 through April 8, 2012. The first thirty videos were released online.

On May 19, 2012, The MOCA LA presented the series as a special one-night screening and performance event. In between screenings of video portraits, Israel created three additional interviews with surprise guests Laird Hamilton, Molly Ringwald and Melanie Griffith, in front of the live audience.

=== Easter Island Venice Beach ===
From July 13–15, 2012, "Easter Island Venice Beach" was erected in the recreational area of Venice Beach as part of the Hammer Museum’s Venice Beach Biennial. Curated by Ali Subotnik, the installation plays off the Easter Island statues in the southeastern Pacific Island. Israel says that he was inspired when he found four giant replicas of the sculptures at a prop house in Hollywood a few years earlier.

=== Rough Winds ===
The first of his video series, produced in 2010, invites viewers to "watch and follow the lives of jaded young adults as they navigate the golden light and melancholic shadows of life in the magical dreamscape of Los Angeles." The dialogue-free series is composed of a trailer and ten clips between two and six minutes long.

=== SPF-18 ===
Israel directed SPF-18, a feature-length teen surf film and multi-platform project, which was written by Michael Berk and released on both Netflix and the ITunes Store on September 29, 2017. It featured Noah Centineo in a starring role in addition to Molly Ringwald, as well as cameos by Keanu Reeves and Pamela Anderson.

=== Work with Bret Easton Ellis ===
In 2016, Israel and Bret Easton Ellis worked together on a set of collaborative paintings, taking samples of Ellis's text and laying them across stock images of Los Angeles that Israel selected and purchased the licensing to.

== Other activities ==
From 2010, Israel designed a line of sunglasses called Freeway Eyewear, that he sold online as well as at Barneys New York and Gagosian Gallery in New York. In 2018, he launched Infrathin, a casual clothing line named for the term coined by Marcel Duchamp.

In 2019, Israel collaborated with German luggage maker Rimowa on creating a 20-foot-tall replica of a Rimowa roller suitcase. In 2020, he worked with Louis Vuitton on designing the packaging of three fragrances.

== Collections ==
Work by Israel is included in the collections of the Moderna Museet, Museum Boijmans Van Beuningen, MOCA, LACMA, Whitney Museum of American Art, MoMA, The Jewish Museum, Solomon R. Guggenheim Museum, and Astrup Fearnley Museet.

== Personal life ==
Israel lives on Sunset Boulevard.
