= SPF-18 =

- Promotional poster
- Directed by: Alex Israel
- Written by: Alex Israel; Alex Malowidzki; Michael Berk
- Produced by: Kirsten Smith; Konstanty Godzisz; China Chow; Alex Waite; Olga Przylipiak
- Starring: Carson Meyer; Noah Centineo; Bianca A. Santos; Jackson White; Molly Ringwald; Rosanna Arquette; Lidia Bronicka
- Narrated by: Goldie Hawn
- Cinematography: Joseph Aguirre; Agata Kolanek
- Edited by: Tessa Davis; Mike Hugo
- Music by: Emile Haynie; Gabriela Korzeń
- Distributed by: iTunes; Netflix
- Release date: September 29, 2017
- Running time: 75 minutes
- Country: United States
- Language: English

SPF-18 is a 2017 American coming-of-age romantic comedy film directed by Alex Israel in his directorial debut. Israel co-wrote the screenplay with Michael Berk. The film stars Carson Meyer, Noah Centineo, Bianca A. Santos, Jackson White, Molly Ringwald and Rosanna Arquette, and is narrated by Goldie Hawn.

== Summary ==
Seventeen year old Penny Cooper is obsessed with filmography, since as a child it was the only way to get close to her mother, a Hollywood actress. She just graduated high school and is looking forward to the next four years at Northwestern.

Johnny is still coping with the loss of his dad, when he is asked to house sit for a friend. His friend tells him to "live it up" and invite friends to stay at the house, which is very luxurious and by the beach. Johnny then invites Penny, who is his girlfriend, and her free-spirited cousin, Camilla.

Knowing Penny has not lost her virginity to Johnny yet, she suggests a "prom do-over." Penny and Johnny have sex that night. After the do-over, Camilla spots a person swimming nude on the beach. Unbeknownst to her, the person is Ash Baker, a country singer who quit his agency after they tried to change his image.

The next morning, a local lifeguard named Steve attempts to cite Ash for camping on the beach. Penny, Camilla and Johnny intervene and invite Ash to the house. After exchanging pleasantries the group takes a group surfing lesson with Steve later that day. Camilla complains that the wetsuits are all plain and black. Later that night the group bond back at the house. Penny and Ash begin to bond in particular. Still upset about his father's death, Johnny rides off from the group to do some night surfing.

== Cast ==
- Carson Meyer as Penny Cooper
- Noah Centineo as Johnny Sanders Jr.
- Bianca A. Santos as Camilla Barnes
- Jackson White as Ash Baker
- Sean Russel Herman as Steve Galmarini
- Molly Ringwald as Linda Sanders
- Rosanna Arquette as Faye Cooper
- Keanu Reeves as himself
- Pamela Anderson as herself
- Goldie Hawn as the narrator

== Production ==
Principal photography took place in Malibu, California in May 2015. The film was released on iTunes on September 29, 2017, and was made available on Netflix in October 2017.

== Reception ==
On Rotten Tomatoes, the film has 2 reviews; both are negative.
