= Miss Conception =

2008 film directed by Eric Styles

- Directed by: Eric Styles
- Written by: Camilla Leslie; Katherine Chandler
- Starring: Heather Graham; Mia Kirshner; Tom Ellis; Orlando Seale
- Music by: Christian Henson
- Release date: March 5, 2008
- Running time: 94 minutes
- Countries: United Kingdom; United States
- Language: English

Miss Conception (original title "Buy Borrow Steal") is a 2008 comedy film directed by Eric Styles and starring Heather Graham. Graham plays a woman who learns she has only one month left to conceive a child. When her baby-phobic long-term boyfriend (Tom Ellis) goes to film a documentary on a remote island with a spoiled former supermodel, she is forced to find alternate ways to conceive with the help of her friend Clem (Mia Kirshner). The film was produced by Miromar Entertainment and Blue Angel Films.

== Plot ==
Georgina Salt (Heather Graham) is a young English contractor living in London who longs to have a baby, which she sees as the one thing missing from her life. In the opening scene, Zach, Georgina's long-time boyfriend, is talking on the phone with his sister, who has just had a baby girl. Georgina is obviously more interested in the baby than Zach. After Zach gets off the phone, the couple goes back into their bedroom where Georgina seduces Zach. Zach, however, uses a condom, much to the dismay of Georgina.

The next day, Georgina goes shopping for a present for Zach's sister's baby with her mother. Georgina is taken away by the baby items around her and is saddened by it. When a doctor's ad for his clinic for women who want to get pregnant, but may not be able to conceive for much longer, Georgina's mother mentions her aunt. Presuming that her aunt was a lesbian, Georgina was never surprised that her aunt had no children, however her mother informs her that she was simply unable to have children; she was too late.

A frantic Georgina spends £150 on a blanket, to the surprise of her mother, before leaving the store. At Zach's sister's house, Georgina is taken by the baby and is allowed to hold her as Zach goofs off with his sister's belly sculpture. After breaking the sculpture, Zach blames it on her three-year-old son and the couple soon leave.

In the car, Georgina gets upset with Zach over the statue and she is about to ask him a question before he cuts her off saying, "I do not hate babies." Georgina jumps to the conclusion that he does hate babies and demands that he pull over and lets her out. Zach goes to a friend's house to 'crash' while Georgina heads home.

Prior to this event, Georgina had gone to the clinic to see how many eggs she had left; her best friend Clem goes with her and receives the call that the two of them are to return. The doctor informs Georgina that she only has one egg left and that she'd be ovulating for four days. The two women go out on a 'date' with a young man named Justin, who is completely taken aback when Georgina announces that she has one egg left.

Clem and Justin help Georgina form a plan to sleep with a random stranger. On day one, Georgina has an "open house" to rent out her apartment in order to lure men inside. The first few are turned away due to their looks or their orientation. Finally, a man of great quality comes along, however just before he and Georgina kiss, Zach calls.

Georgina kicks the man out and talks to Zach, but then hears a woman's voice saying, "Zach, darling, will you zip me up?" An angry Georgina hangs up the phone and Zach isn't too pleased with the woman - Alexandra. Alexandra is the daughter of a rich man who is funding Zach's latest documentary; she is also the reason why Georgina was unable to speak to Zach before he left for a trip.

On day two, Georgina goes to a funeral to pick up a man overcome with "emotions" and isn't thinking too well. She takes him back to her apartment, leaves to get wine and as she is in the kitchen he discovers her "PLAN" sheet that has all the details about her seducing him on it. He is disgusted and leaves, as Georgina tries to explain herself.

Day three, Georgina finds herself with Clem at a night club. They see a very good looking young man, dancing very seductively and attracting all the girls' attention, and Georgina goes to seduce him. Before successfully seducing the man, she rips her dress in several places to make herself more sultry.

At the hotel, Georgina is about to go all the way with him, before she excuses herself to go to the bathroom. While she is taking out her breast pads and washing her mouth out, he steals some of her money and a card before leaving. Georgina comes out to find the lights off and him gone. After cursing her stupidity – and noticing her money and card gone – she goes home.

During this time, Zach is seen trying to hurry back to London and has to take the ferry because Alexandra had taken the last ticket going to London. Georgina and Clem purchase sperm from the Internet and go out to buy a turkey baster. At this time, Georgina reveals to Clem that she only wants Zach, before she says that she can't believe that the future father of her child is a turkey baster.

Georgina, seeming desperate at this point, turns to one of her employees who reveals that he is infertile just before the two of them can have sex. She then plans to go through with the artificial insemination, reading the directions as the sperm arrives. Her mother arrives with a birthday cake and Georgina accidentally squirts the sperm on the cake. Clem intends Justin, her so-called pet, to impregnate Georgina. A nervous Justin doesn't seem to want to go through with it. They go to a hotel room and Justin can't seem to get off, nor is he comfortable with this idea. Justin can't do it and backs out.

She begins to spank him, before she is thrown out of the hotel by the staff. She runs into a friend of Zach's and is comforted by him. While hugging him, Zach walks in and assumes that they are having an affair and slaps his friend before leaving. Georgina runs after him, but loses him. She misses her chance to get pregnant and mopes around because she lost both her chance to have a baby and Zach.

Ben, Zach's friend, comes over to check on Georgina and the two begin to talk about how awkward the situation was just as the doorbell rings. Clem gets it and turns out that it's Zach, who is outraged to find Ben and Georgina holding hands. He slaps Ben again, who, in turn, punches Zach. The two have a scuffle, during which Ben tells Zach that while Georgina is OK, she isn't Clem. Clem, hearing this, asks him to repeat that and after establishing that he likes Clem and not Georgina, he gets off Zach and goes to Clem.

Georgina asks about Alexandra, who Zach admits is beautiful, but says that isn't all he looks for in a person. She isn't impressed by his reasoning, however Zach continues on trying to explain that he loves her and had never stopped. Zach reveals that he wants children too, however an upset Georgina leaves and Ben has to explain to Zach what had been going on. At work, Georgina's worker reveals that he understands why she left and leaves before Zach comes in with a dozen roses.

Four months later, while Georgina is running her breasts and belly feel sore and goes to a clinic for a pregnancy test. She receives a call informing her that she is, in fact, pregnant. At a birthday party for Zach, it is revealed that they are engaged and Georgina tells him that she's pregnant. Zach is overjoyed about the news.

== Cast ==
- Heather Graham as Georgina Salt
- Mia Kirshner as Clem
- Tom Ellis as Zach

== Reception ==
On Rotten Tomatoes 8% of 13 critics rated the film positively On Metacritic the film had a weighted average score of 33 out of 100 based on 5 reviews, indicating "generally unfavorable reviews".

== Alternative titles ==
- Buy Borrow Steal - Original Working Title.
- Last Minute Baby - German DVD Title.
- Un bébé à tout prix - French Television Title.
