= Tom Ellis (actor) =

Welsh actor (born 1978)

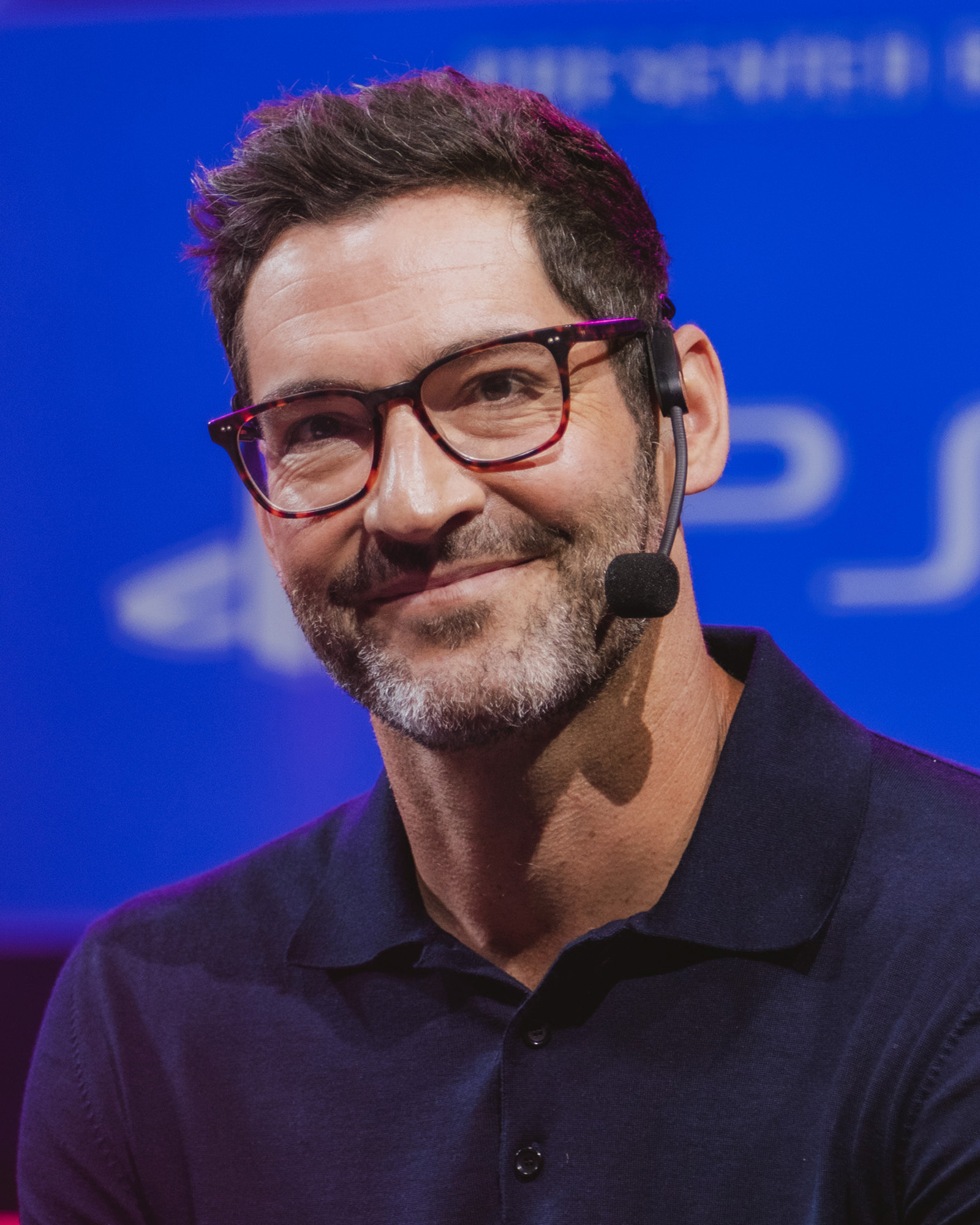
- Ellis in 2024
- Born: Thomas John Ellis; 17 November 1978 (age 47); Cardiff, Wales
- Occupation: Actor
- Years active: 2000–present
- Spouses: Tamzin Outhwaite (m. 2006; div. 2014); Meaghan Oppenheimer (m. 2019)
- Children: 4

Thomas John Ellis (born 17 November 1978) is a Welsh actor. He became known for playing Gary Preston in the BBC One sitcom Miranda (2009–2015), then achieved wider recognition for his role as Lucifer Morningstar in the Fox/Netflix urban fantasy series Lucifer (2016–2021), also the Arrowverse franchise crossover "Crisis on Infinite Earths" (2019), and Colin Glass in the CBS drama series CIA (2026–present).

== Early life ==
Thomas John Ellis was born at University Hospital of Wales in Cardiff on 17 November 1978, the son of Marilyn Jean (née Hooper) and Christopher John Ellis. He has three sisters, one of whom is his twin; when they were born, they broke the Welsh record for heaviest twins. His father, uncle, and one of his sisters are all Baptist ministers. Shortly after his birth, the family left Wales for England and settled in Sheffield, where he attended High Storrs School and played the French horn in the city's youth orchestra. He later earned a BA in Dramatic Studies from the Royal Scottish Academy of Music and Drama in Glasgow.

== Career ==
Ellis first became known for his role as Gary Preston on the BBC One sitcom Miranda (2009–2015). His other roles around this time included Justyn in the Channel 4 series No Angels (2005–2006), Thomas Milligan in the Doctor Who episode "Last of the Time Lords" (2007), and King Cenred in the BBC series Merlin (2008). He has also appeared in the soap opera EastEnders, the sketch comedy show The Catherine Tate Show, and the medical drama Holby City, and the comedy-drama Monday Monday. He was cast as Detective Inspector Bland in Agatha Christie's Poirot.

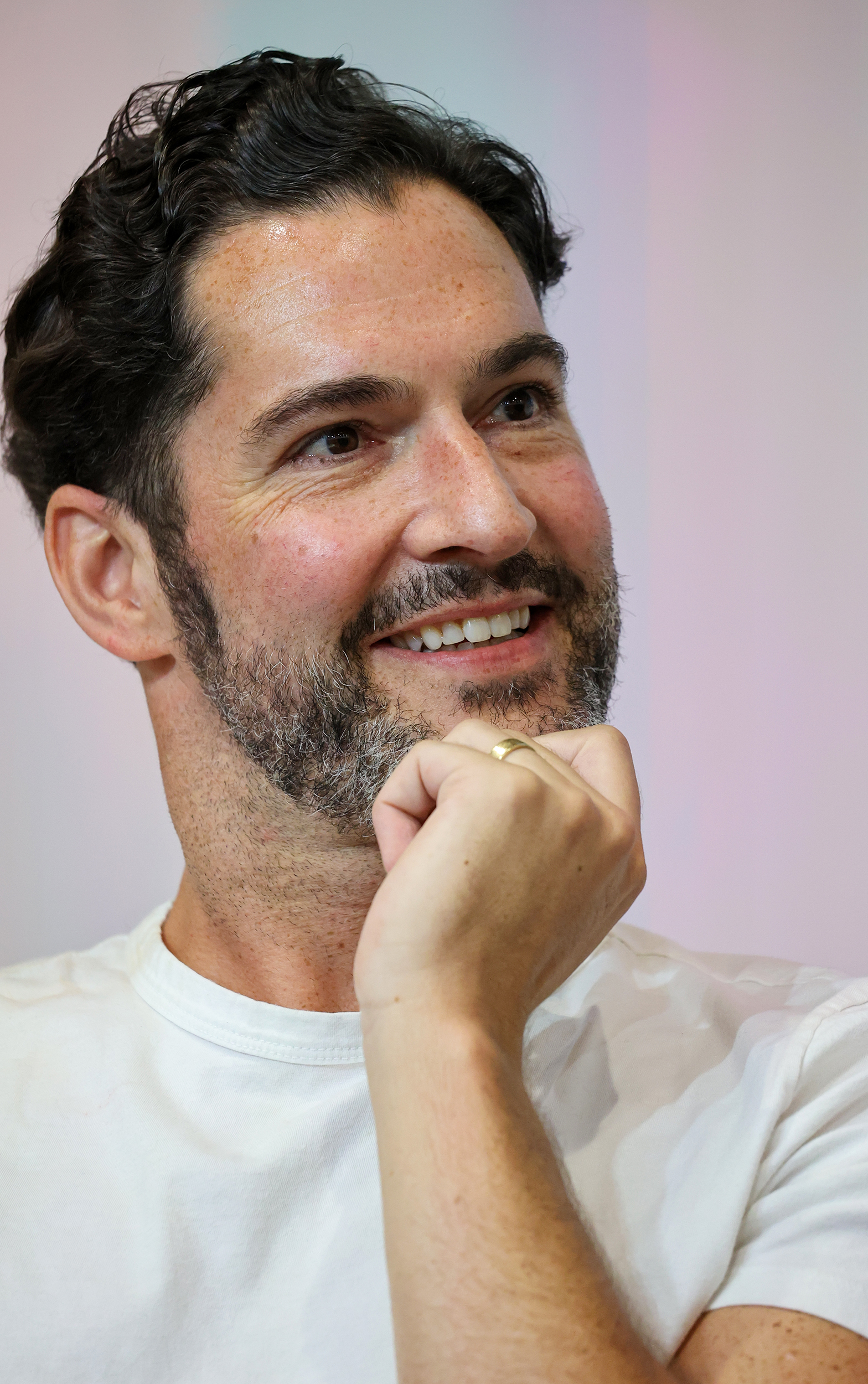
Ellis in September 2022

Ellis had his breakout role as Lucifer Morningstar in the Fox/Netflix series Lucifer (2016–2021), based on DC Comics' character of the same name. On 23 June 2020, it was announced that Netflix had renewed the show for a sixth and final season. He reprised the role for The Flash crossover Arrowverse episode "Crisis on Infinite Earths". He won the 2021 Tell-Tale TV Award for Favorite Actor in a Cable or Streaming Sci-fi/Fantasy/Horror Series.

Ellis starred as Nick in the Netflix romantic comedy film Players (2024) and voiced GodCat in the animated series Exploding Kittens (2024). In April 2025, he was cast as the leading role of the upcoming CBS series CIA.

== Personal life ==
In 2006, Ellis married English actress Tamzin Outhwaite, to whom he was introduced by Scottish actor James McAvoy. They had a son and a daughter together before she filed for divorce in September 2013, citing adultery after Ellis admitted to having an affair with an unnamed co-star while filming Gothica. The divorce was finalised in April 2014. Ellis also has a daughter from an earlier relationship.

Ellis married American screenwriter Meaghan Oppenheimer on 2 June 2019. They reside in Los Angeles. Their daughter was born via surrogate in November 2023.

When asked by Zoe Williams in a January 2025 interview if he believed he was destined for an acting career, Ellis replied, "I grew up in the church so talking about stuff like that is quite interesting because people would believe that if you had faith it would be like God's work, doing it for you, and he's had a plan for you and all those things. I don't personally share that belief these days, but who knows?"

== Filmography ==
=== Film ===
Year	Title	Role
2001	High Heels and Low Lifes	Uniformed Officer
2001	Buffalo Soldiers	Squash
2003	I'll Be There	Ivor
2004	Vera Drake	Police Constable
2005	The Best Man	Groom
2006	Calon Gaeth	Edward
2008	Miss Conception	Zak
2019	Isn't It Romantic	Dr. Todd
2024	Players	Nick Russel
2025	The Thursday Murder Club	Jason Ritchie

=== Television ===
Year	Title	Role	Notes
2000	Kiss Me Kate	Ben	Episode: "Kate's Niece"
2001	The Life and Adventures of Nicholas Nickleby	John Browdie	Television film
2001	Jack and the Beanstalk: The Real Story	Bigger boy 1	Miniseries
2001–2002	Nice Guy Eddie	Frank Bennett	Main role
2002	Wild West	Bungee jump instructor	Episode: "Fear of Bungee"
2002	Linda Green	Marko	Episode: "Viva Espana"
2003	Pollyanna	Timothy	Television film
2003	Holby City	David Jones	Episode: "Endgame"
2004	Messiah III: The Promise	Dr. Phillip Ryder	2 episodes
2005	Twisted Tales	Alex	Episode: "The Irredeemable Brain of Dr Heinrich Hunsecker"
2005	Doctors	Ricky Adams	Episode: "Slim Chance"
2005	Midsomer Murders	Lee Smeeton	Episode: "Midsomer Rhapsody"
2005	Waking the Dead	Harry Taylor	Episode: "Straw Dog"
2005	Love Soup	Mike	Episode: "Take Five"
2005	ShakespeaRe-Told	Claudio	Episode: "Much Ado About Nothing"
2005–2006	No Angels	Justyn	4 episodes
2006	EastEnders	Dr. Oliver Cousins	Recurring role
2006	Pulling	Sam	2 episodes
2006–2007	Suburban Shootout	PC Haines	Main role
2006–2007	The Catherine Tate Show	Detective Sergeant Sam Speed	2 episodes
2007	Casualty	Joe Kelsall	Episode: "Combat Indicators: Part 1"
2007	Doctor Who	Tom Milligan	Episode: "Last of the Time Lords"
2008	Trial & Retribution	Nick Fisher	2 episodes
2008	The Passion	Apostle Philip	4 episodes
2008	Harley Street	Dr Ross Jarvis	Recurring role
2009	Monday Monday	Steven McColl	Main role
2009–2015	Miranda	Gary Preston	Main role
2010	Dappers	Marco	Episode: "Proper Job"
2010	Merlin	Cenred	4 episodes
2010	Accused	Neil McGray	Episode: "Liam's Story"
2011	Sugartown	Max Burr	Main role
2011	The Fades	Mark Etches	Main role
2012	Silent Witness	Father Jacobs	Episode: "Fear"
2012	Playhouse Presents	Bill	Episode: "The Other Woman"
2012	Gates	Mark Pearson	5 episodes
2012	The Secret of Crickley Hall	Gabe Caleigh	Miniseries
2013	Once Upon a Time	Robin Hood	Episode: "Lacey"
2013	Agatha Christie's Poirot	Detective Inspector Bland	Episode: "Dead Man's Folly"
2013	Gothica	Victor Frankenstein	Television film
2014	Under Milk Wood	Mr. Ogmore	Television film
2014	Rush	Dr. William Rush	Main role
2015	The Strain	Rob Bradley	Episode: "Identity"
2016–2021	Lucifer	Lucifer Morningstar / Michael Demiurgos	Main role
2018	Family Guy	Oscar Wilde (voice)	Episode: "V Is for Mystery"
2018	Queen America	Andy	2 episodes
2019	The Flash	Lucifer Morningstar	Episode: "Crisis on Infinite Earths: Part Three"
2022	Robot Chicken	Michelin Man (voice)	Episode: "May Cause Indecision...Or Not"
2022	The Great North	Rick Chateau (voice)	Episode: "Dick, Rick, Groom Adventure"
2024	Exploding Kittens	Godcat (voice)	Main role
2024	Tell Me Lies	Oliver	Main role
2025	Washington Black	Christopher 'Titch' Wilde	Main role
2026–present	CIA	CIA case officer Colin Glass	Main role
TBA	Second Wife †	Jacob	Pre-production

Key
†	Denotes works that have not yet been released
