= Mrs. Fletcher =

2019 American comedy miniseries

- Genre: Comedy
- Created by: Tom Perrotta
- Based on: Mrs. Fletcher by Tom Perrotta
- Starring: Kathryn Hahn; Jackson White; Owen Teague; Cameron Boyce; Domenick Lombardozzi; Katie Kershaw; Jen Richards
- Music by: Craig Wedren
- Country of origin: United States
- Original language: English
- No. of seasons: 1
- No. of episodes: 7

Production
- Executive producers: Tom Perrotta; Helen Estabrook; Nicole Holofcener; Sarah Condon
- Producers: Kathryn Hahn; Jeffrey T. Bernstein
- Cinematography: Jeffrey Waldron
- Editor: Mark Sadlek
- Camera setup: Single-camera
- Running time: 30 minutes
- Production company: Rubber Stamp

Original release
- Network: HBO
- Release: October 27 – December 8, 2019

Mrs. Fletcher is an American comedy miniseries based on the 2017 novel written by Tom Perrotta. The series stars Kathryn Hahn and was given a series order by HBO. The pilot was written by Perrotta and directed by Nicole Holofcener.

On August 16, 2019, it was announced that the series would premiere on October 27, 2019. In advance of its broadcast premiere, several episodes of the series received a preview screening in the Primetime program of the 2019 Toronto International Film Festival.

== Premise ==
Mrs. Fletcher is a coming of age story of Mrs. Eve Fletcher (Hahn) and her son Brendan (Jackson White). Eve is a divorcée and is undergoing a mid-life crisis. She decides she no longer wants to be her old self when her son Brendan goes to college as a freshman. She experiences sexual reawakening and sexual fulfillment that eluded her in her younger years by bonding with a younger man and his friends. Brendan also undergoes his own sexual troubles as he navigates the complexities of college life.

== Cast and characters ==
=== Main ===
- Kathryn Hahn as Eve Fletcher (née Mackie), a divorcee in her mid 40s with an unsatisfying job as the manager of a senior center. The departure of her son for college prompts her to undergo a sexual and personal transformation
- Jackson White as Brendan Fletcher, Eve's college-age son
- Owen Teague as Julian, Brendan's high school classmate, later a classmate in Eve's creative writing course. He and Eve develop a semi-romantic relationship
- Cameron Boyce as Zach, Brendan's college roommate
- Domenick Lombardozzi as George, Roy's adult son
- Jen Richards as Margo, a transgender woman who teaches a college-level creative writing course Eve enrolls in
- Ifádansi Rashad as Curtis, a classmate in Eve's creating writing course
- Katie Kershaw as Amanda Olney, Eve's coworker and friend

=== Recurring ===
- Casey Wilson as Jane, Eve's close friend
- Jasmine Cephas Jones as Chloe
- Bill Raymond as Roy Rafferty, an elderly resident of Eve's nursing home with a sex addiction
- Josh Hamilton as Ted Fletcher, Eve's ex-husband and Brendan's father

== Episodes ==
No.	Title	Directed by	Written by	Original release date	U.S. viewers (millions)
1	"Empty Best"	Nicole Holofcener	Tom Perrotta	October 27, 2019	0.312
Single mother and divorcee Eve Fletcher works at an assisted living facility. One resident, Roy, is caught watching porn in front of other residents, and Eve has an argument with his son George when she asks him to move Roy out of the facility. At home, Eve prepares for her son Brendan to leave for college the following day. Brendan rudely cuts their last dinner at home together short to attend a party with his friends. Eve is discouraged to learn that her ex-husband Ted will not be available to help her with Brendan's move. Her friend Jane comes over to commiserate about their children moving away and encourages her to open up to new experiences. After she drives Brendan to college, Eve begins adjusting to living alone. That night, she googles "MILF" - a term Jane earlier used to compliment her - and watches a pornographic video out of curiosity. Later, Eve arrives at a local community college after enrolling in a creative writing course and meets Julian, one of her classmates.
2	"Free Sample"	Liesl Tommy	Dana Fish	November 3, 2019	0.270
Alone for the first time in many years, Eve fills her life by spending time with her friends and goes out on a date with a new man, only to eventually reject him. She begins to rediscover sexual pleasures she had repressed throughout her marriage and struggles to decide what she really wants in life. At work, she learns that Roy exposed himself and masturbated during a film screening and finally works up the nerve to expel him from the facility. At college, Brendan begins to learn the importance of self-organization and discipline given he no longer depends on an external schedule and can no longer rely on his mother.
3	"Care Package"	Liesl Tommy	Jeremy Beiler	November 10, 2019	0.256
Eve prepares a care package for her son as she continues to experiment with masturbation and porn, but her weekend plan is wrecked by her ex-husband Ted. He informs her he’ll be spending the weekend with Brendan, and Eve is enraged that her son would choose his father over her. She goes to her creative writing class and the teacher Margo decides to finish the day by taking everyone out to a bar. Eve and her three classmates hang out and have fun drinking and sharing personal confessions. Eve gets flirty with Julian and they both dance to "I Melt with You". Eve then goes back home drunk and alone, rips up the care package, and eats the cookies she made for her son while masturbating to porn.
4	"Parents' Weekend"	Carrie Brownstein	Eric Ledgin	November 17, 2019	0.275
Eve continues to have crazy sex fantasies, and starts spending hours just watching videos of middle-aged women expressing their sexual preferences. She receives the news about Roy's death and goes with her coworker and friend Amanda to the funeral service. George blames her for his father losing the only home he had and forces her and Amanda to leave. Looking forward to a weekend with his dad, Brendan finds himself in the uncomfortable position of instead having to spend time with Tim's new wife and his stepchildren. Eve and Amanda get in a hot tub and start drinking and talking, which leads to Eve suddenly kissing Amanda on the lips. Margo and one of her students, Curtis, start to have feelings for each other.
5	"Invisible Fence"	Carrie Brownstein	Elle McLeland	November 24, 2019	0.190
Embarrassed by kissing Amanda, Eve fakes sickness to avoid going to work. Instead, she spends the day exploring her newfound sexual desires. While getting a manicure, she admits to Jane that she's been on a "dry spell" for a long time. Brendan joins Chloe in an underwear party. There, he spots his roommate Zach dancing with another guy and finds out he's gay. Margo tells Eve she feels like Curtis can't make romantic advances towards her because she's transgender. They both go to a party, and to Margo's surprise, Curtis is there too. Eve decides to have a sexual adventure; she picks up a stranger, acts confident, and they have sex.
6	"Solar Glow"	Gillian Robespierre	Kate Thulin	December 1, 2019	0.259
While talking to her son, Eve receives flirty text messages from Julian, who can't stop thinking about her. Looking energetic and refreshed for the first time in years, she drives to go see Jane. To her shock, Jane reveals that she recently discovered her husband Dave's long affair with a masseuse at a local salon. Julian keeps texting Eve, asking her out, and she finally accepts. When they meet, he opens up about his feelings for her but Eve, disturbed by the thought of dating a man decades younger than her and still reeling from the truth of Jane's marital issues, refuses to have a sexual relationship with him.
7	"Welcome Back"	Gillian Robespierre	Tom Perrotta	December 8, 2019	0.233
Eve decides to formally change her last name back to her maiden name of Mackie ten years after her divorce and throws a party with her new friends to celebrate, but not before falling and injuring her ankle. Brendan is overwhelmed at college between his bad grades and the realization that he's at fault for what happened with Chloe, and he gets a ride home. After the party, Amanda sets up a threesome with her, Eve, and Julian which Brendan walks in on. Brendan, horrified to see his mother having sex, sits on the front porch as Amanda and Julian leave. Then Eve walks out, unsure of what to say.

== Reception ==
On review aggregator Rotten Tomatoes, the series holds an approval rating of 82% based on 51 reviews. The website's critical consensus reads, "Mrs. Fletcher is an empathetic and poignant—if at times incomplete—character study that proves the perfect showcase for the luminous Kathryn Hahn." On Metacritic, it has a weighted average score of 72 out of 100, based on 20 critics, indicating "generally favorable reviews".
