= Tell Me Lies (TV series) =

2022 American drama television series

- Genre: Drama
- Created by: Meaghan Oppenheimer
- Based on: Tell Me Lies by Carola Lovering
- Showrunner: Meaghan Oppenheimer
- Starring: Grace Van Patten; Jackson White; Catherine Missal; Spencer House; Sonia Mena; Branden Cook; Benjamin Wadsworth; Alicia Crowder; Tom Ellis; Costa D'Angelo
- Composer: Jay Wadley
- Country of origin: United States
- Original language: English
- No. of seasons: 3
- No. of episodes: 26

Production
- Executive producers: Meaghan Oppenheimer; Emma Roberts; Karah Preiss; Matthew Matruski; Shannon Gibson; Samantha Schlaifer; Laura Lewis; Stephanie Noonan; Jonathan Levine; Dan Attias; Tyne Rafaeli; Mathew Hart (season 3)
- Producer: Mathew Hart (seasons 1–2)
- Cinematography: Luc Montpellier; Charles Gruet; Kat Westergaard; Sean McElwee
- Editors: Julie Cohen; Joe Leonard; Jeff Israel; Bradley Cheyne; Bridget Case; Genevieve Butler; Rebekah Fridman; Annette Davey; Gena Fridman
- Running time: 45–61 minutes
- Production companies: Moppy Productions; Belletrist Productions; Mega Mix; Rebelle Media; Refinery29; 20th Television

Original release
- Network: Hulu
- Release: September 7, 2022 – February 17, 2026

Tell Me Lies is an American drama television series created by Meaghan Oppenheimer, based on the 2018 novel of the same name by Carola Lovering. The series was released on Hulu on September 7, 2022. It stars Grace Van Patten, Jackson White, Catherine Missal, Spencer House, Sonia Mena, Branden Cook, Benjamin Wadsworth, Alicia Crowder, and Tom Ellis. The series follows a relationship between Lucy Albright and Stephen DeMarco as it unfolds over the course of eight years after meeting at college. In November 2022, the series was renewed for a second season, which premiered on September 4, 2024. In December 2024, the series was renewed for a third season which premiered on January 13, 2026. The series finale was released on February 17, 2026.

== Premise ==
Set in the late 2000s at a fictional Upstate New York school called Baird College, it chronicles the turbulent romance between college freshman Lucy Albright (Grace Van Patten) and college junior Stephen DeMarco (Jackson White) over the course of ten years.

== Cast and characters ==
=== Main ===
- Grace Van Patten as Lucy Albright, the love interest of Stephen DeMarco
- Jackson White as Stephen DeMarco, the love interest of Lucy Albright
- Catherine Missal as Bree, Lucy's best friend at Baird College
- Spencer House as Wrigley, a popular college football player who dated Pippa
- Sonia Mena as Pippa, Lucy's best friend at Baird who also dated Wrigley
- Branden Cook as Evan, Wrigley and Stephen's friend at Baird
- Benjamin Wadsworth as Drew (season 1; guest season 2)
- Alicia Crowder as Diana, Stephen's on-off college girlfriend
- Tom Ellis as Oliver (season 2; recurring season 3), Marianne's husband who is a professor at Baird and having an affair with Bree
- Costa D'Angelo as Alex (season 3), a psychology graduate student and drug dealer at Baird

=== Recurring ===
- Edmund Donovan as Max, Lucy's love interest
- Natalee Linez as Lydia Montgomery, Lucy's friend from back home
- Tyriq Withers as Tim, a friend of Wrigley, Stephen, and Evan
- Gabriella Pession as Marianne, Lucy's English professor at Baird
- Thomas Doherty as Leo (season 2), Lucy's new love interest
- Jacob Rodriguez as Chris (season 2), Lydia's younger brother who is a freshman at Baird
- Taia Sophia as Caitie (season 2–3), a student at Baird who was raped by Chris
- Katherine Hughes as Molly (season 2–3), Diana's friend who casually dates Evan
- Iris Apatow as Amanda (season 3), a new college freshman whom Oliver is sleeping with

== Production ==
=== Development ===
On September 1, 2020, it was announced that Emma Roberts had signed a first-look deal at Hulu via her production company, Belletrist TV, and her first project was adapting Carola Lovering's Tell Me Lies for television. On August 3, 2021, it was reported that Hulu had given the production a straight-to-series order. The series is created by Meaghan Oppenheimer, who is also expected to executive produce alongside Roberts, Karah Preiss, Laura Lewis, and Shannon Gibson. Production companies involved with the series are Belletrist Productions, Rebelle Media, and Vice Studios. On April 14, 2022, Jonathan Levine joined the series to direct the pilot and executive produce the series. On November 29, 2022, Hulu renewed the series for a second season. Filming for the second season began on January 17, 2024. On December 19, 2024, Hulu renewed the series for a third season. Filming for the third season took place from May 29, 2025 until August 29, 2025. On February 16, 2026, Oppenheimer announced that the series would end with the third season.

=== Casting ===
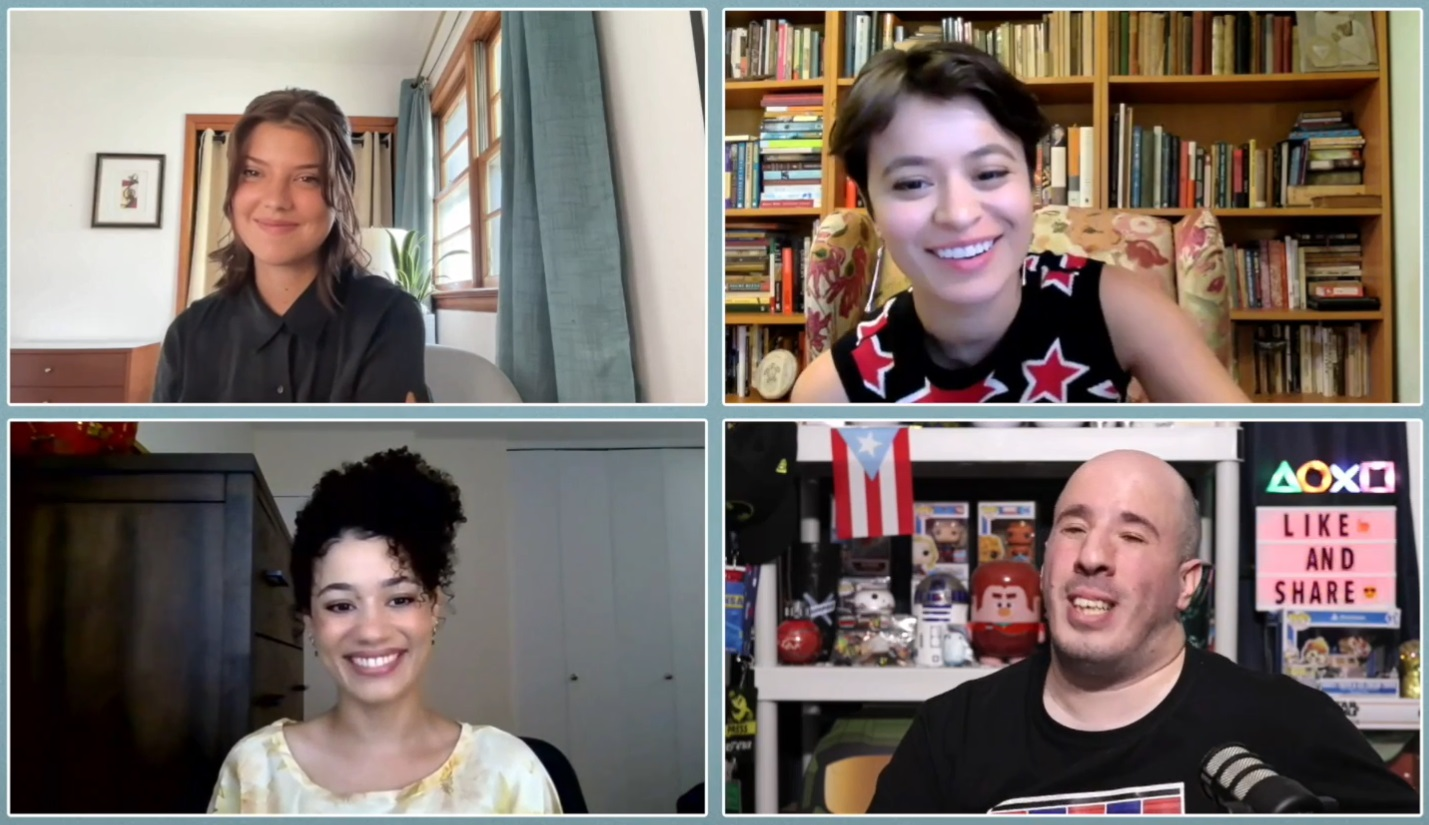
Alicia Crowder (bottom left), Catherine Missal (top left), Sonia Mena (top right), interviewed in 2022

Alongside the initial series announcement, it was reported that Grace Van Patten was cast in a lead role. On November 19, 2021, it was announced that Jackson White joined the main cast. On December 9, 2021, it was reported that Sonia Mena, Catherine Missal, and Alicia Crowder were cast as series regulars. On February 4, 2022, it was announced that Branden Cook, Spencer House, and Benjamin Wadsworth joined the cast in starring roles. On April 14, 2022, Gabriella Pession, Edmund Donovan, and Natalee Linez joined the series in recurring capacities. On January 24, 2024, Tom Ellis was cast as a new series regular for the second season. On February 14, 2024, Thomas Doherty joined the cast in a recurring role for the second season. On March 5, 2024, Jacob Rodriguez and Katherine Hughes were cast in recurring capacities for the second season. On May 9, 2025, Costa D'Angelo joined the cast as a new series regular for the third season. On June 9, 2025, Iris Apatow was cast in a recurring role for the third season.

=== Music ===
For the season 3 soundtrack, Chvrches covered The Postal Service's "Such Great Heights" and Robert Palmer's "Addicted To Love". Fastball's 1998 single "The Way" was also featured in the season, playing in the fifth episode during a scene between two characters.

== Episodes ==
=== Series overview ===
Season	Episodes	Originally released	
Season	Episodes	First released	Last released
1	10	September 7, 2022	October 26, 2022
2	8	September 4, 2024	October 16, 2024
3	8	January 13, 2026	February 17, 2026

=== Season 1 (2022) ===
No. overall	No. in season	Title	Directed by	Written by	Original release date	Prod. code
1	1	"Lightning Strikes"	Jonathan Levine	Meaghan Oppenheimer	September 7, 2022	1HMK01
In 2015, Lucy attends a college friend's wedding and braces herself for seeing Stephen again, sparking memories of how they first met eight years earlier. Flashbacks reveal Lucy's rocky start at college—strained family ties, meeting her new friends, and her complicated first encounters with Stephen. Tragedy soon strikes when her roommate Macy dies in a car accident after a party, leaving the group shaken and Lucy reeling.
2	2	"Hot-Blooded"	Erin Feeley	Samir Mehta	September 7, 2022	1HMK02
The fallout from Macy's death weighs heavily on the friend group, with secrets and guilt starting to surface. Lucy struggles with grief and her uneasy role in comforting Macy's parents, while Stephen juggles complicated ties to both Lucy and Diana. Attraction, jealousy, and hidden truths collide, leading Lucy and Stephen into a passionate turning point in their relationship.
3	3	"We Don't Touch, We Collide"	Erin Feeley	Mona Mira	September 7, 2022	1HMK03
Wrigley battles a knee injury and academic struggles, reluctantly seeking help for both while trying to support a withdrawn Drew. Stephen and Diana impress academically, but only Diana secures a research assistant spot, fueling tension between them that erupts into a toxic sexual encounter. Meanwhile, Lucy's trust in Stephen falters after finding another girl's hair tie, and her jealousy deepens when she sees Diana's video. At parties, relationships fray—Drew spirals into drunken self-destruction, Wrigley reveals secrets, and Lucy escapes with new acquaintance Max. As Diana privately reopens the door to Stephen, he's left conflicted, haunted by past loves and memories of Macy.
4	4	"Take Off Your Pants and Jacket"	Sam Boyd	Sinead Daly	September 14, 2022	1HMK04
This episode shifts focus to Bree, who navigates her first sexual experiences with Tim—leaving her uncertain and disappointed—while also exploring her curiosity through posing in art class and watching porn. Her friendship with Lucy remains supportive but tinged with self-doubt as Lucy gushes about her electric bond with Stephen. Meanwhile, Stephen lies about his whereabouts to Lucy while secretly staying with Diana, and his arrogance costs him a prestigious law firm internship after bombing the interview. Drew attempts to reconcile with Bree, but she harshly dismisses him. The girls attend one of Diana's parties as tensions and insecurities deepen across the group.
5	5	"Merry F*cking Christmas"	Sam Boyd	Chisa Hutchinson	September 21, 2022	1HMK05
Lucy goes home for the holidays, clashing with her mother CJ over old wounds, James's unwanted appearance, and buried family secrets. She learns CJ had been having an affair, while her relationship with Max unravels after a fight about her dishonesty and emotional baggage. Meanwhile, Stephen returns to his tense family dynamic with his manipulative mother Nora and caring sister Sadie, who considers leaving for boarding school. At Macy's memorial, Lucy discovers a drawing in Macy's room that proves Stephen once dated Macy—something he never told her. Diana, high with Stephen, admits to sleeping with Wrigley, sparking his anger, while Stephen's fraught bond with Nora worsens.
6	6	"And I'm Sorry If I Dissed You"	Isabel Sandoval	Meaghan Oppenheimer	September 28, 2022	1HMK06
Back at Baird after the holidays, both Stephen and Lucy wrestle with secrets—Stephen over Diana and Wrigley, and Lucy after learning of his past with Macy. Their tension peaks when Lucy confronts him, prompting Stephen to spin a false confession about being with Macy the night she died. Though manipulative, it wins back Lucy's trust, straining her friendships when Pippa warns her about Stephen's lies. Meanwhile, Evan quietly vies for Lucy's attention, while Stephen grows increasingly controlling—publicly claiming Lucy, cutting ties with Diana, and pressuring Wrigley for leverage. By the end, Stephen reveals to Pippa that he lied to Lucy about Macy, cementing his darker, manipulative side.
7	7	"Castle on a Cloud"	Isabel Sandoval	Bill Kennedy	October 5, 2022	1HMK07
The group heads to Evan's lake house for his birthday, though he's left to do all the planning himself. Tensions run high—Wrigley's drug-fueled antics cause chaos, Lucy pressures Stephen about going to the police over Macy, and Stephen manipulates both Drew and Wrigley to cover his tracks. During the "Canoe Olympics," Stephen betrays Wrigley's trust by exposing secrets, deepening rifts between the brothers. Evan finally explodes, furious at his so-called friends, and bonds with Bree in the aftermath, leading to their first hookup. Meanwhile, Stephen cruelly sabotages Bree's camera, signaling he still won't openly acknowledge Lucy, pulling their relationship back into uncertainty.
8	8	"Don't Go Wasting Your Emotion"	Ed Lilly	Samir Mehta	October 12, 2022	1HMK08
This chapter spotlights Pippa's backstory and insecurities. Once seemingly confident, she reveals her history of bullying, loneliness, and fabricating a "cool" persona to fit in. Her growing bond with Charlie exposes her vulnerability, though she still clings to Wrigley for validation. Meanwhile, Lucy continues to feel manipulated by Stephen but flips the power dynamic, pushing him for honesty while secretly protecting him by not exposing his role in Macy's death. Stephen juggles family issues, Diana's advances, and his manipulation of Drew—pitting him against both Wrigley and Pippa. As tensions explode at Wrigley's captainship party, Lucy sides with Stephen over Pippa, blind to his deceit. By episode's end, Lucy anonymously tips the Dean to investigate Drew and Wrigley about Macy's accident, signaling a dangerous escalation.
9	9	"Sugar, We're Going Down Swinging"	Ed Lilly	Sinead Daly	October 19, 2022	1HMK09
Lucy's anonymous letter triggers an investigation into Drew, pushing him further into anxiety and conflict. Meanwhile, Stephen and Lucy's relationship reaches new intimacy and trust, though Lucy faces exposure for plagiarizing her seminar story. With Stephen's encouragement, she leans on her mother, CJ, for proof, leading to an uneasy reconciliation. At a party, Drew drunkenly accuses Wrigley of betrayal, sparking a fight that leaves Wrigley seriously injured and his football future uncertain. Pippa is unfairly blamed, straining her romance with Wrigley. Wracked with guilt, Stephen revisits the site of Macy's crash and shares a vulnerable moment with Lucy. In a major turning point, the two finally confess their love for each other.
10	10	"The Bedrooms of Our Friends"	Robin Wright	Meaghan Oppenheimer	October 26, 2022	1HMK10
On move-in day, Macy hooks up with Stephen but soon feels discarded when he openly flirts with Lucy. After a tense night out, an intoxicated Stephen drives Macy home, where she confronts him about his dishonesty, and the vehicle crashes. Macy is immediately killed in the crash, though Stephen appears to be unharmed. Stephen abandons her, staging the scene to make her look responsible. In the present, finals are over, Wrigley's football career ends due to injury, and Bree deepens her relationship with Evan. Pippa and Lucy remain strained, while Stephen feels increasingly insecure about his future and resentful of Lucy's support. At a Hawaiian party, Diana subtly manipulates Stephen into believing Lucy is holding him back. In a shocking betrayal, Stephen leaves hand-in-hand with Diana, breaking Lucy's heart without a word. That night, a devastated Lucy drinks with Evan, and they wake up in bed together. The story flashes forward to the wedding scene teased in episode one: Lucy reunites with Stephen, who is now engaged—not to Diana, but to Lydia, Lucy's best friend.

=== Season 2 (2024) ===
No. overall	No. in season	Title	Directed by	Written by	Original release date	Prod. code
11	1	"You Got a Reaction, Didn't You?"	Dan Attias	Meaghan Oppenheimer	September 4, 2024	2HMK01
At Bree and Evan's engagement party, where tensions surface between Lucy, Stephen, and Lydia (now Stephen's fiancée and Lucy's former best friend). Lydia makes it clear she still resents Lucy for a betrayal of some kind. Flashback to 2008, Lucy returns to campus after a summer with Lydia and meets Lydia's brother, Chris, who is also starting at Baird. Bree, Lucy, and Pippa reconnect, while Stephen flaunts a new iPhone gifted by Diana's father, sparking jealousy and unease. At a party, Lucy struggles with Stephen's presence, secretly reconnects with Evan about their hookup, and has awkward encounters with both Stephen and Diana. Meanwhile, Bree begins pushing boundaries, manipulating the administration for her classes and forming a connection with Professor Oliver. Lucy later suffers an emotional breakdown in class but finds comfort when Professor Marianne offers her a transcription project for extra credit. Meanwhile, Stephen grows jealous when Lucy talks to Leo, and their rivalry resurfaces. Their confrontation ends with Lucy smashing Stephen's phone and warning him not to bring up Macy's death or the anonymous letter again. Lucy leaves Bree's engagement party alone, while Pippa departs to meet her girlfriend—revealed to be Diana.
12	2	"I Shall Now Perform a 180 Flip-Flop"	Tyne Rafaeli	Matthew-Lee Erlbach	September 4, 2024	2HMK02
At Bree's birthday dinner Evan gifts her expensive earrings, sparking tension between them, while Lucy and Pippa meet Leo and exchange numbers. Bree later confides in Professor Oliver, sharing a moment of connection. Evan admits to Stephen that he cheated on Bree, and Stephen urges him to confess. Meanwhile, Lucy begins dating Leo and shares her first kiss with him. Evan eventually tells Bree about the cheating but hides that it was with Lucy. Bree is furious, feeling manipulated, and leans further toward Oliver for comfort, though their connection doesn't fully cross the line—yet. At a party, Pippa drinks heavily and ends up in a questionable situation with Chris. Diana intervenes and later warns Lucy, who confronts Pippa the next day. Pippa has no memory of the night and angrily asks Lucy not to tell Bree. This secret begins to strain their friendship. Elsewhere, Wrigley struggles with losing football due to injury, while Stephen quietly manipulates his friends. Bree, conflicted but still tied to Evan, sleeps with him after nearly kissing Oliver. The episode ends with several turning points: Lucy discovering Stephen is now a TA in her class. Bree giving in to her attraction and kissing Oliver. Pippa secretly washes her party clothes, disturbed by what happened with Chris.
13	3	"I Can See Right Through Myself"	Tyne Rafaeli	Mona Mira	September 11, 2024	2HMK03
Present day: Lucy tries to appear unaffected by Stephen but grows tense when her boyfriend Max interacts with him. Pippa avoids Wrigley, later confiding in Diana that she wished Diana had been there for her. Flashback to 2008: Lucy & Stephen – Stephen toys with Lucy in class, pointing out flaws in her essay to unsettle her. Later, he corners her in her dorm, insisting she still has feelings for him. Lucy resists, then shocks Diana by revealing Stephen let Macy die in the crash. Diana refuses to believe her. Lucy distances herself, and drops his class. Bree & Oliver – Bree deepens her secret relationship with Professor Oliver, even agreeing to an affair. Though Oliver hesitates, they ultimately hook up at a friend's apartment. Pippa – Struggling after Chris and the party incident, she clashes with Wrigley and defends herself against his teammates' taunts. Wrigley later apologizes. Lucy presses Pippa about Chris, but Pippa refuses to talk. Evan & Bree – Evan admits their breakup to friends, while Bree keeps her Oliver connection private. Lucy & Leo – Their relationship grows, with Lucy cautiously opening up about Stephen's effect on her. Leo promises to treat her well, despite concerns about his temper. Diana, shaken after Lucy's accusations, seeks comfort by initiating sex with Stephen desperate to cling to him despite her doubts.
14	4	"Just Stable Children"	Eva Vives	Bill Kennedy	September 18, 2024	2HMK04
Stephen, Wrigley, and Evan nearly crash while driving, rattling Stephen just before his LSATs. Diana comforts him, though he brushes it off, later confessing that cheating on her was his "biggest mistake." Meanwhile, Lucy deepens her relationship with Leo, while Bree continues her affair with Professor Oliver, who plants doubts about her relationship with Evan by suggesting her friends pushed him into it. Elsewhere, Pippa lies to her father about still dating Wrigley, and Wrigley plays along. Afterward, the exes have an awkward but open conversation about their breakup. At a party, Lucy and Leo's budding romance hits turbulence when her jealousy surfaces, tied to her unresolved trauma with Stephen. They argue but reconcile the next day and sleep together for the first time. Evan struggles with Bree ignoring him, he goes out with Wrigley and hangs out with one of Diana's friends. Bree confesses her affair with Oliver to Lucy, who reluctantly agrees to keep her secret. During the LSAT, Stephen has a panic attack. At the hospital, Diana learns he has a fractured rib consistent with hitting a steering wheel—fueling suspicions about Macy's crash. Later, snooping through Stephen's laptop, she discovers compromising photos with Macy and realizes Lucy's story may be true. Diana quietly deletes the evidence but says nothing.
15	5	"Evil, Ornery, Scandalous, and Evil"	Eva Vives	Nicki Renna	September 25, 2024	2HMK05
Diana struggles to keep her emotions in check on Halloween, briefly bonding with Pippa, who feels a surprising attraction toward her. Lucy tries to repair her GPA with Marianne's help while also growing suspicious of Bree, who secretly goes on a hotel getaway with Oliver. Their date turns messy when Oliver kisses Bree in front of a bartender to prove a point, leaving her embarrassed. At the Halloween party, multiple tensions surface: Diana feels out of place with Stephen and his sister Sadie, Pippa is uneasy around Chris, and Lydia confronts Stephen on Lucy's behalf. Lucy later defends herself against Sadie's accusations of stalking Stephen, impressing Lydia. Meanwhile, Pippa and Wrigley reconnect platonically, sharing brutally honest confessions and choosing to spend the night as friends. The next day, shocking news spreads: Chris is accused of raping one of Diana's sorority sisters. Lydia instinctively defends him, while Lucy sides with the alleged victim, creating friction between the two friends. Stephen and Diana clash over her poor LSAT performance, and Wrigley warns Stephen to back off when he gets possessive. Stephen spirals—sending Lucy a menacing voicemail, which terrifies her and horrifies Sadie, who ultimately leaves after witnessing his darker side. Elsewhere, Bree deepens her entanglement with Oliver despite mounting red flags, and Lucy finds comfort in Leo. Diana visits Pippa, helping her bleach her hair, and delicately shifting focus when the subject of Chris' victim arises—hinting at Pippa's inner turmoil.
16	6	"Do Your Dirty Words Come Out to Play?"	Ed Lilly	Allison P. Davis	October 2, 2024	2HMK06
At Evan and Bree's rehearsal dinner in the present day, tensions swirl beneath the celebrations. Lucy sneaks off to hook up with Max, deliberately luring Stephen to catch her, while flashbacks reveal a messy Thanksgiving drama. In the past, Bree pursues her secret romance with Oliver, even as Evan tries to win her back with a "Friendsgiving" gathering. Lucy reluctantly attends with Leo, only to be ambushed by Stephen's presence. Awkward games and pointed confrontations escalate until Stephen exposes that Lucy's boyfriend Leo was cheated on by his ex—with Stephen himself. The revelation shatters Lucy's trust, and her attempt to confront Leo about his anger issues backfires when he confesses his abusive family past. Leo ends things with Lucy accusing her of using his trauma against him. Meanwhile, Bree confirms to Evan that she's dating an older man, sparking a painful fight, while Pippa grows closer to Diana even as Wrigley lingers in her orbit. The night ends in fractures: Lucy sobbing to Bree over her breakup, Diana and Pippa spend the night texting each other. The next morning, Stephen rationalizes his behavior to Evan, Oliver charms Bree over the phone, and Lucy, drained, begs Stephen to stop their toxic war.
17	7	"I'm Not Drowning Fast Enough"	Ed Lilly	Victoria Bata	October 9, 2024	2HMK07
Stephen struggles with nightmares and growing tension with Diana, while Pippa secretly reconnects with Wrigley and opens up about her sexuality. Bree deepens her dangerous affair with Oliver, leaving incriminating evidence at Marianne's Christmas party, which Lucy witnesses in disgust. Lucy clashes with Bree over Oliver and later shocks everyone by publicly lying that Chris also assaulted her, using Pippa's buried trauma to push accountability. This devastates Pippa, straining their friendship and drawing Lydia's fury. Wrigley breaks down over his mistakes, leaning on Pippa for comfort. Diana tries to salvage her relationship with Stephen, but he lashes out, unnerving her. Ultimately, Stephen declares his enduring love to Lucy, while Marianne is shown wearing Bree's earring, raising the stakes of the affair.
18	8	"Don't Struggle Like That, Or I Will Only Love You More"	Dan Attias	Meaghan Oppenheimer	October 16, 2024	2HMK08
In 2015, Max realizes Lucy told Stephen to watch them have sex and breaks up with her. Stephen and Lucy have sex the next morning. In 2008, Lucy spends the night with Stephen, but freaks out the morning after and later confesses her love to Leo and they have sex and reunite. Stephen breaks up with Diana, who calls him out on his sociopathic tendencies. It is also revealed that Diana aced her LSATs, and that her wanting to take time off was a ruse to prove that Stephen was only ever interested in Diana when she was of use to him. Drew comes to visit Wrigley and they make up and spend the night out drinking. At the bar, Wrigley calls Pippa and confesses his love for her while apologizing. Bree tells Oliver she wants a relationship with him and he ends things with her, feeling she is getting too attached. At a Christmas Party, Stephen is upset to see Lucy with Leo, so he incites Leo by bragging that they had sex that same day. Leo beats Stephen repeatedly, while Stephen refuses to fight back to manipulate Lucy. The next morning, Wrigley wakes up to find Drew dead, having taken too many of Wrigley's pills. Bree goes to Oliver's house and tells him she really just wants a physical relationship now and they have sex. After, Bree is horrified when Marianne finds them. Marianne is not surprised, revealing she and Oliver have an open relationship and she has known about her the entire semester and that she and Oliver planned the affair. Bree, Lucy, and Pippa retaliate by destroying Oliver's car. Evan confesses to Steven that he slept with Lucy, which Stephen records. In 2015, at Bree and Evan's wedding, right before Bree walks down the aisle, Stephen sends her the recording.

=== Season 3 (2026) ===
No. overall	No. in season	Title	Directed by	Written by	Original release date	Prod. code
19	1	"You F*cked It, Friend"	Tyne Rafaeli	Meaghan Oppenheimer	January 13, 2026	3HMK01
In 2015, Bree quickly excuses herself from the wedding and Lucy follows her. All Bree can say is that she is a horrible person. Back at Baird for the spring semester, Lucy and Stephen promise things will be different. Wrigley struggles adjusting to life following Drew's death, he and Pippa have spent break together with Pippa taking care of him. The group attends a party back on campus where they take molly from a drug dealer who Bree finds familiar. Everyone takes the drug except Pippa, who goes home, and Stephen. Stephen tries to get Lucy to confess something juicy to him, but she genuinely offers up nothing. Wrigley walks Bree home and the two share a moment, with Wrigley feeling like he lost his entire family due to his parents blaming him for Drew's death. Bree tells him maybe things won't get better and she shares that she didn't know her father and her mother had her really young. The next day, they wake up together on a bus bench and vow not to tell anyone. Pippa is angry with Diana for constantly judging her and her friends and she says she shouldn't care that much about her. Evan struggles with plans for post grad. Lucy is called to the dean's office, wanting to know about her accusation that Chris raped her. She denies everything and says she will not take it further. Later, Stephen is furious with Lucy and he reveals he knows she and Evan slept together. In 2015, Bree refuses to tell Lucy what she feels guilty about. The wedding takes place, Bree confidently walks down the aisle, eying Stephen, and she and Evan get married.
20	2	"We Can't Help It If We Are a Problem"	Ed Lilly	Flora Birnbaum	January 13, 2026	3HMK02
Lucy and Stephen agree to go out with the group to a karaoke bar in an attempt to keep things normal, but their dynamic quickly deteriorates. At the club, Stephen’s insecurity flares when Evan shows up with Molly. He humiliates Lucy by leaving her alone onstage after she invites him to sing with her. Bree jumps in and performs with her to salvage the moment, but Stephen storms off in a jealous mood. Lucy pleads with him not to sabotage everything, confessing she fears losing both him and Bree. Later that night, Stephen gives Lucy an ultimatum: if she tells Bree that she slept with Evan, they can stay together. Lucy stands up to him and tells him she won’t let him control her by using secrets as leverage. When Stephen threatens to tell Bree himself, Lucy boldly predicts he won’t because he would no longer have the secret to control her. Later Lucy has a panic attack after having a conversation with Bree about fear of being hurt. Unable to calm herself Pippa calls Alex, a grad student and drug dealer who brings anxiety medication to help Lucy settle down. He uses a tapping technique to help calm her down which Bree recognizes. It’s revealed that Alex is someone Bree knows from her time in the foster care system. At the karaoke bar Bree notices the same girl she saw leaving Oliver's office earlier in the day and strikes up a conversation with her. Initially Bree is relieved to hear Amanda has a long-distance boyfriend; but finds out later that Amanda’s boyfriend broke up with her because she cheated with an older man. The next day on campus, Evan notices Bree’s nervous reaction when Oliver walks by, leading him to confront the professor directly — though Oliver gaslights him, denying wrongdoing. Diana reaches out to Pippa and after a frank conversation about their feelings for each other, they share a passionate kiss. Later Wrigley bonds with Bree at photography class.
21	3	"Repent"	Ed Lilly	Mona Mira	January 13, 2026	3HMK03
Pippa and Diana find themselves feeling awkward after their kiss after spending the night together fully clothed, with Pippa still wanting to stay with Wrigley. The gang attends a Ski party where Lucy tries to talk to Alex, who is blunt, a little rude, and off-putting. Alex says he has no time for relationships but asks Lucy if she wanted to have sex with him. Evan attends the party with Molly but tells Bree he'd break up her so that they can get back together. Stephen begins to spiral when he finds out from his mother that Sadie doesn't want to talk to him and that she is now on a partial scholarship due to failing grades. He asks his mother if he can come home and she tells him no. While at a bar he speaks with Max, Lucy's ex-boyfriend. Lucy and Alex go to his place and start make out, but she stops when she feels that he's not giving her his full attention. Stephen calls Bree but Lucy tells her not to answer the phone and leaves to confront Stephen. She begs him not to tell Bree anything, but he says that he has to hurt her. She threatens to tell everyone about Macy, but he tells her that no one will believe her. Lucy decides to give him another secret he can use against her. Stephen makes Lucy record a video, saying that she lied about being raped for attention. Stephen and Evan decide to bury the hatchet when he offers to pay Sadie's tuition. He then asks for his key to his apartment back. Bree tells Amanda to end her relationship with Oliver, and that it isn't right. Diana takes a pregnancy test and the result is positive. Lucy goes to Alex's apartment and has sex with him while he verbally degrades her at her request.
22	4	"Fix Me Up, Girl"	Tyne Rafaeli	Liz Elverenli	January 20, 2026	3HMK04
Diana makes the decision to have an abortion. However, her choice doesn’t stay private for long. When Stephen confronts Diana, he tries to argue against her choice and insists she should consider having the baby to fix her troubled relationship with her father. Lucy meets Alex for a drink and spots her ex-boyfriend Max out on a date. She tells Alex how she disregarded his feelings for her and he convinces her to apologize for being uncaring in their relationship. Lucy and Alex then have rough sex in the car. Lucy is summoned to the Dean’s office as they continue to investigate Caitie's claim that Chris assaulted her. Lucy says that she wants to avoid further drama and does not have anything to add. Marianne tries to offer comfort but Lucy snaps at her. Lucy asks Diana for advice and admits she told Stephen about the situation, and he forced her to admit to it on tape. Diana and Pippa have sex for the first time. In 2015, at the wedding reception Bree and Wrigley share prolonged longing glances across the dance floor. Stephen notices their interactions and grabs Wrigley’s phone and discovers numerous calls between Wrigley and Bree. It is revealed Pippa knows Wrigley is still in love with Bree, and it has all been an act.
23	5	"I'd Like to Hold Her Head Underwater"	Tyne Rafaeli	Victoria Bata	January 27, 2026	3HMK05
Stephen celebrating his acceptance into Yale Law School and boasts about to his friends and anyone who’ll listen. Lucy reconnects with Alex, but when he tries to shift to slower, more caring intimacy after learning of her "assault" she resists. Back at her dorm she finds the bucket of urine that was left outside her door. At a charity pool party Pippa tells Lucy that Caitie a bucket of urine was left outside Caitie's room and asks her if she's getting harassed as well. Lucy tells her no but later she's accosted by Chris. At the pool, Stephen flirts with a girl he met earlier named Teagan and Evan is cold towards Molly when she tries to speak with him. Bree and Wrigley take a road trip to New Jersey to visit with her estranged mother Mary. After the visit Bree and Wrigley talk on the drive back. She reveals she never learned how to swim because of the instability in her childhood. Wrigley stops at a pool and tries to teach her how to float and swim which leads to an almost kiss. The next morning Bree chooses to bury the moment by announcing that she and Evan are back together to Pippa and Wrigley. Meanwhile, Stephen tries to brag to Diana that he has been accepted into Yale law School, she says that she did as well and that she aced her LSAT's and only lied to get away from him. She goes on to tell Stephen that she will not be attending Yale and will go somewhere else. Later Stephen sifts through intimate photos of Diana and begins attaching them to an email. Back in her room, Lucy plays an old voicemail where Stephen tells her horrible things and masturbates.
24	6	"I Don't Cry When I'm Sad Anymore"	Larysa Kondracki	Leo Richardson	February 3, 2026	3HMK06
Pippa and Wrigley are distant with each other. Diana’s Valentine’s bliss collapses when her mother calls, furious that intimate photos of her were anonymously sent to her father. Stephen arrives at an Anti-Valentine's party with a freshman named Tegan, and Bree brings Alex to support Lucy. Alex immediately senses Lucy’s discomfort around Stephen, but Lucy refuses to admit she’s afraid of him. Bree tries to make amends with freshman Amanda, only to learn Amanda is 17, making her prior romance with much older Oliver illegal. Later, Bree tells Evan that her mother Mary is attending her photography exhibit, but Evan is not in support of it. To lighten the mood, Tegan organizes a drinking game where each player writes own awkward reveals and barbs, but the game turns sour when Bree names Wrigley as the most likely person to commit suicide. Bree tries to apologize but Wrigley frustrated insists she confide in Evan, not him. Lucy and Alex leave the party for drinks and at the local bar she drunkenly expresses lingering feelings for Max before Alex takes her back to his place where they have sex. Lucy drunkenly heads out, intending to go home but mistakenly tries to enter Stephen’s dorm door. She runs into Diana and confides in her that she feels like she’s “sleepwalking through life” trapped between anxiety, fear, and unresolved trauma with Stephen. Diana advises her not to let Stephen continue to have power over her by refusing to react to him. Meanwhile, Bree attempts to talk with Evan about her mother, but the conversation devolves into an argument. Evan asks Wrigley to walk Bree home, leaving them alone in the street. Bree vents to Wrigley about being misunderstood, and he expresses his long-held frustration with group. Bree then visits Marianne, who gives her sobering advice: “It’s better to be with someone who loves you a little more than you love them.” That sentiment foreshadows future choices, including Bree’s eventual decision to marry Evan despite her feelings for Wrigley. The next morning, Bree reaches out to Wrigley, admitting he makes things better and that her feelings are confusing. They share a heartfelt hug and a kiss.
25	7	"As I Climb Onto Your Back, I Will Promise Not to Sting"	Larysa Kondracki	Teleplay by : Liz Elverenli & Diana Glogau; Story by : Meaghan Oppenheimer & Diana Glogau	February 10, 2026	3HMK07
Bree and Wrigley confess their feelings genuinely and agree they should break up with their partners. Evan seeks advice from Oliver of how to get Bree to do what he wants. He offers to pick up Bree’s mother from the train station but takes her to a bar first for a drink. Mary who struggles with alcoholism arrives drunk and embarrasses Bree at her event. Meanwhile, Wrigley breaks up with Pippa but she's blindsided as she did not see it coming. A distressed Lucy begs Stephen to see the video and after showing it to her he gives her he gives her the tape claiming he didn't make any copies. Lucy’s mental state and anxiety has deteriorated so much that gives the same warning to freshman Tegan that she already gave the day before, While Bree wrestles with the chaos caused by her mom and Pippa and Wrigley sleeping together, she retreats to Evan’s place. While Evan is showering, she sees a Facebook photo from the Hawaiian party and sees Evan and Lucy were together in the background of that photo.
26	8	"Are You Happy Now, That I'm on My Knees?"	Tyne Rafaeli	Meaghan Oppenheimer	February 17, 2026	3HMK08
The episode opens in 2015 at Bree and Evan's wedding with Bree smoking outside. She accidentally gets caught by Wrigley who was staying over at Evan's house. The two argue over how their brief relationship ended with Wrigley expressing his frustration over how they haven't spoken to one another in six years. The episode flashes back to 2009 where Lucy unexpectedly runs into Diana. Lucy tells Diana that Stephen gave her the tape. Diana also shares that Stephen was accepted to Yale and that she's decided to go to Stanford to put distance between them. Bree is confronted by Marianne, Oliver and Amanda who threaten to report her for her "false" accusations against Oliver. To make matters worse, Mary sides against Bree, telling her to stop harassing Oliver and Marianne. At the Yale banquet, Lucy tries to warn the Yale representative that Stephen is dangerous and shouldn't be allowed to attend Yale, but to no avail. Pippa finally confesses cheating on Wrigley, but this restores their friendship. In English class, Lucy sees her classmates watching her confession video and finds out that it was leaked to the school. The Dean expels Lucy. Lucy confronts Stephen, but he is not the one who leaked the video. Later, Stephen receives a call from Yale saying that his acceptance has been revoked due to his inappropriate behavior. Bree reveals to Evan that she knows about his night with Lucy, and decides to forgive him. Flash forward to 2015, Lucy and Bree joyously dance at Bree's wedding reception. As the wedding comes to a close, Stephen, having felt like he's lost, makes a final attempt to ruin the evening. He reveals to Lydia that their relationship was for the purpose of making Lucy jealous. He then takes the mic from the emcee to reveal everyone's secrets. He reveals Evan's cheating, Bree's cheating, and who truly leaked Lucy's tape. Chaos erupts, with Bree and Evan each attacking Stephen, Bree trying to explain herself to Lucy, and later Evan confronting Wrigley. Diana and Pippa, the only ones not involved in the confessions, happily leave together, putting the drama behind them. Lucy finds Stephen waiting for her outside the hotel and leaves with him, despite saying she hates him. In the final scene, Stephen and Lucy stop by a gas station where Lucy goes inside to get them coffees. When she comes back out, she sees that Stephen has abandoned her there, leaving just her purse behind. She smiles.

== Release ==
Tell Me Lies premiered on Hulu on September 7, 2022. Internationally, the series was released on Disney+. The second season premiered on September 4, 2024, with two new episodes and the rest debuting on a weekly basis. The third season premiered on January 13, 2026, with three new episodes, with the remaining episodes being debuted on a weekly basis.

== Reception ==
=== Viewership ===
Whip Media's viewership tracking app, TV Time, which tracks viewership data for the more than 25 million worldwide users of its TV Time app, reported that Tell Me Lies ranked among the top ten most-streamed original series in the United States from the week ending September 8 to the week ending October 20, 2024. TVision, which utilizes its TVision Power Score to evaluate CTV programming performance by factoring in viewership and engagement across over 1,000 apps and incorporating four key metrics—viewer attention time, total program time available for the season, program reach, and app reach—announced that Tell Me Lies was in the top fifteen of the most-streamed series in the United States for the week of September 2–8. It remained in the top twenty from September 23 to October 20. Tell Me Lies remained in Hulu's "Top 15 Today"—a daily updated list of the platform's most-watched titles—for over 50 consecutive days throughout and following its Season 2 run.

The Tell Me Lies Season 3 premiere generated 5 million views globally across Disney+ and Hulu within its first seven days of streaming, representing a 150% increase compared to the Season 1 premiere over the same period. Nielsen Media Research, which records streaming viewership on certain U.S. television screens, reported that Tell Me Lies generated 391 million minutes of watch time from January 12—18, ranking as the eighth most-streamed original series during that week. The Season 3 finale drew more than 3.5 million views in its first day on Disney+ and Hulu, an increase of nearly 70% over the premiere's same-day audience.

=== Critical response ===
The review aggregator website Rotten Tomatoes reported a 75% approval rating based on 12 critic reviews. Metacritic, which uses a weighted average, assigned a score of 65 out of 100 based on 8 critics, indicating "generally favorable reviews".

Angie Han of The Hollywood Reporter said Tell Me Lies works effectively through its nuanced portrayal of the toxic relationship between Lucy and Stephen. Han found that the show's deliberate ambiguity about Stephen's character enhances the psychological depth, setting it apart from typical romance dramas. Han stated that the series captures the era's hookup culture with insight and nostalgia. Despite some slow-moving subplots, she noted that the performances and sharp realism create a compelling blend of guilty pleasure and reflective drama. Steve Greene of IndieWire gave Tell Me Lies a B grade, noting that the series straddles a middle ground between idealizing and mortifying college life. Greene found the series' portrayal of the characters' passionate yet toxic relationship compelling but felt that its focus on a tight-knit friend group sometimes limited its broader depiction of college life. Greene praised the performances, especially the nuanced portrayal of Stephen as an enigmatic figure, and appreciated the show's slow-burn approach to developing its central drama. However, he noted that the show's contained narrative and tidy presentation somewhat hinder its potential for greatness.

Elizabeth Logan of Glamour described Tell Me Lies as a drama with appealing visuals and a complex web of secrets, reminiscent of Big Little Lies but with a slower, more frustrating pace. While the show offers intriguing subplots and strong performances, particularly from Jackson White and Katey Sagal, Logan said it struggles with drawn-out revelations and a disconnect between its dramatic elements and realistic portrayal of college life. Logan found the show engaging yet uneven, hoping it will improve in a potential second season with better pacing and sharper dialogue. Katherine Smith of Paste rated Tell Me Lies seven out of ten and said that the show features some positive elements, such as Catherine Missal's nuanced performance, which adds emotional depth and authenticity. Smith also found that the melodramatic subplots offer moments of engagement. However, she stated that the show falls short of transcending typical college romance and melodrama tropes, with its focus on the destructive and eroticized relationship between Lucy and Stephan lacking meaningful insight into toxic relationships.

The third season has a 100% approval rating on review aggregator Rotten Tomatoes based on 6 critic reviews.

=== Accolades ===
The series was one of 200 television series that received the ReFrame Stamp for the years 2022 to 2023. The stamp is awarded by the gender equity coalition ReFrame and industry database IMDbPro for film and television projects that are proven to have gender-balanced hiring, with stamps being awarded to projects that hire female-identifying people, especially women of color, in four out of eight key roles for their production.
