= Players (2024 film) =

American film by Trish Sie

- Release poster
- Directed by: Trish Sie
- Written by: Whit Anderson
- Produced by: Ross M. Dinerstein; Marc Platt; Adam Siegel; Ryan Christians
- Starring: Gina Rodriguez; Damon Wayans Jr.; Joel Courtney; Augustus Prew; Liza Koshy; Ego Nwodim; Marin Hinkle; Tom Ellis
- Cinematography: Matthew Clark
- Edited by: Kathryn Himoff
- Music by: Jeff Cardoni
- Production companies: Marc Platt Productions; Campfire Studios
- Distributed by: Netflix
- Release date: February 14, 2024
- Running time: 105 minutes
- Country: United States
- Language: English

Players is a 2024 American romantic comedy film directed by Trish Sie and written by Whit Anderson. It stars Gina Rodriguez, Damon Wayans Jr., Joel Courtney, Augustus Prew, Liza Koshy, Ego Nwodim, Marin Hinkle, and Tom Ellis. It was released by Netflix on February 14, 2024.

== Plot ==
Mack is a 33-year-old sports journalist in New York City who is known for her ‘plays’, complex deceptions to find hook-ups for herself and her friends - best friend Adam, co-worker Brannagan, and his brother Little. While she enjoys her life, she yearns for a more serious relationship.

Mack hopes to find one in Nick, a sophisticated war correspondent who has just joined their newspaper. The two have sex, but she is disappointed to find that he only considers her a one-night stand, as they were intimate on their first night out. Mack convinces Adam to help her ensnare Nick. The foursome research Nick’s habits and preferences, eventually devising a plan called ‘The Flurry’.

The plan begins with Mack intentionally running into Nick, but ignoring him, attracting his attention. After finding out that he is going on a third date with another girl, the group - having also recruited the paper’s secretary Ashley - schemes to call his date away with an emergency, allowing Mack to take her place. The two start dating, while Adam begins seeing a new girl, Claire.

Nervous about the deal, Mack convinces Adam to run a play with her at brunch, who reluctantly agrees but cautions her to take the relationship more seriously. While at the meal, Mack and Adam demonstrate their natural chemistry and long history together, making Claire uncomfortable with their closeness.

Mack writes a feature about New Yorkers’ favorite sports memories, asking both Adam and Nick to read a draft. While Adam immediately reads and loves the piece, Nick is slow to get to it while working on his latest manuscript. At a gala event where Nick is receiving a humanitarian award from UNICEF, Mack reveals that Nick has rewritten her piece entirely rather than giving feedback.

Adam becomes upset at Nick’s treatment of her and storms off. Mack and Nick fight about the piece that night, where he reveals that her job could be in jeopardy in the next round of layoffs at the paper. They break up, and Mack submits her version of the story, which her editor loves, assigning her to work a Yankees game for the first time.

As the group - minus Adam - celebrates Mack’s success, they see Claire with another man. After confronting her, she reveals that she broke up with Adam after their brunch, unbeknownst to the group. She broke it off because Claire could tell that Adam was in love with Mack; Mack is initially resistant, but eventually admits that she has feelings for him too.

Adam avoids contact with Mack, but agrees to help Ashley surprise Little - who she has started dating - with tickets to the Yankees- Red Sox game that Mack is reporting on. To Adam’s surprise, he is actually the target of the play: letting Mack confess her love outside the stadium. They share a kiss before Mack runs off to work the game.

== Cast ==
- Gina Rodriguez as Mackenzie "Mack"
- Damon Wayans Jr. as Adam
- Tom Ellis as Nick Russell
- Augustus Prew as Brannagan
- Joel Courtney as Little
- Liza Koshy as Ashley
- Ego Nwodim as Claire
- Marin Hinkle as Karen Kirk
- Brock O'Hurn as Brady Stratton

== Production ==
It was reported in March 2021 that Gina Rodriguez, Damon Wayans Jr., and Tom Ellis would star in the film. Players was produced by Marc Platt Productions and Campfire Studios. Filming took place in New York City from July to September 2021.

== Release ==
The film was released by Netflix on February 14, 2024.

== Reception ==
On the review aggregator website Rotten Tomatoes, 53% of 30 critics' reviews are positive, with an average rating of 4.7/10. The website's consensus reads: "Players proves Gina Rodriguez remains a thoroughly charming lead, even if those charms aren't quite enough to compensate for a frustratingly predictable plot." Metacritic, which uses a weighted average, assigned the film a score of 52 out of 100, based on 10 critics, indicating "mixed or average" reviews.
