= Ambulance (2022 film) =

2022 film by Michael Bay

- Theatrical release poster
- Directed by: Michael Bay
- Screenplay by: Chris Fedak
- Based on: Ambulance by: Laurits Munch-Petersen; Lars Andreas Pedersen
- Produced by: Michael Bay; Bradley J. Fischer; Ian Bryce; William Sherak; James Vanderbilt
- Starring: Jake Gyllenhaal; Yahya Abdul-Mateen II; Eiza González
- Cinematography: Roberto De Angelis
- Edited by: Pietro Scalia; Doug Brandt; Calvin Wimmer
- Music by: Lorne Balfe
- Production companies: New Republic Pictures; Endeavor Content; Project X Entertainment; Bay Films
- Distributed by: Universal Pictures
- Release dates: March 16, 2022 (International); April 8, 2022 (United States)
- Running time: 136 minutes
- Country: United States
- Language: English
- Budget: $40 million
- Box office: $52.3 million

Ambulance is a 2022 American action thriller film directed by Michael Bay. It is a remake of the 2005 Danish film. It stars Jake Gyllenhaal and Yahya Abdul-Mateen II as adoptive brothers who hijack an ambulance after robbing a bank and take a paramedic (Eiza González) and an injured police officer (Jackson White) hostage.

The film was first announced in 2015 and went through several crew changes. In 2020, Bay came on board to direct after the COVID-19 pandemic disrupted his plans to shoot a different film. Filming took place in Los Angeles, in the midst of the pandemic, with cinematographer Roberto De Angelis. The score was composed by Lorne Balfe.

Ambulance was released in the United States on April 8, 2022, by Universal Pictures. The film underperformed at the box office, grossing $52 million on a budget of $40 million. It received mixed reviews from critics, with some praise for Gyllenhaal's performance and the action sequences.

== Plot ==
Afghanistan Marine veteran Will Sharp, desperately needing money for his wife Amy's surgery, reaches out to Danny, his adoptive brother and life-long criminal. He is talked into being the getaway driver for a $32 million bank heist. Though initially hesitant, Will agrees after Danny reaffirms that he is doing it for his wife, Amy.

The plan nearly succeeds until Officer Zach, who enters the bank to ask out a bank teller, discovers the situation and is held hostage. A shootout then occurs between one of the heist members and Zach's partner Officer Mark. The Special Investigation Section (SIS) of the LAPD arrives, killing or arresting most of the crew except for Will and Danny, who retreat toward the garage.

Zach attempts to escape, and during a scuffle is accidentally shot by Will. Leaving him behind, the brothers attempt to exit through the back of the building but find it surrounded by police. They then hijack an ambulance with EMT Cam Thompson, who is treating the injured Zach, on board. After a chase that leads them into an alleyway, Cam makes a desperate attempt to escape using a fire extinguisher but is quickly recaptured by Danny.

SIS Captain Monroe arrives on the scene and deploys helicopters to chase after the ambulance. Cam gets Danny to help her use a defibrillator and Will to transfer some of his blood to Zach, much to his confusion and frustration. Danny then calls Papi, one of his father's criminal friends, for help losing the police in exchange for $8 million.

When Cam stops Danny from shooting Mark, who has been chasing them, he threatens to throw her off the ambulance. The police are forced to retreat when it is discovered that Monroe's dog is inside Mark's police vehicle. FBI Agent Anson Clark, a former friend of Danny's, is put on the case. Zach begins to bleed out; Cam calls her surgeon ex-boyfriend, and with Will's assistance, begins to perform surgery on him.

Despite her inexperience and his spleen rupturing, Cam successfully performs the surgery. After, she tries to convince Will to stop Danny, to no avail. Monroe, unaware of the surgery's success, moves forward with the operation, preparing to snipe Will and Danny without negotiating for Cam's life. Clark calls Cam and tells her to get down.

Cam, not wanting them all to die, alerts Will and Danny about the snipers. Danny, fed up with her, decides to shoot her, but Will intervenes, causing the brothers to fight about their predicament. They later partially reconcile and listen to music together to ease the tension.

In the Los Angeles River, helicopters chase the ambulance as Danny shoots at them. Will and Danny then drive on the opposite lane of the interstate, creating multiple accidents. On Papi's orders, his son Roberto sends multiple ambulance decoys to distract the police and drives an ambulance towards a police roadblock after filling it with C-4 explosives. Papi deploys a minigun on a separate car to cause additional damage, wounding Monroe in the crossfire.

Mark chases down Roberto and fatally shoots him after a scuffle, leaving Papi angry and distraught. Will and Danny escape to Papi's hideout. He demands the brothers leave Zach and Cam with them to deal with; Will refuses to cooperate and teams up with Danny to kill Papi and his crew.

In the chaos, Cam accidentally shoots Will with Zach's gun. Danny takes the ambulance to a hospital and discovers the gun. He is enraged when Cam reveals that she was the one who shot Will. Danny vows to kill her along with himself on live television before confronting the police.

Left with no other choice, Will shoots Danny in the back, who apologizes to him before succumbing to his injuries. The police arrest a critically injured Will, taking him inside for surgery. Cam secretly gives some of the heist money to Amy for her surgery, and Zach, when questioned by the police about his injuries, tells them that Will saved his life.

== Cast ==
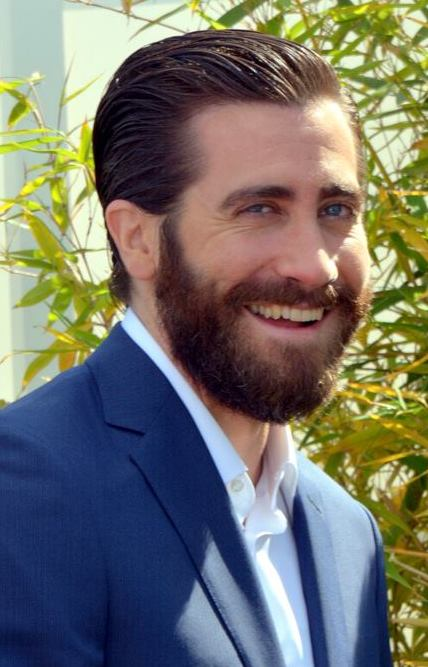
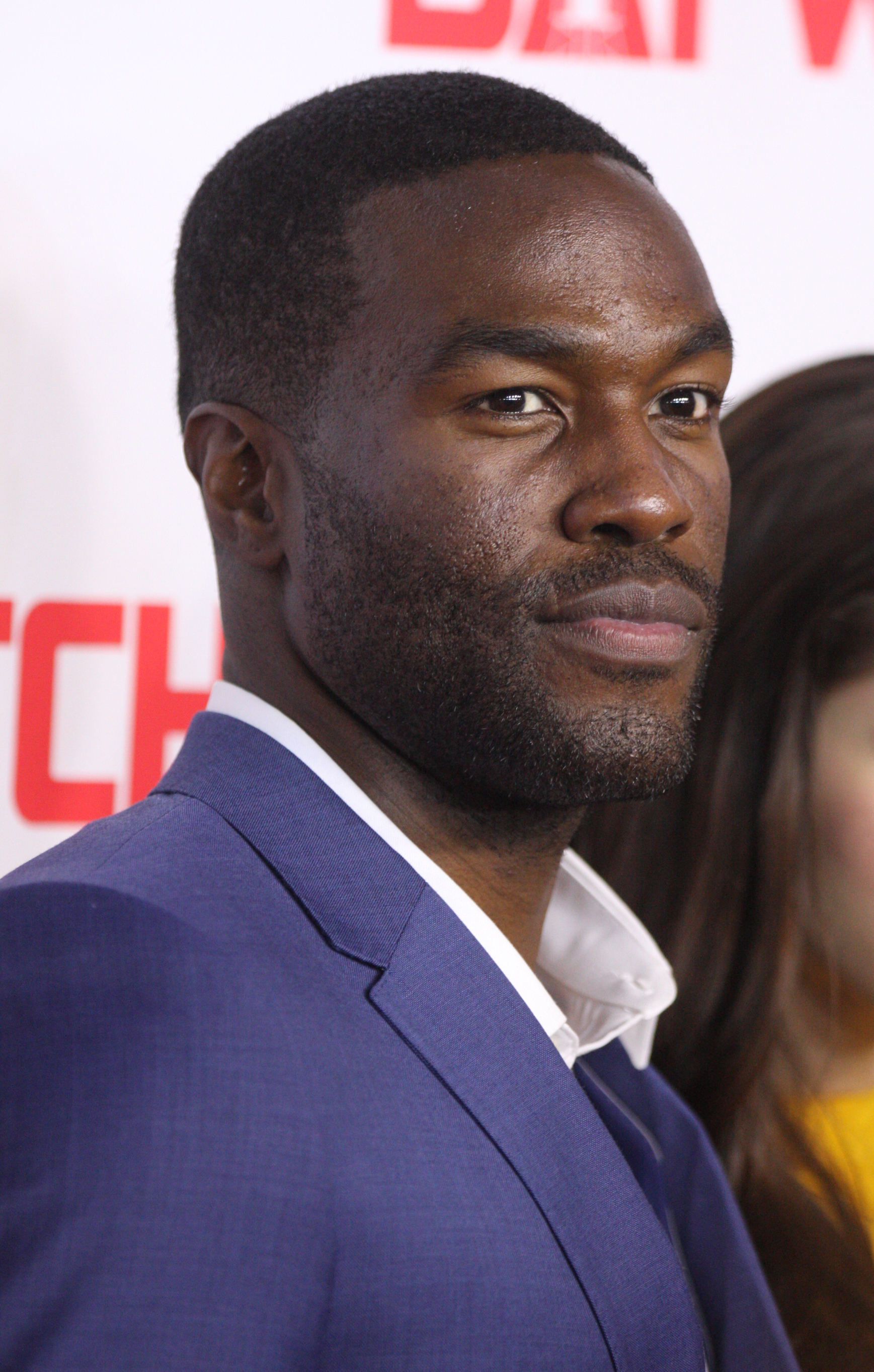
Jake Gyllenhaal and Yahya Abdul-Mateen II (both pictured in 2017) play the adoptive brothers turned bank robbers.
- Jake Gyllenhaal as Daniel "Danny" Sharp, a longtime criminal and Will's adoptive brother
- Yahya Abdul-Mateen II as William "Will" Sharp, a former U.S. Marine and Afghanistan veteran who joins his adoptive brother Danny for a heist so he can pay for his wife's surgery
- Eiza González as Paramedic Camille "Cam" Thompson, a young EMT Paramedic of LA Memorial Hospital who is unexpectedly taken hostage by the Sharp brothers
- Garret Dillahunt as LAPD Captain Monroe, field leader of the LAPD SIS unit in charge of hunting the Sharp brothers
- Keir O'Donnell as FBI Agent Anson Clark, leader of an FBI unit who is familiar with Danny Sharp due to their past friendship at college
- Jackson White as Officer Zach Parker, Mark's partner and a rookie officer who is taken hostage by the Sharp brothers
- Olivia Stambouliah as LAPD Lieutenant Dhazghig, a surveillance officer of the LAPD SIS unit
- Moses Ingram as Amy Sharp, Will Sharp's wife
- Colin Woodell as EMT Scott, Cam's partner
- Cedric Sanders as LAPD Officer Mark Ransaw, a young LAPD Field Training Officer (FTO) and Zach's partner
- A Martinez as Papi, a gang leader
- Jesse Garcia as Roberto, Papi's son
- Jose Pablo Cantillo as Jesus, a gang member and Papi's right handman
- Wale as Castro, a gang member and close friend of Danny
- Devan Chandler Long as 'Mel Gibson', a gang member of Danny who is referred by that name since he looks like the actor
- Randazzo Marc as Randazzo, one of Danny's gang member who serves as their getaway escort driver
- Victor Gojcaj as Victor
- Brendan Miller as Trent
- Briella Guiza as Lindsey, a little girl who is helped out by Cam
- Jenn Proske as Lindsey's mom
- Remi Adeleke as SIS Detective Wade
- Jamie McBride as SIS Detective Jay
- Chelsea Harris as bicycle cop

== Production ==
=== Development ===
Ambulance is an American remake of the 2005 Danish film of the same name. Producer Bradley J. Fischer said Michael Bay was his first choice to direct but he originally passed on the project. The film was announced on August 28, 2015, with Phillip Noyce attached to direct from a script by Chris Fedak. Two years later, the directing duo Navot Papushado and Aharon Keshales replaced Noyce, but this version of the film never entered production.

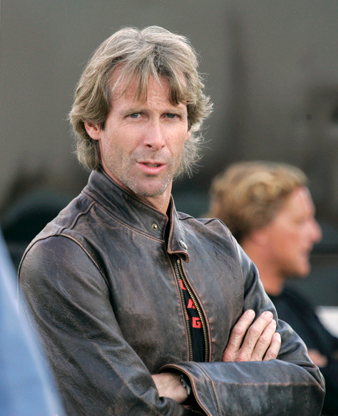
Michael Bay saw the film's script as an opportunity to direct a "small movie" during the COVID pandemic.

In 2020, the COVID-19 pandemic in Los Angeles preempted Bay's plans to shoot his next film, Black Five. He recalled telling his agent "Goddamnit, I just want to get out and shoot something fast. I'm tired of being locked up at home." He pitched an idea to Donna Langley, the Chairwoman of Universal Pictures, saying he wanted to direct a "small" film focusing on the tension between characters trapped in a claustrophobic setting. Bay was reminded of Ambulance and told it could be shot on a relatively low-budget in a short period. "It kind of suited my needs," he said. On November 11, 2020, Bay was announced as the new director, and the film was referred to as a "character-driven project" that would move away from Bay's normality of "standard explosion-heavy fare" while deriving elements from Speed (1994) and Bad Boys (1995). Bay did not watch or read the screenplay of the original Danish film because he wanted to make the film his own.

The film was financed by Endeavor Content and produced by New Republic Pictures and Project X. Jake Gyllenhaal received the screenplay while shooting The Guilty in November 2020. The following month, the film was announced with Gyllenhaal and Dylan O'Brien in talks to star as the two adoptive brothers who hijack the ambulance and Eiza González in negotiations to play the paramedic. Gyllenhaal's casting was a contributing factor in Bay's decision to shoot the film. To prepare for the role, González spent three months "working intimately with firefighters, EMTs, surgeons, [and] everyone around the medical care system." She also rented an ambulance and had a friend drive her around to improve her balance. On December 11, 2020, Universal Pictures confirmed they would distribute the film and announced O'Brien had dropped out of the project due to scheduling conflicts; Yahya Abdul-Mateen II was cast as his replacement when he was able to fit the film into his schedule, following a production delay on Aquaman and the Lost Kingdom (2023). González was confirmed to star three days later. The rest of the cast was announced between January and May 2021. On joining the cast, A Martinez said he submitted a self-made audition video from Auckland, New Zealand.

=== Filming ===
Filming began on January 11, 2021, in downtown Los Angeles, with a $40 million budget. Filming wrapped on March 18, 2021, after thirty-eight days.

During pre-production, stunt coordinator Mike Gunther put the three lead actors through stunt driving courses to test their driving abilities. Supervising location manager Rob Gibson obtained driving permits for numerous streets and freeway corridors in the city using his close relationship with FilmLA. Due to the COVID-19 pandemic, the crew had to follow safety protocols such as wearing masks on set. The production borrowed six ambulances from Falck. The scenes inside of the ambulance were captured using three ambulances: one was driven with the crew on board; a second could be dismantled; and a third was rocked on a stage. The limited space inside of the ambulance required Gyllenhaal to hold the camera for some takes.

Several Komodo digital cameras by Red were used. A considerable amount of the film was shot using first-person view drones by LightCraft, a company discovered by executive producer Michael Kase after seeing their footage of the top of the Wilshire Grand Center. Bay said this way of filming was implemented because he was inspired by Steven Spielberg's direction on War of the Worlds (2005) to come up with new ways to put his stories on screen while simultaneously limiting himself as a director. The drones in the film were flown by Drone Racing League pilots Jordan Temkin and Alex Vanover using head-mounted displays. Footage captured by the drones included scenes in the Los Angeles Convention Center and the city's Fashion District. To increase the story's authenticity, the cast improvised some of their lines. The production also hired real trauma surgeons, firefighters, SWAT teams, snipers, undercover SIS members, and 52 LAPD officers for the shoot.

On the first day of filming, while shooting footage of the ambulance driving on a freeway, Bay noticed several patrol officers and three motorcycle cops. He asked them if they wanted to star in the film, to which they agreed, and used the opportunity to sweet talk the officers into creating a rolling roadblock, allowing them to close the freeway for free instead of paying the average $350–400 thousand cost. On Garret Dillahunt's first day on set, the crew was able to secure access to an area featuring the Los Angeles City Hall, the Times Mirror Square building, and the LAPD headquarters for a mere 19 minutes worth of natural light to film. To describe the gravity of the situation, Bay was told that would be "the only time [and] the last time you are ever going to get this corner, this area." As the time started, Bay realized he had to spend some time fitting the English Mastiff in the film, his own dog, into a small vehicle. He called it the most difficult day on set.

The helicopter chase sequence in the Los Angeles River was not in the script; Bay came up with the idea over a weekend after two helicopters became available for use. The scene was shot in two and a half hours with the help of helicopter pilot Fred North. Instead of hiring stuntmen for the sequence, Gyllenhaal was actually hanging off the side of the ambulance's door and shooting at the helicopters himself while an excited Abdul-Mateen live-streamed the event to his friend as he was driving. Bay took responsibility for a video shared on his Instagram of a stunt involving the ambulance crashing into several vehicles. The clip was criticized by the mayor and the governor of Los Angeles for endangering the crew and censored on Instagram. He explained the logistics behind the stunt and how it was filmed in an hour-long interview with Collider, claiming it was "perfectly planned". Furthermore, Bay said they shot "90 shots to 120 shots a day. That's a lot of shots. Most movies are 20 to 30 shots a day. But you know I was there with the camera. I'm a director who doesn't have a video village, I don't have a director's chair, I don't have a trailer. I'm right there with the actors and we work fast".

=== Post-production ===
The musical score was composed by Lorne Balfe, who previously collaborated with Bay on 13 Hours: The Secret Soldiers of Benghazi (2016) and 6 Underground (2019), recorded in London's Abbey Road Studios, and released on April 8, 2022, by Back Lot Music. Editing was completed by Pietro Scalia. Due to the film's budget, Bay said he was not happy with some of the visual effects in the film: "There's not a lot of CGI. And you know, some of the CGI is shit in this movie." In a separate interview, he added, "I don't use CGI much. On Ambulance there's very little CGI on it. It's all real crashes ... If you're using CGI, it needs to be realistic."

== Release ==
The film was released internationally on March 15, 2022, and in the United States by Universal Pictures on April 8, 2022. It was originally set to be released on February 18, 2022, coinciding with the release of Uncharted, but was pushed back after Sony postponed Bullet Train from April 8 to July 15, leaving the time slot open for another film. As a result of the Russian invasion of Ukraine, Universal "paused" the theatrical release of the film in Russia.

The film had screening events at the UGC Normandie in Paris, France, on March 20, 2022, in Berlin on March 22, in London on March 23, in Spain on March 24, in Los Angeles at the Academy Museum of Motion Pictures on April 4, and in Miami on April 5. The Los Angeles event was attended by Jason Momoa, Abdul-Mateen's Aquaman co-star.

=== Home media ===
The film was released digitally and on video-on-demand on May 23, 2022, with the 4K UHD, Blu-Ray, and DVD being released on June 14, 2022.

== Marketing ==
The first trailer was shown at CinemaCon on August 25, 2021, and released online on October 21, 2021. It featured a cover of the song "California Dreamin'" sung by Bobby Womack. The Hollywood Reporter compared the footage to Heat (1995) and Training Day (2001), and Deadline Hollywood noted "the rapid rhythm that Bay does best." Entertainment Weekly said the film looked like "pure chaos, thanks to a lot of quick camera cuts, loads of gunfire, a high-speed ambulance chase, and Jake Gyllenhaal doing the absolute most with his bank robber character." A second trailer was released on March 24, 2022. It featured the song "Sailing" by Christopher Cross. Entertainment Weekly wrote, "The latest trailer for the chaotic heist-gone-wrong film is peak Michael Bay, with everything you could possibly want from an action flick".

The film was marketed as a counterprogramming option for older male moviegoers. Pre-sales for the film trended ahead of Lionsgate's Moonfall (2022), which had a larger budget. Shawn Robbins from Boxoffice Pro said Universal had "done a fine job reaching its target male audience with significant promotion during major sporting events over the past few months." According to iSpot, Universal spent $33 million on television spots promoting the film, which generated 819 million impressions across the United States. Commercials were generally aired during sporting events such as NFL and NBA games, men's college basketball, Super Bowl LVI, and the Winter Olympics, as well as re-runs of The Big Bang Theory.

== Reception ==
=== Box office ===
Ambulance grossed $22.8 million in the United States and Canada, and $29.5 million in other territories, for a worldwide total of $52.3 million.

In the US and Canada, Ambulance was released alongside Sonic the Hedgehog 2 and the wide expansion of Everything Everywhere All at Once. It was projected to gross $8–14 million from 3,412 theaters in its opening weekend. Variety's Rebecca Rubin believed the "comparatively lean production budget ... could soften the blow in the event the film doesn't connect with audiences." The film made $3.2 million on its first day, including $700,000 from Thursday night previews. It went on to gross $8.7 million in its opening weekend, finishing fourth at the box office. Men made up 62% of the audience during its opening, with those above the age of 25 comprising 77% of ticket sales and those above 35 comprising 49%. The ethnic breakdown of the audience showed that 38% were Caucasian, 29% Hispanic and Latino Americans, 22% African American, and 11% Asian or other. Deadline Hollywood's Anthony D'Alessandro noted the reluctance of older male audiences to return to theaters and said, "when it comes to action films in today's cinemas, it's the superhero films that have it all, everything else is B-rated. They've stolen the air away from something as standard as Ambulance." The film made $4.1 million in its second weekend, and $1.8 million in its third, before dropping out of the box office top ten with $1.2 million in its fourth. Rubin deemed the film a box-office bomb, citing its release in a crowded marketplace, lukewarm reviews, the effects of the COVID-19 pandemic on moviegoing habits, and the action genre's steady decline in popularity. The film managed to regain success on streaming platforms, outgrowing its box office and gaining more audiences.

Outside the US and Canada, the film earned $4.4 million from 35 international markets in its opening weekend. It made $6.6 million in its second weekend, $2.8 million in its fourth, $1.4 million in its fifth, $1.8 million in its sixth, and $572,000 in its seventh.

=== Critical response ===
On the review aggregator website Rotten Tomatoes, 68% of 256 critics gave the film a positive review, with an average rating of 5.8/10. The website's critical consensus reads, "At top speed and with sirens wailing, Ambulance comes riding to the rescue for audiences facing an emergency shortage of Michael Bay action thrills." It is the second highest-rated film directed by Bay on the site, as well as the second to hold a "fresh" rating, alongside The Rock (1996). Metacritic, which uses a weighted average, assigned the film a score of 55 out of 100 based on 55 critics, indicating "mixed or average" reviews. Audiences polled by CinemaScore gave the film an average grade of "A−" on an A+ to F scale, while those at PostTrak gave it a 77% positive score, with 61% saying they would definitely recommend it.

Bay's direction was well received by critics. John Nugent of Empire said the filmmaker's "tribute to the emergency services (which involves blowing several of them up) is noisy, messy and frequently absurd — yet still somehow his most gleefully entertaining effort in at least a decade." The Independent's Clarisse Loughrey said it was "as exhausting as it is exhilarating, in the way you both expect and desire from a Bay film." Frank Scheck from The Hollywood Reporter and Danny Leigh from Financial Times also described it as "exhausting". While Scheck called it a "decently premised B-movie stretched out to an interminable 136 minutes", Leigh said it was "hard to resist" and that audiences "would miss Bay if he vanished from the Hollywood menagerie." Kevin Maher of The Times wrote, "Everything here is Bay squared. It's a film that simply does not stop."

The story and performances received some criticism. TheWrap's Robert Abele found Gyllenhaal's acting unconvincing and "over-the-top" and Abdul-Mateen's character a "poorly conceived good guy in over his head." He also said "Bay's addiction to confusion and pointlessness as operating visual narrative principles keeps this from being in any way pleasurable." A. O. Scott of The New York Times was positive about the performances but found the story predictable: "It all ends up pretty much where you expect it will, but the actors do a good job of seething and emoting under pressure, and Gyllenhaal does a volatile, charming sociopath thing that isn't as annoying as it might be." Tim Grierson, for Screen Daily, said the film "spotlights [Bay]'s visual panache alongside his considerable storytelling weaknesses." The Guardian's Peter Bradshaw said "Ambulance has everything ... except actors giving a decent performance as believable characters in a workable script." The Evening Standard's Charlotte O'Sullivan noted that the film picks up once the characters enter the ambulance, adding that "the B-movie [Gyllenhaal] and Bay have cobbled together is genuinely diverting." Meanwhile, Collider praised Ambulance as Bay's best film since The Rock and Bad Boys II as well as his "most human film to date", citing its emphasis on character development and emotional depth beyond his signature explosive action set-pieces.
