= The Space Between (2021 film) =

2021 American film by Rachel Winter

- Theatrical release poster
- Directed by: Rachel Winter
- Written by: Will Aldis
- Produced by: Steven Samuels; Milan Popelka; Rachel Winter; Michael Roiff
- Starring: Kelsey Grammer; Jackson White; Julia Goldani Telles; Paris Jackson; Andy Daly; William Fichtner
- Cinematography: Matthew Irving
- Edited by: Adam Zuckerman
- Music by: Rivers Cuomo
- Production companies: Night & Day Pictures; Samuels Media Capital; Tangerine Pictures
- Distributed by: Paramount Pictures
- Release dates: April 23, 2021 (United States); June 15, 2021 (VOD)
- Running time: 95 minutes
- Country: United States
- Language: English

The Space Between is a 2021 American coming-of-age comedy film from Rachel Winter in her directorial debut. The film stars Kelsey Grammer, Jackson White, and Paris Jackson, and follows a musician named Micky Adams (Grammer) who becomes friends with Charlie Porter (White), a man sent to remove Adams from a record label contract in Los Angeles. Paramount Pictures theatrically released the film in the United States on April 23, 2021, and digitally released it on June 15.

== Plot ==
In 1996 Los Angeles, Micky Adams is an eccentric, singer-songwriter, burnout 70s rock musician. He has lost his grip on reality and his record label is looking to drop him and his newly created "unique" albums.

Hoping to be promoted out of the record-label mailroom, young Charlie Porter volunteers to seek the musician out in Montecito, his bizarre home 'Xanadont', to convince Micky to sign out of his contract.

Things do not go as Charlie planned. Micky invites him in, with attitude, overgrown hair and beard, soon dosing him with psychedelics. Before Charlie knows what is happening, he finds himself uninhibited, wandering alongside the free-thinking hippie through trees with a llama to the beach. He wakes up face down in the sand, buck naked. He finds his way back on foot, finally meeting Mickey's daughter Julia. She says he is not crazy, but hiding.

Charlie tells the company head, Donny, that he got the contract signed, then hooks up with Cory, the singer he hopes to sign to the label. He heads back to Micky's and instead of getting the signature, helps Julia deal with his meltdown over paparazzi photos. Afterward, she tells him about her mom's passing, and goes out. Wandering around the house and grounds, Charlie puts on one of Micky's many LPs, then finds an upright randomly on the back lawn. He starts playing, which draws Micky out of the house. He sits by him, accompanying him, inspired. Taking over the keyboard, he has a flashback of his wife and daughter dancing.

Micky feels Charlie is his muse. Talking in the car, Charlie opens up about his dysfunctional relationship with his alcoholic father. They are heading to Micky's childhood home. Finding it a shambles, he loudly tries to break in, and they get thrown into jail. There, he calls Charlie his best friend, and Julia picks them up. On the ride back, she and Charlie share secrets.

Cory is waiting for Charlie when he arrives home. The next day, he introduces her at Donny's label party, and is sent away by him back to get the signature. Again, he gets sucked in as Charlie has an odd but powerful bond with Micky/Julia. He tags along as the newly inspired Micky dresses to perform in a small bar. When he chokes, he quietly asks for a pen, and signs the contract, dejected.

Talking to Charlie later, believing he will not see him again, Micky refers to the painting on the Sistine Chapel The Creation of Adam: music is the space between the two outstretched fingers, love and hate, man and woman, life and death, heaven and hell. Shortly after Cameroon, the paparazzi resurfaces, reiterating that Charlie has lit a spark in Micky, something he has been waiting for with bated breath. Sure enough, Donny waves away the contract Charlie has finally gotten signed. The naked photos of their first meeting were printed on the front page of National Enquirer making Micky a hot commodity, and he gives him two weeks to prepare for the Grammys.

When Charlie goes to tell Micky, Julia is upset because he has gone missing. As they head out to look for him, Cameroon arrives. At first, they do not know where to look, until Charlie realizes he is gone to surf. For the third time, he jumps in to pull out Micky. That evening, all three go to the same bar. This time, not only is he able to perform, but he dedicates a song to his ever-loyal Julia.

As they are leaving, Donny approaches them. Charlie again happily hands him the contract, declaring they are set up with a recording contract elsewhere. The film closes on a close-up photo of Charlie and Julia facing one other, barely touching, on the cover of a new CD entitled, 'The Space Between'.

== Cast ==
- Kelsey Grammer as Micky Adams
- Jackson White as Charlie Porter
- Julia Goldani Telles as Julia Adams
- Paris Jackson as Cory
- Andy Daly as Cameroon Robbins
- William Fichtner as Donny Rumson

== Production ==
The independent film The Space Between was announced on July 17, 2018, when Kelsey Grammer was cast in the project from director Rachel Winter and spec script writer Will Aldis. Filming began in Los Angeles, California that same week, with Jackson White and Paris Jackson joining the cast. On April 13, 2021, Paramount Pictures acquired the rights to the film and announced it would theatrically release it in the United States on April 23, 2021, with a digital release on June 15.

== Reception ==
In a negative review, Glenn Kenny from The New York Times wrote that "This is one of those movies that never quite sinks to the risible depths you kind of wish it would."
