= Tyne Rafaeli =

Theater and television director

Tyne Rafaeli is a British-American director based in New York.

She was nominated for the Drama League and Drama Desk awards. Her credits include Becoming Eve, Usual Girls, I Was Most Alive With You, In a Word, and the Pulitzer Prize Finalist, Selling Kabul. She spent much of her early career working with Bartlett Sher including working on The Bridges of Madison County and Fiddler on the Roof.

Rafaeli grew up in London and went to graduate school at Columbia University. Her father grew up in Tel Aviv and her mother in New York.

== Filmography ==
=== Film and TV directing ===
Year	Title	Note(s)
2020	Forever Alone	6 episodes
2021–2022	The Good Fight	2 episodes
2022	Keep This Far Apart	Winner of Best TV Series/Pilot/Web at the London New Wave Film Festival
2023	Single Drunk Female	Episode: "Darby"
2024	Elsbeth	Episode: "Artificial Genius"
2024	Evil	Episode: "How to Save a Life"
2024–2026	Tell Me Lies	6 episodes
2025	Tracker	Episode: "Monster"
2025	The Beast in Me	2 episodes
2026	Cupertino	Episode: "Judith & Michael"

=== Podcast directing ===
Year	Title	Note(s)
2022	Self Center	Audible Original
2022	The Miranda Obsession	Audible Original
2025	Madam Ram	Lucky Chap & QCode Media
2025	Summer Breeze	Audible Original

=== Acting ===
Year	Title	Role	Note(s)
1998	Casualty	Sally Lennox	Episode: "Public Service"
2009	Holy Water	Emily Murray	
2009	The Fourth Kind	Sarah Fisher	
