= Julia Goldani Telles =

American actress and ballet dancer

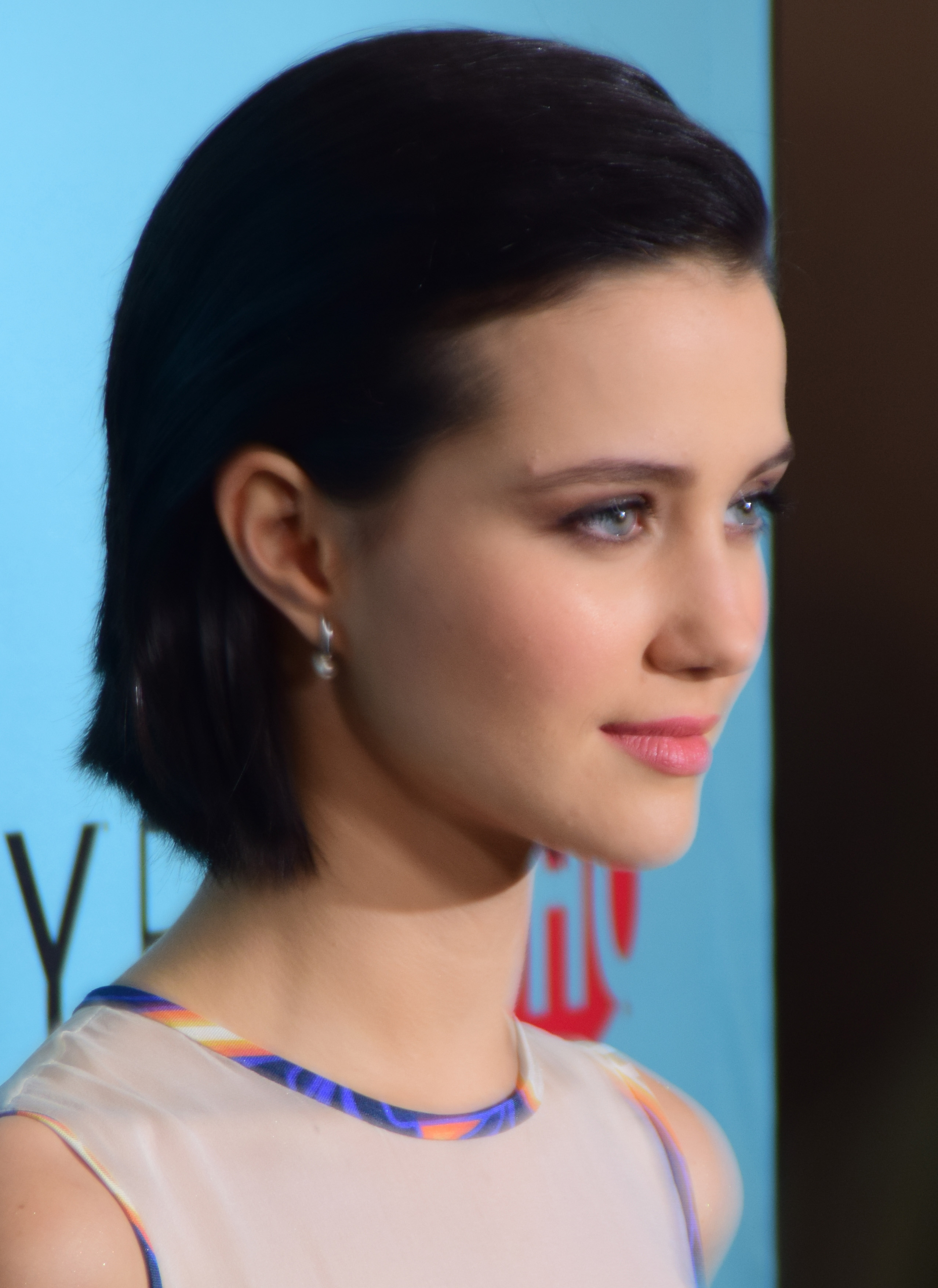
- Goldani Telles at Showtime's The Affair FYC Screening and Panel, May 6, 2015
- Born: Los Angeles, California, U.S.
- Education: University of Southern California
- Occupations: Actress; ballet dancer
- Years active: 2011–present

Julia Goldani Telles is a Brazilian-American actress and ballet dancer. She is known for playing Sasha Torres on the short-lived ABC Family series Bunheads (2012–2013), Whitney Solloway on the Showtime original series The Affair (2014–2019), and Iris in the third season of The Girlfriend Experience (2021).

== Early life ==
Goldani Telles was born in Los Angeles, California, to a Brazilian mother and Mexican father. She moved with her parents to Rio de Janeiro when she was almost two years old. It was there that she was introduced to the world of ballet at the age of five. When the family relocated back to Los Angeles that year, Goldani Telles could speak only Portuguese and learned English after the family's move. Goldani Telles moved to New York City when she was 13.

Goldani Telles trained at the School of American Ballet and Ballet Academy East, and appeared in numerous ballet performances including Sleeping Beauty, Nutcracker, Don Quixote, and Swan Lake. A case of tendonitis and labral tears in her hips at the age of 15 forced Goldani Telles to stop practicing ballet for a year; to avoid depression, she decided to take a drama course.

== Career ==
Goldani Telles studied at Columbia University, but graduated from the University of Southern California with a degree in English in 2026. Her first television role came in 2011 when she successfully auditioned for the part of Sasha Torres in ABC Family's Bunheads. She did so, having never had an acting job before and without head-shots or a résumé. Her agent felt Bunheads should have been one of her first auditions as he felt she would be comfortable with the dancing aspect of the show. The pilot episode was filmed in November 2011. Bunheads was picked up to series and ran for eighteen episodes from June 11, 2012, to February 25, 2013.

As well as Bunheads, Goldani Telles also appeared in the Nat & Alex Wolff music video for the song "Greatest Prize" in early 2012.

She also guest starred on the Blue Bloods episode "The Bogeyman" which aired January 10, 2014.

Goldani Telles played the role of oldest daughter Whitney on the Showtime drama series The Affair.

In May, 2021, Goldani Telles starred as Iris in the third season of the Starz series The Girlfriend Experience.

== Filmography ==
Television and film roles
Year	Title	Role	Notes
2012–2013	Bunheads	Sasha Torres	Main role
2014	Blue Bloods	Morgan	Episode: "The Bogeyman"
2014	The Carrie Diaries	Amelia Strong	Episode: "Hungry Like the Wolf"
2014	Nurse Jackie	Mandy	3 episodes
2014–2019	The Affair	Whitney Solloway	Main role
2016	Gilmore Girls: A Year in the Life	Sandee Martin	Episode: "Spring"
2018	Most Likely to Murder	Tami Douscher	Film
2018	Slender Man	Hallie Knudsen	Film
2018	The Wind	Emma Harper	Film
2020	Looks That Kill	Alex	Film
2020	Helpsters	Ballerina Betsy	Episode: "Ballerina Betsy/Pizza Pasquale"
2021	The Space Between	Julia Adams	Film
2021	The Girlfriend Experience	Iris Stanton	Main role (season 3)
2022	Law & Order: Special Victims Unit	Kelsey Jones	Episode: Mirror Effect
2023	Accused	Alice Baylor	Episode: "Samir's Story"
