= Laurits Munch-Petersen =

Danish film director (born 1973)

Laurits Munch-Petersen (born on July 19, 1973; in Copenhagen) is a Danish film director who graduated from the National Film School of Denmark with his Student Academy Award-winning diploma film "Between Us" (Mellem Os) in 2004. This film won 13 international film awards and became the most award-winning film in the history of The National Film School of Denmark.

Laurits directed several films and series including the feature film Ambulance (2005), Seducer's Fall (2007), Over the Edge (2012), Shadow of a Hero (2015), Dolphin (2017), On the Road with Dad (2018), etc.

In 2021 Laurits' feature film "Ambulance" was remade as Ambulance by Hollywood director Michael Bay and starring Jake Gyllenhaal.

Laurits is the son of the internationally acclaimed Danish designer Ursula Munch-Petersen and Danish painter Erik Hagens, and grandson of legendary Danish painter and poet Gustaf Munch-Petersen who was shot at the age of 26 during the Spanish Civil War in 1938.

Laurits has three daughters: Iris Munch-Petersen (born 2009) Lucia Munch-Petersen (born 2013) and Mila Munch-Petersen (born 2018). Iris and Lucia appear in his film "Shadow of a Hero" (2015) and his children's TV series "On the Road with Dad" (2018), which became the most viewed TV series on DR Ramasjang in 2018.

Laurits is also a writer and director for the new Danish TV series "Crasher", based on Søren Kierkegaard "Diary of a Seducer", which premiered on December 1, 2023.

== Filmography ==
- Crasher (2023) – TV series, Director and Writer
- On the Road with Dad (2019) – TV series
- Dolphin (2017) – Short film
- Shadow of a Hero (2015) – Feature film
- Over the Edge (2012) – Feature film
- The 7 Killings (2010) – TV series
- Hurry Home (2009) – Documentary feature film
- Seducer's Fall (2008) – Documentary feature film
- Ambulance (2005) Feature film
- Between Us (2003) – Short film – Oscar-winner
- Livshunger (2002) – TV series, Actor
- The Good Son (2001) – Short film
- Three on a Bike (2001) – Short film
- Tempo (1998) – Short film
- It's a Game (1998) – Short film
- The Circle (1996) – Feature film shot in Mexico
- Lisa's Day (1994) – Short film
- A Woman in Every Town (1993) – Short film
