= Ambulance (2005 film) =

- Poster
- Danish: Ambulancen
- Directed by: Laurits Munch-Petersen
- Written by: Laurits Munch-Petersen; Lars Andreas Pedersen
- Produced by: Tomas Radoor
- Starring: Paw Henriksen; Thomas Bo Larsen; Helle Fagralid
- Cinematography: Jan Pallesen
- Edited by: Cathrine Ambus
- Music by: Peter Peter; Peter Kyed
- Production company: Nordisk Film
- Release date: 15 July 2005
- Running time: 76 minutes
- Country: Denmark
- Language: Danish

Ambulance (Danish: Ambulancen) is a 2005 Danish action thriller film directed by Laurits Munch-Petersen, who co-wrote the film along with Lars Andreas Pedersen. It stars Paw Henriksen, Thomas Bo Larsen and Helle Fagralid. The film follows two brothers who commit a bank robbery and steal an ambulance as their getaway vehicle to escape cops chasing after them, only to discover a nurse and a patient in it. The film was released on 15 July 2005. In 2022, an American remake with the same name directed by Michael Bay was released.

== Plot ==
Brothers Tim and Frank decide to rob a bank in order to steal money for their mother's treatment. They enter the bank and obtain the money, but Tim ends up firing a shot, leading to chaos. In an attempt to escape the police, the brothers steal an ambulance. During the pursuit, they throw away the GPS and later find out there is a nurse and a heart patient in the back of the ambulance. Tim and Frank enter a junkyard, where they find the getaway car Tim arranged for is missing. They attempt to steal a car, but a phone call from their mother as well as cops closing in on them prompts them to continue using the ambulance. The nurse Julie frequently requests that the brothers help her and take the patient to the hospital; Tim shows sympathy and shares their situation with her, while Frank remains focused on fleeing the cops.

Learning that a helicopter is chasing after them, they enter a forest and park the ambulance inside a barn. When the patient's pulse drops to zero, Tim and Julie begin operating with the help of experts over a phone, while Frank paints the ambulance black to avoid being noticed. Tim and Julie manage to save the patient, but Frank decides to leave them behind while he and Tim escape in the ambulance. Tim is against it, but is forced to go along. Leaving Julie and the patient with limited oxygen, Tim and Frank drive away from the forest. Tim tries to call an ambulance for Julie but is unable provide her location. He begins to resist and attempts to grab Frank's gun, crashing the ambulance into a tree and injuring them both. Tim gets the gun and forces Frank to drive the ambulance back into the woods in order to save the patient and take him to a hospital. After refueling the ambulance, they manage to arrive in the nick of time to prevent the patient's death.

Now on the road, Tim communicates with the police and tricks them into believing they will be dropping the patient and Julie at a hospital, while actually driving to a different hospital in Fakse, planning to drop the hostages there while the cops surround the other hospital. The ambulance accidentally hits a police vehicle on arrival, and Frank tries to escape in the ambulance again, but with its backdoors open and the patient hanging out of it, all the stolen money begins to fly out of the vehicle, so he stops. Frank holds Julie at gunpoint while the cops aim at him. However, he points the gun at Tim, blaming him for everything that went wrong in his life. He is about to shoot him, before a female cop guns down Frank, who collapses in Tim's arms. The police cuff Tim to the stretcher. The patient and Julie are finally saved, and as Tim is being taken to the hospital, Julie tells him she will try to help his mother.

== Cast ==
- Paw Henriksen as Tim
- Thomas Bo Larsen as Frank
- Helle Fagralid as Julie
