= Enoch Arden (disambiguation) =

"Enoch Arden" is a narrative poem published in 1864 by Alfred, Lord Tennyson.

Enoch Arden may also refer to:

- Enoch Arden (1911 film), an American, two-part short silent drama directed by D. W. Griffith and starring Wilfred Lucas
- Enoch Arden (1914 film), a British silent drama directed by Percy Nash and starring Gerald Lawrence
- Enoch Arden (1915 film), an American short drama directed by Christy Cabanne and starring Alfred Paget
- Enoch Arden (Strauss), Op. 38, TrV. 181, a melodrama for narrator and piano, written in 1897 by Richard Strauss
- Enoch Arden law, a legal precedent in the United States that grants a divorce or a legal exemption so that a person can remarry in the event of a spouse's absence
