= Sagal twins =

The Sagal twins are the American actresses:

- Jean Sagal
- Liz Sagal
