= My Favorite Wife =

1940 film by Garson Kanin

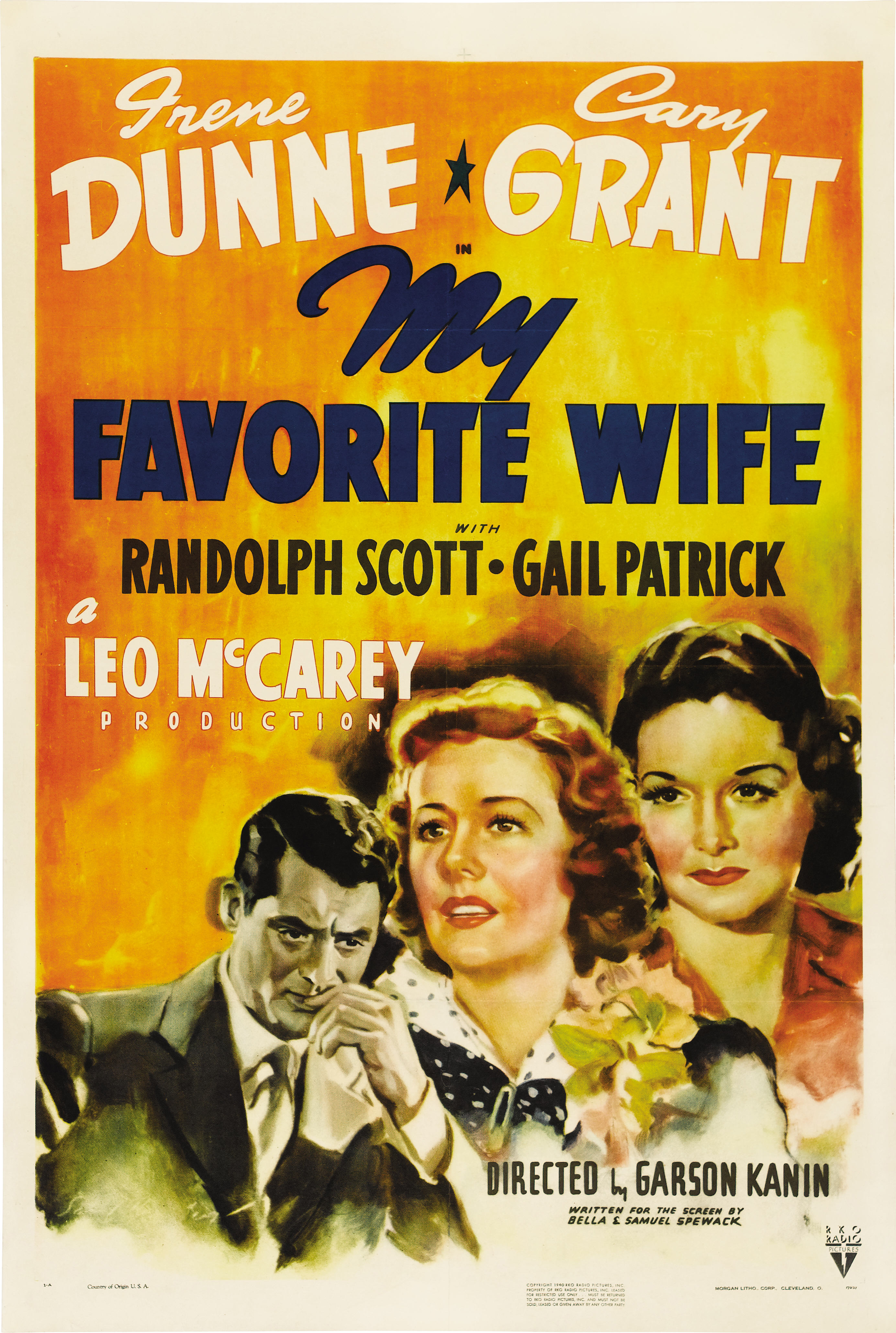
- Theatrical release poster
- Directed by: Garson Kanin
- Screenplay by: Bella Spewack; Samuel Spewack
- Story by: Leo McCarey; Bella Spewack; Samuel Spewack
- Produced by: Leo McCarey
- Starring: Irene Dunne; Cary Grant; Randolph Scott; Gail Patrick
- Cinematography: Rudolph Maté
- Edited by: Robert Wise
- Music by: Roy Webb
- Production company: RKO Radio Pictures
- Distributed by: RKO Radio Pictures
- Release date: May 17, 1940
- Running time: 88 minutes
- Country: United States
- Language: English
- Budget: $921,000
- Box office: $2,057,000

My Favorite Wife is a 1940 American screwball comedy film produced by Leo McCarey and directed by Garson Kanin. It stars Irene Dunne as a woman who, after being shipwrecked on a tropical island for several years and declared legally dead, returns to her former husband (Cary Grant) and children.

The story is an adaptation of Alfred, Lord Tennyson's 1864 poem "Enoch Arden". In tribute, the main characters' last name is Arden.

The supporting cast features Gail Patrick as the woman Arden has just married when his first wife returns, and Randolph Scott as the man with whom his wife was marooned. My Favorite Wife was RKO's second most successful film of 1940.

== Plot ==
After seven years, lawyer Nick Arden has his wife Ellen, missing since her ship was lost, declared legally dead so he can marry Bianca. He has the same judge first make the declaration then perform the marriage ceremony.

However, Ellen was actually shipwrecked on a deserted island and has just been rescued. When she returns home, she sees her son and daughter for the first time since they were very small. The boy speaks very matter-of-factly about their mother dying at sea. The children do not recognize her, but their dog does. Going inside, Ellen learns from her mother-in-law that Nick has just left on his honeymoon with his second wife, whom he'd met when he was on a journey in search of her.

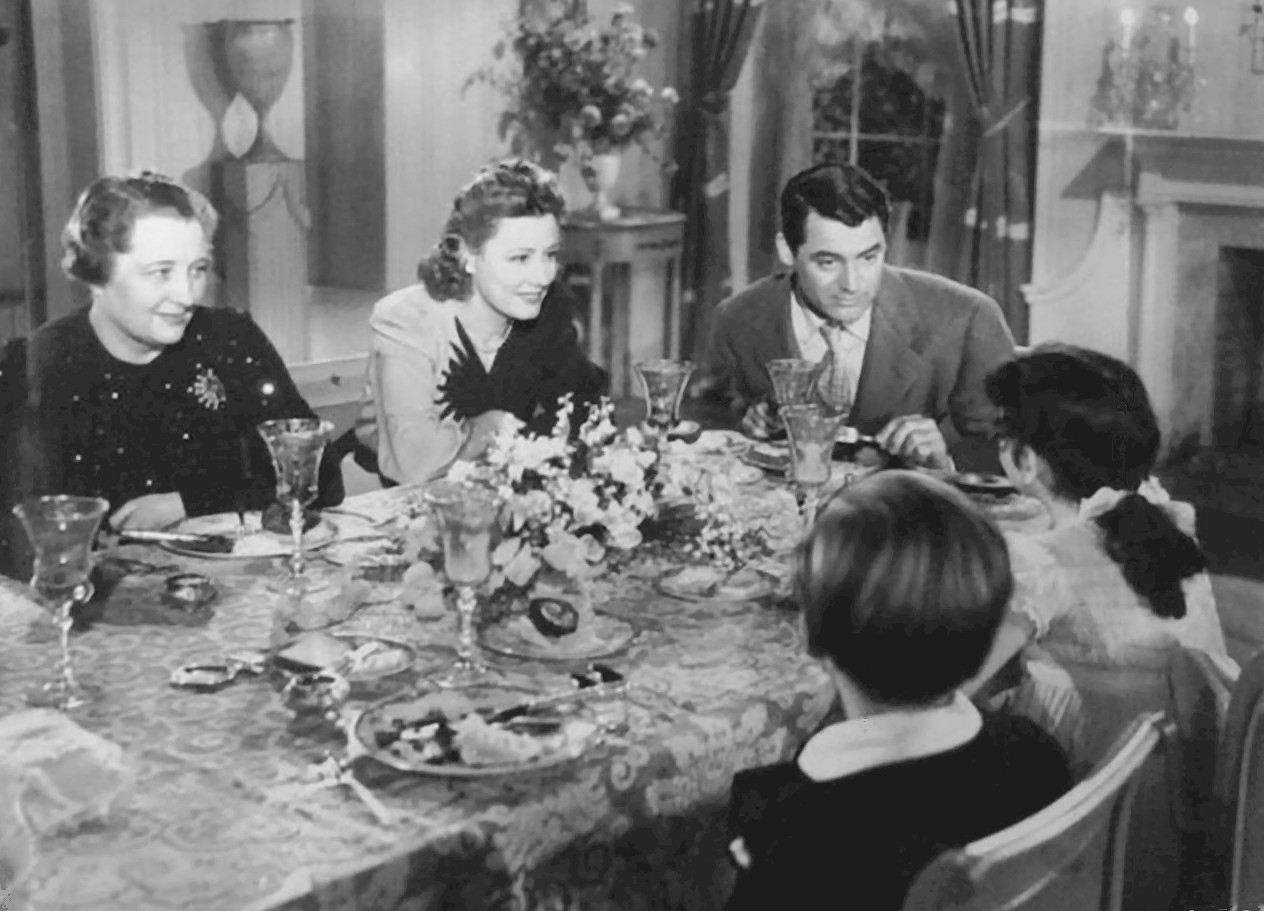
Photo from My Favorite Wife

Ellen tracks Nick down before his honeymoon night, flying to Yosemite and arriving before they do. She gets his attention in the lobby before they can get to honeymoon suite C. Using the excuse that he needs a shave, Nick sneaks down to the lobby.

Nick and Ellen reunite in the lobby and he books her into suite A so they can talk privately. Promising to tell Bianca, he leaves. As Nick is at a loss as to how to break the news, he continually puts off the unpleasant task. He calls Bianca from the lobby phone but she catches him in the lie.

Everyone heads back to the Arden home. Ellen arrives by plane so is able to spend the day with the children before Nick and Bianca arrive by car. Ellen claims to be a friend from the south, and Nick’s apparent closeness with her upsets Bianca.

Further complications ensue when an insurance adjuster mentions to Nick a rumor that Ellen was not alone on the island, but had the company of Stephen Burkett, and that they called each other "Adam" and "Eve". When Nick confronts Ellen, she recruits a mousy shoe salesman to pretend to be Stephen, but Nick has already tracked down the real Stephen, who is athletic and handsome. Upon finding out that Nick has remarried, Stephen declares his love for Ellen, and the two men argue over her, but she rebuffs them both.

Meanwhile, Bianca becomes frustrated by Nick's odd behavior (especially the nonconsummation of their marriage) and calls in a psychiatrist, Dr. Kohlmar. Nick awkwardly tries to explain the situation, but they do not believe him, until he is arrested on a charge of bigamy. In court, Judge Bryson, the same judge who had Ellen declared legally dead and married Nick and Bianca, annuls the second marriage. By this time, Ellen is no longer sure of Nick's feelings for her. Stephen asks her to marry him and return with him to the island, but she still loves Nick.

Nick suggests that Ellen and the children go to their mountain home for a while. Since her license has expired, he convinces her to let him drive them. She tries to tell the children that she is their mother, but they have already figured that out. After Ellen gives Nick a hard time over his reluctance to admit what he feels, he tosses Bianca aside, and he and Ellen are reconciled.

== Cast ==
- Irene Dunne as Ellen Arden
- Cary Grant as Nick Arden
- Randolph Scott as Stephen Burkett
- Gail Patrick as Bianca Bates
- Ann Shoemaker as Ma, Nick's mother
- Scotty Beckett as Tim, the Ardens' son
- Mary Lou Harrington as Chinch, the Ardens' daughter
- Donald MacBride as hotel clerk
- Hugh O'Connell as Johnson, the insurance adjuster
- Granville Bates as Judge Bryson
- Pedro de Cordoba as Dr. Kohlmar
- Chester Clute as the shoe salesman (uncredited)

== Production ==
After the great success of The Awful Truth (1937), McCarey signed Cary Grant and Irene Dunne for the film without a script. He was to have directed My Favorite Wife, as well, but after his near-fatal car accident, Garson Kanin was assigned as director. "On My Favorite Wife," recalled Gail Patrick, "we were desperately trying to be funny as our producer, Leo McCarey, lay at death's door from an automobile crash. He recovered, but I never thought we entered into the spirit of that one. We couldn't—we were waiting for bulletins from the hospital." A number of pre-production conferences took place in the hospital, and McCarey recovered sufficiently to visit the set two or three weeks into filming.

When the shooting was finished, McCarey edited the film, and a preview was arranged. McCarey later recalled, "after about five reels, the picture took a dip, and for about two reels or more, it wasn't as funny as what preceded it ... it was a lot of unraveling of a tricky plot." A second preview confirmed that the film broke down at the same point.

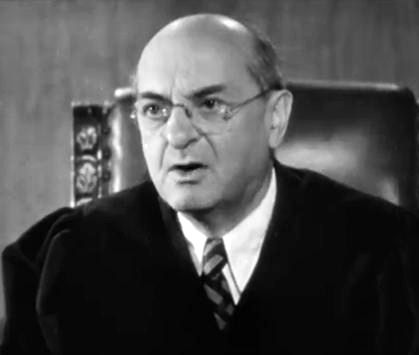
Granville Bates as Judge Bryson

So the cast was dismissed, the writers went home, the director went back to New York, and I sat there with the cutter trying to figure out what to do to save the picture. ... Then I got the wildest idea I ever had. There was a judge in the opening who was very funny, and he dropped out of the picture, and I decided to bring him back. What we actually did was to tell the judge our story problems in the picture and have him comment on them. And it was truly great. It became the outstanding thing in the picture.

McCarey brought Kanin and one of the other writers back, and wrote the judge's dialogue himself—with help from Gail Patrick, who had studied law. (Patrick later was the Executive Producer of the long-running Perry Mason TV series in the 1950s and 1960s). One reel was shot and two or three were pulled. When the film was previewed again, it worked.

Patrick later said she felt that the resolution of the film should have included a romance between her character, Bianca, and Stephen Burkett (Randolph Scott). "I suggested that," Patrick said, "but the director [Garson Kanin] said I was going too far."

The honeymoon scenes take place in Yosemite National Park and sets were designed to look like The Ahwahnee Hotel.

== Reception ==
My Favorite Wife was RKO's second-biggest hit of 1940, after Kitty Foyle, earning a profit of $505,000.

The New York Sun described the film as "built for straight fun. It goes in for giggles, chuckles, and raised eyebrows....'My Favorite Wife' is gay, brittle, amusing farce."

"Both in theme and execution, My Favorite Wife was a quasisequel to The Awful Truth," wrote RKO studio chronicler Richard B. Jewell in 1982. "The film peaked about two-thirds of the way along and began to wear thin near the end, yet still contained a number of inspired scenes."

In 1991, Pauline Kael assessed My Favorite Wife as "the most famous and the funniest" modern version of Tennyson's story "Enoch Arden" (1864). She wrote "Garson Kanin was 27 (and at his liveliest) when he directed this screwball-classic hit".

== Award nominations ==
Bella and Sam Spewak and Leo McCarey were nominated for the Academy Award for Best Story, Roy Webb for Best Score, and Van Nest Polglase and Mark-Lee Kirk for Best Art Direction.

== Radio adaptations ==
My Favorite Wife was adapted for a 60-minute radio broadcast of Lux Radio Theater on December 9, 1940; Laurence Olivier as Nick Arden and Rosalind Russell as Ellen Arden. Gail Patrick reprised her film role. The March 23, 1941, broadcast of The Screen Guild Theater presented a 30-minute adaptation of the film, with Dunne reprising her role and Robert Montgomery as Nick Arden. Four years later, on November 12, 1945, the same show presented another 30-minute adaptation, this time with Patrick once again reprising her role.

It was also adapted for the October 31, 1941, airing of Philip Morris Playhouse; Madeleine Carroll and Burgess Meredith starred in this adaptation. The broadcast does not survive in radio collections.

Grant and Dunne also reprised their roles when the movie was adapted for the December 7, 1950, broadcast of Screen Director's Playhouse.

== Film remakes ==
20th Century Fox began filming a 1962 remake starring Marilyn Monroe, Dean Martin, and Cyd Charisse under the working title of Something's Got to Give, which was to be directed by George Cukor. Monroe died after filming began and Martin backed out when the studio attempted to recast Monroe's role with Lee Remick. A recreation of surviving footage cobbled from the unfinished Something's Got to Give exists, along with some scenes reshot with Remick.

In 1963, 20th Century Fox remade the film as Move Over, Darling, starring Doris Day and James Garner.

Cary Grant's scene in the elevator—seeing his first wife, Irene Dunne—was repeated in "Move Over, Darling" and was remade in a similar scene of the 1998 film The Parent Trap, in which Dennis Quaid, in an elevator, sees his separated wife, Natasha Richardson.

== See also ==
- Beyond (1921)
- Too Many Husbands, a 1940 romantic comedy film about a woman who loses her husband in a boating accident and remarries, only to have her first spouse reappear—yet another variation on the poem "Enoch Arden".
- Three for the Show, a 1955 musical comedy remake of Too Many Husbands, starring Betty Grable, Jack Lemmon, Gower Champion and Marge Champion
