= Elvis & Nixon =

- Theatrical release poster
- Directed by: Liza Johnson
- Written by: Joey Sagal; Hanala Sagal; Cary Elwes
- Produced by: Holly Wiersma; Cassian Elwes; Cary Elwes
- Starring: Michael Shannon; Kevin Spacey; Alex Pettyfer; Johnny Knoxville; Colin Hanks; Evan Peters; Sky Ferreira; Tracy Letts; Tate Donovan; Ashley Benson
- Cinematography: Terry Stacey
- Edited by: Michael Taylor; Sabine Hoffman
- Music by: Ed Shearmur
- Production companies: Autumn Productions; Elevated Films; Holly Wiersma Productions; Johnny Mac & David Hansen Productions; Benaroya Pictures
- Distributed by: Amazon Studios; Bleecker Street
- Release dates: April 18, 2016 (Tribeca); April 22, 2016 (United States); April 29, 2016 (United Kingdom)
- Running time: 86 minutes
- Country: United States
- Language: English
- Budget: $9.8 million
- Box office: $1.8 million

Elvis & Nixon is a 2016 American comedy-drama film directed by Liza Johnson and written by Joey Sagal, Hanala Sagal, and Cary Elwes. The film stars Michael Shannon as singer Elvis Presley and Kevin Spacey as President Richard Nixon, and focuses on the December 21, 1970, meeting between the two men at the White House. The film also stars Alex Pettyfer, Johnny Knoxville, Colin Hanks, and Evan Peters. The film was released on April 22, 2016, by Amazon Studios and Bleecker Street.

== Plot ==
On the morning of December 21, 1970, actor-singer Elvis Presley arrives at the White House and requests an urgent meeting with President Richard Nixon. Presley opposes the drug culture, the hippie movement, SDS, and the Black Panther Party; he wants Nixon to swear him in as an undercover agent in the Bureau of Narcotics and Dangerous Drugs.

Two of Nixon's senior aides, Dwight Chapin and Egil Krogh, set up a meeting between the two men. At first, Nixon is annoyed by what he sees as a PR stunt, but over the course of the meeting finds that they have much in common: they are both self-made men who came from humble beginnings and worked hard for their success, and they both feel unappreciated by an American culture they no longer understand.

They pose for an iconic photograph and part on good terms.

== Cast ==
- Michael Shannon as Elvis Presley
- Kevin Spacey as President Richard Nixon
- Alex Pettyfer as Jerry Schilling
- Johnny Knoxville as Sonny West
- Colin Hanks as Bud Krogh
- Evan Peters as Dwight Chapin
- Tate Donovan as White House Chief of Staff H. R. Haldeman
- Sky Ferreira as Charlotte
- Tracy Letts as John Finlator
- Ahna O'Reilly as Mary Anne Peterson
- Ashley Benson as Margaret (Ticket Agent)
- Dylan Penn as Diane (Hotel Staffer)
- Joey Sagal as Joe King
- Geraldine Singer as Rose Mary Woods
- Hanala Sagal as Chapin's Secretary
- Poppy Delevingne as Stewardess #4

== Production ==
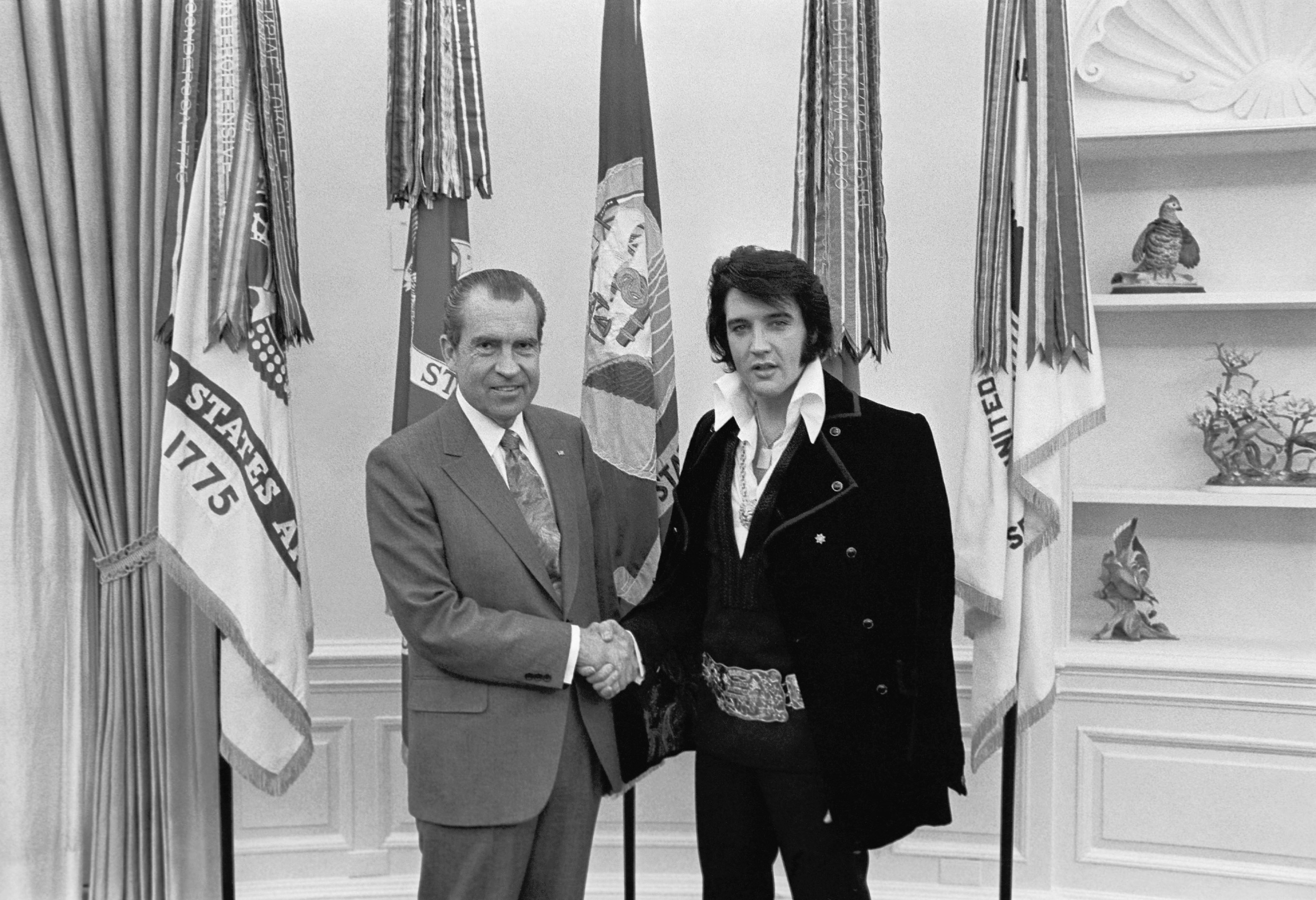
Nixon and Presley in the Oval Office on December 21, 1970.

On November 5, 2014, it was announced that Kevin Spacey and Michael Shannon signed on to portray Richard Nixon and Elvis Presley respectively in a feature film entitled Elvis & Nixon, written by Joey Sagal, Hanala Sagal and Cary Elwes, about the pair's famous meeting at the White House in 1970. On November 11, Sony Pictures Worldwide Acquisitions brought the film to the market. On January 16, 2015, five actors joined the cast, including Colin Hanks, Johnny Knoxville, Alex Pettyfer, Tracy Letts and Sky Ferreira. Pettyfer plays Elvis' best friend Jerry Schilling, who goes to Washington, D.C., with him, Hanks plays Egil Krogh, lawyer and official of President's administration, Knoxville plays Elvis' head of security, while Ferreira plays Jerry's love interest. On February 4, four more cast members included Ashley Benson, Tate Donovan, Poppy Delevingne, and Dylan Penn. Benson plays an American Airlines worker, Donovan plays White House Chief of Staff H. R. Haldeman, Delevingne plays a stewardess flying with Elvis to D.C., while Penn would be playing a hotel worker.

Principal photography began on January 12, 2015, in New Orleans, Louisiana. The filming also took place in Shreveport, Louisiana and Los Angeles, California.

Co-writer Joey Sagal who has previously played Elvis Presley as an actor on stage, and in films and television, had in his childhood met Presley when his father — Boris Sagal — directed Presley in 1965's Girl Happy.

== Release ==
On November 11, 2014, it was announced that Sony Pictures Worldwide Acquisitions had acquired distribution rights to the film for Latin America, Eastern Europe, Scandinavia, Iceland, Spain, Portugal, and pan-Asian television, with other territories going to companies such as Entertainment One for Australia and the United Kingdom. On June 23, 2015, it was announced Amazon Studios had acquired the film for $4 million, the film marked their first official film acquisition. Bleecker Street would release the film theatrically prior to the film being released on Amazon. The film was presented at the 2016 Tribeca Film Festival in March 2016. The film was released in the United States on April 22, 2016, 22 years to the day of Nixon's death. The film was released in the United Kingdom on April 29, 2016.

== Reception ==
=== Box office ===
Elvis & Nixon has grossed $1.1 million in the United States and Canada, and $711,419 in other territories, for a worldwide total of $1.8 million, sales of its DVD/Blu-ray releases have cashed $173,101, against a production budget of $4 million.

=== Critical response ===
On review aggregator Rotten Tomatoes the film has a rating of 76% based on 156 reviews and an average rating of 6.48/10. The site's critical consensus reads, "Elvis & Nixon may not do much to expand on its absurdly iconic photographic source material, but it's rarely less than engaging thanks to its talented starring duo." On Metacritic, the film has a score of 59 out of 100 based on 37 reviews, indicating "mixed or average" reviews.

Radio Times gave the film an average review but praised the acting: "Michael Shannon is an enjoyably left-field choice for a jaded, increasingly alienated Presley; he’s grown weary of the persona he has to tiresomely maintain, seems to be losing the plot, and yet still creates a stir wherever he treads. Assigned less screen time, Nixon is a more enigmatic figure: gruff, stubborn, and played to perfection by Kevin Spacey. ... Shannon and Spacey are a hoot in an entertaining if unenlightening effort". Flickering Myth enjoyed the film: “Elvis & Nixon is an entirely pleasant 86 minutes in the cinema – entertaining, humorous and well-made, albeit somewhat forgettable. Also, it’s further proof that a female director can harness the energy of two top male thespians portraying macho men.” What's Worth Seeing also liked the film, writing: "With Michael Shannon as the gun-toting rock-and-roll star and Kevin Spacey as the President, more famous for his downfall a couple of years ahead, director Liza Johnson delivers an unexpectedly sharp, funny and zippy real-life tale of absurdity which would have been surreal beyond measure for everyone involved – except for The King himself." Nigel M. Smith of The Guardian called the film “a breezy comedy nimbly directed” and wrote: "Given that the film is about two of the most recognizable figures of the 20th century, clearly casting is key to its success. Luckily, Johnson hit the jackpot by getting Michael Shannon on board as the King and Kevin Spacey to play the corrupt president."

== See also ==
- Elvis Meets Nixon (1997 film)
