= Some Things Are Better Left Unsaid =

Some Things Are Better Left Unsaid may refer to:

- a 1964 song by Ketty Lester
- a song from the 1984 Daryl Hall and John Oates album Big Bam Boom
- a song from the 1994 Katey Sagal album Well...
