= Enoch Arden =

1864 poem by Alfred, Lord Tennyson

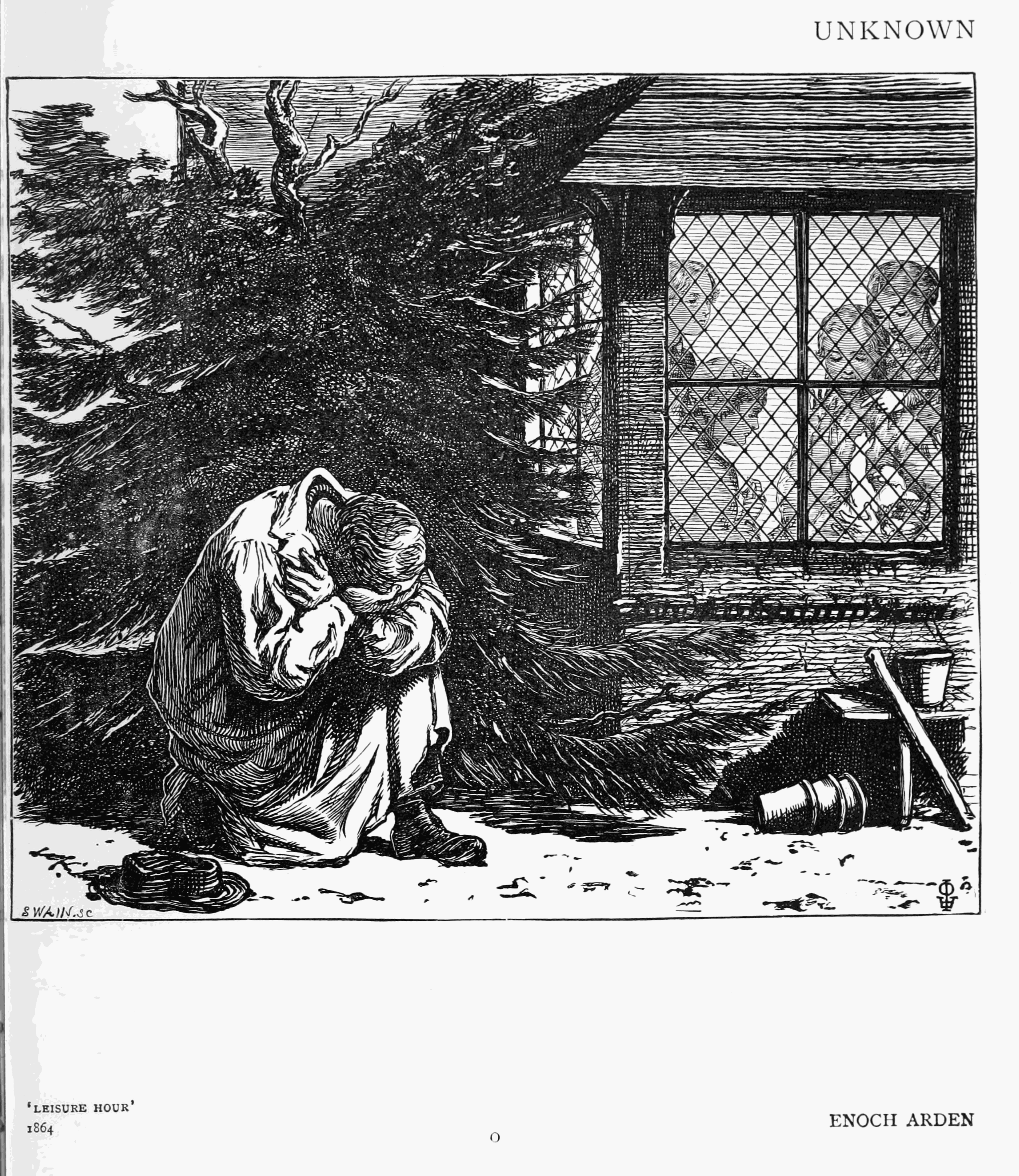
Illustration for "Enoch Arden" in The Leisure Hour (1864)

Enoch Arden is a narrative poem by Alfred, Lord Tennyson, published in 1864 during his tenure as British poet laureate. The story on which it was based was allegedly provided to Tennyson by Thomas Woolner. The poem lends its name to a principle in law that after being missing for a certain number of years (typically seven) a person may be declared dead for purposes of remarriage and inheritance of their survivors.

== Background ==
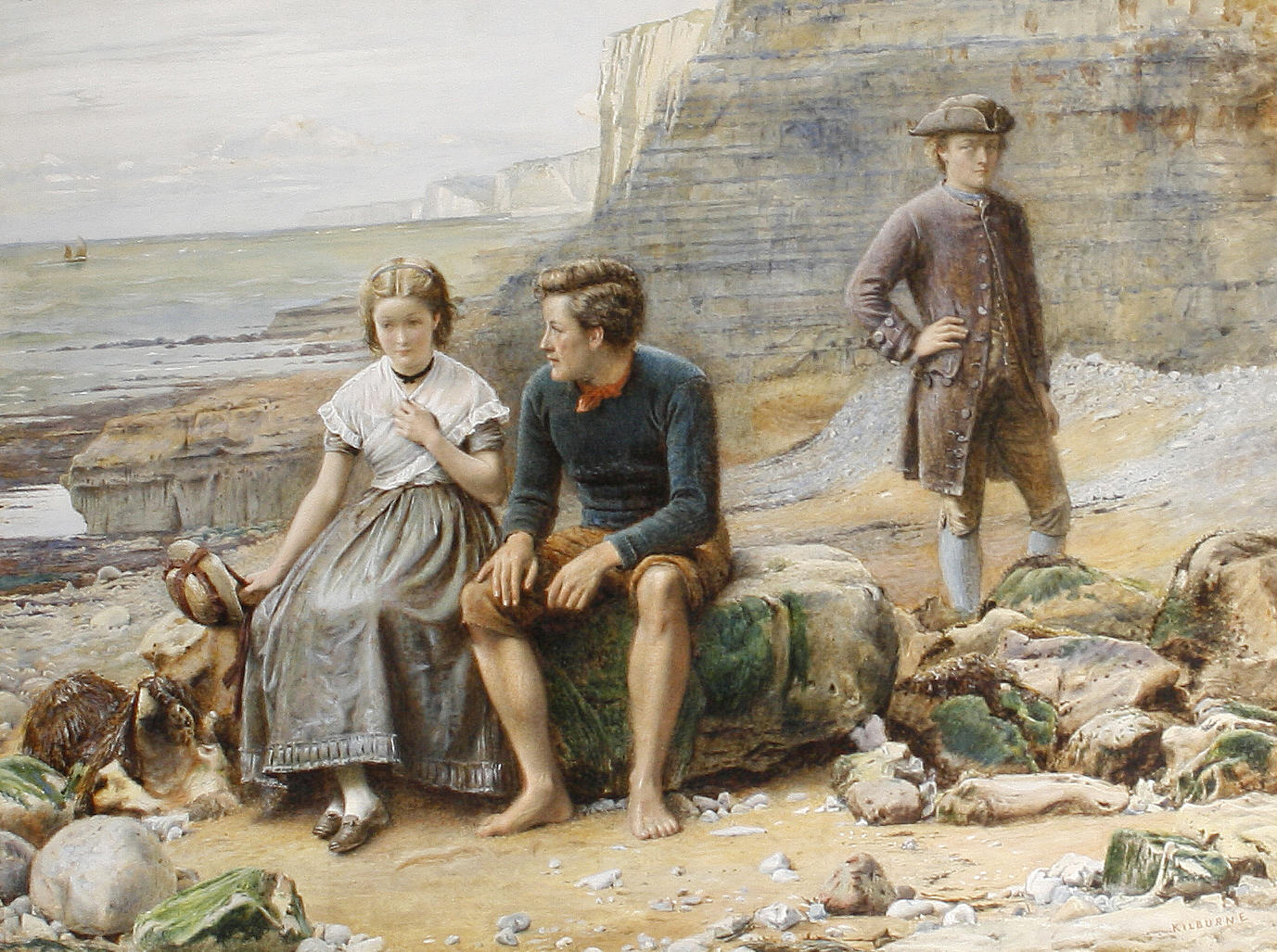
Enoch Arden (watercolour painting by George Goodwin Kilburne)

Fisherman-turned-merchant sailor Enoch Arden, having lost his job due to an accident, sacrifices comfort and the companionship of his wife Annie and three children, by going to sea with his old captain to better support his beloved family. During the voyage, Enoch is shipwrecked on a desert island with two companions who eventually die. (This part of the story is reminiscent of Robinson Crusoe.) Enoch remains lost for eleven and half years. Ten years after Enoch's disappearance, Phillip Ray––a mutual friend––asks Annie Arden to marry him, stating that it is obvious Enoch is dead. It was not unusual for 18th-century merchant ships to remain at sea for months or years, but there was always news of a ship's whereabouts by way of other ships that had communicated with it. Phillip reminds Annie that there has been no word of Enoch's ship. Annie asks Phillip to agree to wait a year. A year passes, and Phillip proposes to Annie again. She puts him off for another half-year. Annie reads her Bible and asks for a sign as to whether Enoch is dead or alive. She dreams of Enoch being on a desert island which she misinterprets as heaven. She marries Phillip and they have a child.

Enoch finds upon his return from the sea that his wife is married happily to his childhood friend and rival and has a child by him. Enoch's life remains unfulfilled, with one of his own children now dead and his wife and remaining children now being cared for by another man.

Enoch never reveals to his wife and children that he is really alive, as he loves her too much to spoil her new happiness. Enoch dies of a broken heart.

The use of the name Enoch for a man who disappears from the lives of his loved ones is likely inspired by the biblical character Enoch. In fact, also the entire chronological structure of the protagonist's life with its cycles related to the biblical symbolism of the "days of Creation" binds to the name of Enoch, as demonstrated by the analysis of an Italian thinker long interested in this work, and denotes Tennyson's ability to insert theological intentions into simple elegiac mode with an unprecedented complexity in English literature.

== Musical settings ==
In 1897, Richard Strauss set the poem as a recitation for speaker and piano, published as his Op. 38. On 24 May 1962, Columbia Records released a recording of Enoch Arden (recorded 2–4 October 1961) with Glenn Gould on the piano and Claude Rains as the speaker. The LP was made at a cost of $1500, and only 2000 copies were released. It remains a collector's item. In 2010, Chad Bowles and David Ripley released a CD, and in 2020 a recording was made in German by pianist Kirill Gerstein and Swiss actor Bruno Ganz. Conductor Emil de Cou arranged a version for chamber orchestra and narrator. This was performed with the Virginia Chamber Orchestra and actor Gary Sloan in 2010. The British actor Christopher Kent and pianist Gamal Khamis performed a semi-staged livestream performance during the 2020 lockdown and subsequently recorded a critically acclaimed CD for SOMM Recordings, which was released in 2022.

The poem is also the basis of the opera of the same name by composer Ottmar Gerster and librettist Karl von Levetzow, which had its premiere in Düsseldorf on 15 November 1936.

== In popular culture ==
- In Evelyn Sharp's 1897 children's novel The Making of a Schoolgirl, the girls put on a play of Enoch Arden for a student's birthday.
- The Guy de Maupassant story "Le Retour" has a similar plot.
- Enoch Arden, the 1911 film directed by D. W. Griffith, is based on this poem.
- The 1915 film of the same name was directed by Christy Cabanne.
- The 1925 Australian film The Bushwhackers is based on this poem.
- Franklin Wescott in the 1936 novel Anne of Windy Poplars, the fourth book in the Anne of Green Gables series, says, "Those last two lines in Enoch Arden made me so mad one night, I did fire the book through the window. But I picked it up the next day for the sake of the Bugle Song."
- The 1940 comedy film Too Many Husbands was based on the story, with Jean Arthur playing the wife of the returning husband, played by Fred MacMurray. It was remade in 1955 as Three for the Show, with Betty Grable, Jack Lemmon, Marge Champion and Gower Champion.
- The 1940 screwball comedy film My Favorite Wife is a comic inversion of Enoch Arden.
- Agatha Christie referenced the poem in three stories. "While the Light Lasts", a short story first published in The Novel Magazine in April 1924, has its protagonist Tim Nugent suffer the same chain of events as did Arden. The same plot arc was used, to greater effect, as part of Giant's Bread (1930), the first of six novels written by Christie under the pseudonym of Mary Westmacott.. Finally, in the crime novel Taken at the Flood (1948), the character Robert Underhay is lost in the South African bush and presumed dead; A character uses the pseudonym "Enoch Arden" as he attempts to blackmail Underhay's wife Rosaleen and her new family.
- The 1946 film Tomorrow Is Forever, starring Claudette Colbert, Orson Welles and George Brent, is based on the poem, although no writing or adaptation credit is given to Tennyson.
- In the 1947 novel The Sleeping Sphinx by mystery writer John Dickson Carr, Major Sir Donald Holden is told to stop thinking of himself as Enoch Arden when he returns to London 15 months after being reported dead.
- The 1951 Hindi film Saagar is an adaptation of Enoch Arden.
- Move Over, Darling is a 1963 remake of My Favorite Wife, starring Doris Day, James Garner and Polly Bergen. This project was undertaken after the 1962 Marilyn Monroe version, Something's Got to Give, was aborted upon Monroe's death.
- The 1966 Konkani film Nirmon is based on this story.
- The 1967 Hindi film Taqdeer was a remake of the Konkani film Nirmon.
- The 2000 film Cast Away was loosely based on this story.

== See also ==
- 1864 in poetry
