= Double Trouble (American TV series) =

- Publicity shot of the Sagal twins
- Genre: Sitcom
- Created by: David W. Duclon; Robert Illes; James R. Stein
- Starring: Jean Sagal; Liz Sagal
- Composers: Ray Colcord; Mark Snow
- Country of origin: United States
- Original language: English
- No. of seasons: 2
- No. of episodes: 23

Production
- Executive producers: Jack Elinson; Bernie Orenstein; Bill Richmond; Saul Turteltaub; Don Reo; Judith Allison
- Producers: Robert Illes; Janis Hirsch
- Camera setup: Multi-camera
- Running time: 22–24 minutes
- Production company: Embassy Television

Original release
- Network: NBC
- Release: April 4, 1984 – March 30, 1985

Double Trouble is an American sitcom television series that aired on NBC from April 4, 1984 to March 30, 1985. The series stars identical twins Jean and Liz Sagal as Kate and Allison Foster, two teenagers living under the watchful eye of their widowed father. The show was considered an updating of the "twins in mischief" concept seen in films like The Parent Trap or The Patty Duke Show of the 1960s.

== Synopsis ==
Double Trouble premiered in April 1984. Initially, the series was set in Des Moines, Iowa, and generally revolved around the twins' high school, or their work as dance instructors at their father's gym (thus giving the girls a chance to show off their real-life dancing skills). Donnelly Rhodes co-starred as the girls' widowed father, Art Foster. Much of the comedy was generated from the twins' opposite personalities. Allison — who usually wore a ponytail — was more serious, while Kate — who usually wore her hair down — was more laid-back and happy-go-lucky. There was also some comedy derived from their father's chemistry with his business partner and late wife's best friend Beth McConnell (Patricia Richardson) and their attempts to start a relationship. The Sagal sisters acknowledged that Norman Lear, the Sagal family's godfather, was the one who held influence over the show's concept.

When the series was brought back for a second season, it was an entirely different series. The twins had graduated high school, and now lived in New York City with their aunt Margo (Barbara Barrie). The series was not renewed after the second season, but it was seen in reruns on NBC until August 21, 1985, and for several years on USA Network in the late 1980s and early 1990s.

== Cast ==
- Jean Sagal as Kate Foster
- Liz Sagal as Allison Foster
- Donnelly Rhodes as Art Foster (season 1, guest season 2)
- Patricia Richardson as Beth McConnell (season 1)
- Barbara Barrie as Margo Foster (season 2)
- Michael D. Roberts as Mr. Arrechia (season 2)
- Jonathan Schmock as Billy Batalato (season 2)
- James Vallely as Charles Kincaid (season 2)

=== Recurring ===
- Jon Caliri as Michael Gillette (season 1)
- Evonne Kezios as Naomi (season 1)
- Anne-Marie Johnson as Aileen Lewis (season 2)

== Episodes ==
=== Series overview ===
Season	Episodes	Originally released	
Season	Episodes	First released	Last released
1	8	April 4, 1984	May 30, 1984
2	15	December 1, 1984	March 30, 1985

=== Season 1 (1984) ===
No. overall	No. in season	Title	Directed by	Written by	Original release date	Prod. code
1	1	"One Drives, the Other Doesn't"	Marlena Laird	Story by : Robert Illes & James Stein & Saul Turteltaub & Bernie Orenstein; Teleplay by : Saul Turteltaub & Bernie Orenstein	April 4, 1984	005
Kate's inability to pass her driving test doesn't stop her from taking Art's car — and Allison's driver's license — to a concert.
2	2	"Lust"	Jim Drake	Jill Gordon & Susan Jane Lindner	April 11, 1984	004
Kate risks the wrath of both her sister and her boyfriend when she becomes smitten by a guy working out at the gym.
3	3	"First Day"	John Bowab	Deidre Fay & Stuart Wolpert	April 18, 1984	008
After she transfers to Allison's school, Allison helps Kate adjust by adding her to the yearbook staff; within a week, Kate's rising toward the top of its masthead.
4	4	"Bad Chemistry"	John Bowab	Kimberly Hill	April 25, 1984	009
Kate's out of her element when filling in for Allison in Chemistry class.
5	5	"Dueling Feet"	Marlena Laird	Emily Potter	May 2, 1984	007
Kate challenges Allison to join her in a televised dance contest, but an ankle sprain forces one of them to go it alone.
6	6	"Separate Birthdays"	Marlena Laird	Story by : David Chambers & Saul Turteltaub & Bernie Orenstein; Teleplay by : Saul Turteltaub & Bernie Orenstein	May 16, 1984	006
After Kate pulls her into a "twin testing" science project, Allison seeks an identity away from her sister by moving in with Beth and celebrating their birthday by herself.
7	7	"Heartache"	Jim Drake	Jill Gordon and Susan Jane Lindner	May 23, 1984	002
Art panics when he discovers Allison's diary, and reads and entry indicating her passion for heartthrob Steven.
8	8	"Bombshell"	Jim Drake	Robert Illes, James Stein & Janis Hirsch	May 30, 1984	003
Tired of Art being in their business, the twins plan to set him up with their mother's friend Karen (Linda Kaye Henning), who is in town visiting. Unaware of their plans, Art arranges a special family dinner with Beth to reveal their relationship to the girls.

=== Season 2 (1984–85) ===
No. overall	No. in season	Title	Directed by	Written by	Original release date
9	1	"If We Can Make It Here..."	Jim Drake	Don Reo	December 1, 1984
The girls make their move to New York City, settling in with their Aunt Margo and setting out toward their respective ambitions (Kate as an entertainer, Allison as a fashion designer).
10	2	"Do You Believe in Magic?"	Jim Drake	Janis Hirsch	December 8, 1984
Kate becomes assistant to Rollo the Great (Carl Ballantine), a magician whose next big trick is to make Kate appear in two places at once.
11	3	"Dream Girls"	John Pasquin	Lissa Levin	December 15, 1984
Kate joins a rock star's concert tour, leaving an envious Allison back in New York.
12	4	"O Come All Ye Faithful"	John Pasquin	Janis Hirsch	December 22, 1984
With bad weather precluding a trip home, the girls set up a holiday party at Margo's, a to-do Allison hopes Mr. Arrechia can attend.
13	5	"Man for Margo"	John Pasquin	Bill Richmond	January 5, 1985
Sensing that Margo deserves someone who'll show her a good time, Charles and Kate set her up on a date with the most charming man money can buy.
14	6	"The Boy Next Door"	Ellen Chaset Falcon	Lissa Levin	January 12, 1985
Expecting to not win, Margo consents to Allison and Billy attending an awards banquet in her stead; sparks between the two soon fly.
15	7	"Memories"	Don Reo	Judith D. Allison	January 19, 1985
Footage from Season 1 contributes to Kate and Allison's recollections of back home.
16	8	"Two Girls for Every Boy"	Ellen Chaset Falcon	Lissa Levin	January 26, 1985
Kate hears wedding bells after meeting a radio DJ whose tastes are more in line with Allison's.
17	9	"The Write Stuff"	Linda Day	Janis Hirsch	February 2, 1985
Allison submits a newspaper article, which attracts enough compliments to spur her into forsaking design school for a writing career.
18	10	"Commercial Break"	Ellen Chaset Falcon	Bill Richmond	February 9, 1985
Kate loses her voice on the eve of a commercial audition; reluctantly, Allison agrees to fill in... and her talents get her sister the part.
19	11	"Old Movies"	Ellen Chaset Falcon	Don Reo	February 16, 1985
Late-night movie watching inspires the housemates to imagine themselves in some of cinema's greatest scenes.
20	12	"September Song"	Ellen Chaset Falcon	Perry Grant & Dick Bensfield	February 23, 1985
Allison becomes smitten with a much older man, but Margo thinks his asking Allison to join him on a trip to Paris is too big of a step.
21	13	"Funny Girl"	Judi Elterman	Janis Hirsch	March 2, 1985
A wealthy new classmate (Mindy Cohn) strikes a friendship with Allison; before long, she's also stealing her design ideas.
22	14	"The Day of the Rose"	Ellen Chaset Falcon	Perry Grant and Dick Bensfield	March 23, 1985
After an anniversary gift from her late husband makes Margo melancholy, the twins spend the weekend cheering her up, but an out-of-town trip doesn't turn out as the trio hoped it would.
23	15	"Where's Poppa?"	Ellen Chaset Falcon	Don Reo & Judith D. Allison	March 30, 1985
Art pays his daughters a visit... and, after seeing their life in the Big Apple, prefers that they come back to Iowa with him.

== U.S. television ratings ==
Season	Episodes	Start date	End date	Nielsen rank	Nielsen rating
1983-84	8	March 4, 1984	May 30, 1984	71	13.1
1984-85	15	December 1, 1984	March 30, 1985	43	13.8 (Note: Tied with "The Dukes of Hazzard" and "TJ Hooker")
