= Trial (film) =

1955 drama film directed by Mark Robson

- Directed by: Mark Robson
- Written by: Don M. Mankiewicz
- Based on: Trial a 1955 novel by Don M. Mankiewicz
- Produced by: Charles Schnee
- Starring: Glenn Ford; Dorothy McGuire; Arthur Kennedy
- Cinematography: Robert Surtees
- Edited by: Albert Akst
- Music by: Daniele Amfitheatrof
- Production company: Metro-Goldwyn-Mayer
- Distributed by: Loews, Inc.
- Release date: October 7, 1955
- Running time: 105 or 109 minutes
- Country: United States
- Language: English
- Budget: $1,341,000
- Box office: $3,305,000

Trial is a 1955 American legal drama film directed by Mark Robson and starring Glenn Ford, Dorothy McGuire, and Arthur Kennedy. It features John Hodiak, Katy Jurado, Rafael Campos, and Juano Hernandez.

Adapted by Don Mankiewicz from his own novel of the same name, the story concerns the trial of a Mexican boy accused of rape and murder who is initially victimized by prejudiced accusers, and then becomes a pawn of his communist defender, whose propagandist purposes would be best served by a guilty verdict.

== Plot ==
On the evening of June 7, 1947, residents of the small California town of San Juno are celebrating an annual event called Bass Night at a local private beach. Angel Chavez, a Mexican-American teenager, wanders onto the beach and meets Marie Wiltse, a non-Hispanic girl he knows from high school, and the pair begin to kiss. Marie, whose heart has been weakened by rheumatic fever, gets nervous and starts to leave, but she suddenly collapses and dies. Angel calls out for help and is promptly arrested and charged with felony murder on the grounds that Marie's death was caused by his attempt to seduce her—which, as they are minors, would be statutory rape, even if consensual.

David Blake is a law professor at State University who is told his contract will not be renewed unless he gets some courtroom experience. After being rejected by a number of alumni of the college, Barney Castle agrees to let David work for him over the summer to handle Angel's case. The situation in San Juno is volatile, and a racist mob attempts to break Angel out of jail and lynch him, but the sheriff persuades them to stop by promising the youth will be executed after a fair trial.

Castle and Angel's mother travel to New York City to raise money to defend Angel. Castle leaves his secretary Abbe Nyle to help Blake, and they fall in love. Detectives working for Castle's firm uncover an attempt to tamper with the jury on behalf of the prosecution, resulting in a new jury being empaneled. Over a weekend break during jury selection, Castle calls Blake to New York to join him at a fundraising rally. Blake quickly realizes Castle is primarily using the case as a propaganda and fundraising tool for an American Communist group. Insulted at being used, he returns to San Juno to see the trial through to the end and represent Angel's interests.

Blake's trial strategy is to rebut the prosecution's case sufficiently that he does not need to present a defense. However, at the last moment, Castle returns and, using his influence on Angel's mother, threatens Blake with removal unless Angel testifies. Although Blake realizes that Castle wants Angel subjected to a harsh cross-examination that will ensure his conviction and execution—making him a martyr with ongoing fundraising value—he remains on the case, but the cross-examination goes as poorly as he feared. Angel is found guilty, and, since the jury did not recommend leniency, he must receive a death sentence.

Castle fires Blake to keep him from speaking during sentencing, but Blake shows up at court anyway and receives amicus status, allowing him to address the court. He argues that, since Chavez is a minor, Judge Motley can technically apply a statute intended for more trivial offenses and give Angel an indeterminate sentence to be spent at a reform school. With the consent of the prosecutor, Motley accepts the suggestion. Then Motley, who is African-American, sentences Castle, who has tried to race-bait him during Blake's argument, to 30 days in jail for contempt.

== Cast ==
- Glenn Ford as Professor David Blake
- Dorothy McGuire as Abbe Nyle, Castle's secretary
- Arthur Kennedy as Bernard "Barney" Castle
- John Hodiak as District Attorney John "Jack" Armstrong
- Katy Jurado as Consuela Chavez, Angel's mother
- Rafael Campos as Angel Chavez
- Juano Hernandez as Judge Theodore "Ted" Motley
- Robert Middleton as Sheriff A.A. "Fats" Sanders
- John Hoyt as Ralph Castillo, "an aristocratic bigot"
- Paul Guilfoyle as Cap Grant, a white supremacist
- Elisha Cook Jr. as Finn, a process server for the Battle Committee
- Ann Lee as Gail Wiltse, Marie's mother
- Whit Bissell as Sam Wiltse, Marie's father
- Richard Gaines as Dr. Johannes Schacter, Marie Wiltse's cardiologist
- Barry Kelley as Jim Brackett, chairman of the All Peoples' Party

Uncredited

- Frank Cady as Canford, a drunk witness
- Richard Tyler as Johnson, the witness with a spotlight on his car
- Everett Glass as George, the dean of State University
- Grandon Rhodes as Professor Terry Bliss
- James Todd as the minister at Marie Wiltse's funeral
- Robert Bice as Abbott, a potential juror who was part of the mob that wanted to lynch Angel
- John Maxwell as Benedict, a potential juror who has a farm without any white pickers
- Charlotte Lawrence as Eunice Webson, one of the Philadelphia 8
- Percy Helton as Youval of Free World Communications
- Frank Ferguson as Kiley, a potential juror who is a friend of Fats
- Dorothy Green as Mary Ackerman, a juror who was on a committee against segregation

== Production ==
Mankiewicz's novel won the 1954 "Harper's Prize" which included an award of $10,000 and a guarantee of publication by Harper's Publishing. He also received $25,000 from MGM for the screen rights and was hired to write the film adaptation. Mankiewicz softened the story's ending for the film and developed the love story.

Principal photography and post-production for Trial took place from early April through May 16, 1955.

The scene depicting a rally in New York City was filmed over three days in Los Angeles's Shrine Auditorium and cost $110,000. Two thousand extras were used, including 750 students from the nearby University of Southern California.

=== Production Code concerns ===
Executives at MGM were concerned that the film's script might be seen as a "subtle Communist vehicle" because of negative remarks made in the story about Senator Battle's zealous anti-Communist campaign, and the sympathetic manner in which the film dealt with a former Communist Party member, the ex-lover of the protagonist. Despite these concerns, the Production Code Administration made no objections to that material and was more concerned that the film implied that the unmarried David and Abbe spent the night together, and that they had previously had an affair. All of this material remained in the film as released.

== Reception ==
=== Critical response ===
The film received generally positive reviews, with praise for its depiction of contemporary race relations and its "historical significance". The Hollywood Reporter wrote that "every American should see it," but also "every European" since it would "prove...that Americans, in their approach to history, are not stupid, not children, and not naïve."

The review in Daily Variety suggested that if D. W. Griffith's 1915 film The Birth of a Nation, which lionized the Ku Klux Klan, "was the Negro race's greatest misfortune," then Trial might be its "greatest break in terms of a fully felt, many-sided, warm human being", praising the depiction of Judge Motley, an African American, as a "notable advance" in the presentation of Black characters.

=== Box office ===
According to MGM records, the film earned $2,312,000 in the U.S. and Canada, and $993,000 elsewhere, resulting in a profit of $518,000.

== Awards and honors ==
Award	Category	Nominee(s)	Result	Ref.
Academy Awards	Best Supporting Actor	Arthur Kennedy	Nominated	
Golden Globe Awards	Best Supporting Actor – Motion Picture	Arthur Kennedy	Won	

== See also ==
- List of American films of 1955
