= Room (Katey Sagal album) =

Studio album by Katey Sagal
- Released: June 1, 2004
- Genre: Pop, Adult Contemporary
- Label: Valley Entertainment
- Producer: Bob Thiele Jr.

Katey Sagal chronology
| Well... (1994) | Room (2004) | Covered (2013) |

Room is the second solo album (third overall album) of singer-songwriter and actress Katey Sagal. It was originally released on June 1, 2004 by the record label Valley Entertainment.

== Track listing ==
1. "Life Goes Round" (Katey Sagal, David Ricketts) 5:12
2. "Heaven Is Ten Zillion Light Years Away" (Stevie Wonder) 5:46
3. "Daddy's Girl" (Sagal, Mark Goldenberg) 4:36
4. "Love and Other Games of Chance" 5:00
5. "Feel a Whole Lot Better" (Gene Clark) 4:10
6. "Wish I Was a Kid" (Sagal, Bob Thiele Jr.) 4:31
7. "For the Love of Money" (Kenny Gamble, Leon Huff, Anthony Jackson) 3:50
8. "Catch the Wind" (Donovan) 2:48
9. "Loving Arms" (Tom Jans) 3:35
10. "I'll Be Long Gone" (Boz Scaggs) 4:11

== Personnel ==
- Katey Sagal - vocals
- Cynthia Bass, Billy Valentine - backing vocals
- Bob Thiele Jr. - acoustic, electric and nylon-string guitars, keyboards, harmonica, harmonium, organ, bass, dulcimer
- Shane Fontayne, Val McCallum - acoustic and electric guitars
- Greg Leisz - pedal steel
- Mark Goldenberg - electric banjo, electric guitars, mandolin
- John Philip Shenale - keyboards, organ, Wurlitzer, samples
- Davey Faragher, Leland Sklar - bass
- Don Was - double bass
- Victor Lawrence - cello
- Pete Thomas - drums, percussion
- Debra Dobkin - percussion
