= Phffft =

1954 film by Mark Robson

- Theatrical poster
- Directed by: Mark Robson
- Written by: George Axelrod
- Based on: Phfft: Chronicle of a Happy Divorce play by George Axelrod
- Produced by: Fred Kohlmar
- Starring: Judy Holliday; Jack Lemmon; Jack Carson; Kim Novak
- Cinematography: Charles Lang
- Edited by: Charles Nelson
- Music by: Friedrich Hollaender
- Color process: Black and white
- Production company: Columbia Pictures
- Distributed by: Columbia Pictures
- Release date: November 10, 1954 (New York City)
- Running time: 88 minutes
- Country: United States
- Language: English
- Box office: $1,550,000 (US)

Phffft is a 1954 American comedy romance film starring Judy Holliday, Jack Lemmon, and Jack Carson and featuring Kim Novak in a supporting role. The picture was written by George Axelrod and directed by Mark Robson. It was the second film starring Holliday and Lemmon that year, after It Should Happen to You.

== Plot ==
Nina and Robert Tracey (Judy Holliday and Jack Lemmon), married for eight years, suffer marital problems and divorce. Robert shares the home of his womanizing Navy buddy Charlie Nelson (Jack Carson) while Nina looks to her interfering mother for guidance.

Robert spends an evening with Janis (Kim Novak), who finds the dashing Robert "real cute", but he feels uncomfortable with Janis and other girls he dates. Nina also tries to date other men. Although they try to ignore each other when they accidentally meet, it is obvious that the past is not dead.

Then one night, they find themselves in a nightclub, dancing the mambo together; they had both learned to dance since their divorce. Later, after a disastrous meeting at her home with Charlie, Nina tells her mother on the phone that she is still in love with Robert. He accidentally overhears the conversation, having dashed to her home because of his friend's reputation.

Nina and Robert reconcile and remarry.

== Cast ==
- Judy Holliday as Nina Tracey (née Chapman)
- Jack Lemmon as Robert Tracey
- Jack Carson as Charlie Nelson
- Kim Novak as Janis
- Luella Gear as Mrs. Edith Chapman
- Donald Randolph as Dr. Van Kessel
- Donald Curtis as Rick Vidal
- Arny Freeman as Mr Anderson
- Eddie Searles as Tommy
- Merry Anders as Marsha
- Mylee Andreason as Robert's dance teacher
- Sally Mansfield as Miss Comstock
- Joyce Jameson as Secretary
- Bess Flowers as Nightclub Dance Extra
- Jimmie Dodd as Cab Driver
- Shirlee Allard as Secretary
- Wendy Howard as Artist's Model
- Charlotte Lawrence as Radio actress as Cynthia

== Production ==
The script was based on a play by George Axelrod, his follow up to The Seven Year Itch. The play was going to be tried out in late 1953 but Axelrod withdrew it on the eve of production. The writer later recalled:

At the time I was in the process of getting a divorce from my first wife. The whole thing was just too ugly and I wanted to get out of town; so, although we had the money raised, I said the play wasn't good enough and called it off. On the day this was announced, Harry Cohn, head of Columbia, called to say it would make a great movie for Judy Holliday.

Columbia bought the screen rights from him for $80,000. Axelrod went out to Hollywood for the first time to write the script - "I just loved it" - although he went back to New York for production, later saying, "At that time I regarded movies as a second career, and had that terrible New York writer's snobbery about it; take the loot and scoot was the idea."

- During filming, Jack Lemmon left the set as his first wife, actress/model Cynthia Stone gave birth to their son, Chris Lemmon.
- This was the second film in which Jack Lemmon appeared with Judy Holliday. Lemmon's debut feature film It Should Happen to You also starred Holliday.
- The title "Phffft" comes from Walter Winchell's column, which was widely syndicated during the 1950s. When a celebrity couple's marriage broke up, Winchell would describe the break-up as "phffft".
- Columbia Pictures approached George Axelrod to produce a film version of his popular play, The Seven Year Itch, but the film rights were tied up as long as it was running on Broadway. He instead offered them Phffft! - an earlier play of his dealing with a similar subject.

The original intention was to borrow Sheree North from 20th Century Fox to play the role of Janis but Harry Cohn decided to use Kim Novak after seeing her in Pushover. He told Garson Kanin, "I figured workin' alongside of Judy some of the talent, some of the magic might rub off, right? Nothing."

Jack Lemmon called it " a good film — almost a very good film."

According to Kenneth Tynan "The prospect of making" the movie sent Judy Holliday "into a fit (or phffftl) of terror, because for nearly ten years every word she had uttered on the screen had been written by the Kanins and directed by [George] Cukor. But George Axelrod and Mark Robson turned out to be admirable replacements, and her first solo flight was a reassuring success. The nervous laugh, the fugitive smile and the divine innocence were as peerless as ever."

George Axelrod later reflected:

I had a sweet, dear, darling man, Mark Robson, who hadn't a clue how to do comedy. Not a clue. I had Judy Holliday, one of the finest comedy technicians in the world, and Jack Carson, another great comedy technician, and Jack Lemmon too, but the director was miscast. Judy had a terrible time. She understood how to do the material, but Mark crushed the scenes up all the time. We were fighting the director and censorship. The seduction scene with Judy and Jack Carson—a brilliantly funny scene with these two masters—and Jack made it so erotic... Afterwards, they cut the shit out of it. The censorship destroyed it, so it wasn't even funny. Mark was an editor. He didn't understand his own limitations. Good directors come in various ways, but editors are the worst because they are interested in editing. They don't know about story. They don't know about comedy. Or even acting. They only know about having a "match."... I knew pretty much from the time we started that he was inept at comedy, that he didn't quite understand what was funny, but he was so sweet, and I didn't have any control over what we were doing.

== Awards and honors ==
- Judy Holliday was nominated for "Best Foreign Actress" at the BAFTA Awards in 1955.
- The film was also nominated for "Best Written American Comedy" at the Writers Guild of America.
