= Katey Sagal =

American actress (born 1954)

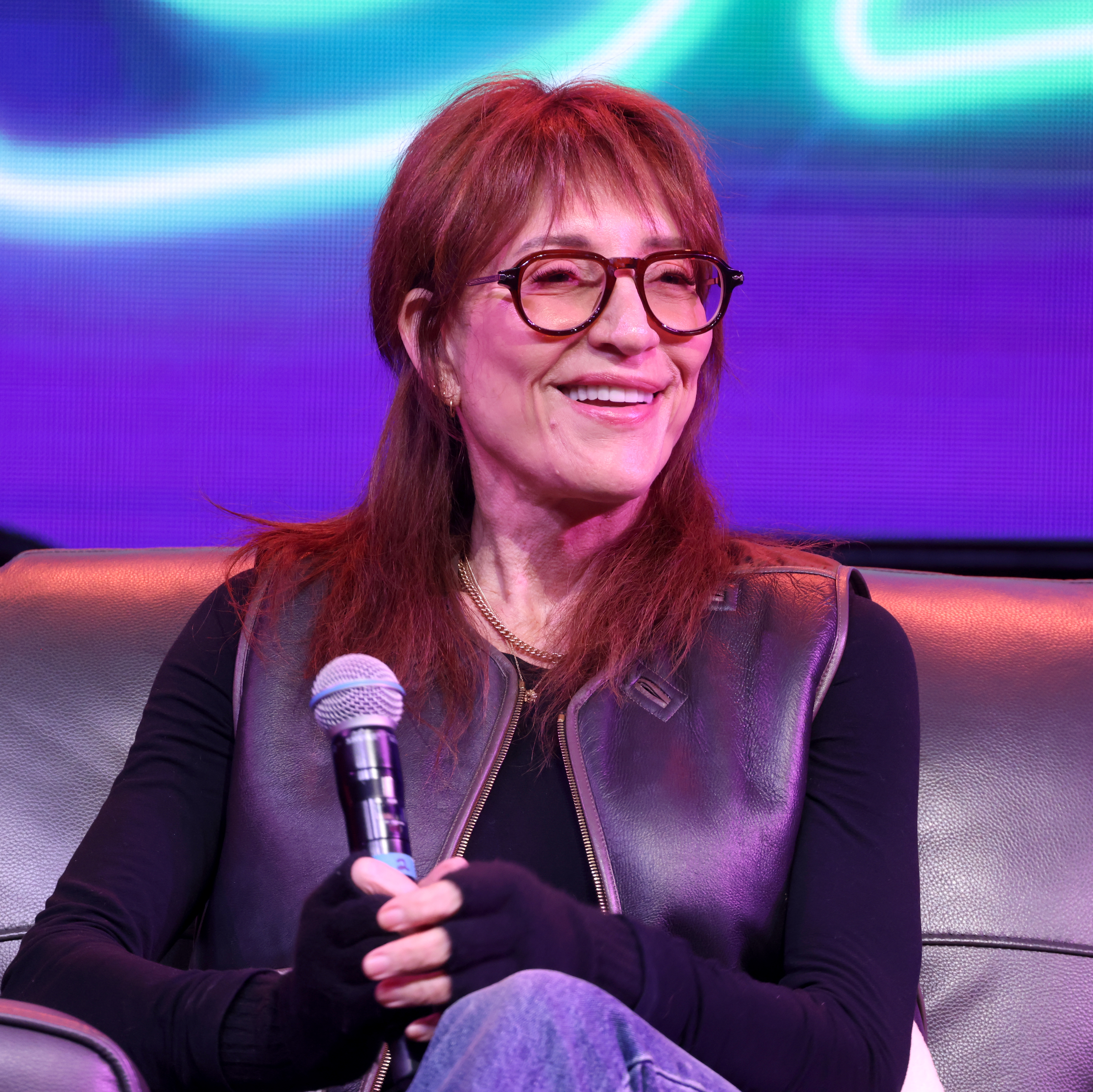
- Sagal in 2025
- Born: Catherine Louise Sagal; January 19, 1954 (age 72); Los Angeles, California, U.S.
- Education: California Institute of the Arts
- Occupations: Actress; singer
- Years active: 1971–present
- Spouses: Freddy Beckmeier (m. 1977; div. 1981); Fred Lombardo (m. 1986; div. 1989); Jack White (m. 1993; div. 2000); Kurt Sutter (m. 2004)
- Children: 3, including Jackson White
- Parent: Boris Sagal
- Relatives: Jean Sagal (sister); Liz Sagal (sister); Joey Sagal (brother); Marge Champion (stepmother); David Sagal (brother)

Catherine Louise Sagal (born January 19, 1954) is an American actress and singer. She is known for playing Peg Bundy on Married... with Children (1987–1997) for which she was thrice nominated for the Golden Globe Award for Best Actress – Television Series Musical or Comedy, Turanga Leela on Futurama (1999–2003, 2008–2013, 2023–present), Cate Hennessy on 8 Simple Rules (2002–2005), Gemma Teller Morrow on the FX series Sons of Anarchy (2008–2014), for which she won the Golden Globe Award for Best Actress – Television Series Drama in 2011 and was nominated for the TCA Award for Individual Achievement in Drama in 2010 and the Critics' Choice Television Award for Best Actress in a Drama Series in 2011 and 2012, and Louise Goldufski-Conner on The Conners (2018–2025).

== Early life ==
Sagal was born on January 19, 1954, in Los Angeles to a show business family with five children. Her mother, Sara Zwilling, was a singer (stage name Sara Macon), producer, and television writer who died of heart disease in 1975, and Sagal's father, Boris Sagal, worked as a television director. Her father was a Russian-Jewish immigrant. Her mother had Amish ancestors. In 1977, Sagal's father married dancer/actress Marge Champion, a few years before his accidental death on the set of the miniseries World War III in 1981. Three of Sagal's four siblings are actors: her younger twin sisters, Jean and Liz Sagal and brother Joey Sagal; her other brother David Sagal is an attorney married to actress McNally Sagal. Sagal and her siblings grew up in Brentwood.

Her godfather was sitcom producer and writer Norman Lear. In 2016, both Sagal and Lear acknowledged that she was not only his goddaughter, but that he also introduced her parents to each other. Sagal has described herself as "culturally Jewish" but with no "formal religious experience."

Sagal graduated from Palisades High School. After graduation, she attended the California Institute of the Arts until 1972.

== Musical career ==
Sagal began her career in show business as a singer and songwriter. In 1973, she worked as a backing vocalist for various singers, including Bob Dylan, Etta James, and Tanya Tucker. In 1976, while a member of The Group with No Name, she contributed to the album Moon over Brooklyn (on which she was credited as "Katie Sagal"). She performed backing vocals on the self-titled Gene Simmons solo album (1978), the Molly Hatchet album Take No Prisoners (1981), and on Olivia Newton-John's 1985 single "Soul Kiss."

She was a member of the music group the Harlettes, Bette Midler's backup singers, in 1978, and again from 1982 to 1983.

She performed the song "It's the Time for Love" that appears in the film Silent Rage (1982) featuring Chuck Norris. During the filming of 1983's Valley Girl, Sagal was scheduled to sing at The Central. Her name can be seen in the schedule of upcoming acts, posted inside the door. Sagal also provided the vocals for "Loose Cannons," the theme song for the 1990 film of the same name featuring Gene Hackman and Dan Aykroyd.

On April 19, 1994, Sagal released her first solo album, Well.... On June 1, 2004, she released her second album, Room.

She has also contributed to the Sons of Anarchy soundtrack in the early 2010s, working with its house band The Forest Rangers (Davey Faragher/bass, John Philipe Shenale (Phil Shenale)/keyboards, Billy Harvey/guitar-vocals, Michael Urbano/drums, Bob Thiele Jr./vocals-guitar) with songs that became part of its soundtrack albums (Songs of Anarchy: Music from Sons of Anarchy Seasons 1–4, Sons of Anarchy: Songs of Anarchy Vol. 2, Sons of Anarchy: Songs of Anarchy Vol. 3, and Sons of Anarchy: Songs of Anarchy Vol. 4) and singles.

She worked with the band for her album Covered (2013). For their live performances The Forest Rangers have occasionally used the name The Reluctant Apostles.

The 2019 single "Mayans MC: Black is Black" from Mayans M.C. was performed by Sagal and The Forest Rangers.

== Acting career ==
=== Early roles and success with Married... with Children ===
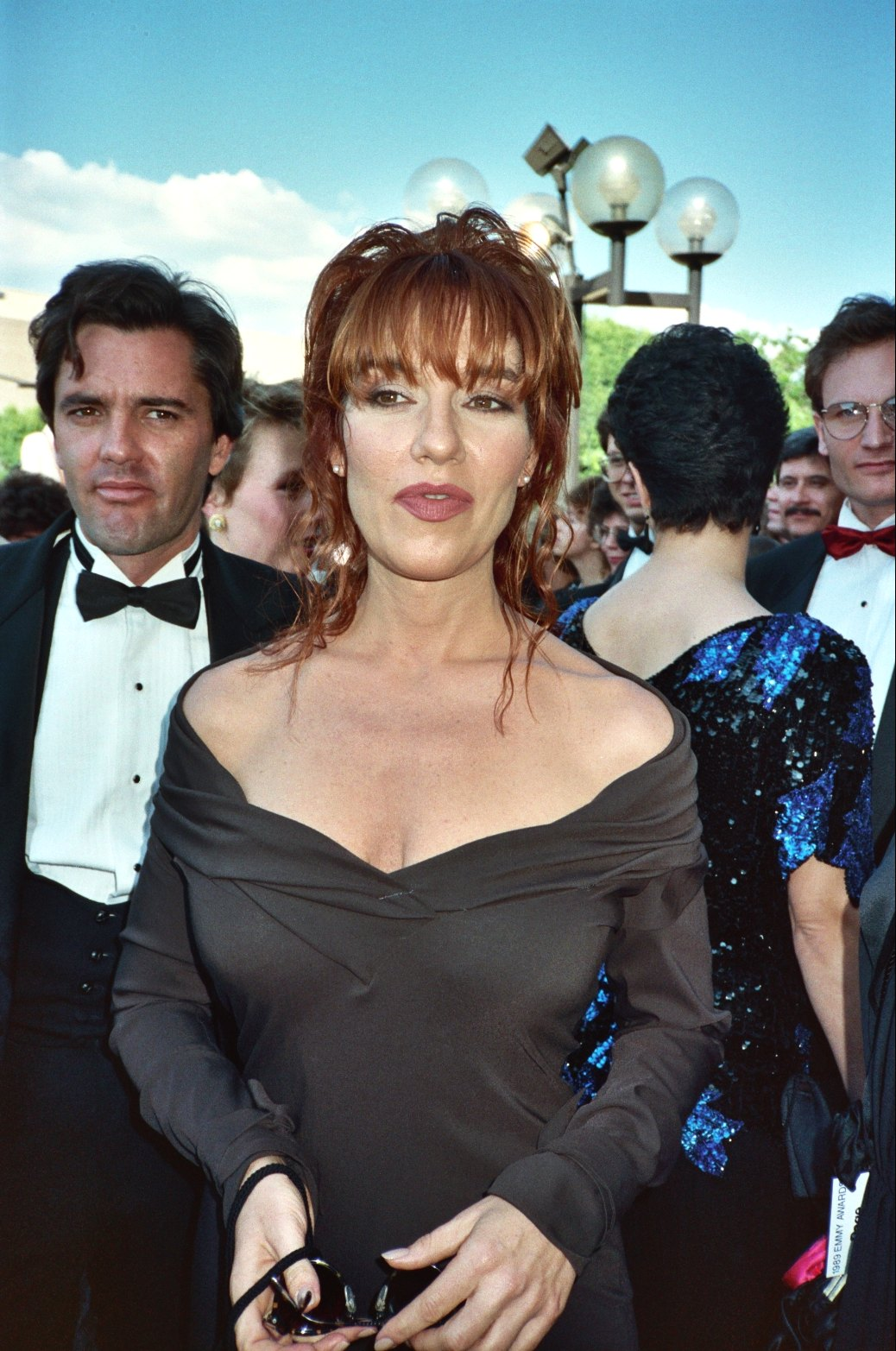
Sagal at the 1989 Emmy Awards

One of Sagal's early roles was as a receptionist in the Columbo installment "Candidate for Crime" (1973), which was directed by her father Boris. She also briefly appeared in the 1986 music video for Debbie Harry's song "French Kissin (in the USA)". Sagal's first major role was as a newspaper columnist in the series Mary (1985–86) starring Mary Tyler Moore. This led to her being cast as Peggy Bundy on the sitcom Married... with Children (1987–1997); she portrayed the lower-class, sex-starved, lazy and free-spending wife of shoe salesman Al Bundy. The series ran for 11 years. Reportedly Sagal brought her own red bouffant wig to audition for the role, and, with the producers' approval, the look transitioned into the show. However, Sagal later explained that she had initially styled her own hair, then, once the show took off, the producers began to invest in a wig.

=== Continued career ===
After the end of Married... with Children, several more television films followed. Sagal also guest-starred on the children's cartoon Recess as the voice of Spinelli's mother. In 1998, Matt Groening chose her to provide the character voice of the purple-haired mutant spaceship captain Leela in his science-fiction animated comedy Futurama. The show developed a cult following but was canceled after four seasons. However, syndication on Adult Swim and Comedy Central increased the show's popularity and led Comedy Central to commission a season of Futurama direct-to-DVD films, which the network later retransmitted as a 16-episode fifth season. She reprised her role as Leela in the films and in the sixth season that began airing June 24, 2010. The series ended its run on Comedy Central in 2013. Taking a break from animation, she went on to star in the critically acclaimed movie Smart House.

Sagal guest-starred as Edna Hyde, Steven Hyde's mother, in three episodes of That '70s Show. She starred in the short-lived NBC sitcom Tucker in 2000.

Sagal was cast as the wife of John Ritter in the sitcom 8 Simple Rules for Dating My Teenage Daughter in 2002. Ritter had completed only three episodes of the second season before his death, and the show was canceled in 2005 after its third season.

In 2005 and 2006, Sagal made four appearances on Lost as Helen Norwood. In 2007, she had a role in the season finale of The Winner as Glen Abbot's former teacher, with whom Glen has his first sexual experience.

=== Sons of Anarchy and Hollywood Walk of Fame star ===
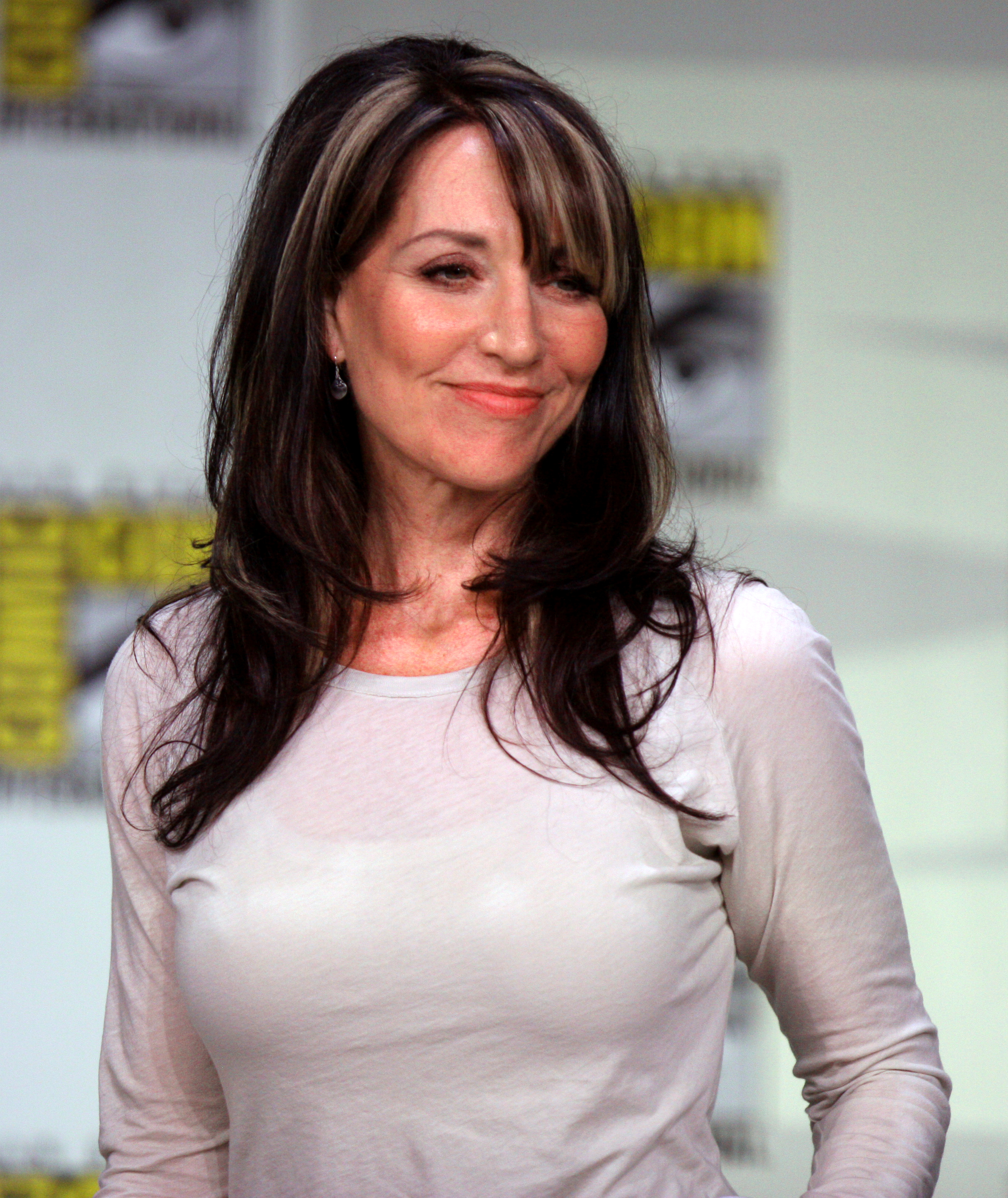
Sagal in 2011

From 2008 to 2014, Sagal starred as Gemma Teller Morrow on the TV show Sons of Anarchy, whose creator, Kurt Sutter, she had married in 2004, four years before the series premiered. In January 2009, Sagal reunited with David Faustino (who had played her son Bud Bundy in Married... with Children) for an episode of Faustino's show Star-ving. In 2010, she appeared twice more on Lost. In 2009, she starred in the film House Broken with Danny DeVito. In 2010, she returned to the stage in Randy Newman's musical Harps & Angels.

In 2013, Sagal had a cameo on Glee as Nancy Abrams, Artie Abrams' mother. She co-starred in Pitch Perfect 2, released in 2015, as the mother of Hailee Steinfeld's character. Next she appeared in the biography drama film Bleed for This, as the mother of Vinny Pazienza.

On September 9, 2014, Sagal received a star on the Hollywood Walk of Fame; the Married... with Children cast – Ed O'Neill, Christina Applegate, and David Faustino – were present to celebrate the actor's recognition.

=== Recent roles ===
On September 20, 2016, Sagal appeared on The Big Bang Theory as Susan, the mother of Penny (Kaley Cuoco). Sagal and Cuoco had played mother and daughter before, on 8 Simple Rules. Sagal was also a series regular on the CBS sitcom Superior Donuts from 2017 to 2018. She also appeared on Shameless as Frank's latest, crazy lover. She appeared in a recurring role as Dan Conner's love interest, Louise Goldufski, in The Conners after Roseanne Barr was fired by ABC over controversial tweets on Twitter about Valerie Jarrett. She had a cameo appearance in the Netflix series Dead to Me in season 2, episodes 9 and 10, as Judy Hale's (Linda Cardellini) estranged, emotionally abusive mother Eleanor Hale who was incarcerated. Sagal's co-star on Married...with Children, Christina Applegate, also stars in Dead to Me. In 2018 she had a cameo appearance in the crime drama series Mayans M.C. as Gemma Teller Morrow reprising her role from the Sons of Anarchy series.

In 2021, Sagal played the lead role of Annie "Rebel" Bello in the ABC drama series Rebel, which was written by Krista Vernoff. Due to low ratings, ABC cancelled Rebel after airing five episodes.

On February 9, 2022, Hulu announced that they would be reviving Futurama for a 20-episode 11th season run set to premiere in 2023 with Sagal returning as the voice of Leela.

In 2023, Sagal appeared live off-broadway in The Gospel According to Heather, which was written by Paul Gordon, directed by Rachel Klein and produced by Amas Musical Theatre and Jim Kierstead.

In 2026 Sagal appeared in Netflix's One Piece live-action adaptation as Dr. Kureha in the second season.

== Personal life ==
Sagal was married to musician Freddie Beckmeier from 1978 to 1981, and to drummer and actor Jack White from 1993 to 2000. She married writer-producer Kurt Sutter in a private ceremony on October 2, 2004, at their home in the Los Angeles neighborhood of Los Feliz. They have a daughter, Esmé Louise, born in 2007 through a surrogate.

In 1991, while working on Married... with Children, Sagal discovered that she was pregnant. This was unexpected and the pregnancy was written into the storyline of the show. In October 1991, however, she had to have an emergency caesarean section in her seventh month of pregnancy, ending in the stillbirth of a daughter. The showrunners did not want to subject a grieving Sagal to further stress by interacting with an infant during filming, so the pregnancy on the show (as well as the pregnancy of co-star Amanda Bearse's character) was then treated as a "dream sequence," which was mentioned only briefly at the end of the episode "Al Bundy, Shoe Dick." Sagal and White eventually had two children—a daughter, Sarah Grace, in 1994, and a son, Jackson James White, in 1996. The writers of Married... with Children purposely did not write Sagal's two later pregnancies into the show due to the stillbirth, opting instead to write off her absences in a subplot in which Peg is traveling the world to reunite her parents. In scenes where Peg was shown, Sagal had her midsection obscured, such as when she was sitting in a taxi or at a craps table in Las Vegas and was often seen or heard talking to family members over the phone.

The loss of her stillborn daughter Ruby was the inspiration to write the lyrics for "(You) Can't Hurry the Harvest". Sagal recorded this song on her debut album, Well..., which was released in April 1994.

In June 2016, the Human Rights Campaign released a video in tribute to the victims of the Pulse nightclub shooting; in the video, Sagal and others told the stories of the people killed there.

She was the subject of an episode of the television genealogy series Who Do You Think You Are? in 2016.

== Filmography ==
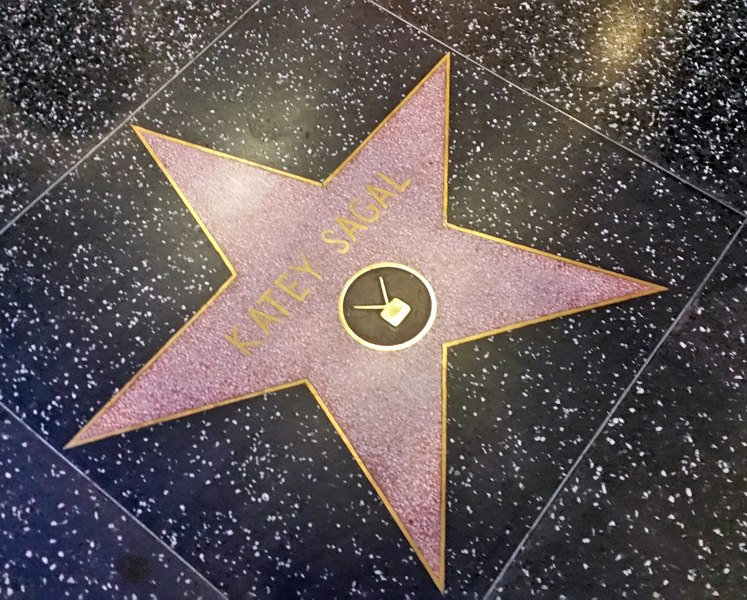
Sagal's star on the Hollywood Walk of Fame

=== Film ===
Year	Title	Role	Notes
1987	Maid to Order	Louise	
1988	The Good Mother	Ursula	
1999	Smart House	PAT	
2000	Dropping Out	Wendy	
2001	Recess: School's Out	Mrs. Flo Spinelli	Voice
2002	Following Tildy	Connie St. John	Short film
2006	I'm Reed Fish	Maureen	
2007	Futurama: Bender's Big Score	Turanga Leela	Voice; Direct to video
2008	Futurama: The Beast with a Billion Backs	Turanga Leela	Voice; Direct to video
2008	Futurama: Bender's Game	Turanga Leela/Leegola	Voice; Direct to video
2009	Futurama: Into the Wild Green Yonder	Turanga Leela	Voice; Direct to video
2009	House Broken	Mary Cathkart	
2009	Jack and the Beanstalk	Mrs. Thatcher	
2014	There's Always Woodstock	Lee Ann	
2015	Pitch Perfect 2	Katherine Junk	
2016	Bleed for This	Louise Pazienza	
2022	Torn Hearts	Harper Dutch	
2025	Trust	Loretta	
2026	Carousel	TBA	

=== Television ===
Year	Title	Role	Notes
1971	The Failing of Raymond	Girl patient	Credited as Catherine Louise Sagal
1972	The Bold Ones: The New Doctors	Young nurse	Credited as Katie Sagal
1973	Columbo	Secretary	Episode: "Candidate for Crime" (credited as Katie Sagal)
1974	Larry	Cashier	TV film
1975	The Dream Makers	Unemployment manager	TV film
1985–1986	Mary	Jo Tucker	13 episodes
1987–1997	Married... with Children	Peggy Bundy	Main role
1990	Mother Goose Rock 'n' Rhyme	Mary Quite Contrary	TV movie
1990	Tales from the Crypt	Ms. Kilbasser	Episode: "For Cryin' Out Loud"
1990	The Earth Day Special	Peggy Bundy	
1991	She Says She's Innocent (Violation of Trust)	Susan Essex	TV movie
1995	Trail of Tears	Annie Cook	TV movie
1995	Nachtshow		Episode: "February 10th, 1995"
1995	Duckman	Ivana Duckman	Voice, episode: "The Germ Turns"
1996	Space Cases	Ma	Voice, episode: "Mother Knows Best"
1997–2001	Recess	Flo Spinelli	Voice, 3 episodes
1998	Chance of a Lifetime	Irene Dunbar	TV movie
1998	Mr. Headmistress	Harriet Magnum	TV movie
1999	No Higher Love	Ellen Young	TV movie
1999	Smart House	Pat	TV movie
1999	That '70s Show	Edna Hyde	3 episodes
1999–present	Futurama	Turanga Leela	Voice, main role
2000	Tucker	Claire Wennick	13 episodes
2001	The Geena Davis Show	Ashley	Episode: "Girls' Night Out"
2002	Imagine That	Barb Thompson	2 episodes
2002–2005	8 Simple Rules for Dating My Teenage Daughter	Cate S. Hennessy	76 episodes
2004	When Angels Come to Town	Jo	TV movie
2004–2006	Higglytown Heroes	Monica the Police Officer	3 episodes
2005	Three Wise Guys	Shirley Crown	TV movie
2005	Campus Confidential	Naomi Jacobs	TV movie
2005	Ghost Whisperer	Francie Lewis	Episode: "Undead Comic"
2005–2007	The Shield	Nancy Gilroy	2 episodes
2005–2010	Lost	Helen Norwood	4 episodes
2006	Boston Legal	Barbara Little	5 episodes
2006	The Search for the Funniest Mom in America	Host	Reality show
2007	The Winner	Lydia Berko	Episode: "Hot for Teacher"
2008	Eli Stone	Marci Klein	2 episodes
2008	CSI: Crime Scene Investigation	Annabelle Bundt/Natasha Steele	Episode: "Two and a Half Deaths"
2008–2014	Sons of Anarchy	Gemma Teller Morrow	92 episodes
2010	Chadam	Sandy	Web series
2013	Glee	Nancy Abrams	Episode: "Wonder-ful"
2014	The Simpsons	Turanga Leela	Voice, episode: "Simpsorama"
2014–2015	Regular Show	Mordecai's Mom, Aunt Maxine	Voice, 2 episodes
2014–2015	A to Z	Narrator	Voice, 13 episodes
2015	The Bastard Executioner	Annora of the Alders	10 episodes
2016	The Big Bang Theory	Susan	Episode: "The Conjugal Conjecture"
2016	This Is Us	Lanie Schultz	Episode: "The Big Three"
2016–2017	Brooklyn Nine-Nine	Karen Peralta	2 episodes
2017	Dirty Dancing	Vivian Pressman	TV movie
2017–2018	Superior Donuts	Randy DeLuca	Main role
2018	Spirit Riding Free	Butch LePray	Voice
2018	Mayans M.C.	Gemma Teller-Morrow	Uncredited cameo Episode: "Perro/Oc"
2018–2019	Shameless	Dr. Ingrid Jones	7 episodes
2018–2025	The Conners	Louise Goldufski-Conner	Recurring role
2019	Grand Hotel	Teresa Williams	3 episodes
2020–2022	Dead to Me	Eleanor Hale	3 episodes
2021	Rebel	Annie "Rebel" Bello	Main role
2022	Tell Me Lies	Nora (Stephen's mom)	2 episodes
2024	Rhett & Link's Wonderhole	Experiment Narrator	1 episode "We Spent 24 Hours in Red and Blue Rooms"
2025	The Abandons	Giselle	guest appearance in Episode 2
2026	One Piece	Dr. Kureha	Season 2

=== Video games ===
Year	Title	Role	Notes
2003	Futurama	Turanga Leela	

== Discography ==
=== Albums ===
Year	Title	Chart positions
1976	The Group with No Name - Moon Over Brooklyn: Released: 1976; Label: Casablanca Records	—
1978	Gene Simmons - Gene Simmons: Backing Vocals; Released: September 18, 1978; Label: Casablanca Records	Billboard 200 Albums – 22
1994	Well...: Released: April 19, 1994; Label: Virgin/EMI Records	Billboard Top Heatseekers – 33
2004	Room: June 1, 2004; Label: Valley Entertainment	—
2009	Sons of Anarchy: Shelter – EP: November 24, 2009; Label: 20th Century Fox	Top Independent Albums — 33 Top Soundtracks — 23
2013	Covered: November 11, 2013; Label: E1 Music	—

== Awards and nominations ==
Year	Award	Category	Film or series	Result
1989	American Comedy Awards	Funniest Female Performer in a TV Series	Married... with Children	Nominated
1991	Golden Globe Award	Best Actress – Television Series Musical or Comedy	Married... with Children	Nominated
1992	Golden Globe Award	Best Actress – Television Series Musical or Comedy	Married... with Children	Nominated
1993	Golden Globe Award	Best Actress – Television Series Musical or Comedy	Married... with Children	Nominated
1993	American Comedy Awards	Funniest Female Performer in a TV Series	Married... with Children	Nominated
1994	Golden Globe Award	Best Actress – Television Series Musical or Comedy	Married... with Children	Nominated
2005	Prism Awards	Performance in a Comedy Series	8 Simple Rules for Dating My Teenage Daughter	Won
2009	TV Land Awards	Innovation Award (Shared with: Christina Applegate, David Faustino, Ted McGinley, Ed O'Neill)	Married... with Children	Won
2010	Television Critics Association Awards	Individual Achievement in Drama	Sons of Anarchy	Nominated
2010	Satellite Awards	Best Actress – Television Series Drama	Sons of Anarchy	Nominated
2011	Golden Globe Award	Best Actress – Television Series Drama	Sons of Anarchy	Won
2011	Prism Awards	Best Actress – Television Series Drama	Sons of Anarchy	Nominated
2011	Satellite Awards	Best Actress – Television Series Drama	Sons of Anarchy	Nominated
2011	Critics' Choice Television Award	Best Actress in a Drama Series	Sons of Anarchy	Nominated
2012	Critics' Choice Television Award	Best Actress in a Drama Series	Sons of Anarchy	Nominated
2013	Prism Awards	Female Performance in a Drama Series Multi-Episode Storyline	Sons of Anarchy	Won
2014	Hollywood Walk of Fame	Star on the Walk of Fame		—N/a
