= The Group with No Name =

The Group With No Name
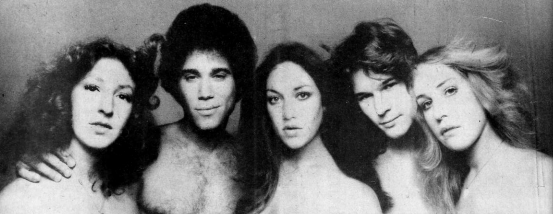

The Group With No Name was an American 1970s rock group, that was signed to Neil Bogart's Casablanca Records. The group included the future actress Katey Sagal. They released one album, Moon Over Brooklyn, and a couple of singles including "Baby Love (How Could You Leave Me)" (Casablanca 860, 1976), with no commercial success.

Jimmy Lott and Alan Miles wrote all the music on the album, along with Katey Sagal who cowrote "Never You Mind" and "It's Me and You". In 2007, Lott released an album called "Not Enough Love". He resides with his wife and daughter in Portland, Oregon.

Bob Babbitt was a famous and successful bass player. He recorded with Funk Brothers.

Allan Schwartzberg was known as the best disco drummer in New York City. He was not part of the original group and only played drums in a recording session for their album.

The album's title song, "Moon Over Brooklyn", achieved critical acclaim and was re-recorded by Canadian superstar Anne Murray.

== Discography ==

=== Albums ===
- Moon Over Brooklyn

=== Singles ===
- "Baby Love (How Could You Leave Me)" b/w "All I Need"
- "Roll On Brother" b/w "Never You Mind"

== Members ==
- Bass - Bob Babbitt, Don Payne
- Congas - Carlos Martin, Jimmy Maelen
- Drums - Allan Schwartzberg
- Vocals - Jimmy Lott, Katey Sagal, Carolyn Ray, Franny Eisenberg
- Piano - Alan Miles
