= Three for the Show =

1955 film by H. C. Potter

- Poster
- Directed by: H. C. Potter
- Written by: Edward Hope; Leonard B. Stern
- Based on: Home and Beauty by W. Somerset Maugham
- Produced by: Jonie Taps
- Starring: Betty Grable; Jack Lemmon; Gower Champion; Marge Champion
- Cinematography: Arthur E. Arling
- Edited by: Viola Lawrence
- Music by: George Duning
- Distributed by: Columbia Pictures
- Release date: February 24, 1955 (New York City)
- Running time: 93 minutes 89 minutes (Sony print)
- Country: United States
- Language: English
- Box office: $1.25 million (US)

Three for the Show is a 1955 Technicolor and in CinemaScope musical comedy remake of Too Many Husbands. It stars actress Betty Grable, in her last musical, opposite Jack Lemmon, Gower Champion and Marge Champion. It is based on the 1919 play Home and Beauty by W. Somerset Maugham, which was retitled to Too Many Husbands when it came to New York.

== Plot ==
Singing-and-dancing stage star Julie (Betty Grable) is told that husband Marty (Jack Lemmon) is reported missing in action during the Korean War. After a long waiting period, she makes plans to marry Vernon (Gower Champion), who is Marty's best friend. After the marriage, Marty (who crashed but survived on an island) turns up at one of Julie's shows. Upon discovering Julie's new marriage, Marty demands his rights as her first husband.

Julie finds that she is legally married to both Marty and Vernon. She soon realises that she must choose who she wants to be with, if only to avoid being branded a bigamist. But Julie loves the idea of having two husbands and so she decides to try to live with them both, to the annoyance and disapproval of Marty and Vernon who both know that her idea will not work out.

Meanwhile, Julie's close friend Gwen (Marge Champion) has a secret crush on Marty and hopes to be with him, if only Julie could make her up mind as to who she wants. After a long serious decision and a talk with them both, Julie decides that she is more in love with Marty and she leaves Vernon, who has now fallen for Gwen.

== Cast ==
- Betty Grable as Julie Lowndes
- Jack Lemmon as Martin 'Marty' Stewart
- Gower Champion as Vernon Lowndes
- Marge Champion as Gwen Howard
- Myron McCormick as Mike Hudson
- Paul Harvey as Col. Harold J. Wharton
- Robert Bice as Sgt. Charlie O'Hallihan
- Charlotte Lawrence as Miss Williams

== Reception ==
The New York Times called the film a "slight but cheerful item" and said "Three for the Show does serve to bring Betty Grable back to the screen. Luminously blonde and shapely enough to give the megrims to most of the readers of fan magazines, Miss Grable proves she can fill a musical assignment as neatly as she does her pleasantly revealing wardrobe."

== Songs ==
- How Come You Do Me Like You Do?

Words and Music by Gene Austin and Ray Bergere
Performed by Betty Grable

- Down Boy

Words and Music by Hoagy Carmichael and Harold Adamson
Performed by Betty Grable, Gower Champion, and Jack Lemmon
The song had been written by Carmichael for Marilyn Monroe in Gentlemen Prefer Blondes; a film that had originally been offered to Betty Grable, however Darryl F. Zanuck ordered the song removed from the film.

- I've Got a Crush on You

Words and Music by George Gershwin and Ira Gershwin
Performed by Betty Grable and Jack Lemmon
Also performed in the finale by Betty Grable, Jack Lemmon, Marge Champion and Gower Champion

- Someone to Watch Over Me

Words and Music by George Gershwin and Ira Gershwin
Performed by Marge Champion and Gower Champion during the opening titles and danced to by the couple later in the picture.
Later sung by Marge Champion

- Swan Lake

Danced to by Marge Champion and Gower Champion in French royal court costuming during a dream sequence

- Just One of Those Things

Music and Lyrics by Cole Porter (uncredited)
Performed by Betty Grable, Marge Champion and Gower Champion

- Which One

Words and Music by Lester Lee and Ned Washington
Performed by Marge Champion

- Polovetsian Dances

Music by Aleksandr Borodin (uncredited)
Used as introductory music for "Which One"

- I've Been Kissed Before

Words and Music by Bob Russell and Lester Lee
Performed by Betty Grable.

- Finale from "William Tell Overture"

From the opera William Tell by Gioacchino Rossini.
Danced to by Gower Champion in the Two Husbands fantasy

== See also ==
- List of American films of 1955
- My Favorite Wife, a 1940 film, in which it is the wife (played by Irene Dunne) who returns, just as her husband (Cary Grant) embarks on his honeymoon
- Move Over, Darling, the 1963 remake of My Favorite Wife, starring Doris Day, James Garner, and Polly Bergen
