= Joey Sagal =

American actor and screenwriter (born 1957)

- Born: Joseph B. Sagal; February 12, 1957 (age 69); Los Angeles, California, U.S.
- Occupations: Actor, screenwriter
- Years active: 1979–present
- Parents: Boris Sagal; Sara Zwilling
- Relatives: Katey Sagal (sister); Liz Sagal (sister); Jean Sagal (sister); Jackson White (nephew); Marge Champion (stepmother)

Joseph B. Sagal (born February 12, 1957) is an American actor and screenwriter. He is the son of film director Boris Sagal and brother of actor and singer Katey Sagal.

== Career ==
He originated the part of "The Visitor" on the Geffen Playhouse stage in the World Premiere Steppenwolf Production of the initial 357 performances of Steve Martin's Picasso at the Lapin Agile. This production was the Los Angeles debut of Chicago's Steppenwolf Theatre Company. He played the supervillain, Gunn, in the DC movie The Return of Swamp Thing. He then wrote the screenplay for, acted in and worked as an executive producer for the film Elvis & Nixon. The first film has recently been officially acquired by Amazon.com. Sagal even met Elvis Presley on the set of his father's 1965 film Girl Happy, which eventually inspired him to personally take the role of Elvis first as "The Visitor" in Steve Martin's play “Picasso at the Lapin Agile,” and then write and sell the screenplay for Elvis & Nixon. He later played Elvis again for legendary writer Stephen King in his televised mini-series, “Nightmares and Dreamscapes”, particularly in King's Rock n Roll story, “You Know They Got a Hell of a Band”, as the Mayor of Rock 'n' Roll in Heaven. The miniseries was shot in Australia. He also appeared in “Not Another Celebrity Movie,” meant to be a spoof of the Ocean's Eleven film, playing a comedic version of George Clooney. He later played an announcer directly made to impersonate Elvis in the movie Redline, which was meant to pay homage to the Fast and the Furious franchise. Sagal returned to his Elvis role by playing him again as a vampire hunter on the SyFy channel in the series The Chronicle in the episode “ The King is Undead”. Additionally, he did two more movies for New Line Cinema: “Quiet Cool” playing the stoner Toker, and “The Hidden” playing the Drunk.

== Family ==
Sagal's father, Boris Sagal, was a Ukrainian-Jewish immigrant who worked as a television director.

== Filmography ==
Year	Title	Role	Notes
1985	Final Jeopardy	Mike	TV movie
1986	Quiet Cool	Toker	
1987	The Hidden	Drunk	
1989	The Return of Swamp Thing	Gunn	
1992	Out for Blood	Bubbah	
1993	Beyond the Law	Talco Artist	
1993	Marilyn & Bobby: Her Final Affair	Clive Hoskin	TV movie
1994	The Chase	Sgt. Hodges	
1996	Barb Wire	Fred the Bartender	
1998	Whatever It Takes	Pope Kim	
2003	Lost Treasure	Chuck "Chucky" Daniels	
2004	Retrograde	Andrew Schrader	
2005	Into the Sun	Tech #1	
2006	Unbeatable Harold	Elvis Presley	
2007	Cult	Logan - Mindy's Dad	
2007	Redline	Elvis Announcer	
2007	Anna Nicole	L.A. Doctor	
2013	Not Another Celebrity Movie	George Clooney	
2015	Flora Tango	George Rooney	Short
2016	Elvis & Nixon	Elvis Impersonator	
