= Charlotte Lawrence (actress) =

American actress

- Born: Charlotte Sorkin; April 22, 1921; Los Angeles, California, U.S.
- Died: October 20, 1993 (aged 72); Van Nuys, California, U.S.
- Occupation: Actress
- Years active: 1940–1993

Charlotte Lawrence (April 22, 1921 – October 20, 1993) was an American actress. She appeared in numerous films and TV series from the 1940s to the 1960s.

== Early life ==
Lawrence was born Charlotte Sorkin in Los Angeles, California in 1921. She attended Fairfax High School where she acted in theatre in Los Angeles before moving to New York to begin her show business career.

== Career ==
Lawrence started her career during the 1940s, appearing in films such as Half a Hero, Phffft, Three for the Show, Trial, The Solid Gold Cadillac, and The Opposite Sex among others during the 1950s and 1960s.

On television, Lawrence played a variety of roles on Life with Elizabeth. She also appeared on Dragnet, Climax!, I Led 3 Lives, I Married Joan, Cavalcade of America, Four Star Playhouse, Schlitz Playhouse of Stars, Highway Patrol and Chevron Hall of Stars among others.

On old-time radio, Lawrence portrayed Stacy McGill on The Adventures of Christopher Wells and Reba Britton on Just Plain Bill. She was also a member of the cast of This Is Nora Drake. From the 1940s throughout the 1960s she appeared in several radio shows like Lux Radio Theatre, Suspense and Gunsmoke.

During the 1960s she worked at Capitol Records and Lorimar Television Productions, where she had a corporate position.

== Death ==
Lawrence died on October 20, 1993, at the age of 72 in Van Nuys, California.

== Filmography ==
=== Film ===
- Half a Hero (1953) - Alice Faring (uncredited)
- Phffft (1954) - Cynthia (uncredited)
- Three for the Show (1955) - Miss Williams (uncredited)
- Trial (1955) - Mrs. Eunice Webson (uncredited)
- The Solid Gold Cadillac (1956) - Girl (uncredited)
- The Opposite Sex (1956) - Manicurist (uncredited)

=== Television ===
- Gang Busters - "The Quirley Gang" (1952) TV Episode .... Edith Newton
- Life with Elizabeth -
- Dragnet - "The Big Blast" (1952) TV Episode - The Big Trial (1952) TV Episode - The Big Betty (1953) TV Episode .... Helga
- Climax! - "Sorry, Wrong Number" (1954) TV Episode
- I Led 3 Lives - "Purloined Printing Press" (1953) TV Episode .... Miss Berdoni - "Gun Running" (1953) TV Episode .... Carol - Philbrick's Secretary - "Dope Photographic" (1953) TV Episode .... Miss Berdoni - "The Boss" (1954) TV Episode .... Carol - Philbrick's Secretary - "Narcotics" (1954) TV Episode .... Carol - Philbrick's Secretary - "Birthday" (1954) TV Episode .... Carol - Philbrick's Secretary - "Investments" (1954) TV Episode .... Carol - Philbrick's Secretary
- I Married Joan - "Home Movies" (1954) TV Episode - "How to Win Friends" (1955) TV Episode .... Violet
- Stage 7 - "Emergency" (1955) TV Episode .... Operator - "Billy and the Bride" (1955) TV Episode .... Mother
- I Love Lucy - "No Children Allowed" (1953) TV Episode .... Clubwoman - "The Homecoming" (1955) TV Episode .... Marge
- Cavalcade of America - "One Day at a Time" (1955) TV Episode
- Four Star Playhouse - "Looking Glass House" (1955) TV Episode .... Miss Downs
- Schlitz Playhouse of Stars - "Moment of Triumph" (1955) TV Episode .... Nurse
- Highway Patrol - "Reformed Criminal" (1955) TV Episode .... Police Dispatcher - "Human Bomb" (1955) TV Episode .... Police Dispatcher
- Chevron Hall of Stars - "Crisis in Kansas" (1956) TV Episode
- Science Fiction Theatre - "Sound of Murder" (1956) TV Episode .... Telephone Operator
- The DuPont Show with June Allyson - "Surprise Party" (1960) TV Episode .... Manicurist
- This Man Dawson - "The Bomber" (1960) TV Episode .... Janet Mason
- The Lucy Show - "Lucy Is a Chaperone" (1963) TV Episode .... Mrs. Wescott
- Burke's Law - "Who Killed the Eleventh Best Dressed Woman in the World?" (1964) TV Episode .... Attendant
