= Well... =

Studio album by Katey Sagal
- Released: April 19, 1994
- Genre: Adult contemporary
- Length: 57:13
- Label: Virgin
- Producers: David Frank, Rupert Hine, Robbie Nevil, Bob Thiele Jr.

Katey Sagal chronology
Well... (1994)	Room (2004)

Professional ratings
Review scores
Source	Rating
AllMusic	2.5/5 stars
Pittsburgh Post-Gazette	1.5/4 stars

Well... is the first album by the American singer-songwriter and actress Katey Sagal. It was released in 1994 via Virgin Records.

The album peaked at No. 33 on Billboard's Heatseekers Albums chart.

== Critical reception ==
The Advocate thought that "in an attempt to endow the schmaltzy lyrics with as much sincerity as possible, Sagal emotes almost to the point of parody."

AllMusic wrote that "the problem with Well...'s lack of commercial success probably had to do with the fact that it was too smooth for blues fans and too bluesy for adult contemporary; of course, those are also its strengths."

== Track listing ==
No.	Title	Writer(s)	Length
1.	"Thunderhead (I Just Wanted a Little Rain)"	Julie Christensen	3:40
2.	"Can't Hurry the Harvest"	Katey Sagal, Phil Roy, Bob Thiele Jr.	5:20
3.	"Some Things Are Better Left Unsaid"	Sagal; Robbie Nevil; David Frank	4:20
4.	"That's How Love Goes"	Sagal; Thiele Jr.; John Shanks	4:55
5.	"September Rain"	Sagal; Roy; Thiele Jr.	6:15
6.	"Peace"	Sagal; Roy; Thiele Jr.	6:04
7.	"All Is Well"	Brent Bourgeois; Bongo Bob Smith	4:31
8.	"Act of Faith"	Sagal; Shanks; Bourgeois	4:49
9.	"I Don't Wanna Know"	Sagal; Roy; Thiele Jr.	5:01
10.	"Don't Know How to Let You Go"	Sagal; Shanks; Thiele Jr.	4:38
11.	"Best Part"	Kathy Fisher; Ron Wasserman	3:52
12.	"Dignity"	Sagal; Paul Gordon	3:48
Total length:			57:13

== Personnel ==
- Katey Sagal - vocals, piano
- David Frank, John Philip Shenale - keyboards
- Tom Keene - piano
- Mark Goldenberg, Robbie Nevil, Phil Palmer, John Shanks - guitars
- Amy Kanter, Joe Williams - gut-string guitars, backing vocals
- Brent Bourgeois - gut-string guitars, keyboards, backing vocals
- Bob Thiele Jr. - guitars, keyboards, programming, piano, backing vocals
- Jim Hanson, Tom Lilly, Guy Pratt, Freddie "Ready Freddie" Washington - bass
- Rupert Hine - electric and synthesized bass, organ, piano, keyboards, programming, backing vocals
- Brian MacLeod, Jack White - drums
- Paulinho da Costa, Debra Dobkin - percussion
- Martin Tillman - cello
- Rosemary Butler, Rita Coolidge, Laura Creamer, Julie Delgado, Beth Hooker, Kipp, Mark & Pat Lennon, Roger Manning, Sandy Simmons, Andy Sturmer, Billy Valentine - backing vocals
