= Move Over, Darling =

1963 film by Michael Gordon

- Theatrical release poster
- Directed by: Michael Gordon
- Screenplay by: Hal Kanter; Jack Sher
- Story by: Bella Spewack Samuel Spewack; Leo McCarey
- Based on: My Favorite Wife by: Bella Spewack; Samuel Spewack
- Produced by: Aaron Rosenberg; Martin Melcher
- Starring: Doris Day; James Garner; Polly Bergen; Thelma Ritter; Fred Clark; Don Knotts; Elliott Reid; Chuck Connors
- Cinematography: Daniel L. Fapp
- Edited by: Robert Simpson
- Music by: Lionel Newman
- Production companies: Melcher-Arcola Productions; Avernus Productions
- Distributed by: 20th Century Fox
- Release date: December 25, 1963
- Running time: 103 minutes
- Country: United States
- Language: English
- Budget: $3.35 million
- Box office: $12.7 million

Move Over, Darling is a 1963 American romantic comedy film directed by Michael Gordon and starring Doris Day, James Garner, and Polly Bergen. It was filmed in DeLuxe Color and CinemaScope, and released by 20th Century Fox. The supporting cast features Thelma Ritter, Fred Clark, Don Knotts, Elliott Reid, and Chuck Connors.

The film is a remake of the 1940 screwball comedy film My Favorite Wife, starring Irene Dunne, Cary Grant, and Gail Patrick. In between these films, an unfinished version, titled Something's Got to Give, began shooting in 1962, directed by George Cukor and starring Marilyn Monroe, Dean Martin, and Cyd Charisse.

Move Over, Darling was chosen as the 1964 Royal Film Performance, and had its UK premiere at the Odeon Leicester Square on February 24, 1964, in the presence of Prince Philip, Duke of Edinburgh.

At the 21st Golden Globe Awards, Day was nominated for Best Actress in a Motion Picture – Musical or Comedy but lost to Shirley MacLaine in Irma la Douce.

== Plot ==
Lawyer Nick Arden is in court to get two petitions approved: he wants his first wife Ellen Wagstaff Arden declared legally dead after she went missing five years before when the plane they were traveling on crashed into the Pacific Ocean and he wants to marry psychoanalyst Bianca Steele. After some confusion, Judge Bryson declares Ellen legally dead and marries Nick and Bianca, who then immediately leave for Monterey for their honeymoon.

On the same day, Ellen returns to shore on a U.S. Navy submarine, which had rescued her from a deserted island where she had spent the last five years. When she returns to her and Nick's home in Los Angeles, she encounters her young daughters, who do not remember her, but she cannot bring herself to tell them the truth. Shocked at Ellen's return, her mother-in-law Grace Arden tells her of the new marriage and that the honeymoon will be at the same hotel where Nick and Ellen spent theirs. At Grace's urging, Ellen flies to Monterey to prevent the consummation of the marriage.

Ellen arrives at the hotel and reveals her presence to Nick, who is overjoyed to reunite with her. Ellen requests that he tell Bianca the truth first. When Nick returns to a confused and angry Bianca, Ellen eavesdrops on their conversation. Nick fails to tell Bianca the truth and Ellen leaves the hotel angrily. When Nick sees Ellen depart, he fakes an injury to prevent further advances by Bianca.

The next day, when Nick returns home with Bianca, he finds Ellen posing as a Swedish masseuse employed by Grace to help him with his back. As Ellen and Bianca tussle, an insurance adjuster arrives with papers for a Mrs. Arden to sign regarding a Stephen Burkett. Nick is informed that Ellen was on the deserted island with a man called Stephen Burkett for the whole five years and they were rescued together. They jokingly called each other "Adam" and "Eve". Nick is furious that Ellen did not tell him about Burkett and confronts her. She tells him that Burkett is a nerd and that nothing happened between them.

Later, on Grace's advice, Ellen convinces an awkward-looking shoe clerk to pose as Burkett. Nick is not convinced and looks for Burkett himself. When he finds him at the swimming pool of the Beverly Hills Hotel, he notices to his horror that Burkett is young, attractive, and athletic. Nick takes Ellen to the same pool bar, intending to confront her with Burkett. She confesses the truth about Burkett but insists that nothing happened between the two in the five years and asks for Nick's forgiveness. However, when she spots Burkett, she angrily accuses Nick of trying to humiliate her and storms off.

Shortly after Nick tells Bianca the truth about Ellen, he is arrested for bigamy, learning that Grace reported him earlier to force him to choose between Ellen and Bianca. This leads to another chaotic court hearing before Judge Bryson, who is even more confused when he is entrusted with several matters: Nick's charge of bigamy, Bianca's request to annul their marriage, Ellen's request to void her death certificate, and Ellen's request for a divorce from Nick. Bryson dismisses the bigamy charge, annuls Nick and Bianca's marriage, declares Ellen alive again and postpones judgement on the divorce proceedings between Ellen and Nick. When Burkett arrives and expresses his desire to marry Ellen, Nick leaves in a jealous rage. Ellen then rebuffs Burkett's advances and leaves.

When Ellen returns home several hours later, devastated, she learns that Nick has already told his daughters that she is their mother, and they all happily reunite.

== Cast ==
- Doris Day as Ellen Wagstaff Arden
- James Garner as Nick Arden
- Polly Bergen as Bianca Steele Arden
- Thelma Ritter as Grace Arden
- Fred Clark as Mr. Codd
- Don Knotts as shoe clerk
- Elliott Reid as Dr. Herman Schlick
- Edgar Buchanan as Judge Bryson
- John Astin as Clyde Prokey
- Pat Harrington Jr. as district attorney
- Eddie Quillan as bellboy
- Max Showalter as hotel desk clerk
- Alvy Moore as room service waiter
- Pami Lee as Jenny Arden
- Leslie Farrell as Didi Arden
- Chuck Connors as Stephen Burkett ("Adam")
- Alan Sues as court clerk (uncredited)
- Jack Orrison as bartender (uncredited)

== Production ==
The film's script was written by Hal Kanter and Jack Sher, reworking an earlier script written by Arnold Schulman, Nunnally Johnson, and Walter Bernstein that was an update of 1940's My Favorite Wife by Leo McCarey and Samuel and Bella Spewack. The script includes a reference to My Favorite Wife during the scene in which Ellen gives Bianca a massage.

The story is a comedic update of the 1864 poem "Enoch Arden" by Alfred, Lord Tennyson, and the poem's title is the source of the lead characters' surname. This was the seventh film based on "Enoch Arden".

The film was originally to be a vehicle for Marilyn Monroe under the working title of Something's Got to Give, with George Cukor as director. Dean Martin was cast as Nick Arden after initial choice James Garner was committed to doing The Great Escape. Monroe was fired early in the original production cycle following repeated absences on filming days, ultimately appearing in only about 30 minutes of usable film. At first, it was announced that Lee Remick would step into Monroe's place; though some press pictures were released and some scenes were shot with Remick, Martin balked at working with anyone but Monroe. Monroe was rehired but died before she could resume filming, leaving the original version incomplete. Unable to complete the film, and having already sunk a considerable amount of money into the production and sets, 20th Century Fox went ahead with the project, albeit with a new title, new director Michael Gordon, and a new cast (with the exception of Thelma Ritter, who was also cast as Grace Arden in the Cukor version). Garner, now available following the completion of his work in The Great Escape, was cast as Nick Arden.

Garner accidentally broke Day's rib during the massage scene in which he pulls Day off of Bergen. He was not aware of what had happened until the next day, when he felt the bandage while putting his arms around Day.

The film utilized most of the interiors and stage-built exteriors from the original Cukor production for the Arden home, which was based on Cukor's Beverly Hills home. The on-location exterior scenes at the Arden home were filmed about three miles west, at 377 South Mapleton Drive in Holmby Hills. The original neoclassical house seen in the film has since been replaced by an enormous Italianate structure.

The producers scheduled the scene with Day riding through a car wash for the last day of shooting because they feared that the chemicals in the detergents might affect her complexion. When the scene went off without a hitch, they admitted their ploy to Day, then used the story in promotional materials for the film.

== Soundtrack ==
- "Move Over Darling" – The film's title theme, with music and lyrics by Joe Lubin, Hal Kanter and Terry Melcher (Day's son), arranged by Jack Nitzsche, is sung by Day and chorus (featuring ace West Coast session singers the Blossoms, featuring Darlene Love, Fanita James and Jean King) during the opening credits and played as background music at the end. The song reached number eight on the UK singles chart in 1964 for Day and charted in 1983 for Tracey Ullman.
- "Bridal Chorus (Here Comes the Bride)" from Lohengrin (1850) – Written by Richard Wagner, the song is played when Nick and Bianca arrive at their honeymoon hotel.
- "Beautiful Dreamer" – With music and lyrics by Stephen Foster, it is heard as background music during the memorial service for Ellen.
- "Twinkle Lullaby" – Ellen sings this song, with music and lyrics by Joe Lubin, to her children.

== Reception ==
=== Box office ===
Move Over, Darling grossed $12,705,882 in the United States, becoming one of the highest-grossing of 1963 and helping keep 20th Century Fox afloat after the losses it had incurred in the making of Cleopatra. Move Over, Darling earned $6 million in U.S. theatrical rentals.

According to Fox records, the film was profitable, as it earned $8,750,000, exceeding the $8,300,000 needed in order to break even.

=== Critical response ===
The film has received generally mixed reviews from critics. In 1963, a review in Variety stated: "Doris Day and James Garner play it to the hilt, comically, dramatically and last, but not least (particularly in the case of the former), athletically. What is missing in their portrayals is a light touch, the ability to humorously convey with a subtle eyelash-bat or eyebrow-arch what it tends to take them a kick in the shins to accomplish."

However, more recent reviews have been more positive. David Nusair of Reel Film Reviews praised James Garner's performance and Sue Heal of Radio Times gave the film four out of five stars, stating: "Slick, utterly professional and without a wasted scene, this is a sheer delight from start to finish."

== Novelization ==
Slightly in advance of the film's release, as was the custom of the era, a paperback novelization of the film was published by Dell Books. The author was renowned crime and western novelist Marvin H. Albert, who also made something of a cottage industry out of movie tie-ins. He seems to have been the most prolific screenplay novelizer of the late 1950s through the mid-1960s, and, during that time, the preeminent specialist at light comedy.

The book can be classified as an "inferred novelization" as none of the screenwriters is given attribution, but the copyright is assigned to Twentieth Century Fox. The cover displays a painting of Garner carrying Day in his arms against an all-white background, a typical Dell cover to a romantic comedy tie-in. The book also contains a four-page insert of black-and-white movie stills. The cover price is 40¢.

== See also ==
- List of American films of 1963
