= Boris Sagal =

American director and producer (1923–1981)

- Born: October 18, 1923; Yekaterinoslav, Ukrainian SSR, Soviet Union
- Died: May 22, 1981 (aged 57); Portland, Oregon, U.S.
- Cause of death: Helicopter accident
- Occupation: Director
- Years active: 1955–1981
- Spouses: Sara Zwilling (m. 1952; died 1975) Marge Champion (m. 1977)
- Children: 5, including Katey, Jean and Liz, and Joey
- Relatives: Jackson White (grandson)

Boris Sagal (October 18, 1923 – May 22, 1981) was an American television and film director.

== Early life and career ==
Born in Yekaterinoslav, Ukrainian SSR (modern Dnipro, Ukraine) to a Jewish family, Sagal immigrated to the United States. Sagal's TV credits include directing episodes of The Twilight Zone, T.H.E. Cat, Combat!, Alfred Hitchcock Presents, Night Gallery, Columbo: Candidate for Crime, Peter Gunn, and The Man from U.N.C.L.E.. He also directed the 1972 television adaptation of Percy MacKaye's play The Scarecrow, for PBS. He was nominated for four Primetime Emmy Awards for his direction of the miniseries Rich Man, Poor Man and, posthumously, Masada.

Among Sagal's credits for the big screen are the 1965 Elvis Presley film Girl Happy, the 1971 science fiction film The Omega Man, starring Charlton Heston in the lead role, and The Dream Makers.

There is a directing fellowship in his name at the Williamstown Theatre Festival in Massachusetts.

Shortly before his death, Sagal's miniseries Masada aired on ABC.

== Personal life ==
Sagal was the father of Katey, Joey, David, Jean and Liz with his first wife, Sara Zwilling, who died in 1975. His second wife was Marge Champion, to whom he was married from January 1, 1977, until his death.

== Death ==
Sagal was killed in an accident during production of the miniseries World War III, when he was partially decapitated by walking into the tail rotor blades of a helicopter in the parking lot of Timberline Lodge in Oregon. An investigation revealed that he turned the wrong way after exiting the helicopter. He died five hours later at Emanuel Hospital.

He is buried at Forest Lawn Memorial Park.

== See also ==
- List of film and television accidents
- List of unusual deaths in the 20th century
