= Jean Sagal =

American television actress and director

- Occupations: Actress, associate director, director
- Years active: 1982–present
- Father: Boris Sagal
- Relatives: Liz Sagal (twin-sister); Katey Sagal (sister); Joey Sagal (brother); Marge Champion (stepmother)

Jean Sagal is an American television actress and director. In the 1980s, she co-starred with her twin sister Liz Sagal in the television series Double Trouble that ran in 1984–85. She has since appeared on such shows as Picket Fences, Knots Landing, Quantum Leap and 21 Jump Street. She has directed episodes of Two and a Half Men, Mad TV, So Little Time and Just Shoot Me. Sagal and her twin sister also served for a time as the "Doublemint Twins" in the ad campaign by Doublemint gum.

== Early life ==
Sagal is part of a family of entertainment industry professionals. She is the daughter of television director Boris Sagal and the stepdaughter of Marge Champion. Her siblings, older sister Katey Sagal, brother Joey Sagal and twin sister Liz Sagal, are all active in the industry.

== As a director ==
She was the associate director for 2 Broke Girls (42 episodes), and Two and a Half Men (166 episodes). She has also directed episodes for five television shows: Wizards of Waverly Place (1 episode), Two and a Half Men (3 episodes), MADtv (3 episodes), So Little Time (9 episodes), and Just Shoot Me! (4 episodes).

== Partial filmography ==
Television and film roles
Year	Title	Role	Notes
1982	Grease 2	Cheerleader Twin	Film; with twin sister Liz Sagal
1984–1985	Double Trouble	Kate Foster	Lead role; with twin sister Liz Sagal
1985	Simon & Simon	Andrea Nyquist	5x11, Facets
1986	Highway to Heaven	Sandy Clark	2x23, Children's Children
1986	Trapper John, M.D.	Butterfly	7x19, Elusive Butterfly
1987	Cagney & Lacey	Linda Chandler	6x21 & 6x22, Turn, Turn, Turn
1988	21 Jump Street	Betty Sue Fitzgerald	2x14, Chapel of Love; Liz Sagal played Mary Lou Fitzgerald in episode
1989	Quantum Leap	Gloria Collins	2x04, What Price Gloria?
1991	Knots Landing	Amber	13x10, Lost at Sea
1992	Picket Fences	Elena Shannon	1x16, Nuclear Meltdowns, with twin sister Liz Sagal; 1x17, Body Politics
1995	Pointman	N/A	1x11, Storm Warning
