= Liz Sagal =

American actress and writer

- Occupations: Actress; screenwriter
- Years active: 1982–present
- Father: Boris Sagal
- Relatives: Jean Sagal (twin sister); Katey Sagal (sister); Joey Sagal (brother); Jackson White (nephew); Marge Champion (stepmother)

Liz Sagal is an American actress and screenwriter. She is part of a family of entertainment industry professionals. She is the daughter of director Boris Sagal and the stepdaughter of Marge Champion. In addition to her twin sister Jean Sagal, two of her other siblings, older sister Katey Sagal and brother Joey Sagal, are notable in the industry and her other brother, David Sagal, is an attorney married to actress McNally Sagal.

== Early life ==
Sagal's father, Boris Sagal, was a Ukrainian-Jewish immigrant who worked as a television director.

== Career ==
=== Acting ===
Sagal and her twin sister, Jean Sagal served for a time as the "Doublemint Twins" in the ad campaign by Doublemint gum.

The pair also appeared together as cheerleaders in the 1982 movie, Grease 2. In the 1980s, Liz and Jean starred in the television series Double Trouble that ran from 1984 to 1985. Sagal has since appeared on such shows as Knots Landing and Picket Fences.

She played a part in the film Howard the Duck, as a member of the fictional band "Cherry Bomb", in conjunction with which she contributed vocals to the songs "Hunger City", "Don't Turn Away (Reprise)", "It Don't Come Cheap" and "Howard the Duck".

=== Writing ===
Sagal has worked as a writer on such shows as Mad About You, Monk, Charmed and the reboot of Lost in Space. She also wrote for the show Sons of Anarchy on which her sister, Katey, co-starred and her brother-in-law served as showrunner.

== Film credits ==
=== Writer ===
- Mad About You (1997)
- Two Guys, a Girl and a Pizza Place (1998–2002)
- Monk (2004)
- Charmed (2005–2006)
- Vanished (2007)
- Sons of Anarchy (2009–2013)
- Da Vinci's Demons (2015)
- Banshee (2016)
- Feed the Beast (2016)
- Loco x vos (2016)
- Midnight, Texas (2017)
- Lost in Space (2019)
- Cowboy Bebop (2021)

=== Actress ===
- Grease 2 (1982) - Cheerleader Twin
- Double Trouble (1984, TV Series) - Allison Foster
- Howard the Duck (1986) - Ronette, Cherry Bomb
- Skinheads (1989) - Amy
- Life on the Edge (1992) - Mandy
- Picket Fences (1993, TV Series) - Ellen Shannon
