= Marge Champion =

American dancer and actress (1919–2020)

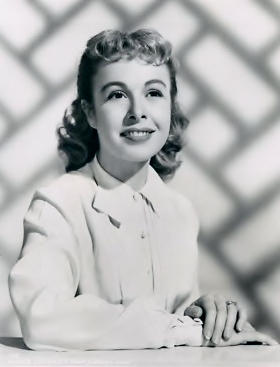
- Champion in 1952
- Born: Marjorie Celeste Belcher; September 2, 1919; Los Angeles, California, U.S.
- Died: October 21, 2020 (aged 101); Los Angeles, California, U.S.
- Education: Hollywood High School
- Occupations: Dancer; actress; choreographer
- Years active: 1930–2001
- Known for: Show Boat; Everything I Have Is Yours; Give a Girl a Break; Three for the Show
- Spouses: Art Babbitt (m. 1937; div. 1940) Gower Champion (m. 1947; div. 1973) Boris Sagal (m. 1977; died 1981)
- Children: 2
- Relatives: Lina Basquette (half-sister); Katey Sagal (stepdaughter); Jean Sagal (stepdaughter); Liz Sagal (stepdaughter); Joey Sagal (stepson)
- Awards: National Museum of Dance and Hall of Fame

Marjorie Celeste Champion (née Belcher; September 2, 1919 – October 21, 2020) was an American dancer and actress. At fourteen, she was hired as a dance model for Walt Disney Studios animated films. Later, she performed as an actress and dancer in film musicals, and in 1957 had a television show based on song and dance. She also did creative choreography for liturgy, and served as a dialogue and movement coach for the 1978 TV miniseries, The Awakening Land, set in the late 18th century in the Ohio Valley.

== Early life ==
Champion was born in Los Angeles on September 2, 1919. Her father, Ernest Belcher, was a dance director who taught Shirley Temple, Betty Grable, Ramon Novarro, Cyd Charisse, Gwen Verdon, Fay Wray and Joan Crawford, as well as Champion's future husband Gower Champion; her mother was Gladys Lee Baskette (née Rosenberg). Champion had an older half sister, Lina Basquette, who began acting in 1916 in silent films. Lina was the daughter of her mother's first husband, Frank Baskette, who died by suicide. Champion and Basquette's maternal grandfather, Lazarus Rosenberg, was Jewish.

Champion began dancing at an early age as her sister had done. She started as a child under the instruction of her father. She studied exclusively with her father from age five until she left for New York. She credited her good health and long career to her father's teaching principles: careful, strict progression of activity, emphasis on correct alignment, precise placement of body, attention to detail and to the totality of dynamics and phrasing. Her first dance partner was Louis Hightower, who was also the live action reference for Prince Charming in Snow White. In 1930, she made her debut in the Hollywood Bowl at age 11 in the ballet "Carnival in Venice". By age twelve, she became a ballet instructor at her father's studio. Champion played Tina in the Hollywood High School operetta The Red Mill. She also sang in the Hollywood High School Girls' Senior Glee Club and graduated in 1936.

She was hired in 1934 at age 14 by the Walt Disney Studio as a dance model for their animated film Snow White and the Seven Dwarfs (1937). Her movements were copied to enhance the realism of the animated Snow White character. For one scene Champion served as model while wrapped in a baggy overcoat for two dwarfs at once, when for the "Silly Song" dance, Dopey gets on Sneezy's shoulder to dance with Snow White. She was not given any credits for her role in the movie because Walt worried that people would assume the animators had simply copied her movements, but her role was revealed in an issue of "Life" on April 4, 1938. Champion later modeled for characters in other animated films: the Blue Fairy in Pinocchio (1940) and Hyacinth Hippo in the Dance of the Hours segment of Fantasia, a ballet parody that she also helped choreograph. She even recalled doing some modeling for Mr. Stork in Dumbo. When working with Disney on Snow White and the Seven Dwarfs, Champion recalled, "the animators couldn't take a young girl out of themselves, they couldn't take the prince out of themselves".

== Career ==
The first picture Champion remembered being in was The Castles with Fred Astaire and Ginger Rogers. This gave her a feeling that she would really like to do movies but what she really wanted to do was go to New York and be in New York shows. Sadly, Champion wasn't tall enough for ballet, which is what she trained all her life for.

After her marriage to Gower Champion, the two performed together as a dance team in MGM musicals of the 1940s and 50s, including their first MGM musical Till the Clouds Roll By (1946), Show Boat (1951) and Everything I Have Is Yours (1952). Other films with Gower included Mr. Music (1950, with Bing Crosby), Give a Girl a Break (1953), Jupiter's Darling (1955), and Three for the Show (1955). MGM wanted the couple to remake Fred Astaire and Ginger Rogers films, but only one, Lovely to Look At (1952), a remake of Roberta (1935), was completed. The couple refused to remake any of the others, the rights to which were still owned by RKO.

Gower and Marge Champion appeared as the Mystery Guests on the May 15, 1955, airing of What's My Line. Mary Healy guessed who they were. They appeared again on the February 8, 1959, airing of the show, with panelist Martin Gabel guessing who they were.

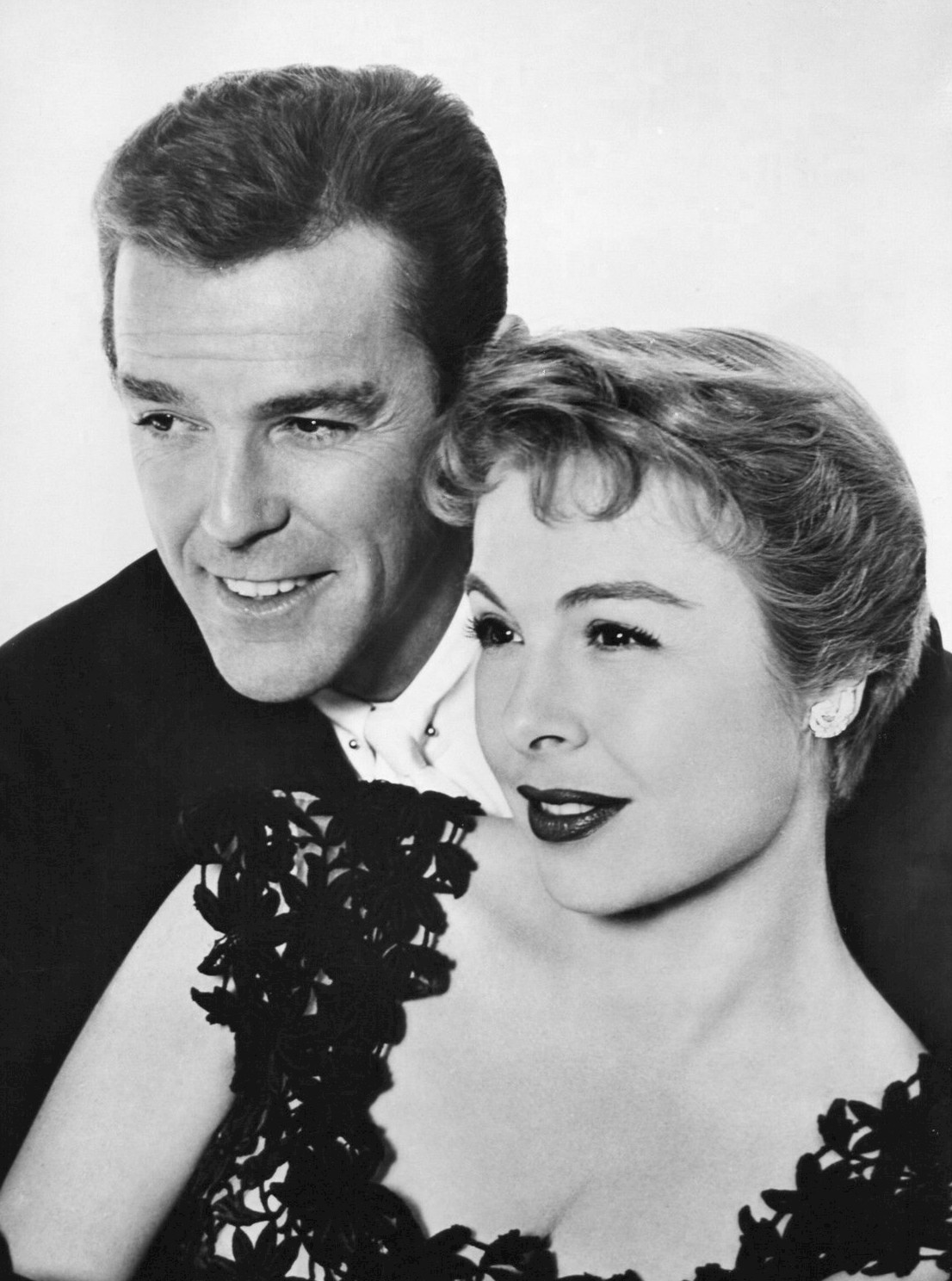
Marge and Gower Champion (1957)

During the summer of 1957, the Champions had their own TV series, The Marge and Gower Champion Show, a situation comedy with song and dance numbers. Marge played a dancer and Gower a choreographer. Real-life drummer Buddy Rich was featured as a fictional drummer named Cozy.

In the 1970s, Champion, actress Marilee Zdenek, and choreographer John West were part of a team at Bel Aire Presbyterian Church that created a number of creative worship services featuring dance and music. They later offered workshops and related liturgical arts programs throughout the country. She and Zdenek co-authored two books, Catch the New Wind and God Is a Verb, related to this work.

Champion served as a dialogue and movement coach for the TV miniseries, The Awakening Land (1978), adapted from Conrad Richter's trilogy of the same name. It was set in the late 18th-century Ohio Valley. She also worked as a dance instructor and choreographer in New York City. She made a rare television acting appearance in 1982 on the dramatic TV series Fame, playing a ballet teacher with a racial bias against African-American students.

=== Stage ===
Champion appeared in several stage musicals and plays on Broadway as a performer. She made her New York debut in What's Up (1943). She also performed in the Dark of the Moon (1945) as the Fair Witch, and Beggar's Holiday (1946) having multiple roles. She made her last Broadway appearance in 3 for Tonight in 1955. She also worked as a choreographer or Assistant, including Lend an Ear in 1948 as assistant to the Choreographer; Make a Wish in 1951, as assistant to Gower Champion; Hello, Dolly! in 1964 as special assistant; and Stepping Out (1987) as choreographic associate. She appeared as Emily Whitman in the 2001 Broadway stage revival of Follies. She stated how "as a dancer, by the time you're 40 you're done. If I ever come back, I want to be an actress – it lasts long. But I was 81 when I was in "Follies".

== Personal life ==
Champion married Art Babbitt, an animator at Disney and creator of Goofy, in August of 1937, when she was 17 and he was 29. They divorced three years later. She married dancer Gower Champion in 1947, and they had two sons (Blake and Gregg). Gower was a student at Champion's father's dance school, and the two met when they were 12 years old. Although performances often took them away from California, Los Angeles remained their home base. They divorced in January 1973.

Champion married director Boris Sagal in 1977. He died four years later on May 22, 1981, in a helicopter accident during the production of the miniseries World War III. She became stepmother to Boris' five children including Katey, Jean, Liz, and Joey. Her son Blake died at the age of 25 in a car accident in 1987.

=== Death ===
Champion died on October 21, 2020, at her son's home in Los Angeles. She was 101.

== Legacy and honors ==
Champion choreographed Whose Life Is It Anyway?, The Day of the Locust, and Queen of the Stardust Ballroom, for which she received an Emmy Award. She was honored with the Disney Legends Award in 2007. Two years later, she was inducted into the National Museum of Dance's Mr. & Mrs. Cornelius Vanderbilt Whitney Hall of Fame In 2013, Champion received The Douglas Watt Lifetime Achievement Award at the Fred and Adele Astaire Awards ceremonies.

Champion was interviewed in numerous documentaries, including for the behind-the-scenes documentary directed by Oscar-winner Chris Innis, The Story of the Swimmer, which was featured on the 2014 Grindhouse Releasing/Box Office Spectaculars Blu-ray/DVD restoration of The Swimmer. She was also interviewed at a screening of The Swimmer by filmmaker Allison Anders for the same release. Champion and Donald Saddler, who met while performing together in the Follies in 2001, are the subjects of a short film about the two dancers leading meaningful lives at age 90. She still danced twice a week with choreographer, actor, and an original member of American Ballet Theatre, Donald Saddler, who first performed at Jacob's Pillow in 1941. The still-spry dance partners were making a documentary "Still Dancing," which chronicles their biweekly dance sessions.

== Selected filmography ==
Year	Title	Role	Notes
1937	Snow White and the Seven Dwarfs	Model for "Snow White"	Uncredited
1938	The Goldwyn Follies	—N/a	Associate choreographer
1939	Honor of the West	Diane Allen	
1939	What a Life	Student in Doorway at Dance	Uncredited
1939	Sorority House	Coed	Uncredited
1940	Pinocchio	Model for "The Blue Fairy"	Uncredited
1940	Fantasia	Model for "Hyacinth Hippo"	Uncredited
1941	Dumbo	Model for "Mr. Stork"	Uncredited
1950	Mr. Music	Herself	
1951	Show Boat	Ellie Mae Shipley	
1952	Lovely to Look At	Clarisse	
1952	Everything I Have Is Yours	Pamela Hubbard	
1953	Give a Girl a Break	Madelyn Corlane	
1955	Three for the Show	Gwen Howard	
1955	Jupiter's Darling	Meta	
1968	The Party	Rosalind Dunphy	
1968	The Swimmer	Peggy Forsburgh	
1970	The Cockeyed Cowboys of Calico County	Mrs. Bester	
1975	The Day of the Locust	—N/a	Dance supervisor
2012	Carol Channing: Larger Than Life	Herself	Documentary

Television
Year	Title	Role	Notes
1949	The Philco Television Playhouse	—N/a	Episode: Dark of the Moon
1953	Lux Video Theatre	Millie	Episode: A Bouquet for Millie
1954	The Red Skelton Hour	Cameo	Episode: Deadeye at the Golden Nugget
1975	Queen of the Stardust Ballroom	—N/a	TV film (Choreographer )
1982	Fame	Ann Carlton	Episode: Beginnings
