= Enoch Arden law =

Legal precedent in the USA

The Enoch Arden law, also known as the Enoch Arden doctrine or Enoch Arden statute, is a legal doctrine that addresses situations where a spouse remarries after their original partner has been absent for an extended period and is presumed dead.

The doctrine is named after the titular character in Alfred, Lord Tennyson's 1864 poem Enoch Arden, which tells the story of a sailor who returns home after years of absence to find his wife remarried.

== Legal principles ==
Under common law, a marriage by a person already legally married was considered void, regardless of the circumstances. The Enoch Arden doctrine modifies this strict rule by introducing a presumption of death and allowing remarriage after a certain period of unexplained absence, typically seven years in most jurisdictions. The doctrine was developed to address the harsh consequences of traditional laws that considered remarriage in such circumstances as bigamy, potentially subjecting the remarrying spouse to criminal prosecution.

== Application and variation ==
The application of the Enoch Arden law varies by jurisdiction. Some states will grant a divorce to the remaining spouse after a specified period of absence. Others provide a legal exemption from bigamy charges if the remarriage occurs after the statutory period, or establish a presumption of death for the absent spouse, allowing the remaining spouse to remarry without legal consequences.
