= David Neumann =

American choreographer, dancer and actor (born 1965)

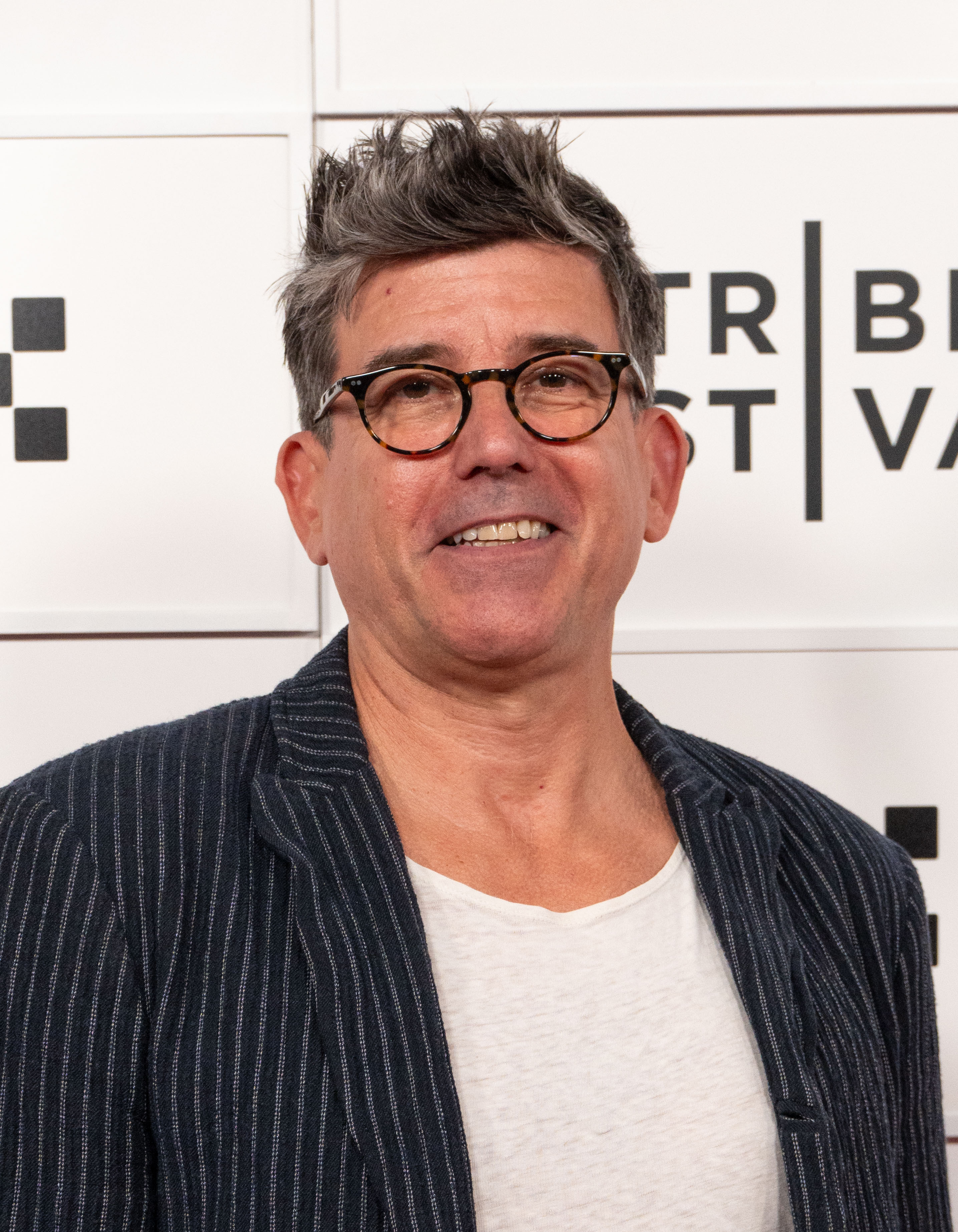
- Neumann in 2026
- Born: 1965 (age 60–61); Paris, France
- Education: South Brunswick High School State University of New York at Purchase
- Occupation: Choreographer
- Spouse: Erica Sweany

David Neumann (born 1965) is an American choreographer, dancer, and actor. He was nominated for the 2019 Tony Award for Best Choreography for Hadestown and won the Chita Rivera Award for Outstanding Choreography in a Broadway Show for the production.

== Early life ==
Neumann was born in Paris and grew up in South Brunswick, New Jersey. He graduated from South Brunswick High School in 1983. He was interested in movement from a young age. Describing his energy as a child, he recalled that his parents devised a “weird bungee cord kind of harness thing, so whenever I got a good burst of speed, I would always return to where I started.”

Neumann participated in his high school's dance company and experimented with popular dance forms in clubs and informal performance spaces. He later performed with Willi Ninja, known for his appearance in the film Paris Is Burning.

Neumann studied theater at the State University of New York at Purchase while continuing to dance. He began working with Doug Elkins during that time and became a founding member of the Doug Elkins Dance Company, with which he worked for eight years.

== Career ==
After graduating in 1988, Neumann continued dancing with the Doug Elkins Dance Company, touring nationally and internationally. He later expanded his work into theatre, opera and film. He has worked with directors including Hal Hartley, Laurie Anderson, Robert Woodruff, Lee Breuer, Peter Sellars, JoAnne Akalaitis, Chris Bayes, Mark Wing-Davey, Daniel Sullivan, Les Waters and Molly Smith.

Neumann received a Bessie Award for performance in 1991 and another for choreography in 1998. In 2019, he won the Chita Rivera Award for Outstanding Choreography in a Broadway Show for Hadestown.

Neumann founded the advanced beginner group in 2001. His work has been supported by grants including the Foundation for Contemporary Arts Grants to Artists award in 2011, a 2009 Creative Capital Award, a 2007 Meet the Composer Grant, a 2004 Rockefeller Foundation Multi-Arts Production grant and a 1993 Princess Grace Fellowship in Theater. The company has received various commissions and has appeared at Jacob's Pillow Dance Festival.

== Personal life ==
Neumann is married to singer and actress Erica Sweany.
