= Spider-Man: Homecoming =

2017 Marvel Studios film

- Theatrical release poster
- Directed by: Jon Watts
- Screenplay by: Jonathan Goldstein; John Francis Daley; Jon Watts; Christopher Ford; Chris McKenna; Erik Sommers
- Story by: Jonathan Goldstein; John Francis Daley
- Based on: Spider-Man by: Stan Lee; Steve Ditko
- Produced by: Kevin Feige; Amy Pascal
- Starring: Tom Holland; Michael Keaton; Jon Favreau; Gwyneth Paltrow; Zendaya; Donald Glover; Jacob Batalon; Laura Harrier; Tony Revolori; Bokeem Woodbine; Tyne Daly; Marisa Tomei; Robert Downey Jr.
- Cinematography: Salvatore Totino
- Edited by: Dan Lebental; Debbie Berman
- Music by: Michael Giacchino
- Production companies: Columbia Pictures; Marvel Studios; Pascal Pictures
- Distributed by: Sony Pictures Releasing
- Release dates: June 28, 2017 (TCL Chinese Theatre); July 7, 2017 (United States)
- Running time: 133 minutes
- Country: United States
- Language: English
- Budget: $175 million
- Box office: $880.9 million

Spider-Man: Homecoming is a 2017 American superhero film based on the Marvel Comics character Spider-Man. Produced by Columbia Pictures, Marvel Studios, and Pascal Pictures, and distributed by Sony Pictures Releasing, it is the second Spider-Man film reboot and the 16th film in the Marvel Cinematic Universe (MCU). Directed by Jon Watts from a screenplay by the writing teams of Jonathan Goldstein and John Francis Daley, Watts and Christopher Ford, and Chris McKenna and Erik Sommers, the film stars Tom Holland as Peter Parker / Spider-Man alongside Michael Keaton, Jon Favreau, Gwyneth Paltrow, Zendaya, Donald Glover, Jacob Batalon, Laura Harrier, Tony Revolori, Bokeem Woodbine, Tyne Daly, Marisa Tomei, and Robert Downey Jr. In the film, Peter tries to balance high school life with being the hero Spider-Man while facing the Vulture (Keaton).

In February 2015, Marvel Studios and Sony reached a deal to share the film rights for Spider-Man, integrating the character into the established MCU. The following June, Holland was cast as Spider-Man, and Watts was hired to direct. Soon after, Daley and Goldstein joined the project. In April 2016, the film's title was revealed, along with additional cast members, including Downey Jr. in his MCU role of Tony Stark / Iron Man. Principal photography began in June 2016 at Pinewood Atlanta Studios in Fayette County, Georgia, and also took place in Atlanta, Los Angeles, New York City, and Berlin. The film's additional screenwriters were revealed during filming, which wrapped in October 2016. The filmmakers made efforts to differentiate the film from previous Spider-Man films.

Spider-Man: Homecoming premiered in Hollywood, Los Angeles, on June 28, 2017, and was released in the United States on July 7, as part of Phase Three of the MCU. The film grossed $880.9 million worldwide, becoming the second-most-successful Spider-Man film and the sixth-highest-grossing film of 2017. It received positive reviews for its light tone, its focus on Peter's high school life, and its acting, particularly of Holland and Keaton. Two direct sequels have been released: Spider-Man: Far From Home (2019) and Spider-Man: No Way Home (2021). A new trilogy of films from Sony and Marvel Studios then began with Spider-Man: Brand New Day (2026).

== Plot ==
Following the Battle of New York in 2012, (Note: As depicted in The Avengers (2012)) Adrian Toomes and his salvage company are contracted to clean up the city, but their operation is taken over by the Department of Damage Control (DODC), a partnership between Tony Stark and the U.S. government. Enraged at being driven out of business, Toomes persuades his employees to keep the Chitauri technology they have already scavenged and use it to create and sell advanced weapons, including a flying Vulture suit Toomes uses to steal Chitauri power cells.

Eight years later, (Note: In November 2018, the Marvel Studios: The First 10 Years sourcebook adjusted the film's placement in the MCU timeline, ignoring the "eight years later" title card which was perceived to be a continuity error. In October 2023, the book The Marvel Cinematic Universe: An Official Timeline further addressed the film's placement in the timeline as occurring in "Fall 2016", while noting that the eight years timeframe was incorrect and confirming that four years had passed in-universe. See Marvel Cinematic Universe timeline for more.) after being drafted into the Avengers by Stark to help with an internal dispute in Germany, (Note: As depicted in Captain America: Civil War (2016)) teenager Peter Parker resumes his studies at the Midtown School of Science and Technology when Stark tells him he is not ready to become a full-time Avenger. Peter quits his school's academic decathlon team to spend more time focusing on his crime-fighting activities as Spider-Man. His best friend, Ned, eventually discovers his secret identity.

Peter comes across Toomes's associates Jackson Brice / Shocker and Herman Schultz selling weapons to local criminal Aaron Davis. Peter saves Davis before being caught by Toomes in the Vulture suit and dropped into a lake. He nearly drowns but is rescued by Stark, who warns him against further involvement with the criminals. Meanwhile, Toomes accidentally kills Brice with one of their weapons and Schultz becomes the new Shocker.

Peter and Ned study a weapon Brice left behind, and remove its power core. When a tracking device on Schultz indicates he is traveling to Maryland, Peter rejoins the decathlon team and accompanies them to Washington, D.C. for a national tournament. Ned and Peter disable a tracking device Stark implanted in the Spider-Man suit, and unlock its advanced features. Peter tries to stop Toomes from stealing weapons from a DODC truck but is trapped inside, causing him to miss the decathlon tournament. When he discovers that the power core is an unstable Chitauri grenade, he races to the Washington Monument, where the core is activated and explodes, trapping a group of Peter's decathlon teammates in an elevator. Peter breaks inside and saves everyone, including his crush Liz. Days later, Peter captures Toomes's new buyer Mac Gargan aboard the Staten Island Ferry, but Toomes escapes while a malfunctioning weapon tears the ferry in half. Stark arrives and helps Peter save the passengers, but confiscates Peter's suit as punishment for his recklessness.

Peter returns to his high school life and asks Liz to the homecoming dance. On the night of the dance, Peter discovers that Toomes is Liz's father, and Toomes deduces that Peter is Spider-Man. After Toomes threatens him, Peter realizes Toomes is planning to hijack a DODC plane transporting weapons from Avengers Tower to the team's new headquarters in Upstate New York.

Peter leaves the dance and dons his old homemade Spider-Man suit. He is ambushed by Schultz, but defeats him with Ned's help. Peter races to Toomes's compound, where Toomes attacks him and leaves him to die under a pile of rubble. Peter finds the strength to escape and intercepts the plane, steering it to crash on the beach at Coney Island. He and Toomes fight, with Peter eventually saving Toomes's life after the damaged Vulture suit explodes. Peter leaves Toomes for the police. Following Toomes's arrest, Liz moves away and Peter declines an invitation from Stark to join the Avengers full time. Back in his bedroom, Peter puts on the Spider-Man suit that Stark returned to him, just before his aunt May walks in.

In a mid-credits scene, an incarcerated Gargan approaches Toomes in prison. He says he heard that Toomes knows Spider-Man's real identity, but Toomes denies this.

== Cast ==
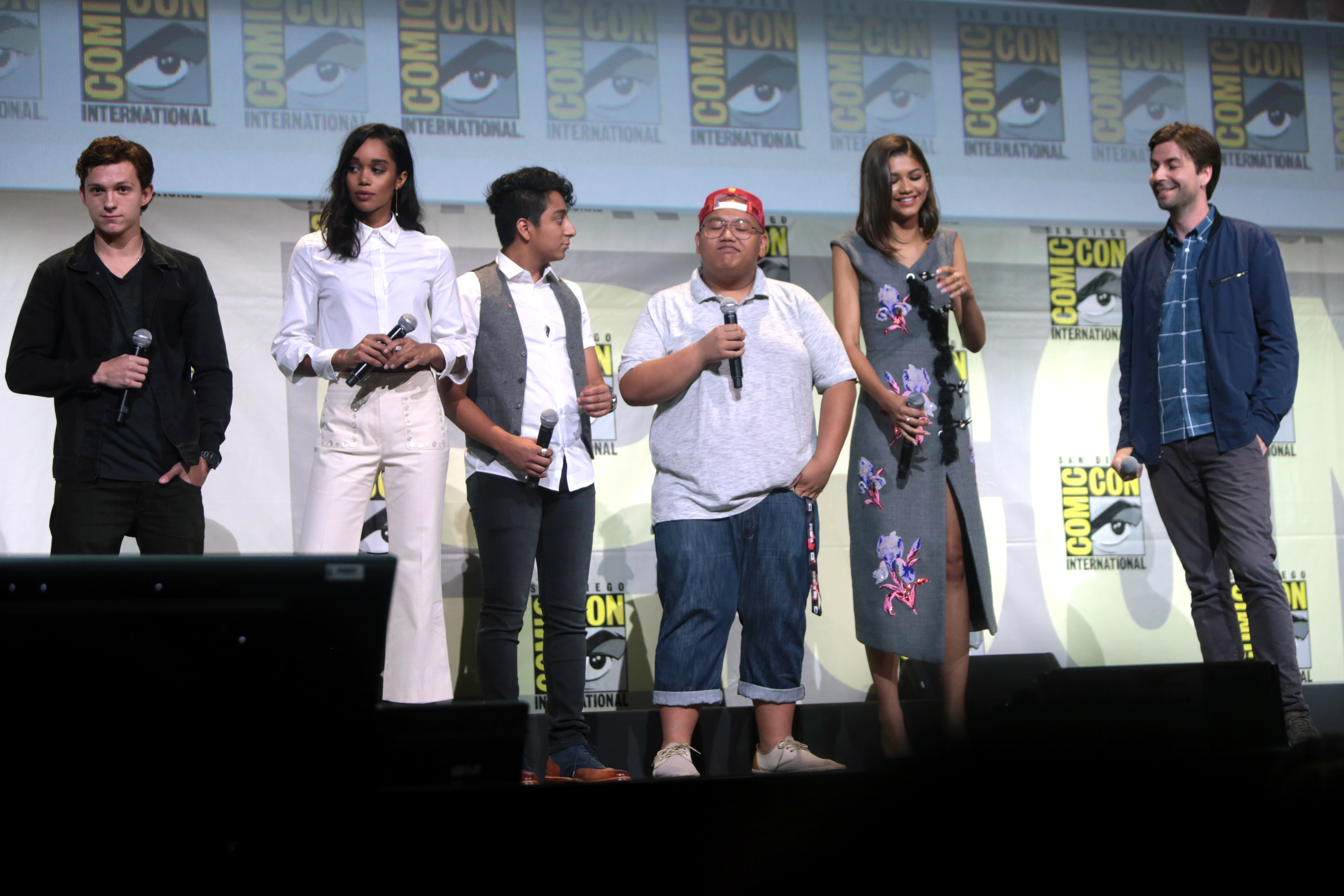
(L–R) Tom Holland, Laura Harrier, Tony Revolori, Jacob Batalon, Zendaya, and director Jon Watts promoting Spider-Man: Homecoming at the 2016 San Diego Comic-Con

- Tom Holland as Peter Parker / Spider-Man:
  A 15-year-old who gained spider-like abilities after being bitten by a radioactive spider. Producers Kevin Feige and Amy Pascal were impressed by Holland's performances in projects such as the films The Impossible (2012) and In the Heart of the Sea (2015), and the television series Wolf Hall (2015). Holland took inspiration from previous Spider-Man actors Tobey Maguire and Andrew Garfield but also hoped to deliver something "new and exciting" with his take on the character, which was the first to focus on Peter "dealing with everyday problems that a 15-year-old deals with as well as trying to save the city". Holland attended the Bronx High School of Science in the Bronx for a few days to prepare for the role. A student he spoke with did not believe he had been cast as Spider-Man, which Holland felt boded well for his role in the film, as various characters do not suspect Peter of being Spider-Man. It took 25 to 45 minutes for Holland to get into costume, depending on if he had to wear a stunt harness underneath the suit. Holland initially signed on for six MCU films, including three Spider-Man films.
- Michael Keaton as Adrian Toomes / Vulture:
  A salvager-turned-arms-trafficker after his company is forced out of business. He uses a suit with mechanical wings forged from Chitauri technology. Toomes is revealed to be the father of Liz, Peter's love interest. Director Jon Watts wanted him to be a "regular guy", closer to John C. Reilly's Nova Corpsman Rhomann Dey from the Marvel Cinematic Universe (MCU) film Guardians of the Galaxy (2014) than other villains in the franchise like Thanos and Ultron, to go with Spider-Man as a "regular kid who becomes a superhero". This helped avoid Toomes drawing the attention of the Avengers, and provided someone that Peter would be able to defeat while still learning to use his abilities. Keaton said Toomes was not completely villainous, as "there's parts of him that you go, 'You know what? I might see his point.'" Co-producer Eric Hauserman Carroll likened Toomes to "the dark Tony Stark", a "businessman with a family. He wants to look out for his kids ... He doesn't have these big delusions of grandeur where he wants to take over the world, or replace the government, or even defeat the Avengers or anything. He just wants his shot at the good life." Keaton was not hesitant to portray another comic book character after playing Batman in Tim Burton's 1989 film and its 1992 sequel.
- Jon Favreau as Happy Hogan:
  The former head of security for Stark Industries and Tony Stark's driver and bodyguard. Hogan is "looking after" Peter in the film, with Favreau saying that Peter "needs someone to help him out". Favreau previously portrayed Hogan in the Iron Man films, having also directed the first two of those, and described returning as just an actor as fun, allowing him "to maintain the relationship with the MCU ... Especially when the filmmakers are taking care of you, and taking care of the characters and the story."
- Gwyneth Paltrow as Pepper Potts: Tony Stark's fiancée and the CEO of Stark Industries.
- Zendaya as Michelle:
  One of Peter's classmates, also known as "MJ". Zendaya, calling her awkward but intellectual, said that "she just feels like she doesn't need to talk to people" because of her intelligence. She added that it was "refreshing" that Michelle was weird and different, feeling that "a lot of young people—especially young women—can relate to that." Watts likened the character to Ally Sheedy's Allison Reynolds from the film The Breakfast Club (1985) or Linda Cardellini's Lindsay Weir from the television series Freaks and Geeks (1999–2000). The character is not a direct adaptation of Mary Jane Watson, but was given the initials "MJ" to "remind [fans] of that dynamic", with the writers "plant[ing] the seeds in this movie" for comparisons to Watson, but also making her "wholly different". Feige added that Michelle is "not obsessed with" Peter like Watson is at times in the comics, "she's just observant". Her full name, Michelle Jones-Watson, was revealed in the sequel Spider-Man: No Way Home (2021).
- Donald Glover as Aaron Davis:
  A criminal looking to purchase weapons from Toomes. The character's moniker from the comics, "Prowler", is listed as one of his aliases, although he is not referred to as such in the film. Davis is the uncle of Miles Morales, an inheritor of the Spider-Man mantle, in the comics. Glover voiced Morales in the television series Ultimate Spider-Man (2012–2017), and campaigned to portray Spider-Man in a film in 2010. Watts was aware of the campaign, and as soon as he was hired he asked Feige about casting Glover. The role was designed as "a surprise treat for fans", with Davis mentioning his nephew to set up Morales potentially appearing in a future MCU film. Watts insisted Glover accept the part, assuring him that if he declined the offer, he would have scrapped Davis from the film.
- Jacob Batalon as Ned:
  Peter's best friend, who is a "complete gamer". Batalon described him as "the quintessential best guy, the best man, the number two guy, the guy in the chair" for Peter. Marvel used Ned Leeds as a basis for the character, who does not have a last name in the script or film, but essentially created their own character with him. Carroll said that Ned and other characters in the film are composites of several of their favorites from Spider-Man comics, notably Ganke Lee, who is Morales' best friend in Ultimate Comics: All-New Spider-Man (2011–2013). He is given the last name "Leeds" in the sequel Spider-Man: Far From Home (2019), which was confirmed in No Way Home.
- Laura Harrier as Liz: A senior, Peter's love interest, and Toomes's daughter, with a "type-A" personality.
- Tony Revolori as Flash:
  Peter's rival and classmate. It was noted that the character is generally depicted as a white bully in the comics; the Guatemalan American actor received death threats upon his casting. Revolori worked hard "to do him justice", as he is an important character to the fans. Rather than being a physically imposing jock, Flash Thompson was reimagined as "a rich, smug kid" to reflect modern views of bullying, by crafting him more into a social media bully and rival for Peter opposed to a jock; this depiction was largely informed by Holland's visit to the Bronx High School of Science. Revolori said that Flash has to work hard to match Peter's intelligence, which is "one of the reasons he doesn't like Peter. Everyone else seems to like Peter, so he's like, why don't they like me like they like him?" Revolori gained 60 lb (27 kg) for the role.
- Bokeem Woodbine as Herman Schultz / Shocker: An accomplice of Toomes who is the second person to use modified, vibro-blast shooting versions of Brock Rumlow's gauntlets.
- Tyne Daly as Anne Marie Hoag: The head of the U.S. Department of Damage Control.
- Marisa Tomei as May Parker:
  Peter's aunt. First reports of Tomei's casting caused backlash on social media, with comic book fans opining that the actress was "too young and attractive to portray the character", especially after the character had previously been depicted by actresses older than Tomei. Regarding the casting, Captain America: Civil War (2016) co-writer Stephen McFeely said that, for the MCU, they were trying to make Peter "as naturalistic as possible...That's partly why his aunt isn't 80 years old; if she's the sister of his dead mother, why does she have to be two generations ahead?" Carroll added that the creative team was looking for more of a "big sister" or someone closer in age to Peter Parker in the casting process. After researching the character, Tomei did make "a case to age me up, but no they didn't do it". Tomei felt there was a "blank slate" from which she could develop the character, and talked to Watts about May being "a community organizer or invested in the neighborhood" to indicate where Peter's values come from.
- Robert Downey Jr. as Tony Stark / Iron Man:
  A self-described genius, billionaire, playboy, philanthropist, and an Avenger with electromechanical suits of armor of his own invention who is Peter's mentor and the creator of the U.S. Department of Damage Control. Sony Pictures Motion Picture Group chairman Tom Rothman noted that, beyond the commercial advantage of featuring Downey in the film, the inclusion of Stark was important due to the relationship established between him and Peter in Captain America: Civil War. Watts noted that after Stark's actions in Civil War, introducing Peter to life as an Avenger, there are "a lot of repercussions to that. Is it a first step towards Tony as some sort of mentor figure? Is he comfortable with that?" Co-writer Jonathan Goldstein compared Stark to Ethan Hawke's father character in the film Boyhood (2014).

Additionally, Kerry Condon and Chris Evans reprise their roles as F.R.I.D.A.Y. and Steve Rogers / Captain America from previous MCU films, respectively. Rogers appears in public service announcements played at Peter's school. Garcelle Beauvais portrays Doris Toomes, Adrian's wife and Liz's mother, and Jennifer Connelly provides the voice of Karen, the A.I. in Peter's suit. Hemky Madera appears as Mr. Delmar, the owner of a local bodega, while Gary Weeks portrays Damage Control agent Foster. Logan Marshall-Green plays Jackson Brice, the first Shocker, who is an accomplice of Toomes who uses modified, vibro-blast shooting versions of Brock Rumlow's gauntlets. Other business partners of Toomes include: Michael Chernus as Phineas Mason, Michael Mando as Mac Gargan, and Christopher Berry as Randy Vale.

Faculty at Peter's high school include: Kenneth Choi, who previously played Jim Morita in the MCU, as Jim's descendant Principal Morita; Hannibal Buress as Coach Wilson, the school's gym teacher, who he described as "one of the dumbass characters that don't realize [Peter is] Spider-Man"; Martin Starr, who reprises his previously unnamed role from the MCU film The Incredible Hulk (2008), as Mr. Harrington, a teacher and academic decathlon coach; Selenis Leyva as Ms. Warren; Tunde Adebimpe as Mr. Cobbwell; and John Penick as Mr. Hapgood. Peter's classmates include: Isabella Amara as Sally; Jorge Lendeborg Jr. as Jason Ionello; Josie Totah (Note: Credited as J.J. Totah; the film was released before Totah came out as transgender.) as Seymour; Abraham Attah as Abraham; Tiffany Espensen as Cindy; Angourie Rice as Betty Brant; Michael Barbieri as Charles; and Ethan Dizon as Tiny. Martha Kelly appears in the film as a tour guide, Zach Cherry appears as a street vendor who asks Spider-Man to "do a flip", and Kirk Thatcher makes a cameo appearance as a "punk", an homage to his role in the film Star Trek IV: The Voyage Home (1986). Spider-Man co-creator Stan Lee also has a cameo, as a New York City apartment resident named Gary who witnesses Peter's confrontation with a neighbor.

== Production ==
=== Development ===
There are so many things from the comics that haven't been done yet ... stories [that Spider-Man is] in high school for a lot of it. We want to explore that. That also makes him very, very different from any of our other characters in the MCU

— Kevin Feige, President of Marvel Studios

Following the November 2014 hacking of Sony's computers, emails between Sony Pictures Entertainment co-chairman Amy Pascal and president Doug Belgrad were released, stating that Sony wanted Marvel Studios to produce a new trilogy of Spider-Man films while Sony retained "creative control, marketing, and distribution". Discussions between Sony and Marvel broke down, and Sony planned to proceed with its own slate of Spider-Man films. However, in February 2015, Sony Pictures and Marvel Studios announced that they would release a new Spider-Man film, with Kevin Feige and Pascal producing (the latter through her company Pascal Pictures). The character would first appear in an earlier Marvel Cinematic Universe (MCU) film, later revealed to be Captain America: Civil War (2016). Marvel Studios would explore opportunities to integrate MCU characters into future Spider-Man films, which Sony Pictures would continue to finance, distribute, and have final creative control over. Both studios have the ability to terminate the agreement at any point, and no money was exchanged with the deal. However, a small adjustment was made to a 2011 deal that gave Marvel full control of Spider-Man's merchandising rights, in exchange for a one-time payment of $175 million to Sony and paying up to $35 million for each future Spider-Man film rather than receiving their previous five percent of a Spider-Man film's revenue—Marvel could now reduce their $35 million payment if the co-produced film grossed more than $750 million. Marvel Studios still received five percent of first dollar gross for the film. Lone Star Funds also co-financed the film with Sony, via its LSC Film Corporation deal, covering 25 percent of the $175 million budget, while Columbia Pictures officially served as co-producer with Marvel Studios. Sony also paid Marvel Studios an undisclosed producer fee.

Marvel had been working to add Spider-Man to the Marvel Cinematic Universe since at least October 2014, when they announced their slate of Phase Three films, with Feige saying, "Marvel doesn't announce anything officially until it's set in stone. So we went forward with that Plan A in October, with the Plan B being, if [the deal] were to happen with Sony, how it would all shift. We've been thinking about [the Spider-Man film] as long as we've been thinking about Phase Three." Avi Arad and Matt Tolmach, producers for The Amazing Spider-Man series, were set to serve as executive producers, with neither director Marc Webb nor actor Andrew Garfield returning for the new film. Sony was reportedly looking for an actor younger than Garfield to play Spider-Man, with Logan Lerman and Dylan O'Brien considered front-runners. In March 2015, Drew Goddard was being considered to write and direct the film, while O'Brien said he had not been approached for the role. Goddard, who was previously attached to a Sony film based on the Sinister Six, later said he declined to work on the new film as he thought he "didn't really have an idea" for it and struggled with the idea of working on a new film after spending a year working on the Sinister Six film and being in that mindset. The following month, while promoting Avengers: Age of Ultron (2015), Feige said the character of Peter Parker would be around 15 to 16 years old in the film, which would not be an origin story, since "there have been two retellings of that origin in the last [thirteen years, so] we are going to take it for granted that people know that, and the specifics". Peter's Uncle Ben is still referenced in the film, but not by name. There was some discussion to include a direct reference to Ben when Peter is getting ready for his homecoming by the revelation that his wardrobe consisted of Ben's clothes, but the writers desisted because they felt that the moment veered away from Peter's character arc and made Ben's death feel like a "throwaway line". Later in April, Nat Wolff, Asa Butterfield, Tom Holland, Timothée Chalamet, and Liam James were under consideration by Sony and Marvel to play Spider-Man, with Holland and Butterfield as the front-runners. Joseph Quinn, Chandler Riggs, and Zachary Gordon also auditioned for the role.

In May 2015, Jonathan Levine, Ted Melfi, Jason Moore, the writing team of John Francis Daley and Jonathan Goldstein, and Jared Hess were being considered to direct the film. Destin Daniel Cretton had a meeting with Marvel Studios producer Jeremy Latcham about directing, which he felt "didn't go anywhere" because he had not created a worthwhile pitch. Butterfield, Holland, Judah Lewis, Matt Lintz, Charlie Plummer, and Charlie Rowe screen-tested for the lead role against Robert Downey Jr., who portrays Tony Stark / Iron Man in the MCU, for "chemistry". The six were chosen out of a search of over 1,500 actors to test in front of Feige, Pascal, and the Russo brothers—the directors of Captain America: Civil War. Lintz would later be cast as Bruno Carrelli in the Marvel Studios Disney+ series Ms. Marvel (2022). By early June 2015, Levine and Melfi had become the favorites to direct the film, with Daley and Goldstein and Jon Watts also in consideration, while Feige and Pascal narrowed the actors considered to Holland and Rowe, with both screen-testing with Downey again. Holland also tested with Chris Evans, who portrays Steve Rogers / Captain America in the MCU and emerged as the favorite. Jon Bernthal also advised Holland to showcase his athletic skills during his audition tape. On June 23, Marvel and Sony officially announced that Holland would star as Spider-Man and that Watts would direct the film. The Russos "were pretty vocal about who [sic] [they] wanted for the part", pushing to cast an actor close to the age of Peter Parker to differentiate from the previous portrayals. They also praised Holland for having a dancing and gymnastics background. Watts was able to read the Civil War script, talk with the Russos, and was on set for the filming of Spider-Man's scenes in that film. He was able to "see what they were doing with it" and provide "ideas about this and that", including what Peter's bedroom and wardrobe looked like "so that my movie transitions seamlessly with theirs". On joining the MCU and directing the film, Watts said he was excited to explore the "ground level" of the MCU, a world where characters like the Avengers exist but have only been depicted in previous films at "the Penthouse level of the Marvel world".

Before getting the job of director, Watts created images of Nick Fury as Peter's mentor in the story in early "mood reels" saying, "I don't know what the situation would be, but that would be a person he'd want to get in trouble with." Feige said the films of John Hughes would be a major influence and that Peter's personal growth and development would be just as important as his role as Spider-Man. He noted that "at that age, in high school, everything feels like life or death". He also said that the film hoped to use one of Spider-Man's rogues that have not been seen in film yet, and that filming would begin in June 2016. In July 2015, it was reported that Marisa Tomei had been offered the role of May Parker, Peter's aunt. It was also revealed that Daley and Goldstein, after missing out on the director role, had begun negotiations to write the screenplay, and were given three days to present Marvel with their pitch; both confirmed shortly after that they had reached a deal to write the screenplay. The pair had proposed a take on the character that was "diametrically opposed" to the previous Spider-Man films, creating a laundry list of all the elements seen in those films and actively trying to avoid re-using them. They chose to focus on the high school aspects of the character rather than the "drama and weight of the tragedy that leads to the origin of Spider-Man". They felt this would differentiate him from the other MCU superheroes as well. Daley said the film was about Peter "finding his place" in the MCU, with the writing team wanting the film to focus on him "coming to terms with his new abilities and not yet being good with them, and carrying with him some real human fears and weaknesses", such as a fear of heights when he has to scale the Washington Monument. Daley noted, "Even within the context of this movie, I don't think you would feel that fear of heights or even the vertigo the audience feels in that scene if you establish him as swinging from skyscrapers at the top of the movie." The writers also wanted to avoid the skyscrapers of Manhattan because of how often they were used in the other films, and instead wrote the character into locations such as "the suburbs, on a golf course, the Staten Island Ferry, Coney Island, and even Washington, D.C." One of the first sequences they pitched was "seeing Spider-Man attached to a plane 10,000 feet up in the air, where he had absolutely no safety net. ... you're familiar with the sort of areas he's been in, [so] why not turn it on its head and make it something different that people haven't seen before?" The pair conceded that the film took a more grounded, "low-stakes" approach than previous films, which avoided having to explain why the Avengers were not helping, since a world-threatening problem would logically require the "big guys".

Marvel encouraged Daley and Goldstein to express their own sense of humor in the script, with Daley saying, "When you're seeing the world through the eyes of a fun, funny kid, you can really embrace that voice, and not give him the cookie-cutter one-liners that you're so accustomed to hearing from Peter Parker." Inspired by their experiences working on sitcoms, the writers also looked to create "a network of strong characters" to surround Peter with in the film. In October 2015, Watts said he was looking to make the film a coming-of-age story to see the growth of Peter, citing Can't Buy Me Love (1987), Say Anything... (1989), and Almost Famous (2000) as some of his favorite films in that genre. It was this aspect of the film that had initially got Watts interested in directing it, as he had already been looking to make a coming-of-age story when he heard that the new Spider-Man would be younger than previous incarnations. Watts re-read the original Spider-Man comics in preparation for the film, and "came to a new realization" about the character's original popularity, feeling that he introduced a new perspective to the comics that had already established "a crazy spectacular Marvel Universe ... to give a regular person's perspective on it". He felt that this was also the responsibility of this film since it had to introduce Spider-Man to the already established MCU. Specific comics that Watts noted as potential influences were Ultimate Spider-Man (2000–2011) and Spider-Man Loves Mary Jane (2004–2009). In December, Oliver Scholl signed on to be the production designer for the film.

=== Pre-production ===
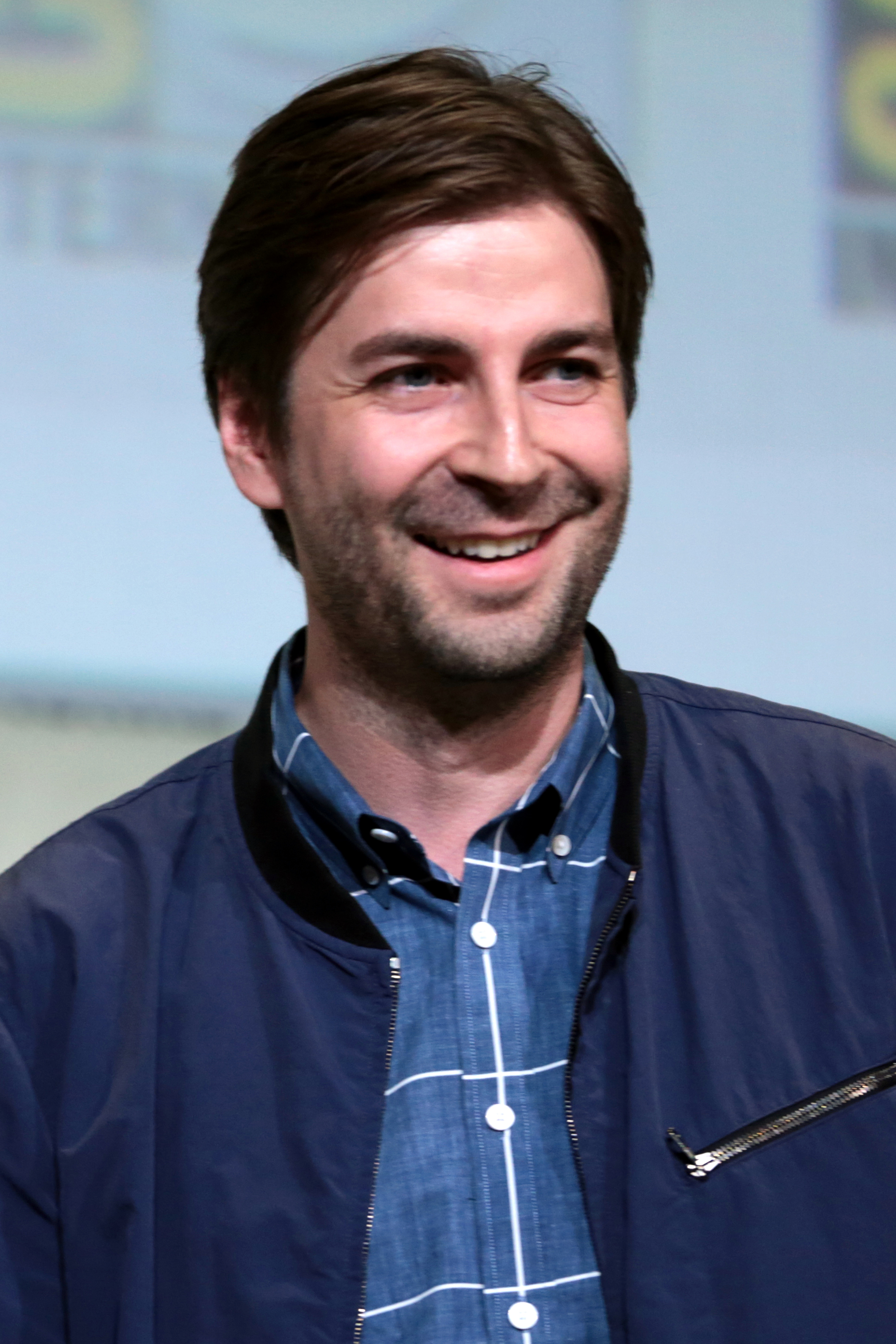
Watts promoting Spider-Man: Homecoming at the 2016 San Diego Comic-Con

Watts wanted to heavily pre-visualize the film, especially its action sequences, as he does on all his films. For Homecoming, Watts worked with a team to "figure out the visual language for the action sequences and ... try stuff out before" filming began to help Watts practice given his lack of experience working on large-scale films. For the "web-slinging" sequences, Watts wanted to avoid the big "swoopy" camera moves that had been previously used and instead "keep it all as grounded as possible. So, whether it was shooting with a drone camera or a helicopter or a cable-cam, or even just handheld, up on a roof chasing after him, I wanted it to feel like we were there with him."

In January 2016, Sony shifted the film's release date from July 28, 2017, to July 7, 2017, and said the film would be digitally remastered for IMAX 3D in post-production. J. K. Simmons expressed interest in reprising his role as J. Jonah Jameson from Sam Raimi's Spider-Man films. In early March, Zendaya was cast in the film as Michelle, and Tomei was confirmed as May Parker. The following month, Feige confirmed that characters from previous MCU films would appear, and clarified that the deal formed with Sony does not specify which characters can and cannot crossover. He noted that the sharing between the studios was done with "good faith" in order "to have more toys to play with as we put together a story", and that "the agreement was that it is very much a Sony Pictures movie... we are the creative producers. We are the ones hiring the actor, introducing him in [Civil War], and then working right now on the script and soon to be shooting." Sony Pictures chairman Tom Rothman further added that Sony has final greenlight authority, but were deferring creatively to Marvel. At CinemaCon 2016, Sony announced the title of the film to be Spider-Man: Homecoming, a reference to the common high school tradition homecoming as well as the character "coming home" to Marvel and the MCU. Tony Revolori – who had auditioned for Peter Parker – and Laura Harrier joined the cast as classmates of Peter's, and Downey Jr. was revealed to be in the film as Stark. Watts noted that Stark "was always a part of" the film's story because of his interactions with Peter in Civil War. Downey Jr. was paid $10 million for his involvement.

Also in April, Michael Keaton entered talks to play a villain, but dropped out of discussions shortly thereafter due to scheduling conflicts with the film The Founder (2016). At this point, John Leguizamo was approached to fill the role and entered negotiations to do so. Keaton soon reentered talks for the role after a change in schedule for The Founder, which necessitated Marvel to ask Leguizamo if he would step away from the role in order to cast Keaton; Keaton closed the deal in late May. Marvel offered to cast Leguizamo in another role, which he considered "tiny" and declined. Mark Hamill was interested in playing the film's villain in case Keaton turned down the offer, but Keaton reconsidered the offer in time. Feige had also reached out to Lin-Manuel Miranda for the role. Miranda declined, despite enjoying the MCU films and wishing to have a role in the universe, because he would have needed to start filming right after completing his run as Alexander Hamilton in his musical Hamilton, and he felt he would have been "deeply miscast". In June, Michael Barbieri was cast as a friend of Peter's, Kenneth Choi was cast as Peter's high school principal, and Logan Marshall-Green was cast as another villain alongside Keaton's character, while Donald Glover and Martin Starr joined the cast in undisclosed roles. Watts said that he wanted the cast to reflect Queens as "one of [the] most diverse places in the world", with Feige adding that "we want everyone to recognize themselves in every portion of our universe. [With this cast] especially, it really feels like this is absolutely what has to happen and continue." This is also different from the previous films, which were "set in a lily-white Queens high school". Additionally, Marvel made a conscious decision to mostly avoid including or referencing characters who appeared in previous Spider-Man films, outside of major ones like Peter and May Parker, and Flash Thompson. This included the Daily Bugle, with co-producer Eric Hauserman Carroll saying, "We toyed with it for a while, but again, we didn't want to go down that road right away, and if we do do a Daily Bugle, we want to do it in a way that feels contemporary". This also included the character Mary Jane Watson, but Zendaya's Michelle was eventually given the initials "MJ" as a nod to that character. Feige said that the point of this is "to have fun with [references] while at the same time having it be different characters that can provide a different dynamic".

Spider-Man's costume in the film has more technical improvements than the previous suits, including the logo on the chest being a remote drone, an AI system similar to Stark's J.A.R.V.I.S., a holographic interface, a parachute, a tracking device for Stark to track Peter, a heater, an airbag, the ability to light up, and the ability to augment reality with the eyepieces. Stark also builds in a "training wheels" protocol, to initially limit Peter's access to all of its features. Carroll noted Marvel went through the comics and "pull[ed] out all the sort of fun and wacky things the suit did" to include in the Homecoming suit. Spider-Man's web-shooters have various settings, first teased at the end of Civil War, which Carroll explained allowed him to "adjust the spray" to different settings like the spinning web, web ball, or ricochet web. He compared this to a DSLR camera.

=== Filming ===
Principal photography began on June 20, 2016, at Pinewood Atlanta Studios in Fayette County, Georgia, under the working title Summer of George. Salvatore Totino served as director of photography. Filming also took place in Atlanta, with locations including Grady High School, Downtown Atlanta, the Atlanta Marriott Marquis, Piedmont Park, the Georgia World Congress Center, and the West End neighborhood. Holland said building New York sets in Atlanta was cheaper than actually filming in New York, a location closely associated with the character, though the production may "end up [in New York] for one week or two". A replica of the Staten Island Ferry was built in Atlanta, with the ability to open and close in half in 10 to 12 seconds and be flooded with 40,000 gallons of water in 8 seconds. Additional filming also occurred at two magnet schools in the Van Nuys and Reseda neighborhoods of Los Angeles.

Casting continued after the start of production, with the inclusion of Isabella Amara, Jorge Lendeborg Jr., Josie Totah, Hannibal Buress, Selenis Leyva, Abraham Attah, Michael Mando, Tyne Daly, Garcelle Beauvais, Tiffany Espensen, and Angourie Rice in unspecified roles, with Bokeem Woodbine joining as an additional villain. At San Diego Comic-Con in 2016, Marvel confirmed the castings of Keaton, Zendaya, Glover, Harrier, Revolori, Daly, and Woodbine, while revealing Zendaya, Harrier, and Revolori's roles as Michelle, Liz Allan, and Flash Thompson, respectively, and announcing the casting of Jacob Batalon as Ned. Lewis Pullman also auditioned for Ned. It was also revealed that the Adrian Toomes / Vulture would be the film's villain, while the writing teams of Watts and Christopher Ford, and Chris McKenna and Erik Sommers, joined Goldstein and Daley in writing the screenplay, from Goldstein and Daley's story. Eric Pearson, a member of Marvel Studios's writing program who had written the Marvel One-Shot films, did uncredited work on the film as well. Watts praised Goldstein and Daley's drafts as "really fun and funny", and said that they "sort of established the broad strokes of the movie", with him and Ford, close friends since childhood, then re-writing the script based on specific ideas that Watts had and things that he wanted to film, which he said was a "pretty substantial structural pass, rearranging things and building it into the sort of story arc we wanted it to be". McKenna and Sommers then joined the film to deal with changes to the script during filming, as "it's all a little bit flexible when you get to set. You try things out, and you just need someone to be writing while you're shooting."

Harrier noted that the young actors in the film "constantly refer to ourselves as The Breakfast Club". Shortly after, Martha Kelly joined the cast in an unspecified role. In August, Michael Chernus was cast as Phineas Mason / Tinkerer, while Jona Xiao joined the cast in an unspecified role, and Buress said he was playing a gym teacher. By September 2016, Jon Favreau was reprising his role as Happy Hogan from the Iron Man series, and filming concluded in Atlanta and moved to New York City. Locations in the latter city included Astoria, Queens; Sunnyside, Queens; St. George, Staten Island; Manhattan; and Franklin K. Lane High School in Brooklyn. Additionally, UFC fighter Tyron Woodley said he had been considered for a villain role in the film, but had to drop out due to a prior commitment with Fox Sports. Principal photography wrapped on October 2, 2016, in New York City, with some additional filming taking place later in the month in Berlin, Germany, near the Brandenburg Gate.

=== Post-production ===
In November 2016, Feige confirmed that Keaton would play Adrian Toomes / Vulture, while Woodbine was revealed as Herman Schultz / Shocker. In March 2017, Harrier said the film was undergoing re-shoots, and Evans was set to appear as Steve Rogers / Captain America in an instructional fitness video. Watts was inspired by The President's Fitness Challenge for this, feeling that Captain America would be the obvious version of that for the MCU. He then started brainstorming other public service announcements (PSA) starring Captain America, about "just anything you could think of, we had poor Captain America do it". Watts said that many of the additional PSA videos would be featured on the home media of the film. According to Goldstein, additional videos featuring other Avengers were planned at some point. Watts confirmed that the company Stark creates that leads Toomes on his villainous path in the film is Damage Control, which Watts felt "just fit in with our overall philosophy with the kind of story we wanted to tell" and created a lot of practical questions Watts wanted to use "to drive the story".

The film features multiple post-credit scenes. The first gives the Vulture a chance at redemption, showing him protect Peter from another villain. Watts said this "was a really interesting thing in the development of the story. You couldn't just rely on the tropes of the villain being a murderer and killing a bunch of people. He had to be redeemable in some capacity in the end and that he believes everything he said, especially about his family." The second post-credits scene is an additional Captain America PSA, where he talks about the value of patience—a meta-referential joke at the expense of the audience, who have just waited through the film's credits to see the scene. This was a "last-minute addition" to the film. Watts completed work on Homecoming at the beginning of June 2017, approving the final visual effects shots. He stated that he had never been told that he could not do something by Marvel or Sony, saying, "You assume you'll have to fight for every little weird thing you wanna do, but I didn't really ever run into that. I got to do kind of everything I wanted to." That month, Starr explained that he was playing the academic decathlon coach at Peter's high school, and Marshall-Green was said to be portraying another Shocker.

In July, Feige discussed specific moments in the film, including an homage to The Amazing Spider-Man vol. 1 issue 33 (1966) where Peter is trapped underneath rubble, something Feige "wanted to see in a movie for a long, long time". Daley said that they added the scene to the script because of how much Feige wanted it, and explained, "We have [Peter] starting the scene with such self-doubt and helplessness, in a way that you really see the kid. You feel for him. He's screaming for help, because he doesn't think he can do it, and then ... he kind of realizes that that's been his biggest problem." Feige compared the film's final scene, where Peter accidentally reveals that he is Spider-Man to his Aunt May, to the ending of the first MCU film Iron Man (2008) when Stark reveals that he is Iron Man to the world, saying, "What does that mean for the next movie? I don't know, but it will force us to do something unique." Goldstein added that it "diminishes what is often the most trivial part of superhero worlds, which is finding your secret. It takes the emphasis off that [and] lets her become part of what's really his life." Feige also talked about the film's revelation that the Vulture is the father of Peter's love interest, feeling that if it did not work, the film would not work. The team "worked backwards and forwards from that moment ... You had to believe that we had set it up so that you would buy it [and it] doesn't seem like something out of left field". Watts said the revelation scene and the following interactions between the Vulture and Peter were, "more than anything else, [what] I was looking forward to, and I got to have a lot of fun shooting that stuff". Goldstein said the scene after the reveal, where Vulture realizes that Peter is Spider-Man while driving him to the school dance, was the moment he was most proud of in the film, and Daley said that scene's effect on audiences was the dramatic equivalent of an audience laughing at a joke they had written. He added that the writers were "giddy when we first came up with [that twist], because it's taking the obvious tension of meeting the father of the girl that you have a crush on, and multiplying it by 1,000, when you also realize he's the guy you've been trying to stop the whole time".

==== Visual effects ====
External videos
- Marvel Studios's Spider-Man: Homecoming End Credits Final Main on End Title Sequence presents the film's main-on-end title sequence, YouTube video from Perception's channel

Visual effects for the film were completed by Sony Pictures Imageworks, Industrial Light & Magic, Luma Pictures, Digital Domain, Cantina Creative, Iloura, Trixter, and Method Studios. Executive producer Victoria Alonso initially did not want Imageworks, which worked on all previous Spider-Man films, to work on Homecoming, in order to give it a different look than those earlier films. She changed her mind after seeing what she called "phenomenal" test material from the vendor. The film's main-on-end title sequence was designed by Perception.

Trixter used a LIDAR scan of Grand Central Terminal from The Avengers to help create their CGI version (bottom), adding to the elements filmed on set (top).

Trixter contributed over 300 shots for the film, including the opening scene at Grand Central Terminal, the sequence that retells the events of Civil War from Peter's perspective, the sequence where Toomes takes Liz and Peter to the dance, the school battle between Peter and Schultz, and the scene around and within the Avengers compound. They also worked on both Spider-Man suits and the spider tracer. Trixter created additional salvage workers to populate the Grand Central scene, whose clothes and proportions were able to be altered to create variation. For the battle between Peter and Schultz, Trixter used an all-digital Spider-Man in his homemade suit, which came from Imageworks, with Trixter applying a rigging, muscle, and cloth system to it "to mimic the appearance of the rather loose training suit". They also created the effects for Schultz's gauntlets and had to change the setting from the Atlanta set to Queens, by using a CGI school and adding 360 degrees of matte paintings for the mid to far-distance elements. Trixter received concept art and basic geometry that was used previously for the Avengers compound, but ended up remodeling it for the way it appears in Homecoming. Models and textures for Spider-Man's Avengers costume were created by Framestore for use in a future MCU film, with Trixter creating the vault that it appears in. Trixter VFX supervisor Dominik Zimmerle said the idea was "to have a clean, high tech, presentation Vault for the new suit. It should appear distinctively 'Stark' originated".

Digital Domain worked on the Staten Island Ferry battle, creating the CGI versions of Spider-Man, the Vulture suit, Iron Man, and Spider-Man's drone. Digital Domain was able to LIDAR an actual Staten Island Ferry, as well as the version created on set, to help with creating their digital version. Lou Pecora, visual effects supervisor at Digital Domain, called that sequence "brutal" because "the way they were shot, it was lit to be a certain time of day, and afterwards it was decided to change that time of day". Sony Pictures Imageworks created much of the third act of the film when Peter confronts Toomes on the plane and beach in his homemade suit, and Toomes is in an upgraded Vulture suit. Some elements of Vulture's first suit were shared with Imageworks, but the remainder were created by them "based on a maquette". For the plane's cloaking ability, Imageworks was inspired by Adaptiv IR Camouflage tank cloaking system by BAE Systems, which "uses a series of titles to cloak against infrared". For their web design, which was based on the one created for Civil War, Digital Domain referenced polar bear hair because of its translucent nature. Imageworks also looked to the Civil War webs, as well as to those they had created for previous Spider-Man films, in which "the web[s] had [...] tiny barbs that aided in hooking on to things". For this film, they "dialed back the barbs" to line up more closely with the other web designs created for this film. Method Studios worked on the Washington Monument sequence. Iron Man's armor in the film, the Mark XLVII, is a recolored version of the MK XLVI armor introduced in Civil War; this was done because Sony did not have the budget to create a new Iron Man suit. Feige requested the color scheme resemble the Ultimate Iron Man armor from the comics.

== Music ==
While promoting Doctor Strange in early November 2016, Feige accidentally revealed that Michael Giacchino, who composed the music for that film, would compose the score for Homecoming as well. Giacchino soon confirmed this himself. Recording for the soundtrack began on April 11, 2017. The score includes the theme from the 1960s animated series. The soundtrack was released by Sony Masterworks on July 7, 2017.

== Marketing ==
Watts, Holland, Batalon, Harrier, Revolori, and Zendaya appeared at the 2016 San Diego Comic-Con to show an exclusive clip of the film, which also had a panel at Comic Con Experience 2016. The first trailer for Homecoming premiered on Jimmy Kimmel Live! on December 8, 2016, and was released online alongside an international version, which Feige thought was different enough that "it would be fun for people to see both." The shots of Vulture descending through a hotel atrium and Spider-Man swinging with Iron Man flying beside him were created specifically for the trailer. Watts explained that the Vulture shot was created for Comic-Con and "was never meant to be in the movie", but he was able to repurpose the angle for Vulture's reveal in the film. The Spider-Man and Iron Man shot was created because the marketing team wanted a shot of the two together, and existing shots "just didn't look that great" then. The trailer shot used a background plate taken when filming the subway in Queens. The two trailers were viewed over 266 million times globally within a week.

On March 28, 2017, a second trailer debuted after screening at CinemaCon 2017 the night before. Shawn Robbins, chief analyst at BoxOffice.com, noted that the new Justice League trailer had received more Twitter mentions in that week but there was "clearer enthusiasm for Spider-Man". The Homecoming trailer was second for the week of March 20–26 in new conversations (85,859) behind Justice League (201,267), according to comScore's PreAct service, which is "a tracking service utilizing social data to create context of the ever-evolving role of digital communication on feature films". An exclusive clip from the film was seen during the 2017 MTV Movie & TV Awards. On May 24, Sony and Marvel released a third domestic and international trailer. Ethan Anderton of /Film enjoyed both trailers, stating Homecoming "has the potential to be the best Spider-Man movie yet. Having the webslinger as part of the Marvel Cinematic Universe just feels right". TechCrunch's Darrell Etherington agreed, saying, "You may have feelings about a tech-heavy Spider-Man suit or other aspects of this interpretation of the character, but it's still shaping up to be better than any Spider-Man depicted in movies in recent memory." Ana Dumaraog for Screen Rant said the second trailer "arguably showed too much of the movie's overarching narrative", but the third "perfectly shows the right amount of new and old footage". She also appreciated the attention to detail that Watts and the writers put into the film, as highlighted by the trailers. Siddhant Adlakha of Birth.Movies.Death also felt the trailers were giving away too many details, but enjoyed them overall, especially the "vlogging" aspect. Collider's Dave Trombore expressed similar sentiments to Adlakha. After the release of the trailers, comScore and its PreAct service noted Homecoming was the top film for new social media conversations, that week and the week of May 29.

Alongside the release of the third trailers were domestic and international release posters. The domestic poster was criticized for its "floating head" style, which offers "a chaotic mess of people looking in different directions, with little sense of what the film will deliver". Dan Auty for GameSpot called it a "star studded hot mess", while Vanity Fair's Katey Rich felt the poster was "too bogged down by the many different threads of the Marvel universe to highlight anything that's made Spider-Man: Homecoming seem special so far". Adlakha felt the posters released for the film "have been alright thus far, but these ones probably tell general audiences to expect a very bloated movie". Adlakha was more positive of the international poster, which he felt was more "comicbook-y" and "looks like it could be an actual scene from the film". Both Rich and Adlakha criticized the fact that Holland, Keaton, and Downey appeared twice on the domestic poster, both in and out of costume. Sony partnered with ESPN CreativeWorks to create cross-promotional television ads for Homecoming and the 2017 NBA Finals, which were filmed by Watts. The ads were made to "weave in a highlight from the game just moments" after it occurred. The promos see Holland, Downey Jr., and Favreau reprise their roles from the film, with cameo appearances from Stan Lee, DJ Khaled, Tim Duncan, Magic Johnson, and Cari Champion. Through June and July 2017, a Homecoming-inspired cafe opened in the Roppongi Hills complex in Tokyo, offering "arachnid-themed foods and drinks, including a Spider Curry, Spider-Sense Latte and a sweet and refreshing Strawberry Spider Squash drink", as well as a free, limited-edition sticker with any purchase.

For the week ending on June 11, comScore and its PreAct service noted that new social media conversations for the film were second only to Black Panther and its new trailer; Homecoming was then the number one film in the next two weeks. That month, Sony released a mobile app allowing users to "access" Peter's phone and "view his photos, videos, text messages, and hear voicemails from his friends". The app also provided an "AR Suit Explorer" to learn more about the technology in the Spider-Man suit, and use photo filters, GIFs, and stickers of the character. Sony and Dave & Buster's also announced an arcade game based on the film, playable exclusively at Dave & Buster's locations. A tie-in comic, Spider-Man: Homecoming Prelude, was released on June 20, collecting two prelude issues. On June 28, in partnership with Thinkmodo, a promotional prank was released in which Spider-Man (stuntman Chris Silcox) dropped from the ceiling in a coffee shop to scare customers; the video also featured a cameo appearance from Lee. Sony also partnered with the mobile app Holo to let users add 3D holograms of Spider-Man, with Holland's voice and lines from the film, to real-world photos and videos. Before the end of June, Spider-Man: Homecoming—Virtual Reality Experience was released on the PlayStation VR, Oculus Rift, and HTC Vive for free, produced by Sony Pictures VR and developed by CreateVR. It allows users to experience how it feels to be Spider-Man, with the ability to hit targets with his web-shooters and face off against the Vulture. It was also available at select Cinemark Theatres in the United States and at the CineEurope trade show in Barcelona.

Ahead of the film's release, for the week ending on July 2, the film was the top film for the third consecutive week for new social media conversations, according to comScore, which also noted that Spider-Man: Homecoming had produced a total of 2.67 million conversations to date. Other promotions included Audi and Dell (both also had product placement in the film), Pizza Hut, General Mills, Synchrony Bank, MovieTickets.com, Goodwill, Baskin-Robbins, Dunkin' Donuts, Danone Waters, Panasonic Batteries, M&M's, Mondelez, Asus, Bimbo, Jetstar, KEF, Kellogg's, Lieferheld, PepsiCo, Plus, Roady, Snickers, Sony Mobile, Oppo, Optus, and Doritos. Watts directed a commercial for Dell's marketing efforts as well, which earned 2.8 million views online. Goodwill hosted a build-your-own Spider-Man suit contest, with the winner attending the film's premiere. Overall, the campaign generated over $140 million in media value, greater than those for all previous Spider-Man films and Marvel Studios's first 2017 release, Guardians of the Galaxy Vol. 2. This does not include merchandising for the film, which is controlled by Marvel and Disney. Marketing of the film in China included partnering with Momo, iQiyi, Tencent QQ, Baidu, Mizone, CapitaLand, Xiaomi, HTC, and corporate parent Sony. To help target the teenage audience, Holland "recorded a high school entrance exam greeting" while The Rap of China contestant PG One recorded a theme song.

== Release ==
=== Theatrical ===
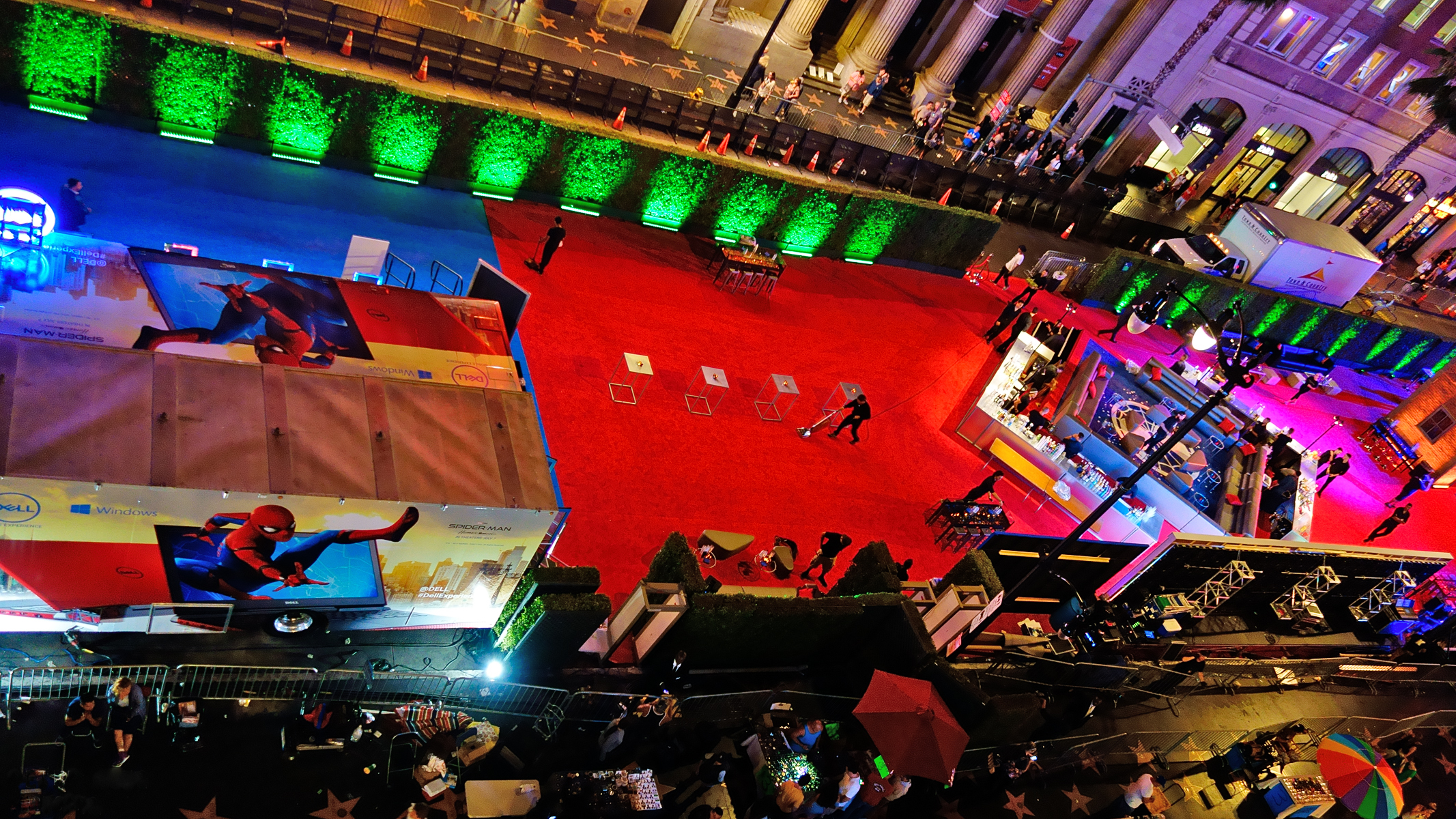
The world premiere of Spider-Man: Homecoming at TCL Chinese Theatre

Spider-Man: Homecoming held its world premiere at the TCL Chinese Theatre in Hollywood, Los Angeles, on June 28, 2017, and was released in the United Kingdom on July 5. It opened in additional international markets on July 6, with 23,400 screens (277 of which were IMAX) in 56 markets for its opening weekend. The film was released in the United States on July 7, in 4,348 theaters (392 were IMAX and IMAX 3D, and 601 were premium large-format), including 3D screenings. It was originally slated for release on July 28. Spider-Man: Homecoming is part of Phase Three of the MCU.

In March 2024, Sony announced that all of their live-action Spider-Man films would be re-released in theaters as part of Columbia Pictures's 100th anniversary celebration. Spider-Man: Homecoming was re-released on May 20, 2024.

=== Home media ===
Spider-Man: Homecoming was released on digital download by Sony Pictures Home Entertainment on September 26, 2017, and on Blu-ray, Blu-ray 3D, Ultra HD Blu-ray, and DVD on October 17, 2017. The digital and Blu-ray releases include behind-the-scenes featurettes, deleted scenes, and a blooper reel. The physical releases in its first week of sale were the top home media release, according to NPD VideoScan data. The Blu-ray version accounted for 79% of the sales, with 13% of total sales coming from the Ultra HD Blu-ray version.

In April 2021, Sony signed a deal with Disney giving them access to their legacy content, including past Spider-Man films and Marvel content in Sony's Spider-Man Universe, to stream on Disney+ and Hulu and appear on Disney's linear television networks. Disney's access to Sony's titles would come following their availability on Netflix. Homecoming had previously been available on Starz and FX. The film became available on Disney+ in the United Kingdom and Australia on June 17, 2022, and became available in the United States on May 12, 2023.

== Reception ==
=== Box office ===
Spider-Man: Homecoming grossed $334.9 million in the United States and Canada, and $546 million in other territories, for a worldwide total of $880.9 million. The film had the second-biggest global IMAX opening for a Sony film with $18 million. In May 2017, a survey from Fandango indicated that Homecoming was the second-most-anticipated summer blockbuster behind Wonder Woman. By September 24, 2017, the film had earned $874.4 million worldwide, becoming the highest-grossing superhero film of 2017, and the sixth-largest film based on a Marvel character. Deadline Hollywood calculated the film's net profit as $200.1 million, accounting for production budgets, marketing, talent participations, and other costs; box office grosses and home media revenues placed it seventh on their list of 2017's "Most Valuable Blockbusters".

The film earned $50.9 million on its opening day in the United States and Canada (including $15.4 million from Thursday night previews), and had a total weekend gross of $117 million, the top film for the weekend. It was the second-highest opening for both a Spider-Man film and a Sony film, after Spider-Man 3's $151.1 million debut in 2007. Early projections for the film from BoxOffice had it earning $135 million in its opening weekend, which was later adjusted to $125 million, and Deadline Hollywood noting industry projections at anywhere between $90–120 million. In its second weekend, the film fell to second behind War for the Planet of the Apes with $44.2 million, a 62% decline in earnings, which was similar to the declines The Amazing Spider-Man 2 and Spider-Man 3 had in their second weekends. Additionally, Homecoming's domestic gross reached $208.3 million, which surpassed the total domestic gross of The Amazing Spider-Man 2 ($202.9 million). The film fell to third in its third weekend. By July 26, Homecoming's domestic gross reached $262.1 million, surpassing the total domestic gross of The Amazing Spider-Man ($262 million), leading to a fifth-place finish for its fourth weekend. The next weekend, Homecoming finished sixth, and finished seventh the following five weekends. By September 3, 2017, the film had earned $325.1 million, surpassing the $325 million projected amount for its total domestic gross. In its eleventh weekend, Homecoming finished ninth.

Outside of the United States and Canada, Spider-Man: Homecoming earned $140.5 million its opening weekend from the 56 markets it opened in, with the film becoming number one in 50 of them. The $140.5 million was the highest opening ever for a Spider-Man film. South Korea had the highest Wednesday opening day gross, which contributed to a $25.4 million five-day opening in the country, the third-highest opening ever for a Hollywood film. Brazil had the largest July opening day of all time, with $2 million, leading to an opening weekend total of $8.9 million. The $7 million earned from IMAX showings was the top opening of all time for a Sony film internationally. In its second weekend, the film opened in France at number one and number two in Germany. It earned an additional $11.9 million in South Korea, to bring its total in the country to $42.2 million. This made Homecoming the highest-grossing Spider-Man film and the top-grossing Hollywood film of 2017 in the country. Brazil contributed an additional $5.7 million, for a total of $19.4 million from the country, which was also the largest gross from a Spider-Man film. The film's third weekend saw the Latin America region set a record as the highest-grossing Spider-Man film of all time, with a region total of $77.4 million. Brazil remained the top-grossing market for the region, with $25.7 million. In South Korea, the film became the 10th-highest-grossing international release of all time. Homecoming opened at number one in Spain in its fourth weekend. In its sixth weekend, the film opened at number one in Japan, with its $770,000 from IMAX the fourth-largest IMAX weekend for a Marvel film in the country. The film opened at number one in China on September 8, 2017, grossing $23 million on its opening day, including Thursday previews, making it the third biggest opening day for a Marvel Cinematic Universe film, behind Avengers: Age of Ultron and Captain America: Civil War, and the largest opening day gross for a Sony film in the country. The $70.8 million Homecoming earned in China for its opening weekend was the third-highest opening behind Age of Ultron and Civil War, with $6 million from IMAX, which was the best IMAX opening weekend in September, and the best IMAX opening weekend for a Sony film. As of September 24, 2017, the film's largest markets were China ($115.7 million), South Korea ($51.4 million), and the United Kingdom ($34.8 million).

=== Critical response ===
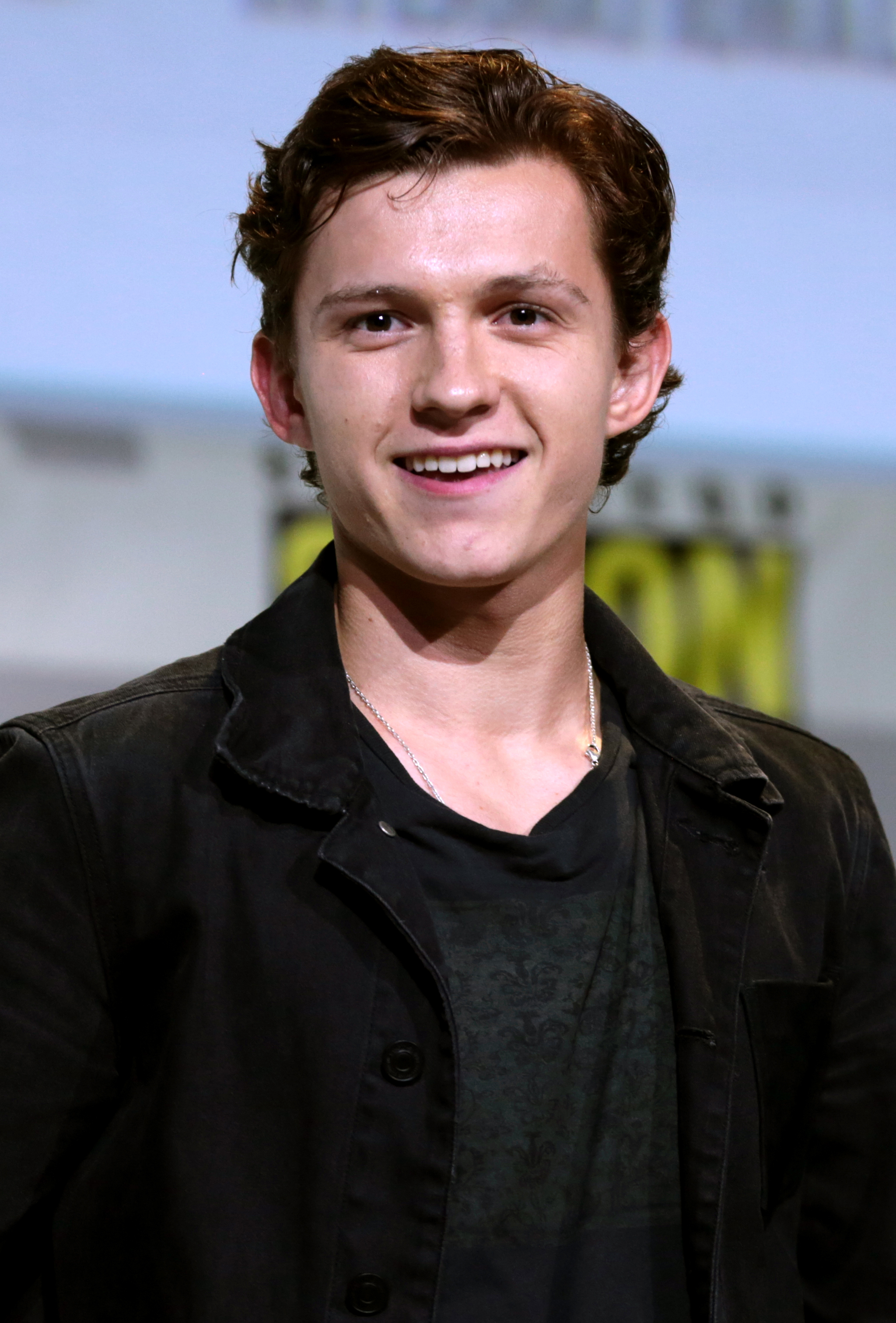
Tom Holland's performance as Spider-Man received praise.

The review aggregator Rotten Tomatoes reported an approval rating of 92%, with an average score of 7.7/10, based on 396 reviews. The website's critical consensus reads, "Spider-Man: Homecoming does whatever a second reboot can, delivering a colorful, fun adventure that fits snugly in the sprawling MCU without getting bogged down in franchise-building." Metacritic, which uses a weighted average, assigned the film a score of 73 out of 100, based on 51 critics, indicating "generally favorable" reviews. Audiences polled by CinemaScore gave the film an average grade of "A" on an A+ to F scale, while PostTrak reported filmgoers gave it an 89% overall positive score and a 74% "definite recommend".

Mike Ryan at Uproxx felt Homecoming was the best Spider-Man film yet, specifically praising the light tone, younger and more optimistic portrayal of Peter, and Keaton's performance—Ryan named the Vulture twist reveal as one of his favorite scenes in the MCU. He said Homecoming is "the kind of movie you leave and you're just in the best mood—and still will be days later." Richard Roeper of the Chicago Sun-Times called the film unique and refreshing, praising its lower stakes and focus on the character's school life. He praised Holland as "terrific and well-cast", as well as the other cast members; Roeper believed that Keaton's performance is more interesting than the character otherwise could have been. Owen Gleiberman of Variety felt the film was "just distinctive enough" from the previous Spider-Man films to become a "sizable hit", and highlighted its focus on making Peter Parker a realistically youthful and grounded character. He found Holland to be likable in the role and thought the Vulture twist was a positive direction for that character. He did criticize the vague take on Spider-Man's origin and powers, but "the flying action has a casual flip buoyancy, and the movie does get you rooting for Peter." At IndieWire, David Ehrlich criticized the film's superhero genre clichés and underwritten female characters, but praised the elements of the film that leaned into Peter's high school life and the humanity of the Vulture.

Kenneth Turan of the Los Angeles Times gave the film a mixed review, criticizing the "juvenile" depiction of Peter and Watts's "unevenly orchestrated" direction, but feeling that the film "finds its pace and rhythm by the end" and praising Keaton's performance. The Hollywood Reporter's John DeFore found the film to be "occasionally exciting but often frustrating", and suggested it might have worked better if less focus had been put on integrating the film with the MCU. DeFore did praise Holland's performance as "winning" despite the script and called Zendaya a scene-stealer. Mick LaSalle, writing for the San Francisco Chronicle, said the film was a "pretty good Spider-Man movie" that "breaks no new ground", not exploring the human side of the character enough and instead focusing on action that is not thrilling. At The Telegraph, Robbie Collin argued that "a little of the new Spider-Man went an exhilaratingly long way in Captain America: Civil War last year. But a lot of him goes almost nowhere in this slack and spiritless solo escapade." Collin criticized Watts's direction but was positive of the cast, including Holland, Keaton, Tomei, and Zendaya.

=== Accolades ===
Year	Award	Category	Recipient	Result	Refs
2017	Teen Choice Awards	Choice Breakout Movie Star	Tom Holland	Nominated	
2017	Teen Choice Awards	Choice Breakout Movie Star	Zendaya	Nominated	
2017	Teen Choice Awards	Choice Summer Movie	Spider-Man: Homecoming	Won	
2017	Teen Choice Awards	Choice Summer Movie Actor	Tom Holland	Won	
2017	Teen Choice Awards	Choice Summer Movie Actress	Zendaya	Won	
2017	Washington D.C. Film Critics Awards	The Joe Barber Award for Best Portrayal of Washington, D.C.	Spider-Man: Homecoming	Nominated	
2018	Kids' Choice Awards	Favorite Movie	Spider-Man: Homecoming	Nominated	
2018	Kids' Choice Awards	Favorite Movie Actress	Zendaya (Note: Also for The Greatest Showman (2017))	Won	
2018	Saturn Awards	Best Comic-to-Motion Picture Release	Spider-Man: Homecoming	Nominated	
2018	Saturn Awards	Best Supporting Actor in a Film	Michael Keaton	Nominated	
2018	Saturn Awards	Best Performance by a Younger Actor in a Film	Tom Holland	Won	
2018	Saturn Awards	Best Performance by a Younger Actor in a Film	Zendaya	Nominated	

== Sequels ==
A sequel, Spider-Man: Far From Home, was released on July 2, 2019. Watts returned to direct, from a script by McKenna and Sommers. Holland, Favreau, Zendaya, Tomei, and Batalon reprise their roles, with Jake Gyllenhaal joining as Mysterio. Samuel L. Jackson and Cobie Smulders also reprised their roles as Nick Fury and Maria Hill, respectively, from previous MCU media.

A third film was announced by Marvel Studios and Sony Pictures in September 2019, after an impasse between the two companies was resolved during negotiations. Watts returned to direct, from a script by McKenna and Sommers. Holland, Zendaya, Favreau, Tomei, Batalon, and Revolori reprise their roles, while Benedict Cumberbatch and Benedict Wong reprise their MCU roles as Doctor Strange and Wong. Actors reprising their roles from previous Spider-Man films include Tobey Maguire and Andrew Garfield returning as their versions of Spider-Man from Sam Raimi's Spider-Man trilogy and Marc Webb's The Amazing Spider-Man films, respectively, alongside Willem Dafoe as Norman Osborn / Green Goblin, Alfred Molina as Otto Octavius / Doctor Octopus, and Thomas Haden Church as Flint Marko / Sandman from Raimi's Spider-Man trilogy, along with Rhys Ifans as Curt Connors / Lizard and Jamie Foxx as Max Dillon / Electro from Webb's The Amazing Spider-Man films. Spider-Man: No Way Home was released on December 17, 2021.

In November 2021, Pascal revealed that Sony and Marvel Studios were planning on making at least three more Spider-Man films starring Holland, beginning with Spider-Man: Brand New Day (2026).

== See also ==
- Your Friendly Neighborhood Spider-Man, an animated series set in an alternate timeline where Norman Osborn becomes Peter's mentor instead of Tony Stark
