= Erica Sweany =

American actress and multidisciplinary artist

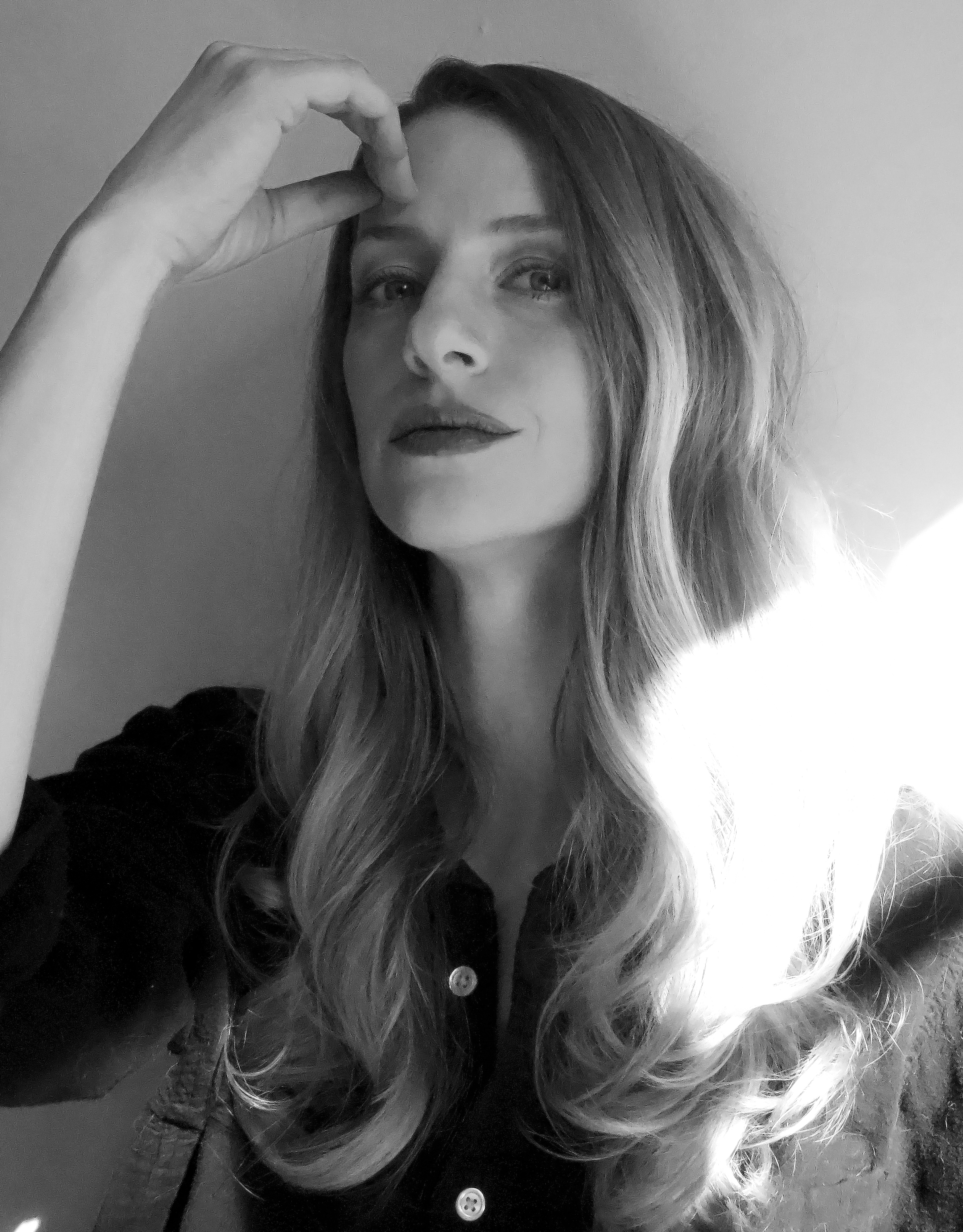
Erica Sweany in 2021

Erica Sweany is an American actress, dancer, singer and multi-instrumentalist. She has performed on Broadway, in film and on television.

== Biography ==
Born and raised in Colorado, she is a graduate of the University of Northern Colorado (UNC).

== Career ==
In 2013 Erica participated in a spoof on The Sound of Music with David Letterman during his opening monologue during two separate episodes of The Late Show.

In 2014 Sweany made her Broadway debut in the original Broadway cast of Honeymoon in Vegas by Jason Robert Brown. Later that year she made her network television debut as Elise Paschen in The Blacklist starring James Spader.

In 2015 she guest starred as Julia Becker on the TV series Eye Candy starring Victoria Justice.

In 2016 she portrayed Anna in It Had to Be You starring Cristin Milioti. She also guest-starred on Lifetime Movie Network's I Love You... But I Lied.

In 2017 she joined the Broadway cast of M. Butterfly by David Henry Hwang starring Clive Owen and directed by Julie Taymor as an understudy. Shortly before the show closed on Broadway she played the wife of Mr. Owen, when a cast member was ill. Also in 2017, Sweany played Kate Tompkins on Law & Order: SVU.

Erica joined the cast for the second year of Harry Potter and the Cursed Child on Broadway as an ensemble member, aerialist and understudy. Later in 2018 the feature film, How the Light Gets In starring Erica and writer Jude Severin was released, as well as Rockstar Games' Red Dead Redemption 2 where Erica played Mrs. Londonderry.

In 2019 Erica played a featured role in Motherless Brooklyn, written, directed and starring Edward Norton.

In 2021 Sweany played Rachel Dunn in FBI: Most Wanted. That same year she danced in the film White Noise by Noah Baumbach, which was choreographed by her husband, David Neumann.

In 2022 Sweany returned to Harry Potter and the Cursed Child to play the role of Ginny Potter.

Erica was featured in the film Birth/Rebirth by Laura Moss, starring Marin Ireland, as the opening midnight film at Sundance in 2023. She then appeared as Florence in Amazon Prime's Dead Ringers starring Rachel Weisz.

In addition to the performing arts Erica has worked in costume and production design, ceramics, photography and iOS app development.

She is married to choreographer David Neumann.

== Filmography ==
=== Film ===
Year	Title	Role	Notes
2003	The Maze	Gum Girl	Short
2009	The Flying Scissors	Russian Bride #2	
2010	Awake	Christine Schmidt	Short
2011	Meanwhile	Accident Passer-by	
2013	Casual Encounters	Betty	
2014	Space Dogs	Olga	Short
2015	It Had to Be You	Anna	
2016	Pat + Penelope	Assistant	Short
2018	40th	Mom	Short
2018	How the Light Gets In	Zoey	
2019	Motherless Brooklyn	Formosa Hostess	
2022	White Noise	Key Dance Ensemble	
2023	Birth/Rebirth	Ultrasound Tech	
2023	Kidnapping Oscar Isaac	Eve	Short
2024	Scattered	Friend	Short
2025	Jay Kelly	Costume Designer	
2025	The Life Project	Erica	Short

=== Television ===
Year	Title	Role	Notes
2012-13	Late Show with David Letterman	Various Roles	Guest Cast: Season 19-21
2014	The Blacklist	Elise Paschen	Episode: "Mako Tanida (No. 83)"
2014	24x24	Herself	Main Cast
2015	Eye Candy	Julia Becker	Recurring Cast
2015-17	Labeled	Carly	Main Cast
2016	I Love You... But I Lied	Eve	Episode: "Engaged"
2017	Law & Order: Special Victims Unit	Kate Tompkins	Episode: "Net Worth"
2021	FBI: Most Wanted	Rachel Dunn	Episode: "Unhinged"
2023	Dead Ringers	Florence	Episode: "Five"
2024	Law & Order	Sarah Heartwood	Episode: "The Meaning of Life"
2025	FBI	Cassie Galloway	Episode: "Boy Scout"

=== Video Game ===
Year	Title	Role	Notes
2018	Red Dead Redemption 2	Mrs. Londonderry (voice)	
