= Alethea Jones =

Australian director

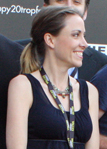
- Jones at Tropfest 2012 in Sydney, Australia
- Occupations: Film director, producer, screenwriter
- Known for: Lemonade Stand (2012); Fun Mom Dinner (2017)

Alethea Jones is an Australian film and television director, best known for her films Lemonade Stand (2012), Fun Mom Dinner (2017), and the TV series Queen America.

== Career ==
Jones's first short film, When the Wind Changes (which she directed and edited), premiered at the 2010 Melbourne International Film Festival. In 2011 it won the Inside Film (IF) Award for Best Short Film, the Most Popular Film Award at Flickerfest, and the Best Comedy and People's Choice awards at the St Kilda Film Festival.

She gained wider recognition with the short film Lemonade Stand, which won first prize at the 2012 Tropfest Film Festival.

Her first feature film was Fun Mom Dinner, starring Toni Collette, Paul Rudd, Molly Shannon, Adam Scott, and Adam Levine. The film premiered at the 2017 Sundance Film Festival.

In August 2017, it was announced that Jones would direct a planned live-action Barbie film, starring Anne Hathaway, from a script by Olivia Milch and produced by Sony Pictures. In October 2018, Sony lost the rights and the project moved to Warner Bros. with Margot Robbie to star. Jones, Hathaway and Milch did not continue with the production after the studio change.

In October 2022, Jones was announced as an executive producer and episode director of Grease: Rise of the Pink Ladies for the streaming service Paramount+.

== Awards ==
- 2011 - When the Wind Changes - Best Short Film, Inside Film (IF) Awards
- 2012 - Lemonade Stand - First Prize, Tropfest Short Film Festival
- 2017 - Breakthrough Award (joint winner), Australians in Film

== Personal life ==
Jones grew up in Northern New South Wales, Australia, and graduated from the Victorian College of the Arts in 2007. She currently resides in Los Angeles with her husband, Emmy-award nominated sound designer PK Hooker.

== Filmography ==
Short film

- When the Wind Changes (2010)
- Lemonade Stand (2012)

Feature film

- Fun Mom Dinner (2017)

Television

Year	Title	Director	Executive Producer	Notes
2011	Cop Hard	Yes	No	5 episodes
2013	The Elegant Gentleman's Guide to Knife Fighting	Yes	No	3 episodes
2015	A History of Radness	Yes	No	TV movie
2018	Wrecked	Yes	No	2 episodes
2018	American Woman	Yes	No	1 episode
2018–2019	Queen America	Yes	No	10 episodes
2019–2022	Dollface	Yes	No	4 episodes
2019	Lodge 49	Yes	No	2 episodes
2020	Dispatches from Elsewhere	Yes	No	1 episode
2021	Made for Love	Yes	No	2 episodes
2021	Evil	Yes	No	2 episodes
2022	Shining Vale	Yes	No	3 episodes
2023	Grease: Rise of the Pink Ladies	Yes	Yes	3 episodes
2023	Mrs. Davis	Yes	Yes	3 episodes
2024–2026	High Potential	Yes	Yes	3 episodes
2025	Peacemaker	Yes	No	2 episodes
2026	56 Days	Yes	Yes	2 episodes
2026	M.I.A.	Yes	Yes	2 episodes
2026	Spider-Noir	Yes	No	2 episodes
