= Queen America =

American web television series

- Genre: Drama
- Created by: Meaghan Oppenheimer
- Directed by: Alethea Jones
- Starring: Catherine Zeta-Jones; Belle Shouse; Teagle F. Bougere; Rana Roy; Isabella Amara; Molly Price; Megan West
- Composers: Shel Dailey; Kevin Dailey
- Country of origin: United States
- Original language: English
- No. of seasons: 1
- No. of episodes: 10

Production
- Executive producers: Guymon Casady; Suzan Bymel; Alethea Jones; Casey Haver; Steve Hutensky; Janice Williams; Paul Lee; Bruna Papandrea; Meaghan Oppenheimer
- Producers: Gretchen Enders; Jaclyn Moore; Darren Demetre
- Cinematography: Ross Riege
- Editors: Fabienne Bouville; Peter Cabadahagan; L.B. Brodie
- Running time: 23–35 minutes
- Production companies: wiip; Made Up Stories; Moppy Productions; Entertainment 360

Original release
- Network: Facebook Watch
- Release: November 18, 2018 – January 6, 2019

Queen America is an American drama online series that aired from November 18, 2018 to January 6, 2019 on Facebook Watch. It stars Catherine Zeta-Jones, Belle Shouse, Teagle F. Bougere, Rana Roy, Molly Price, Isabella Amara and Megan West. The series follows a beauty pageant coach who suddenly finds herself backed into the position of training an untested contestant.

== Premise ==
Queen America is set in Tulsa, Oklahoma, and follows "Vicki Ellis, the most renowned (and ruthless) pageant coach in the state, and the hapless Samantha Cole who hopes Vicki can mold her into worthwhile contender for the title of Miss America. Vicki is desperately sought after by young women competing to be Miss America for one reason; she can turn any girl into a winner. But when she gets paired with the beautiful but unpolished Samantha, Vicki’s entire reputation might be at stake."

== Cast and characters ==
=== Main ===
- Catherine Zeta Jones as Vicki Ellis, a beauty pageant coach from Oklahoma who has worked with every winner of the Miss Oklahoma Starred and Striped U.S. Beauty Pageant for many years
- Belle Shouse as Samantha Cole, the current beauty pageant titleholder of Miss Oklahoma Starred and Striped U.S. and Vicki's client. She was crowned after initially coming in second place but was given the title after the original winner was dethroned.
- Teagle F. Bougere as Nigel Hill, a hair and make-up artist who works for Vicki
- Rana Roy as Mary Clark, a personal trainer who works for Vicki
- Molly Price as Katie Ellis, Vicki's sister and Bella's mother. Formerly a receptionist at a car dealership, she now works as a house cleaner.
- Isabella Amara as Bella Ellis, Vicki's niece and Katie's daughter
- Megan West as Brittany Garrett, the current beauty pageant titleholder of Miss Texas Starred and Striped U.S. and Mandy's client

=== Recurring ===
- Tom Ellis as Andy, a chef and single father whom Vicki is dating
- Judith Light as Regina Parrot, Vicki's mentor and former pageant coach who reluctantly agrees to help her coach Samantha
- Alexander England as Rick Bishop, a member of the board of the Miss Oklahoma Starred and Striped U.S. Beauty Pageant with a history of harassing women
- Robert Pralgo as Bruce James, the father of an aspiring pageant contestant who is having an affair with Nigel. He is secretly a closeted gay man and married to a woman.
- Robb Derringer as Robert Crowe, an old boyfriend of Vicki's
- Charmin Lee as Nancy Summer, the president of the board of the Miss Oklahoma Starred and Striped U.S. Beauty Pageant
- Mickey Cole Jr. as Michael, an employee of Señorita's Tacos who begins dating Bella. They stop seeing each other after he learns that she is in fact sixteen years old and in high school and not twenty years old and in college as she had originally told him.
- Jennifer Westfeldt as Mandy Green, a beauty pageant coach from Texas and Vick's nemesis
- Victoria Justice as Hayley Wilson, a client of Vicki's and the initial winner of the Miss Oklahoma Starred and Striped U.S. Beauty Pageant. She was dethroned after crashing a car through a restaurant and getting charged with a DUI.
- Cory Chapman as Kevin Cole, Samantha's brother
- Jayson Warner Smith as Mr. Cole, Samantha's father
- Kat Hughes as Deb Bonilla, a friend of Samantha's in Claremore
- Jared Wofford as Parker, a man whom Nigel sleeps with
- Lucy Capri as Grace, Andy's daughter whom Vicki babysits as a favor
- Meg Gillentine as Marcia Woodhouse, a boutique owner and friend of Regina whom Vicki knows and has purchased clothing from. Katie asks Vicki to refer her to Marcia for a housekeeping position after losing her job.
- Sir Brodie as Pastor Collin, the pastor of a church that Vicki attends and where Regina's funeral is held

=== Guest ===
- Kelsey Griswold as Kelly Marsh ("Social Awareness"), a beauty pageant titleholder who was crowned Miss Oklahoma Starred and Striped U.S. 2014

== Episodes ==
No.	Title	Directed by	Written by	Original release date
1	"Sequins and Fritos"	Alethea Jones	Meaghan Oppenheimer	November 18, 2018
2	"Ms. Claremore"	Alethea Jones	Meaghan Oppenheimer	November 18, 2018
3	"Social Awareness"	Alethea Jones	Gretchen Enders	November 18, 2018
4	"Texas"	Alethea Jones	Meaghan Oppenheimer	November 25, 2018
5	"Psychological Warfare"	Alethea Jones	Jaclyn Moore	December 2, 2018
6	"Juvenile Diabetes"	Alethea Jones	Liz Elverenli	December 9, 2018
7	"The National Anthem"	Alethea Jones	Gretchen Enders	December 16, 2018
8	"Help Me, I'm Sick"	Alethea Jones	Liz Elverenli	December 23, 2018
9	"Americana"	Alethea Jones	Jaclyn Moore	December 30, 2018
10	"Promises, Promises"	Alethea Jones	Meaghan Oppenheimer	January 6, 2019

== Production ==
=== Development ===
On May 3, 2018, it was announced that Facebook Watch had given the production a series order for a first season consisting of ten episodes. The series was created by Meaghan Oppenheimer who is set to executive produce alongside Paul Lee, Bruna Papandrea, Casey Haver, Guymon Casady, Suzan Bymel, and Janice Williams. Production companies involved with the series include wiip and Made Up Stories. On June 5, 2018, it was reported that Alethea Jones would direct all ten episodes of the series as well as serve as a co-executive producer alongside Steve Hutensky. On September 10, 2018, it was announced that the series would premiere on November 21, 2018, though it was later moved up to November 18.

=== Casting ===
Alongside the series order announcement, it was confirmed that Catherine Zeta Jones would star in the series. In July 2018, it was announced that Belle Shouse, Teagle F. Bougere, Rana Roy, Isabella Amara, Molly Price, and Megan West had been cast in main roles and that Jennifer Westfeldt, Victoria Justice, and Judith Light would appear in a recurring capacity.

=== Filming ===
Principal photography for the series reportedly began on June 18, 2018 and was set to last through late-August 2018 in Atlanta, Georgia. In late June, a scene was shot inside the Fry's Electronics store in Duluth, Georgia. From July 4 to 6, 2018, filming took place in Jonesboro, Georgia. On July 10, 2018, more filming occurred in the Perimeter Center area. On July 13, 18, and 19, 2018, filming took place in Buckhead near Lenox Square. On July 20, 2018, the series was in Midtown Atlanta, shooting at the Atlanta Biltmore Hotel and Biltmore Apartments. It was filming again in Midtown on July 23.

On August 7 to 10, 2018, filming again returned to the Perimeter Center area. On August 8, 2018, the production was filming in Lithonia and a week later in Conyers. On August 17, 2018, filming occurred in the Lindbergh neighborhood of Atlanta. On August 23, 2018, the production was shooting in Chamblee. From August 29 to 30, 2018, filming was scheduled to take place in Tulsa, Oklahoma.

== Release ==
=== Marketing ===
On September 10, 2018, a clip and a series of "first look" images from the series were released. On October 24, 2018, a teaser trailer for the series was released. On November 7, 2018, the official trailer for the series was released.

=== Premiere ===
On November 15, 2018, the series held its official premiere at Le Jardin in Los Angeles, California. Those in attendance included Victoria Justice, Belle Shouse, Rana Roy, Isabella Amara, Meaghan Oppenheimer, and Catherine Zeta-Jones.

== Reception ==
The series has been met with a mixed to positive critical response upon its premiere. On the review aggregation website Rotten Tomatoes, the series holds an approval rating of 67% with an average rating of 4 out of 10, based on 12 reviews. The website's critical consensus reads, "Not quite a showstopper, Queen America catwalks a tightrope between black comedy and straight drama but scores some points for Zeta-Jones' poised performance." Metacritic, which uses a weighted average, assigned the series a score of 54 out of 100 based on 4 critics, indicating "mixed or average reviews".

In a positive review, Boston Herald's Mark Perigard praised the series saying that it "features some surprisingly tense adult moments and some language that was bleeped out. Along the way, there are some cutting observations about the pageant scene — like how every winner has to act shocked, just shocked, when her name is called out." In a similarly positive assessment, Common Sense Media's Melissa Camacho was equally complimentary saying, "Despite the dark, snarky tone, Queen America also contains some mildly empowering themes, including the value of working hard, finding strength in oneself, and the importance of finding people to help pull you up when you need it. And while it has enough strong content to make it a questionable choice for young viewers, it is very entertaining for those mature enough to handle it. All in all, if you’re looking for a fun streaming series to watch, this one works." In a more mixed critique, Paste's LaToya Ferguson praised the performance of Zeta Jones saying, "She is the reason to continue watching, no matter how much you feel you’ve seen it before. The grace and command she possesses in every scene is truly a joy to watch," but ultimately concluded that "In the grand scheme, Queen America pales in comparison to its forerunners. That doesn’t mean it’s a waste of time, though. And who knows, maybe it has a few surprises up its sleeve down the road." In an outright negative editorial, Variety's Jen Chaney criticized the series saying, "In the series, a black comedy (or is it a drama with occasional jokes?) about the desperate hangers-on in the beauty pageant scene, Zeta-Jones feels constrained by the show’s sensibility and its sour lack of ambition. That she fights as hard as she can to avoid being sucked into the eddy of just-good-enough makes the mismatch between star and show, one of the most striking in recent memory, all the more pronounced."
