= It Had to Be You (2015 film) =

American romantic comedy

- Directed by: Sasha Gordon
- Screenplay by: Sasha Gordon
- Story by: Levi Abrino; Sasha Gordon
- Produced by: Richard Arlook; Benjamin Kruger; Levi Abrino; Sasha Gordon; Victor Magro
- Starring: Cristin Milioti; Dan Soder; Halley Feiffer
- Cinematography: Bobby Webster
- Edited by: Amanda Laws
- Music by: Sasha Gordon
- Release dates: October 2015 (Austin Film Festival); October 21, 2016
- Country: United States
- Language: English

It Had to Be You is a 2015 romantic comedy film starring Cristin Milioti, Dan Soder, and Halley Feiffer. Sonia (Milioti), a neurotic and charming jingle writer, is forced by her boyfriend Chris (Soder) to choose whether she wants to join the ranks of her married friends or live out her fantasies without him. Traditional gender stereotypes are reversed as she exhibits fear of commitment and he presses for marriage and starting a family. The film was Sasha Gordon's directorial debut, and premiered at the Austin Film Festival in October, 2015, with its theatrical release on October 21, 2016.

== Plot ==
Sonia Friedman, (Note: Sonia's family name is only shown on her website: "Sonia Friedman Music" but never mentioned.) a thirty-something young woman, panics when live-in boyfriend Chris Jensen (Note: Similarly, the website says "Site built by Chris Jensen" but is never otherwise mentioned.) proposes marriage. Her refusal hurts him and he walks out. Her friends Nora, Lee, and Anna arrive to console her, and in flashbacks we're told by Sonia's narration that Lee and Anna are married and that Nora is engaged to Mark. It's through Mark that Sonia met his friend Chris six months before the engagement. In another flashback we see Chris teaching Sonia to dance to the song It Had to Be You. Back in the present the next morning Chris explains they've been in a relationship for over a year, and even though she mocked the idea of marriage back then he thought the past year of seeing her friends married should have helped her change her mind. She apologizes and they agree that she can have some time to think about it.

Alone again, Sonia narrates an inner dialogue and through flashbacks and animation reveals three reasons she's afraid to marry Chris: 1) her fear that they are incompatible; 2) her fear that their sex life is inadequate; and 3) her belief that she is not yet "a woman". In that last, she fantasizes about a woman with whom she regularly commutes, and pictures the woman's "perfect" life. Waking from her reverie she leaves the subway and introduces her workplace. Logging on to her computer she sees her website and recalls how Chris had created it for her, and how she'd rebuffed his invitation to have a coffee because she was having sex with her boss Zach. Nonetheless, she goes out with Chris to see a movie for which she'd composed the soundtrack, and ends up inviting Chris back to her place where they had sex for the first time.

Once again in the present, Sonia and Chris travel with Nora and Mark to their new home; they bought it because Nora's expecting a child after the wedding. Mark advises Chris to force Sonia into a decision and he confronts her to set a deadline for when she'll decide whether to marry him or not. She hesitates and he tells her that even though he loves her and wants to spend the rest of their lives together he cannot remain in limbo forever, and suggests they put their relationship on hold until she makes up her mind.

While shopping Sonia encounters Lara, the fellow commuter from the subway, and they meet. They accidentally exchange shopping bags and Sonia finds Lara's blue thong and tries it on. Feeling sexy in the thong, when Anna suggests that a brief vacation might help Sonia clear her thoughts, she decides to fly to Rome to look up Fabrizio with whom she'd had a crush in college. In Rome, she meets Fabrizio and he and his brother Dezi get her drunk and have her model as a "'hipster" for an ad campaign. Afterwards, they go back to Dezi's apartment where despite Dezi's presence she allows Fabrizio to shave her pudenda and then goes to bed with him. When she wakes in the morning she finds a note from Fabrizio explaining that he's married and his wife is expecting their child so he hopes she won't mind that he "borrowed" all of her cash and her cellphone.

In New York, Nora reveals that Chris has been living with her and Mark since he moved out of Sonia's apartment. She invites Sonia to come to them for supper so that she can casually meet with Chris again but forgets to ensure that Chris will be there. Zach dumps some last-minute work on Sonia delaying her arrival at the dinner, and when she finally arrives Nora and Mark are fighting because Nora chose Gary, a male midwife, to help with the birth. Chris leaves for supper elsewhere to avoid spending time with Sonia.

At Mark and Nora's wedding three weeks after the failed proposal, Sonia begs Chris to be allowed to sit next to him and he agrees "if I don't have to speak to you". Nonetheless, they dance and Chris admits that he still loves her. The next morning they're back together in Sonia's apartment when he gets a call from Google offering him a job in San Francisco. While Chris is torn about what to do Sonia encourages him to take the job; he understands she wants to return to their non-committal relationship and he decides to take the job but break up with Sonia.

Lee tells Sonia that she too is pregnant, and after a discussion with Zach Sonia decides to propose to Chris. She prepares a DVD with photos of them together set to the song It Had to Be You and prepares to fly to San Francisco, but Mark tells her that Chris is in Pennsylvania visiting family. She gets on a bus to see him and encounters Lara who's traveling there for work, and she realizes that Lara's life is far from the perfect fantasy she'd imagined it to be. In the meantime, Nora is giving birth, and Sonia finds out that Chris has traveled from Pennsylvania to New York to be at the birth. She begs the bus driver to let her off, then races back to the hospital to see Gary the midwife presenting newborn Eli Bing to his parents. Chris is uncomfortable in her presence and prepares to leave the hospital room but Sonia begs him to watch the video first. Unfortunately, the sound doesn't work and Sonia hesitantly sings It Had to Be You. The rest of the people in the room start singing along with her and as the words "WILL YOU MARRY ME?" flash on the screen she gets down on her knees and asks him. "Of course I will," he says, and they kiss.

== Cast ==
- Cristin Milioti as Sonia
- Dan Soder as Chris
- Halley Feiffer as Nora
- Mark Gessner as Mark (Note: Credited as "Mark", his real name is used in the final scene when Nora says that her child's full name is Eli Bing Gessner.)
- Kate Simses as Lee
- Erica Sweany as Anna
- Danny Deferrari as Fabrizio
- Kyle Mooney as Gary the Midwife
- Rachel York as Lara
- Nick Mennell as Zach
- Nicolo Grelli as Dezi
- William Stephensen as Bus Driver
- Autumn Stein as Katie
- Rana Roy as Receptionist
- Baby Lucas as Eli Bing
- Michael Simon Hall as David
- Marie-Agnes Geha as Amanda
- David Ross as Noam
- Laura Sametz as Professor
- Kate Cullen Roberts as 80's Woman
- Hutchison Hancock as Woman on Beach
- Bryce Pinkham as TV Psychopath
- Eliza Bent as Italian Detective

== Release ==
It Had to Be You premiered at the 22nd annual Austin Film Festival in October, 2015. It was picked up for distribution by Samuel Goldwyn Films and had a limited theatrical release on October 21, 2016, earning $5.3K that weekend, and was streamed beginning December 20, 2016.

== Reception ==
Frank Scheck of The Hollywood Reporter gave the film a positive review, saying: "It Had to Be You ultimately demonstrates enough cleverness and inventiveness to make it more than a by-the-book entry in a genre that's become more than a little stale."

In a positive review, Gary Goldstein of the Los Angeles Times called it "a memorable romantic comedy that stands to bring back the genre's good name" and wrote that it "is as funny, endearing and enjoyably off-kilter as its adorable star, Cristin Milioti".

Conversely, Neil Genzlinger of The New York Times gave the film a mixed two-and-a-half stars out of five and wrote: "Cristin Milioti is so quirkily endearing in the lead role that she makes it easy to just go with the airy tale."
