= Robb Derringer =

American actor

- Born: Robbie Warren Derringer; July 6, 1967 (age 59); Palo Alto, California, United States
- Occupation: Actor
- Years active: 1996–present
- Website: RobbDerringer.com

Robbie Warren Derringer (born July 6, 1967) is an American actor.

== Early life ==
Derringer was born and raised in Palo Alto, California. He attended the UCLA School of Theater, Film and Television acting program and earned a Bachelor of Arts Degree. Upon graduation he was invited to join Diavolo Dance Theatre.

== Career ==
Derringer has been acting in television and films since 1996. He has also been a company member at the Pacific Resident Theatre, with leading roles in their productions of The Time of Your Life, Of Mice and Men, and The Blue Dahlia.

Derringer has appeared in the web series The Lake as Jack Riley, directed by Jason Priestley. He played Kyle Sloane on ABC's General Hospital in November 2014, and reprised the role in September 2015. He has had guest roles in shows such as CSI and NCIS. In 1999, he had a recurring role as Andrew Emery in Beverly Hills 90210.

In 2018, Derringer appeared in five episodes of the Facebook Watch drama Queen America in the recurring role of Robert Crowe, an old boyfriend of the show's main character, Vicki Ellis, played by Catherine Zeta Jones.

In 2022, Derringer appeared in the film Breaking premiered at the 2022 Sundance Film Festival on January 21, 2022, where the cast won the Special Jury Award for Ensemble Cast in the U.S. Dramatic Competition.[10] On February 1, 2022, Bleecker Street acquired the film's US distribution rights.[11][12] The film's title was later changed from 892 to Breaking, and it was set to be released on August 26, 2022.[13]

== Filmography ==
=== Film ===
| Year | Title | Role | Notes |
|---|---|---|---|
| 1997 | Air Force One | Halo 2 | |
| 2001 | The Myersons | Rob | |
| 2008 | Pie N Burger | Tony | Short film |
| 2008 | Ball Don't Lie | Jenkins | |
| 2009 | Imagine That | Financial Reporter | |
| 2016 | 8989 Redstone | Abner Voretz | |
| 2017 | Home Again | Dinner Guest | |
| 2018 | Creatress | Paul Beckett | |
| 2018 | Eve of Abduction | Jameson | |
| 2019 | Grace | Eli Walker Jr. | |
| 2022 | Breaking | Chief Jack Quail | |

=== Television ===
| Year | Title | Role | Notes |
|---|---|---|---|
| 1996 | Dr. Quinn, Medicine Woman | Soldier #2 | Episode: "Right or Wrong" |
| 1998 | Wind on Water | Rodney | Episode: "Threading the Needle" |
| 1998 | Flipper | Steve | Episode: "The Challenger" |
| 1998 | Jenny | Robby | Episode: "A Girl's Gotta Protect Her Assets" |
| 1998 | Night Man | Ginger | Episode: "Bad to the Bone" |
| 1998 | Fantasy Island | Matt | Episode: "We're not Worthy" |
| 1998 | Maggie Winters | Taylor | Episode: "When Sonny Gets The Blues" |
| 1999 | Odd Man Out | Phil | Episode: "In The Name of the Father" |
| 1999 | Time of Your Life | Kenny | Episode: "The Time They Threw That Party" |
| 1999 | Beverly Hills 90210 | Andrew Emery | 5 episodes |
| 2000 | Popular | Brad | Episode: "Are You There God? It's Me Ann-Margrete" |
| 2001 | CSI: Crime Scene Investigation | Fred Applewhite | Episode: "Evaluation Day" |
| 2001 | Inside Schwartz | Kyle | Episode: "Comic Relief Pitcher" |
| 2002 | Another Pretty Face | Ted O'Reilly | TV movie |
| 2004 | Yes, Dear | Rob | Episode "Greg Needs a Friend" |
| 2004 | CSI: Miami | Gabe Rotter | Episode: "Stalkerazzi" |
| 2004 | She Spies | Logan Spencer | Episode: "London Calling" |
| 2005 | NYPD Blue | Robert "Bobby" Friedman | Episode: "Stratis Fear" |
| 2005 | How I Met Your Mother | Derrick | Episode: "Sweet Taste of Liberty" |
| 2007 | Eyes | Seth Hauser | Episode: "Poison" |
| 2007 | In Case of Emergency | Mitch | Episode: "Disorder in the Court" |
| 2008 | Cold Case | Captain Rowland Hughes '60 | Episode: "Wings" |
| 2009 | The Lake | Jack | 12 episodes |
| 2009 | Melrose Place | Andrew Misher | Episode: "Windsor" |
| 2010 | All My Children | DA | 5 episodes |
| 2011 | Redesigning Your Life With Lainey Chase | David Williams | TV Pilot |
| 2012 | NCIS | John Phelps | Episode: "Recovery" |
| 2013 | The Young and the Restless | Wayne | 2 episodes |
| 2013 | Mom | Vic | Episode: "Estrogen and a Hearty Breakfast" |
| 2015 | Castle | Jeffrey Wadlow | Episode: "Hong Kong Hustle" |
| 2015 | The Odd Couple | Bill | Episode: "Sleeping Dogs Lie" |
| 2015 | Murder in the First | Paul Stevenson | Episode: "Bruja Blanca" |
| 2015 | The Exes | Dan | Episode: "Gone Girls" |
| 2014–2015 | General Hospital | Kyle Sloane | 18 episodes |
| 2017 | Days of Our Lives | Scooter Nelson | 12 episodes |
| 2018 | Queen America | Robert Crowe | 5 episodes |
| 2019 | Agents of S.H.I.E.L.D. | Thomas | Episode: "From the Ashes" |
| 2019 | Stumptown | Randall Tapper | 2 episodes |
