= Rana Roy =

British singer, dancer and actress

Rana Roy is a British singer, dancer, and actress.

Rana Roy was born on October 1, 1986, in London.

- In 2007 she was part of the winning Team Bruno on the reality show DanceX, and went on to join the song and dance group Pulse
- In 2008 she starred in the British TV series Britannia High
- In 2013 she was both a dancer in and the choreographer of Sharkproof (released in 2014 as Almost Sharkproof)
- In 2016 she appeared as "the Receptionist" in It Had to Be You
- In 2015-2017 she had a recurring role as Vimla in seasons 4 and 5 of Switched at Birth
- In 2017 she had a recurring role as Devi in season 2 of Underground
- In 2017 she had a recurring role as Dr. Amira Renowi on season 4 of The Night Shift
- In 2018 she had a recurring role as Pippa on Life Sentence
- In 2018-2019 she starred in the Facebook Watch drama series Queen America as Mary Clark
- In 2019-2022 she guest starred on the Hulu series Ramy as Yasmina in seasons 1 and 2, and became a recurring character in season 3
- In 2020 she appeared on episode 4 of the Netflix series Social Distance
- In 2021 she had a recurring role on season 8 of The Blacklist as Priya Laghari
- In 2021 she guest starred as Reema on the 2021 reboot of Gossip Girl

== Filmography ==
=== Films and television ===
Year	Title	Role(s)	Notes
2008	Britannia High	Lola	Main role
2010	Love Across Time	Meg	Short film
2013	Children of the Witch	Karina	Short film
2014	The Michael J. Fox Show	Megan	Episode: "Sochi"
2014	Black Box	Yoga Instructor	Episode: "The Fear"
2015	It Had to Be You	Receptionist	Cameo appearance
2015–2017	Switched at Birth	Vimla	Recurring role
2016	Mary + Jane	Lauren Y	Episode: "Noachella"
2017	Underground	Devi	3 episodes
2017	The Night Shift	Dr. Amira Anawi	Recurring role
2018	Life Sentence	Pippa	Recurring role
2018–2019	Queen America	Mary Clark	Main role
2019	American Princess	Farah	2 episodes
2020	Social Distance	Aliya	Episode: "Zero Feet Away"
2020–2022	Ramy	Yasmina	Recurring role
2021	The Blacklist	Priya Laghari	2 episodes
2021	Gossip Girl	Reema	3 episodes
2021	Queens	Alicia	Recurring role
2021–2023	Harlem	Mira	Recurring role
