= Vengeance (2022 film) =

2022 American black comedy film by B. J. Novak

- Theatrical release poster
- Directed by: B. J. Novak
- Written by: B. J. Novak
- Produced by: Jason Blum; Greg Gilreath; Adam Hendricks
- Starring: B. J. Novak; Boyd Holbrook; J. Smith-Cameron; Lio Tipton; Dove Cameron; Issa Rae; Ashton Kutcher
- Cinematography: Lyn Moncrief
- Edited by: Andy Canny; Hilda Rasula; Plummy Tucker
- Music by: Finneas O'Connell
- Production companies: Blumhouse Productions; Divide/Conquer
- Distributed by: Focus Features (United States); Universal Pictures (International)
- Release dates: June 12, 2022 (Tribeca); July 29, 2022 (United States)
- Running time: 107 minutes
- Country: United States
- Language: English
- Box office: $4.4 million

Vengeance is a 2022 American black comedy crime thriller film written and directed by B. J. Novak in his directorial debut. The neo-Western and neo-noir film stars Novak, Boyd Holbrook, J. Smith-Cameron, Lio Tipton, Dove Cameron, Issa Rae and Ashton Kutcher. The film follows Ben Manalowitz (Novak), a New York City journalist who travels to rural Texas to attend the funeral of a girl (Tipton) he hooked up with, after being persuaded by her brother (Holbrook), who then recommends they avenge her drug-related death, with her family believing that she was murdered. He decides to stick around in town, after his producer recommends him to develop her death into a true crime podcast story patronizing the rural community into caricatures of themselves.

Jason Blum is a producer under his Blumhouse Productions banner, and Greg Gilreath and Adam Hendricks are producers under their Divide/Conquer banner.

Vengeance premiered at the Tribeca Festival on June 12, 2022, and was released in the United States on July 29, 2022 by Focus Features. It received generally favorable reviews from critics, who praised Novak's direction and script, and grossed $4.4 million worldwide.

== Plot ==
New York City journalist Ben Manalowitz is phoned by a stranger, Ty Shaw, who informs him that one of his many casual romantic flings, Abilene "Abby" Shaw, has died of an apparent opioid overdose. At Ty's insistence, Ben flies out to Roca Fria County in West Texas to attend the funeral. In the small town of Banefield, He meets Abby's family–brother Ty, mother Sharon, sisters Paris and Kansas City, younger brother Mason (referred to as "El Stupido"), and Granny Carole. Ty informs Ben that he suspects Abby was actually murdered, adamantly maintaining that she never took drugs, and asks Ben to accompany him to find the truth and avenge her. After conferring with his podcast producer Eloise, Ben elects to aid them as part of a story he will produce about grief and denial.

Ben and Ty meet Ty's friend Crawl, who explains that parties often occur at the oil fields and tells Ben of an area nearby the fields dubbed "the Afterparty", an area between law enforcement jurisdictions where dead bodies have been reported over time. Crawl and Ty suspect Sancholo, a local drug dealer. Stopping in Marfa, Ben meets Quentin Sellers, an eccentric record producer and, like Ben, an outsider who is college-educated but has come to adopt Texas as his home. He gives Ben a memory stick with recordings of Abby performing. Ben confronts Sancholo to discuss Abby's death, and he reveals he was in Tulsa at the time. After watching a rodeo with the Shaw family, Ben walks to his car which then suddenly explodes. Ben receives a call from Eloise, telling him that the story is complete – and his best ever – and expects him to now return to New York.

More details about Abby are revealed by the Shaws. Granny explains Abby was a drug user, which Ty admits to lying about to get closer to her (supposed) boyfriend. Ben angrily lambasts the Shaw family for living an isolated existence from modern America, as Ty gradually gets angry about Ben's reluctance to come down and discover how Abby died. An exhausted Ben finally reveals that he and Abby were hooking up and were never a couple, and Ty punches him before walking away. After Sharon suggests Abby's drug addiction was fed by the distance she felt from people in her life, Ben included, he miserably records his failure to find a compelling outcome and his own self-loathing.

Later that night in Abby's room, Mason mentions how Abby would speak in code with him, saying "1435" (for the letters in "I love you mucho"). In realization, Ben uses the number to unlock Abby's phone, finding a contact labeled "Ben", which Abby did to make her family believe she was texting with a New York boyfriend (thus the Shaws' misunderstanding). The last few messages indicate that Abby was abandoned by the unknown Texas "Ben" as she lay dying.

Armed with one of Ty's pistols, Ben rides with Mason to a party at the oil fields. Ben learns that his car was bombed by Texas Tech Red Raiders fans from the rodeo, merely for him chanting for the Texas Longhorns. Ben finds Ty and Quentin, and the latter invites him to a private tent to converse. Inside, Ben notices a stash of opioids and witnesses one of Quentin's teenage singers being dragged away to "the Afterparty". After turning off his recorder, Ben elicits a confession from Quentin, who confirms that he caused Abby to overdose and left her to die. Ben reveals that he actually recorded the confession on his phone, to which Quentin responds with a speech about the nature of Ben's story and how ever-questioning audiences will shift their negative attention from Quentin (who only "left somebody to die" of their own overdose) to Ben and then toward the Shaws. Ben stops the recording and then executes Quentin with Ty's pistol. Upon returning to the Shaw house, Ben reconciles with Ty and Sharon. Before departing from Texas, Ben remotely deletes all copies of his recordings, electing to keep the story between the Shaws and himself.

== Cast ==
- B. J. Novak as Ben Manalowitz
- Boyd Holbrook as Ty Shaw
- J. Smith-Cameron as Sharon Shaw
- Lio Tipton as Abilene Shaw
- Dove Cameron as Kansas City Shaw
- Isabella Amara as Paris Shaw
- Eli Abrams Bickel as Mason "El Stupido" Shaw
- Louanne Stephens as Granny Carole
- Zach Villa as Sancholo
- Issa Rae as Eloise
- Ashton Kutcher as Quentin Sellers
- Rio Alexander as Sheriff Jimenez

In addition, singers John Mayer and Chevel Shepherd each make cameo appearances as Ben's New York friend and a young Texas singer, respectively, while radio show host Terry Gross has an uncredited voice cameo as Robin, host of a radio show.

== Production ==
Between 2015 and 2018, B. J. Novak, who lives in Los Angeles, California, took several trips to Texas to do research for a film he wanted to write about a blue state podcaster who travels to a red state. In March 2020, it was announced Novak would direct and star in the film, with Issa Rae, Ashton Kutcher, and Boyd Holbrook joining the cast.

Principal photography began in Albuquerque, New Mexico in March 2020, but was halted due to the COVID-19 pandemic. In January 2021, Isabella Amara joined the cast and production resumed that month. In March 2021, J. Smith-Cameron and Lio Tipton joined the cast, with Focus Features set to distribute. Tipton came out as non-binary, and changed their given name from Analeigh to Lio, just three months after signing on to the film, making this their first work credited as Lio Tipton when it was released in June 2022.

Finneas O'Connell composed the film score. The soundtrack was released by Back Lot Music.

== Release ==
Vengeance premiered on June 12, 2022, at the Tribeca Festival and was theatrically released in the United States on July 29, 2022. On September 16, 2022, it was released on Peacock to stream exclusively on the platform. The film was released on Blu-ray and DVD 4 days later on September 20, 2022.

== Reception ==
=== Box office ===
In the United States and Canada, Vengeance was released alongside DC League of Super-Pets, and was projected to gross around $2 million from 998 theaters on its opening weekend. The film made $650,000 on its first day and a total of $1.8 million over the weekend, finishing 10th. Deadline Hollywood noted that while the amount was "not super," being a low-budget film that received a theatrical release would make it "more attractive and stand-out in a streaming and PVOD menu." The film fell 60% to $720,000 in its second weekend.

=== Critical response ===
On the review aggregator website Rotten Tomatoes, 81% of 159 critics' reviews are positive, with an average rating of 6.9/10. The website's critical consensus reads, "Writer-director-star B.J. Novak could have taken a sharper approach to this dark comedy's deeper themes, but if you're in the mood for a slyly smart mystery, Vengeance is yours." Metacritic, which uses a weighted average, assigned the film a score of 65 out of 100, based on 39 critics, indicating "generally favorable reviews". Audiences polled by CinemaScore gave the film an average grade of "B+" on an A+ to F scale, while PostTrak gave the film a 76% overall positive score, with 57% saying they would definitely recommend it.
