= Isabella Amara =

American actress and singer

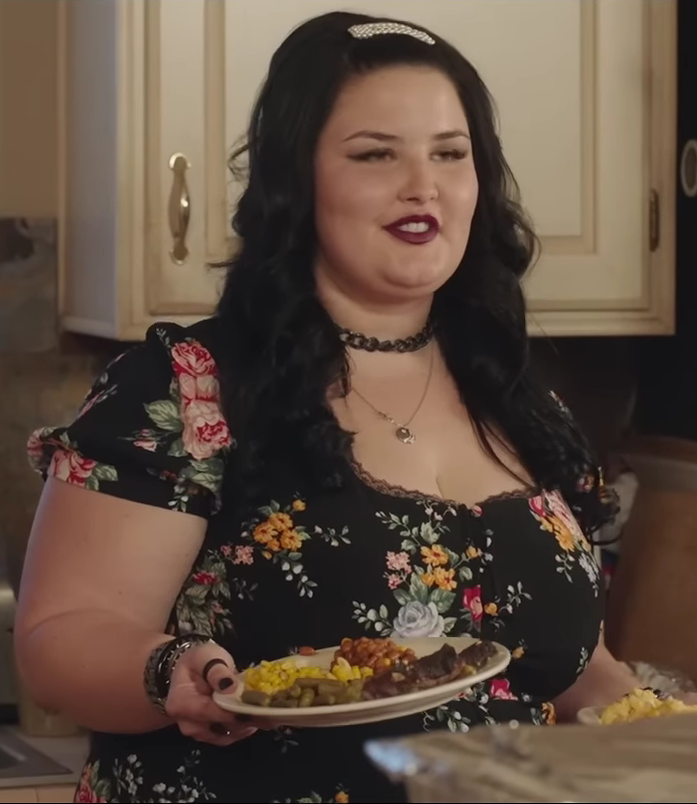
- Amara in Vengeance (2022)
- Born: October 9, 1998 (age 28); Atlanta, Georgia, U.S.
- Occupations: Actress; singer
- Years active: 2010–present

Isabella Amara (born October 9, 1998) is an American actress and singer. She gained attention for her role as Sally Avril in the films Spider-Man: Homecoming (2017) and Avengers: Infinity War (2018). She is also known for her role in the television series Queen America (2018–19).

== Career ==
Amara gained an interest in entertainment at an early age doing community theatre. Since then she has made minor appearance in major films such as Joyful Noise, Barely Lethal and Middle School: The Worst Years of My Life. She appeared in a supporting role in The Boss as teenage Michelle Darnell (portrayed by Melissa McCarthy).

In 2017, she appeared in the comedy-drama film Wilson, portraying the daughter of Woody Harrelson and Laura Dern's characters, and played Sally Avril in the Marvel Studios production Spider-Man: Homecoming. She reprised the latter role in Avengers: Infinity War (2018).

In 2022, she appeared as Luna in the last two episodes of the second season of the teen drama series Euphoria.

== Filmography ==
=== Film ===
Year	Title	Role	Notes
2012	Joyful Noise	Our Lady of Perpetual Tears Choir Member	
2013	Empire State	Young Vicky	Uncredited
2015	Barely Lethal	Heckler #2	
2016	The Boss	15-Year-Old Michelle	
2016	Middle School: The Worst Years of My Life	Heidi	
2017	Wilson	Claire	Lead
2017	Spider-Man: Homecoming	Sally Avril	
2018	The Tale	Franny	
2018	Alex Strangelove	Gretchen	
2018	Avengers: Infinity War	Sally Avril	
2022	Vengeance	Paris	
2022	Spider-Man: No Way Home a.k.a. The More Fun Stuff Version	Sally Avril	Extended cut theatrical release of the 2021 release; archive footage: post-credits scene

=== Television ===
Year	Title	Role	Notes
2018–2019	Queen America	Bella Ellis	Main cast
2022	Euphoria	Luna	Episodes: "The Theater and Its Double" and "All My Life, My Heart Has Yearned for a Thing I Cannot Name"
