= Fun Mom Dinner =

2017 film by Alethea Jones

- Theatrical release poster
- Directed by: Alethea Jones
- Written by: Julie Yaeger Rudd
- Produced by: Andrew Duncan; Alex Saks; Naomi Scott
- Starring: Toni Collette; Molly Shannon; Bridget Everett; Katie Aselton; Adam Scott; Rob Huebel; Adam Levine; Paul Rust
- Cinematography: Sean McElwee
- Edited by: Jonathan Corn
- Music by: Julian Wass
- Production companies: June Pictures; Gettin Rad Productions
- Distributed by: Momentum Pictures
- Release dates: January 27, 2017 (Sundance); August 4, 2017 (United States)
- Running time: 81 minutes
- Country: United States
- Language: English

Fun Mom Dinner is a 2017 American comedy film directed by Alethea Jones, from a screenplay by Julie Rudd. It stars Katie Aselton, Toni Collette, Bridget Everett, Molly Shannon, Adam Scott, and Adam Levine.

The film had its world premiere at the Sundance Film Festival on January 27, 2017. It was released on August 4, 2017, by Momentum Pictures.

== Plot ==
When four moms come together for a "fun mom dinner", the night takes an unexpected turn.

== Cast ==
- Toni Collette as Kate
- Molly Shannon as Jamie
- Bridget Everett as Melanie
- Katie Aselton as Emily
- Adam Scott as Tom
- Rob Huebel as Andrew
- Adam Levine as Luke
- Paul Rust as Barry
- Sam Lerner as Alex
- Kathryn Prescott as Zoe
- Jaz Sinclair as Olivia
- Hart Denton as James
- Paul Rudd as Brady
- David Wain as Wayne
- John Early as Alfred
- Jessie Ennis as Francesca
- Jessica Chaffin as Jen
- Emmersyn Fiorentino as Grace
- Owen Vaccaro as Lucas
- Caleb and Matthew Paddock as Henry

== Production ==
On June 22, 2016, it was reported that Alethea Jones would direct Fun Mom Dinner from a script by Julie Yaeger Rudd, featuring a cast including Toni Collette, Molly Shannon, Bridget Everett, and Adam Scott. Filming began that day in Los Angeles. Julian Wass composed the film's score.

== Release ==
The film had its world premiere at the Sundance Film Festival on January 27, 2017. Prior to Sundance, Momentum Pictures and Netflix acquired U.S. distribution rights to the film. It was released in a limited release and through video on demand on August 4, 2017. It was released through Netflix on December 31, 2017.

== Reception ==
=== Critical response ===
Fun Mom Dinner received generally negative reviews from critics. On review aggregator Rotten Tomatoes, the film holds a 33% approval rating, based on 27 reviews, with an average rating of 4.45/10. Metacritic gives the film a weighted average score of 46 out of 100, based on 12 critics, indicating "mixed or average" reviews.

Reviewing the film for The New York Times, Nicole Herrington called it a "thin script" but praised the chemistry along the leads, and Everett's performance. Christy Lemire reviewing for Roger Ebert's website gave the film one-and-a-half stars on the basis that the film "makes the repeated mistake of banging us over the head with its running gags and needlessly spelling everything out, making the movie feel longer than its 81 minutes," and summarizing that "These are indeed moms, and they do have dinner, but the “fun” part is in short supply." The A.V. Club gave the film a "C" grade calling the film uninspired, and "undeniably disappointing when a movie called Fun Mom Dinner isn’t, well, much fun."

=== Accolades ===
Year	Award	Category	Nominee	Result
2018	Guild of Music Supervisors Awards	Best Music Supervision for Films Budgeted Under $5 Million	Howard Paar	Nominated
2018	Yoga Awards	You Too Award	Alethea Jones	Won
