= Bluebird (Marvel Comics) =

- Bluebird as depicted in Marvel Legacy: The 1990s Handbook #1 (February 2007). Art by Pat Olliffe.

Publication information
- Publisher: Marvel Comics
- First appearance: Amazing Fantasy #15 (August 1962)
- Created by: As Sally Avril: Stan Lee (writer) Steve Ditko (artist); As Bluebird: Kurt Busiek (writer) Pat Olliffe (artist)

In-story information
- Full name: Sally Avril
- Species: Human
- Partnerships: Spider-Man
- Abilities: Equipments include insulated boots against electricity, ether-filled "eggs", paint pellets, and a retractable rope line; Accomplished gymnast

Bluebird (Sally Avril), sometimes rendered Blue Bird, is a fictional character appearing in American comic books published by Marvel Comics. She is usually depicted as a supporting character in the Spider-Man series.

In other media, Sally Avril has appeared in the animated series The Spectacular Spider-Man, voiced by Grey DeLisle; in the film The Amazing Spider-Man (2012), portrayed by Kelsey Asbille; and in the Marvel Cinematic Universe (MCU) films Spider-Man: Homecoming (2017), Avengers: Infinity War (2018), and Spider-Man: No Way Home (2021), played by Isabella Amara.

== Publication history ==
Created by Stan Lee and Steve Ditko, Sally Avril first appeared in Amazing Fantasy #15 (1962). Sally was a minor member of Flash Thompson's entourage, appearing in only one issue during the Silver Age. Her "Bluebird" career was created by Kurt Busiek (scripts) and Pat Olliffe (pencils) in 1996.

== Fictional character biography ==
Sally Avril is a fellow student of Peter Parker's at Midtown High who turned him down for a date, preferring Flash Thompson.

Thirty years later, Sally was reintroduced in Kurt Busiek's series Untold Tales of Spider-Man. She is revealed to be an ambitious, thrill-loving girl who took blue ribbons in gymnastics. With fellow popular kid Jason Ionello, she attempts to cash in on a Daily Bugle contest offering a thousand dollars to a reader who brought in pictures of Spider-Man. Although their mission is a bust, Sally loves the thrill and becomes smitten with Spider-Man when he touches her cheek just before leaving her and Jason with a warning to give it up.

Sally and Jason tail Spider-Man, who has been hypnotized into working for Electro. The flash from Sally's camera rouses Spidey from his hypnotic state, and a well-placed kick by Sally takes Electro by surprise long enough for Spidey to defeat him. Spider-Man poses for a shot with an ecstatic Sally and Jason that the Bugle ran.

Sally attempts to get a permanent gig on the Bugle, but is told that the photographer's job is already taken by Peter Parker. Sally dons an eccentric blue-and-white costume and decides to become a superheroine utilizing her aerobic skills. She asks Peter to take pictures of her doing stunts, but Peter refuses. Angered, she threatens to blackmail him by revealing that he took pictures of Spider-Man, but he undercuts her by telling them himself.

Bluebird's zeal but lack of experience causes trouble for Spider-Man during fights with Scarlet Beetle and Electro. Her "ether egg" weapons detonate prematurely or have little effect, once even allowing the villain to escape. Considering Bluebird more trouble than she is worth, Spider-Man allows Black Knight's men to hurt her to dissuade her from interfering in his fights again, although he later feels remorse for his actions.

Bruised but undaunted, Sally and Jason head to an area where Spider-Man is fighting the Black Knight, with Sally's camera. Sally begs Jason to speed in his car, and the two run a red light. Their car strikes an oncoming bus, with Jason sustaining mild head trauma and Sally being killed.

In Dead No More: The Clone Conspiracy, Sally Avril is resurrected by Ben Reilly posing as Jackal.

== Powers and abilities ==
Bluebird has no superpowers. However, she uses a retractable rope line, insulated boots for protection against electricity, blue paint pellets, and ether-filled "eggs." Additionally, Bluebird is a skilled gymnast.

== Reception ==
In 2022, Comic Book Resources (CBR) ranked Sally Avril 2nd in their "10 Best Comic Book Characters Grey DeLisle Has Played" list.

== In other media ==
=== Television ===
Sally Avril appears in The Spectacular Spider-Man, voiced by Grey DeLisle. This version is a cheerleader at Midtown High School, Randy Robertson's girlfriend, and a member of the school's popular clique who displays "mean girl" traits. As a result, she is unkind to her peers and bears particular animosity towards Peter Parker, though she gradually softens up to him during the second season.

=== Film ===
- Sally Avril makes a cameo appearance in The Amazing Spider-Man (2012), portrayed by Kelsey Chow. While she goes unnamed, she is identified in the film's novelization and by Chow herself.
- A character named Sally makes minor appearances in the Marvel Cinematic Universe films Spider-Man: Homecoming (2017), Avengers: Infinity War (2018), and the extended edition of Spider-Man: No Way Home (2021), portrayed by Isabella Amara. This version is a member of the Midtown School of Science and Technology's academic decathlon team.
