= South Brunswick High School =

South Brunswick High School can refer to:

- South Brunswick High School (New Jersey)
- South Brunswick High School (North Carolina)
