= Bureau of Drug Abuse Control =

Former narcotics law enforcement bureau of the FDA

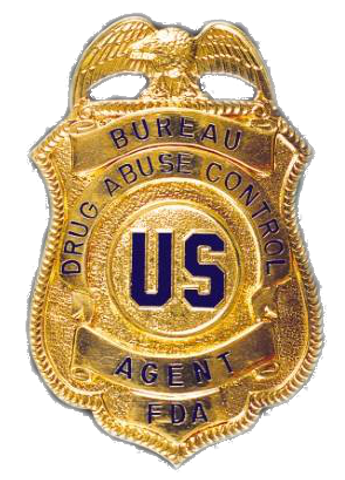
- Abbreviation: BDAC

Agency overview
- Formed: February 1, 1966
- Dissolved: April 1, 1968
- Superseding agency: Bureau of Narcotics and Dangerous Drugs

Jurisdictional structure
- Operations jurisdiction: United States of America

Operational structure
- Overseen by: Commissioner of Food and Drugs
- Agency executive: John Finlator, Director
- Parent agency: Food and Drug Administration

The Bureau of Drug Abuse Control (BDAC) was an American law enforcement agency that investigated the consumption, trafficking, and distribution of drugs and controlled substances. BDAC was a bureau of the Food and Drug Administration (FDA). In the sum total of the two years that BDAC existed, it investigated and closed around 300 criminal cases, seized 43 clandestine drug laboratories, and made over 1,300 arrests.

== Organizational structure ==
=== Director ===
John Finlator was appointed Director of BDAC by FDA commissioner Dr. James L. Goddard on March 7, 1966. Finlator served as the first and only director of the bureau. Finlator later became the deputy director of the Bureau of Narcotics and Dangerous Drugs (BNDD) until his resignation from the government in 1972. Finlator later became an advocate for decriminalizing marijuana and a founding member of NORML.

=== Deputy Director ===
Frederick M. Garfield was deputy director of BDAC.

=== Assistant Director ===
Jack Bologna was the agent in charge of the Boston field office and assistant director of BDAC.

=== Chiefs ===
Kenneth Durrin was the chief of the Accountability Investigations Branch.

=== Offices ===
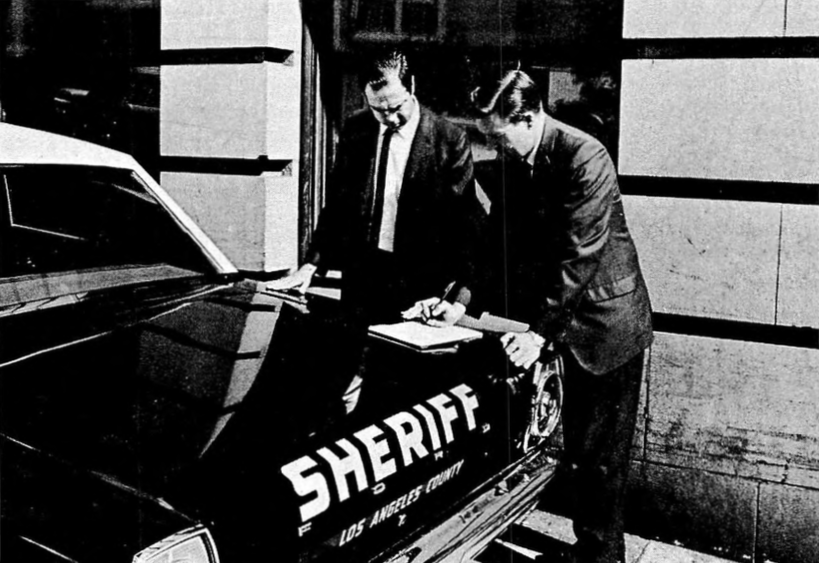
BDAC agents studying the details of an investigation outside of the LA Sheriff's office

BDAC special agents worked closely with local sheriffs and police departments all over the United States to accomplish their mission. Investigations could be initiated and/or closed by either BDAC or local law enforcement. Most BDAC drug seizures were the result of joint investigations with these local units.

BDAC had 3 divisions;

- Case Assistance
- Drug Studies and Statistics
- Investigations

BDAC had 9 regional field offices. Although each of these cities also had FDA district offices, BDAC field offices were not located in the same buildings, and were sometimes located on the other side of town;

BDAC field offices

In those cities where there was no BDAC office, like Miami, there were BDAC "agents in residence" - usually just one agent working out of a BDAC Residence Office somewhere in the FDA building. However, in Seattle, FDA relied heavily on assistance from other federal agencies, to include the narcotics unit in the Bureau of Customs.

== Mission and history ==
The Bureau of Drug Abuse Control (BDAC) was formed as a part of the United States Food and Drug Administration (FDA) on February 1, 1966, by President Lyndon B. Johnson and existed until 1968 when it was merged with the Federal Bureau of Narcotics (FBN) to form the Bureau of Narcotics and Dangerous Drugs (BNDD).

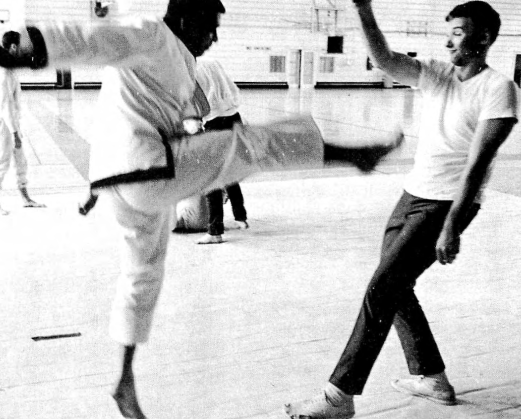
BDAC agents training in martial arts, 1967.

The Bureau of Drug Abuse Control (BDAC) was created to address the congressional mandate from the drug abuse amendments in the Drug Abuse Control Act of 1965. BDAC was the FDA's first real venture into managing a major law enforcement organization, where FDA inspectors prior to its inception had never been trained in undercover work, policing tactics, or strict firearms familiarization.

BDAC was empowered to pursue investigations related to what were called by President Johnson "dangerous drugs," but not what were legally defined as "narcotics. There was a differentiation between the FBN and BDAC here: FBN had jurisdiction over "narcotics" such as marijuana, cocaine, opium, and their derivatives. BDAC had jurisdiction over those other drugs that were considered "dangerous drugs", including LSD and hallucinogenics. Marijuana was not in BDAC's remit or vested enumerated power to pursue, and vice-versa, the FBN did not pursue LSD. However, charges in LSD arrests made by BDAC incidentally sometimes included charges of possession of marijuana. Finlator also wrote that marijuana would often be laced with LSD, confusing the jurisdictional remit.

The director of the bureau wrote in the official FDA first year-end review of BDAC:

"The activities of the Bureau of Drug Abuse Control range over a spectrum that can be divided into four general categories;
1. Providing accurate information for all segments of the population on the hazards of dangerous drugs. The purpose of this program is to confront every person in a situation susceptible to drug abuse with the consequences of drug experimentation or habituation.
2. Encouraging voluntary compliance of the pharmaceutical industry. The Bureau provides information on the provisions dealing with manufacturing and accountability, so that all members of the industry will understand their responsibilities.
3. Making seizures, and instituting criminal prosecution of persons or firms who violate the law. The law does not provide for the arrest of persons habituated to these drugs; rather, it is hoped that with the cooperation of local, State, and Federal agencies such people can be returned to society through suitable treatment and rehabilitation.
4. Studying the drug abuser. The Bureau makes, or contracts for, studies of the problems and behavioral patterns of drug abusers."

One important note about BDAC agents that made them different from all other law enforcement agents: while their primary objective was to investigate dangerous drugs - they were at the same time FDA inspectors, and would sometimes assist normal FDA investigations into substances that were not drugs; fish, cheese, vitamins, raw eggs, and so on. This dual function is notable when BDAC agents in the San Antonio residence office - alongside investigating a substantial amount of drugs and shutting down an entire criminal network - investigated and seized a sausage press that was producing potentially life-threatening sausage on the same premises. When sausage is pressed improperly, it can create botulism toxin, and the BDAC agents knew to instantly shut it down.

=== Training program ===
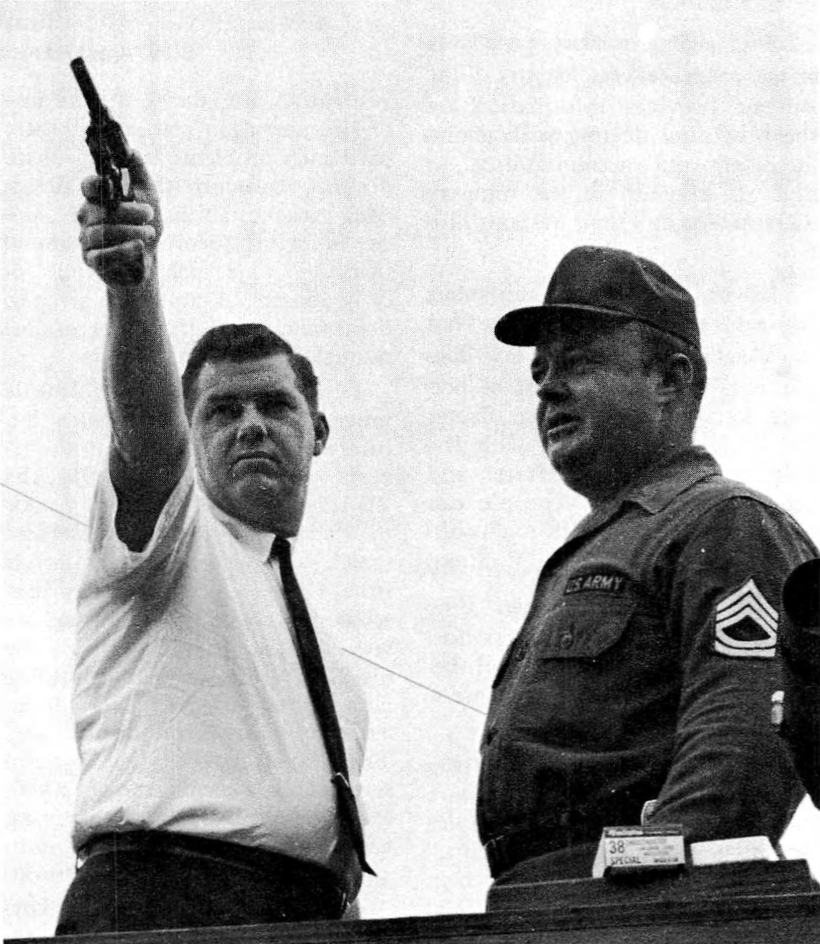
BDAC agent qualifies with a Colt 38 special

After BDAC recruits went through standard FDA inspector training, BDAC agents were transferred to begin their professional training at the School of Criminology at the University of California, Berkeley. The training program was created and overseen by Joseph D. Lohman and Robert M. Carter.

Agents would be trained in drug identification, counterfeiting of drugs, drug accountability, social and psychological theories of criminal behavior, and rehabilitation of drug users. They would attend lectures from visiting outside experts including district attorneys and federal and state representatives. Agents would then be trained in firearms, martial arts, undercover investigations, and criminal networks.

All BDAC agents were required to maintain firearms proficiency during throughout their career.

== Major cases in BDAC's brief existence ==
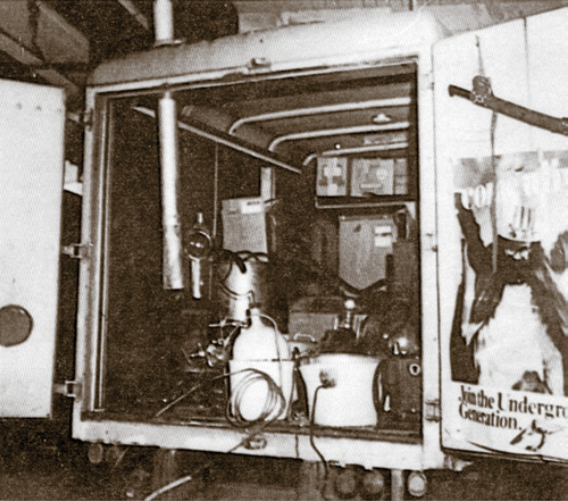
Hallucinogenic lab built into a milk truck in Denver, seized by BDAC agents.

In early 1966, undercover agents in the Denver BDAC office were able to illegally purchase more than 11,000 amphetamines from D.O. Varrian Tritt in Salt Lake City. In January 1967, Tritt was sentenced to a year in federal prison.

In January of 1967, Baltimore BDAC worked with the Virginia State Police to seize 3.25 million amphetamines and barbiturates from John Hill Cooper in Woodford, Virginia. This investigation was initiated in North Carolina, where a further five individuals were arrested later that month and an additional 96,000 units seized.

Later in January, undercover agents from Chicago BDAC were able to illegally purchase 2 million amphetamines from the company Plymouth Laboratories in Plymouth, Michigan, which initiated an investigation of the company. On February 1, 1967, Chicago BDAC worked with the United States Marshals and the Michigan State Police to seize 74 million units of drugs from the lab's headquarters. The company's license was revoked by the state of Michigan as was its federal narcotics tax stamp.

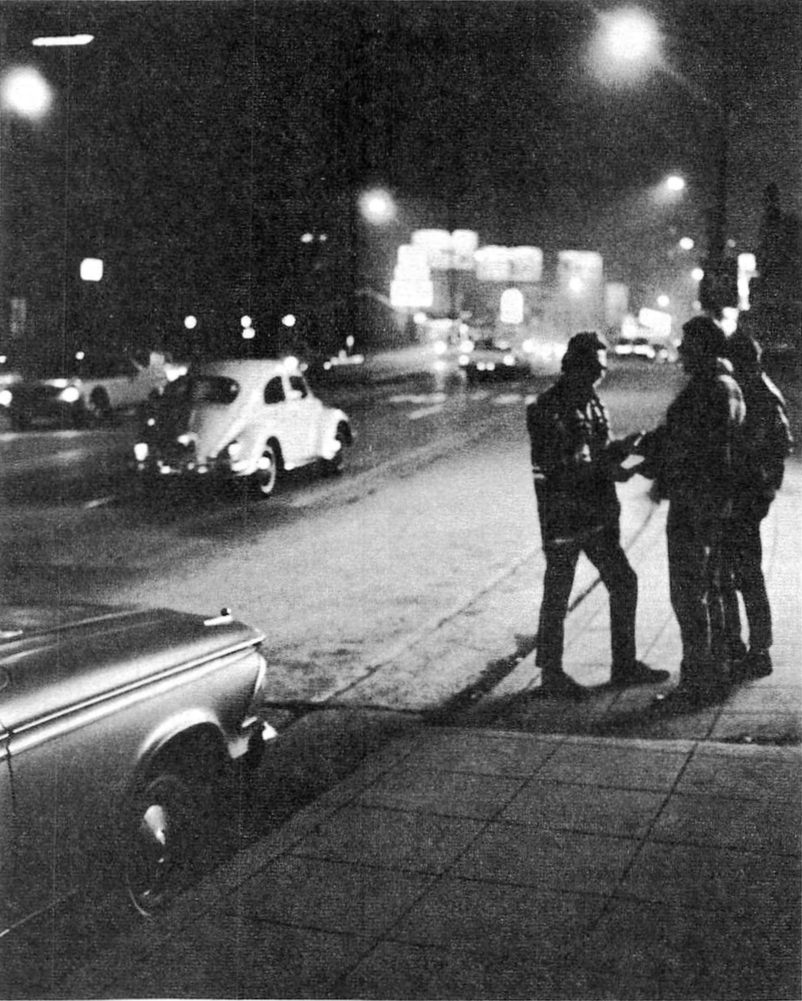
BDAC agent attempting an undercover drug purchase in Los Angeles.

In April 1967, Boston BDAC worked with the Boston Police Department to raid a motorcycle gang. BDAC seized thousands of dollars' worth of LSD, amphetamines, barbiturates, marijuana, and hashish - as well as two 25 caliber Beretta automatics and an unspecified number of knives. These agents incidentally solved a New Hampshire missing persons case, discovering a 17 year old runaway girl living with the gang.

In April 1967, the District Attorney of Nassau County initiated an investigation with New York BDAC to discover the source of LSD being sold on a university campus. Undercover agents were able to illegally purchase LSD from someone on the campus, and he was arrested on May 3, 1967.

In late July 1967, an agent from Chicago BDAC and an officer of the Chicago Police Department were in a shootout with a suspect named Ronald F. Okon, killing him in the process.

In October 1967, Atlanta BDAC, New York BDAC, and the Miami BDAC Residence Office collaborated with the New York State Police, the Florida state police, and the Florida Bureau of Narcotics to shut down a pharmacist who was illegally selling benzedrine capsules to interstate truck drivers without prescriptions.

In October 1967, the BDAC San Antonio Residence Office shut down a criminal network and a clandestine hallucinogenic laboratory, seizing $5,000 worth of LSD, peyote and mescaline. $1,000 worth of marijuana and lab equipment was also seized. Incidentally, they also seized a sausage press - the FDA, BDAC's parent agency, regulated sausage meat.

In late 1967, the Colorado Highway Patrol were performing a routine search of a vehicle reported by the Moffat County Sheriff's office, and discovered a mobile hallucinogenic drug laboratory built into the back of a milk truck. The patrol officers called Denver BDAC, which arrived on the scene and seized LSD, mescaline, DET, raw chemicals, the equipment to make the drugs, and the truck itself.

In early 1968, Dallas BDAC worked with Los Angeles BDAC and the Los Angeles Police Department (LAPD) to perform an arrest of a father-son drug dealing operation. The son, who sold methamphetamine to BDAC agents was arrest in Dallas. The father was arrested in Los Angeles by the LAPD.

In early 1968, Los Angeles BDAC worked with the LAPD to shut down a clandestine drug laboratory after a local chemist afraid for his life had contacted the LAPD to say that he had been forced to manufacture LSD. Around the same time, the two units managed to shut down an unrelated DMT laboratory and arrest the young suburban couple running the lab.

== Clash of cultures: FBN vs. BDAC ==
When FBN Commissioner Harry J. Anslinger reached the forced retirement age in 1965, he passed on the torch to Henry Giordano. Giordano was not well-equipped to absorb the power vacuum left behind by Anslinger's absence, or to confront the changing cultural perception of narcotics in American society. Additionally, with Anslinger gone, President Johnson felt much more comfortable negotiating with Congress about how to address the new societal perception of narcotics and drugs. Anslinger was perhaps just as powerful as J. Edgar Hoover had been before him and had "dirt" on almost every power player in Washington, and had been the head of his agency since the Prohibition era. Anslinger had also seen the creation of a culture at FBN abundant in corruption, performance quotas, and a dismissive attitude toward addicts.

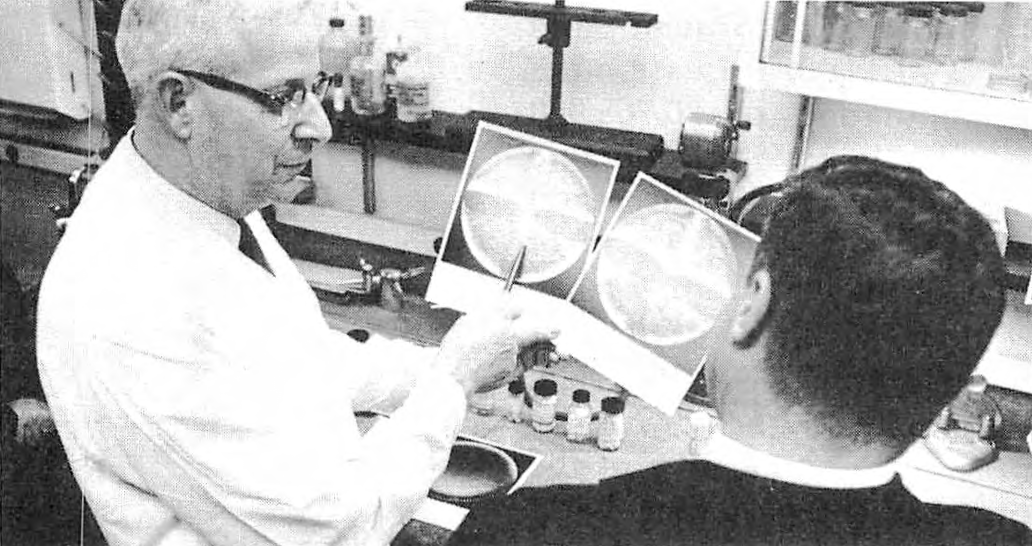
BDAC agent recruit studies drug identification with a doctor at the FDA.

BDAC's culture when it began was very different - instead of treating addicts as criminals, Finlator sought to address the medical causes of addiction alongside his enforcement approach against those criminals he called "peddlers," and "pushers." Finlator called his approach the "statistical-psychological-educational" approach, and it stood opposed to the FBN approach, which saw drug users as deviants.

While Giordano's rein on the FBN direction was starting to crumble, and the FBN was targeted by its political rivals, FBN agents began leaving the organization for other agencies. Many of them wound up at BDAC, and eventually began to replace the original FDA BDAC staffs - to the point where many of the original BDAC agents decided to leave the BDAC, seeing the culture become eradicated and replaced by the FBN culture.

As the Special Agent in Charge of the New York Field office said in a testimony:

"Anyway, it was a disappointment, the agency, to me, the 18 months or whatever I was in there, because it wasn't, in my mind, an FDA type agency. We were overwhelmed, overtaken at the headquarters level and the field level and the agent level with these other people with different standards, different ways of operating. Not that that was bad, but different credibility, different ethics, and it was more than I could handle. So I'm so lucky that I got out of there with a promotion. I mean, if I got out of there later- ally, I would have been happy."

In 1968, at the urging of FDA Commissioner Goddard, President Johnson merged the two agencies to create the Bureau of Narcotics and Dangerous Drugs.

== See also ==
- List of United States federal law enforcement agencies
