= Herbert L. Ley Jr. =

Commissioner of the Food and Drug Administration

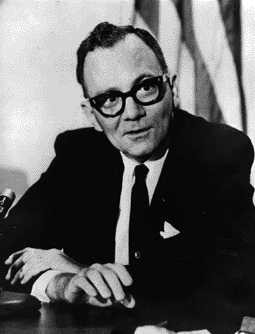

9th Commissioner of Food and Drugs
- In office July 1, 1968 – December 12, 1969
- President: Lyndon B. Johnson; Richard Nixon
- Preceded by: James L. Goddard
- Succeeded by: Charles C. Edwards

Personal details
- Born: September 7, 1923 Columbus, Ohio, U.S.
- Died: July 22, 2001 (aged 77) Rockville, Maryland, U.S.
- Party: Independent
- Children: 2
- Education: Harvard University

Herbert Leonard Ley Jr. (September 7, 1923 – July 22, 2001) was an American physician and the 9th Commissioner and head of the U.S. Food and Drug Administration (FDA).

== Background ==
Dr. Ley attended Harvard College from 1941 to 1943, and returned there after World War II, where he received his M.D. degree, cum laude, in 1946. In 1951, he earned a Master of Public Health degree from the Harvard School of Public Health. From 1951 until 1958, he worked with the Army Medical Service Graduate School in rickettsial disease research, the Office of the Surgeon General, and as an epidemiologist in Korea and Vietnam.

In 1958, he accepted a position as Professor of Bacteriology and Chairman of the Department of Bacteriology, Hygiene, and Preventive Medicine at George Washington University. In 1963, he was appointed Associate Professor of Epidemiology and Microbiology at the Harvard School of Public Health, and became chairman of the Department in 1964.

== FDA ==
In September 1966, Ley took a leave of absence from his position to become director of the Bureau of Medicine of the Food and Drug Administration and on July 1, 1968, he was appointed Commissioner of the Food and Drug Administration by President Lyndon B. Johnson. Ley served as FDA commissioner for only a year and a half; he was ousted in December 1969.

His three years at the FDA came during the time when the FDA grew from an insignificant agency to the key agency protecting consumers; during that time 300 drugs were removed from the market. After he left, Ley stated that he had "constant, tremendous, sometimes unmerciful pressure" from the drug industry and that the drug company lobbyists, combined with the politicians who worked on behalf of their patrons, could bring "tremendous pressure" to bear on him and his staff, to try preventing FDA restrictions on their drugs. Ley complained that his agency faced budget shortfalls and lacked support from the Department of Health, Education, and Welfare and Congress; Ley was on the master list of Nixon political opponents.

An example of the clashes the FDA had with pressure groups, involved the drug company Upjohn and their patented drug Panalba. Panalba was a combination of tetracycline, an inexpensive and effective generic drug, with novobiocin, a more toxic antibacterial with a different spectrum of activity. Although Upjohn had been marketing the drug for 7 years, they had not done any of the required studies on the efficacy of it and so the FDA under Ley moved to decertify it. Ley met tremendous opposition from Upjohn.

The highest profile issue that Ley had to confront was sodium cyclamate. An artificial sweetener, it was originally brought to market as a flavoring ingredient in drugs, but in 1958, it was designated GRAS (generally recognized as safe) and its uses expanded, first into table sugars, then into many foods. By 1969 annual sales of cyclamate had reached $1 billion. However, by that time some animal studies had shown that very high doses of cyclamates, at levels of humans ingesting 350 cans of diet soda per day, led to higher rates of bladder cancer in rats. Amidst the growth of the environmental movement and its concern with chemicals, pressure mounted on the government to restrict the use of cyclamate. In October 1969, Department of Health, Education & Welfare Secretary Robert Finch bypassed Ley and the FDA, and removed the GRAS designation from cyclamate, banning its use in general purpose foods but keeping it available for restricted use in dietary products with additional labeling. In October 1970, a year after Ley left, the FDA banned cyclamate completely from all food and drug products in the United States.

Dr. Ley was ousted from his Commissioner post on December 12, 1969, and was replaced by Charles C. Edwards.

=== Reviews of his tenure ===
In accepting Ley's resignation, Secretary of HEW Finch praised him as a "gifted scientist and a dedicated public servant," saying that he had "coped strenuously with an unwieldy agency".

In September 1982, interviewed for the oral history program of the FDA History Office, Maurice D. Kinslow, Chairman of the committee and author of the final draft of the July 1969 "Kinslow report" characterized Dr. Ley as Commissioner: "Since I reported to him [Dr. Ley] as a District Director and subsequently took on the special assignment [Kinslow Report], I had a lot of personal contact with him. I found him to be a very honest, decent person to work for. I respect Herb Ley; he was very different that either George P. Larrick or James L. Goddard [Previous FDA Commissioners], but I'm convinced he was dedicated to the best interests of the American public. And indeed, I believe that he got into significant trouble during his last days in the agency during the fall of 1969, in connection with the banning of cyclamates because he did what the Secretary told him to do (to not discuss the matter within the FDA). He was a good soldier."

== After the FDA ==
After his resignation, in an interview to the New York Times, Dr. Ley warned the public about the FDA's inability to safeguard consumers. People were being misled, he believed "The thing that bugs me is that the people think the FDA is protecting them - it isn't. What the FDA is doing and what the public thinks it's doing are as different as night and day," he said.

On December 15, 1999, interviewed for the oral history program of the FDA History Office, Dr. Ley shared that from the first controversy in his tenure as FDA Commissioner he had a "gut feeling" that his life expectancy at the FDA was probably limited. He attributed this to the administration wishing that he would "stonewall" an National Academy of Sciences report supporting removal from the market of many pharmaceutical products that had been approved between 1938 and 1962 based without proof of efficacy, and that his failure to do so adversely affected the financial interests of the pharmaceutical industry.

Dr. Herbert L. Ley Jr died of cardiovascular disease on July 22, 2001, at his home in Rockville, Maryland. He was 77. Survivors include two children from his first marriage, and a sister.
