= Charles C. Edwards =

American physician

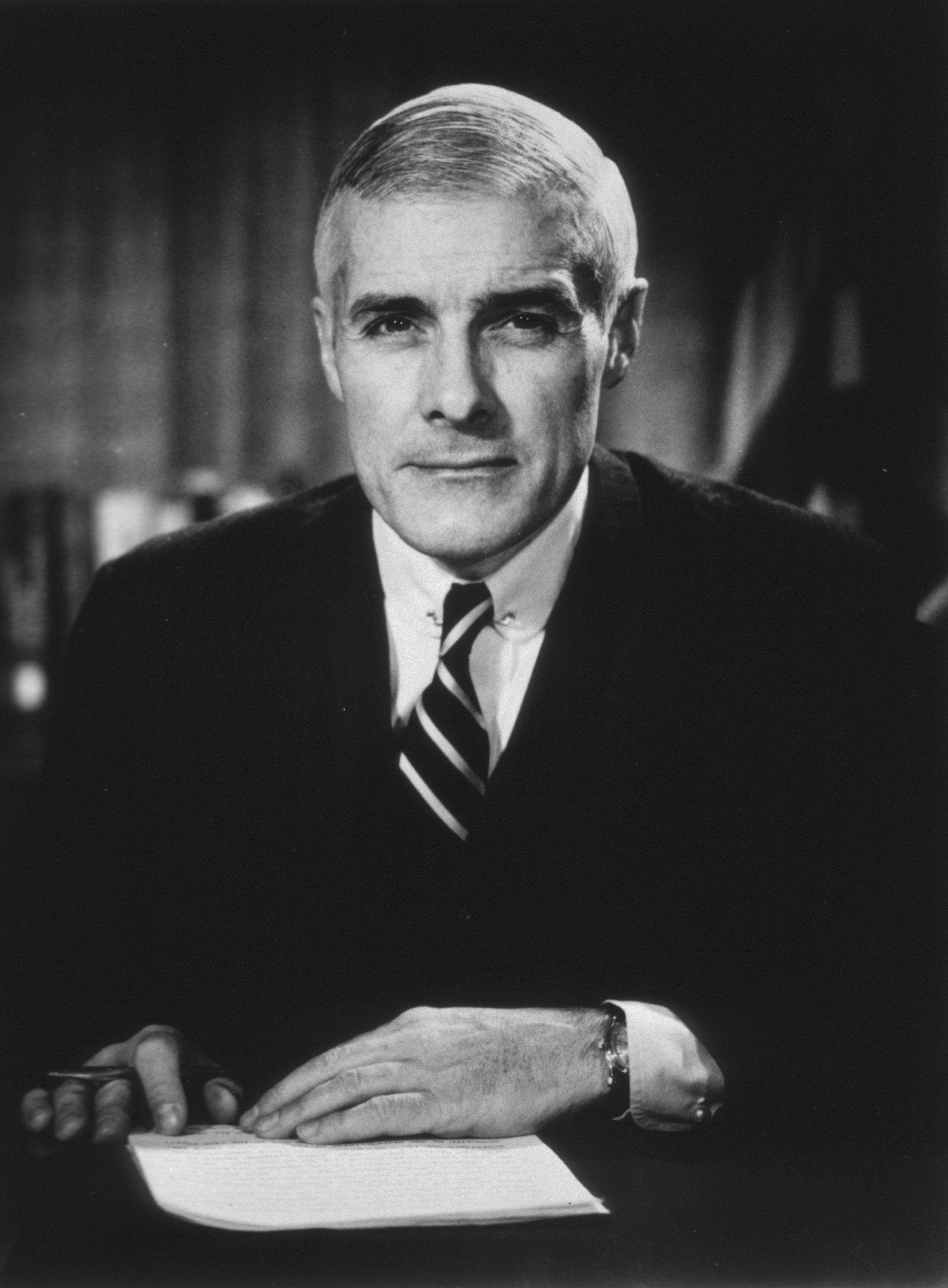

4th United States Assistant Secretary for Health
- In office April 18, 1973 – January 5, 1975
- President: Richard Nixon; Gerald Ford
- Preceded by: Merlin K. DuVal
- Succeeded by: Theodore Cooper

10th Commissioner of Food and Drugs
- In office December 13, 1969 – March 15, 1973
- President: Richard Nixon
- Preceded by: Herbert L. Ley Jr.
- Succeeded by: Alexander M. Schmidt

Personal details
- Born: September 16, 1923 Overton, Nebraska, US
- Died: August 7, 2011 (aged 87) San Diego, California, US
- Party: Republican

Charles C. Edwards (September 16, 1923 – August 7, 2011) was an American physician who served as Commissioner of Food and Drugs from 1969 to 1973 and as the United States Assistant Secretary for Health from 1973 to 1975. He died on August 7, 2011, in San Diego, California at age 87.
