= John Finlator =

American federal administrator (1911–1990)

John H. Finlator
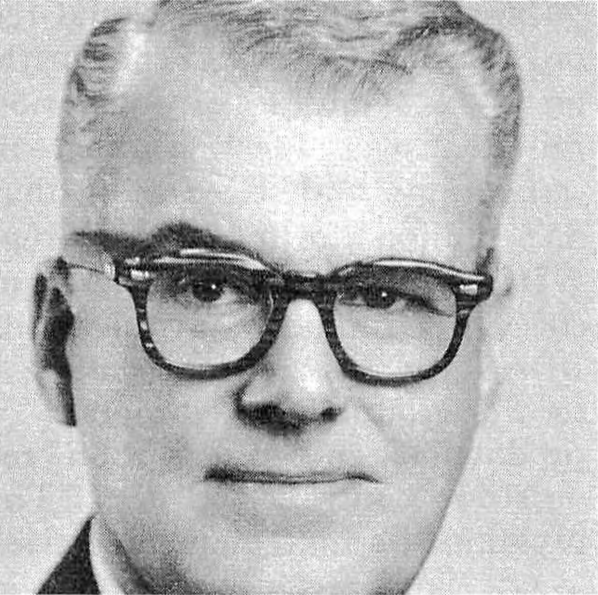

Director Bureau of Drug Abuse Control
- In office March 7, 1966 – April 8, 1968
- Appointed by: President Lyndon B. Johnson; Commissioner James L. Goddard
- Succeeded by: Self

Deputy Director Bureau of Narcotics and Dangerous Drugs
- In office April 8, 1968 – January 1, 1972
- Appointed by: Attorney General Ramsey Clark

Personal details
- Born: 1911 Louisburg, North Carolina
- Died: August 17, 1990 (aged 78) Alexandria, Virginia
- Resting place: National Memorial Park
- Spouse: Florence Boon Finlator
- Awards: *Henry Manfredi Award, BNDD; *Distinguished Service Award, Department of Health, Education and Welfare

John Haywood Finlator was an American federal administrator and narcotics law enforcement director. He was the first and only director of the Bureau of Drug Abuse Control (BDAC), and later served as deputy director of the Bureau of Narcotics and Dangerous Drugs (BNDD). He was one of the first members of the narcotics enforcement community that advocated for decriminalizing cannabis and marijuana. This advocacy often set him at odds with his coworkers at the bureau and with Congress but was praised by many medical community members.

== Early life ==
Finlator was born in 1911 in Louisburg, North Carolina. He earned a bachelor's degree in history and economics from North Carolina State University, and a master's degree in management from American University. He was a member of the Cosmos Club and the Sons of the American Revolution.

== Career in public service ==
In 1937, Finlator became a postal clerk for the United States Post Office Department in North Carolina. At some point, Finlator worked as an investigator for the Civil Service Commission. At some point, Finlator was appointed to be the Director of the Office of Manpower Administration for the General Services Administration.

In 1941, Finlator moved to Washington, D.C. and joined the State Department, where he worked administrative jobs. By 1954, Finlator was the Executive Officer for the State Department's Office of Security, and the Acting Chief of that office's Division of Investigations.

=== Director of the Bureau of Drug Abuse Control ===
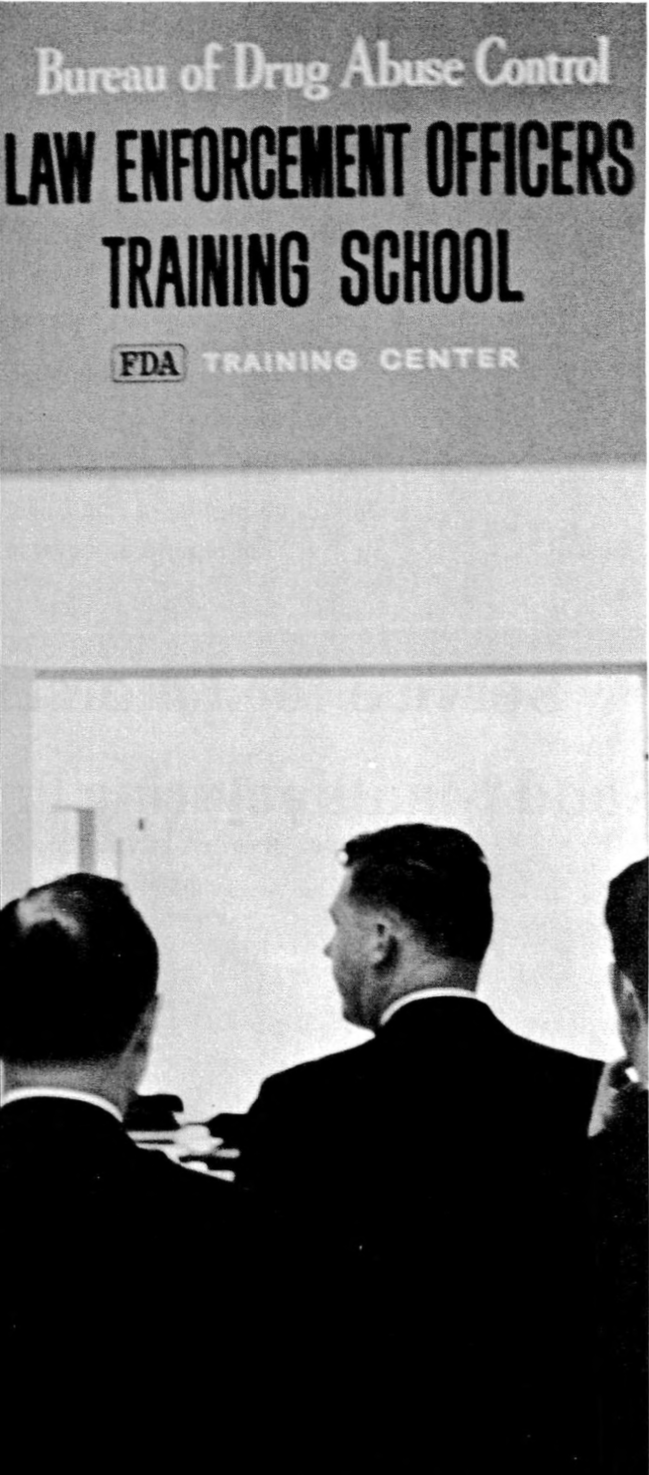
John Finlator and Kenneth Durrin waiting for a new class of BDAC recruits.

On March 7, 1966, Finlator was appointed the first Director of the BDAC by Dr. James L. Goddard. Finlator served as the first and only director of the bureau. Officially, Finlator spoke against marijuana, and in favor of convictions while in this office.

There was a differentiation between the Federal Bureau of Narcotics (FBN) and the BDAC here: FBN had jurisdiction over narcotics such as marijuana, cocaine, opium, and their derivatives. BDAC had jurisdiction over those other drugs that were considered "dangerous drugs", including LSD and hallucinogenics. Marijuana was not in Finlator's remit or vested enumerated power to pursue, and vice-versa, the FBN did not pursue LSD. However, charges in LSD arrests made by BDAC incidentally sometimes included charges of possession of marijuana. Finlator also wrote that marijuana would often be laced with LSD, confusing the jurisdictional pursuit of LSD. Under Finlator's leadership, the BDAC seized millions of units of hallucinogenic drugs, most of it LSD.

Finlator's BDAC clashed against the culture of the FBN, because his approach was a nontraditional law enforcement approach which he called the "statistical-psychological-educational" approach. This model defined the structure of BDAC and its three branches, and the modus of the basic BDAC operations. Finlator wanted an agency that stood apart from the FBN here, in that he wanted to treat drug addiction as a medical issue, and direct his agency to study and work with doctors and the medical community to address the roots of the problems that result in addiction. In sum, BDAC treated addicts like people - while the FBN treated addicts as deviants who should be prosecuted with the full force of the law.

Finlator came to BDAC with a different approach than most other cops was because he was not a cop, and he did not have a background in law enforcement. Finlator was a "soft spoken" administrator, but he originally gained the respect of the policing community because he looked the part and was able to secure convictions. BDAC was also not a traditional law enforcement unit - it belonged to the FDA, which came with a medical approach to drugs and not a police approach.

=== Bureau of Narcotics and Dangerous Drugs ===
On April 8, 1968, Finlator was re-delegated by Attorney General Ramsey Clark to the position of assistant director of the newly established Bureau of Narcotics and Dangerous Drugs (BNDD), where he would keep his pay and grade. He was transferred on the same day as Henry Giordano, the Commissioner of the FBN. Finlator was later promoted to deputy director of the agency.

On January 1, 1972, Finlator tendered his resignation. He resigned at 60 years of age, and 57 was the mandatory retirement age for most federal law enforcement employees. However, the press of the day reported that he quit the job over his disagreements with marijuana legislation.

== Advisory Board of NORML ==
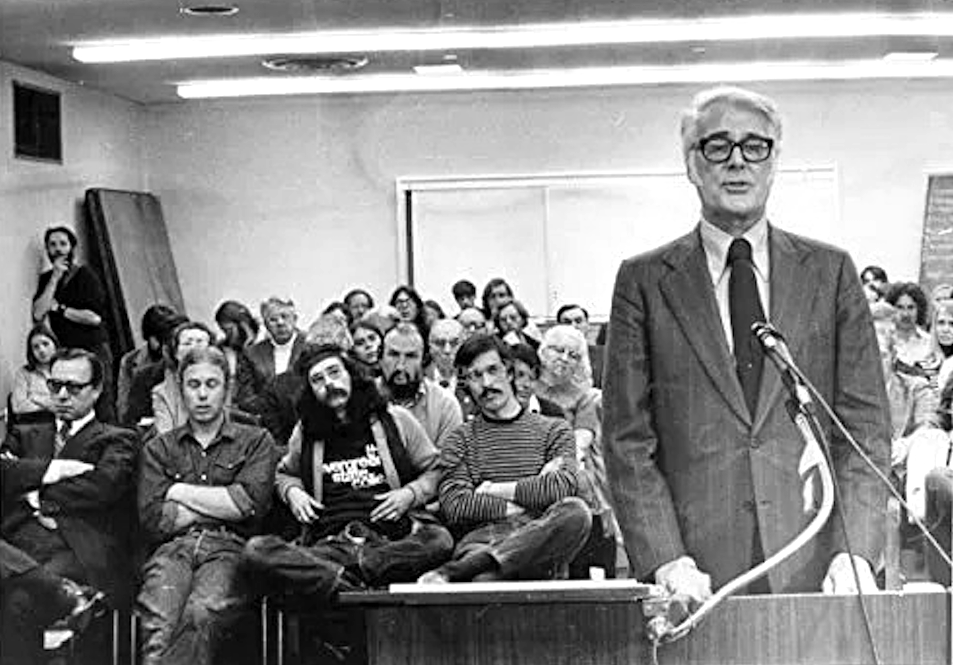
John Finlator testifies for marijuana reform before the Senate and House Judiciary Committees in 1973.

Before Finlator officially retired, he had given several speeches and public notices on his opinion that marijuana should be decriminalized. Keith Stroup, the founding director of the National Organization for the Reform of Marijuana Laws (NORML) contacted Finlator and asked him if he would like to join. Finlator told him to call back after he was no longer serving in the federal government.

On the same evening after Finlator tendered his resignation, he received a telephone call from Stroup asking him again to join the founding advisory board of the nascent pro-reform organization. Finlator agreed, officially joining the advisory board. He was referred to as part of the "traveling road show," by the organization, testifying before state and local governments across the country as a key witness for decriminalization. He also represented the organization in Washington.

Stroup writes of his interactions with Finlator in the early days of NORML:

"Finlator seemed to enjoy the surprise on people's faces when he testified in favor of marihuana decriminalization... I offered Finlator marijuana on several occasions, when we were spending a night in some hotel on the road waiting to testify the next day before some state legislature, but he always laughed and declined. Those of us who smoked would often meet in my room and share a joint before dinner, where Finlator and Whipple would join us and make jokes about our being stoned. They, of course, enjoyed a cocktail or two with dinner."

== Retirement and later life ==
In 1973, Finlator wrote the book The Drugged Nation: A Narc's story. Later he wrote several works of poetry.

Finlator lived in Arlington, Virginia for 44 years. He served as President of the Arlington Kiwanis Club and chairman of the Arlington Red Cross. He also served on the Arlington Salvation Army board and the Hospice of Northern Virginia. He was a member of Clarendon United Methodist Church in Arlington.

On August 17, 1990, Finlator died of cancer at the Hermitage Health Center in Alexandria, Virginia.
