= Alexander M. Schmidt =

American physician (1930–1991)

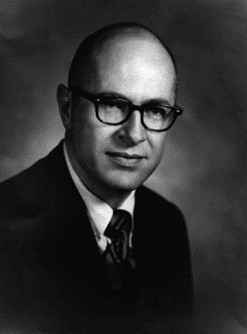
- Schmidt in 1973

11th Commissioner of Food and Drugs
- In office July 20, 1973 – November 30, 1976
- President: Richard Nixon; Gerald Ford
- Preceded by: Charles C. Edwards
- Succeeded by: Donald Kennedy

Personal details
- Born: January 26, 1930 Jamestown, North Dakota
- Died: January 28, 1991 (aged 61) Oak Park, Illinois
- Party: Republican

Alexander M. Schmidt (January 26, 1930 – January 28, 1991) was an American physician who served as Commissioner of Food and Drugs from 1973 to 1976.

He died of coronary artery disease on January 28, 1991, in Oak Park, Illinois, at age 61.
