= Andrew C. Tartaglino =

US Drug Enforcement Administration official

Andrew Charles Tartaglino
- Born: January 28, 1926; Newport, Rhode Island, U.S.
- Died: November 21, 1997 (Aged 71); Baltimore, Maryland, U.S.
- Resting place: Arlington National Cemetery
- Education: United States Merchant Marine Academy
- Alma mater: Georgetown University
- Occupation: Government official
- Spouses: Doris E. Deipser; Peggy Ollinger
- Children: 3 sons
- Parent: Eugene Tartaglino

Andrew C. Tartaglino (January 28, 1926 – November 21, 1997) was an American federal government official. He served as the deputy chief of the United States Drug Enforcement Administration (USDEA).

== Early life ==
Andrew C. Tartaglino was born on January 28, 1926, in Newport, Rhode Island. His father was Eugene Tartaglino.

Tartaglino was educated at the United States Merchant Marine Academy, and he served in the United States Merchant Marine during World War II. He graduated from Georgetown University in 1949. He served in the United States Navy during the Korean War.

== Career ==
Tartaglino joined the Federal Bureau of Narcotics in 1952. He first served in New York, where he helped get Elmer "Trigger" Burke arrested in 1954. He later served in Italy and France, where he helped arrest Mauricio Claudio Rosal, the Guatemalan Ambassador to Belgium, who was "caught smuggling 100 pounds of heroin into New York from France". He subsequently worked for the United States Department of the Treasury.

Tartaglino served as chief inspector of the Bureau of Narcotics and Dangerous Drugs, only to be promoted as deputy director of operations. In 1967, he argued that 75% of heroin used in the United States came from France. By 1971, he admitted he hired intelligence operatives on foreign land to curtail the illegal drug trade, in conjunction with foreign governments. Back in the United States, Tartaglino oversaw the arrest of 39 employees of Strasenburgh Prescription Products, a subsidiary of the Philadelphia-based Pennwalt Corporation, for exporting amphetamine tablets to its Mexican subsidiary, Laboratorios Strasenburgh de Mexico, which were later sold in the U.S. states of New Mexico, Texas, Oklahoma, Tennessee, Alabama, Louisiana, Florida, Kentucky, Georgia, Colorado, Mississippi and Arkansas, under the brand name of Bifetamina. During the arrest, 1 million tablets for a market value of US$1.5 million were also seized. The arrest became known as "Operation Blackjack".

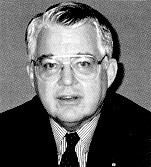
John R. Bartels, Jr

Tartaglino served as deputy chief of the United States Drug Enforcement Administration from 1973 to 1975. He resigned upon accusing DEA official John R. Bartels, Jr. of covering up for another DEA official allegedly involved with prostitution and drug-dealing.

Tartaglino joined the United States Department of Justice as a liaison to Interpol in 1975. He subsequently worked as an investigator for the United States House Committee on Ethics. In the 1980s, Tartaglino investigated Medicaid fraud for the Attorney General of Maryland. He subsequently worked for the United States Senate Committee on the Judiciary.

== Personal life and death ==
Tartaglino married Doris E. Deipser in 1955. They had three sons, Andrew C. "Drew" Tartaglino Jr., Frederick R. Tartaglino, and Stephen D. Tartaglino. They later divorced, and he married Peggy Ollinger.

Tartaglino died of prostate cancer on November 21, 1997, in Baltimore, Maryland. His funeral was held at the Cathedral of Mary Our Queen, and he was buried at the Arlington National Cemetery.
