= Bureau of Narcotics and Dangerous Drugs =

Former U.S. Department of Justice narcotics enforcement bureau

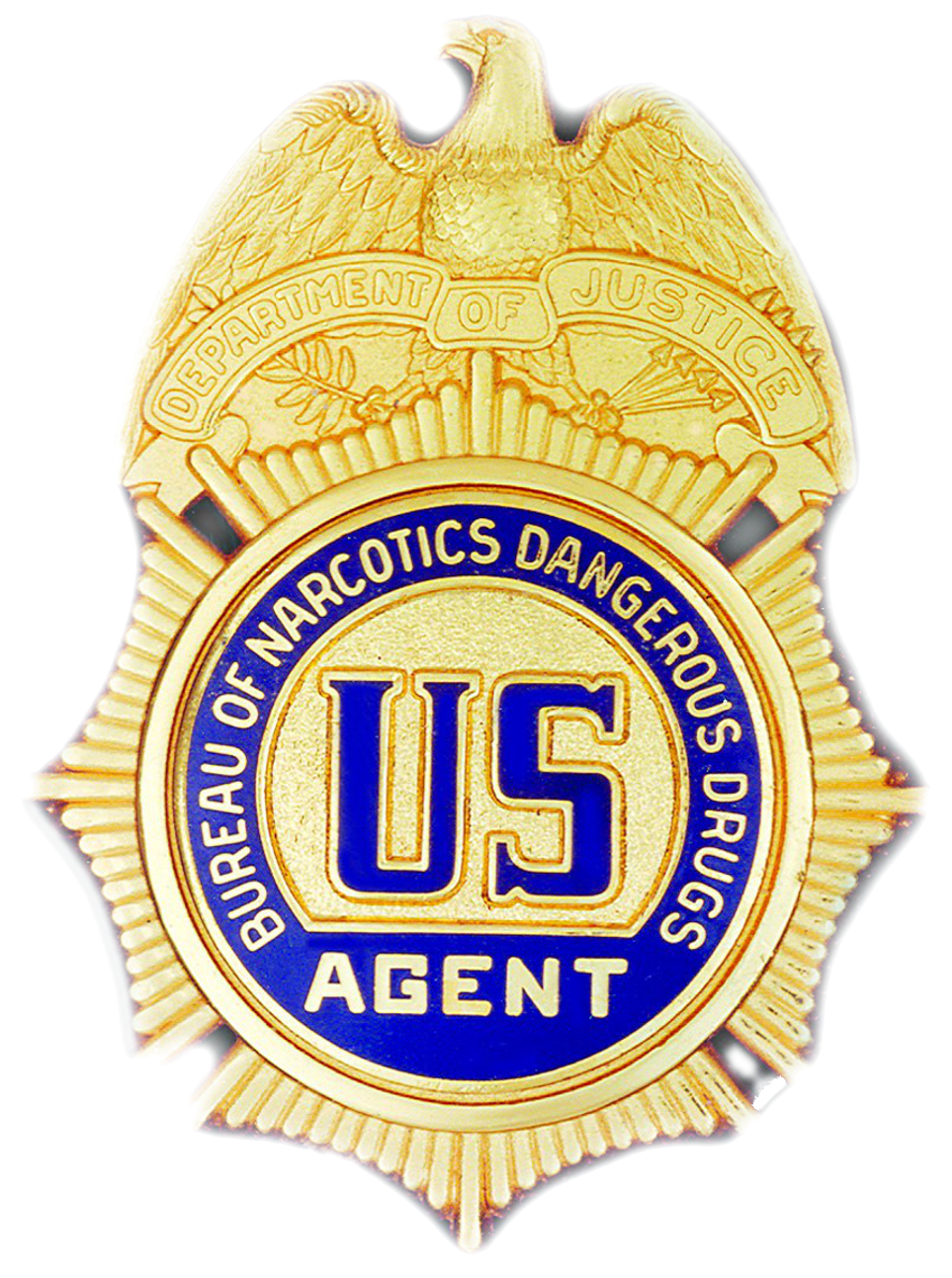

Agency overview
- Formed: April 8, 1968
- Preceding agencies: Federal Bureau of Narcotics; Bureau of Drug Abuse Control
- Dissolved: July 1, 1973
- Superseding agency: Drug Enforcement Administration

Jurisdictional structure
- Operations jurisdiction: United States of America

Operational structure
- Agency executive: John Ingersoll, Director, August 1, 1968
- Parent agency: Department of Justice

Facilities
- Fixed wing aircraft: 24

The Bureau of Narcotics and Dangerous Drugs (BNDD) was a federal law enforcement agency within the United States Department of Justice with the enumerated power of investigating the consumption, trafficking, and distribution of narcotics and dangerous drugs. The BNDD is the direct predecessor of the modern Drug Enforcement Administration (DEA).

== History ==
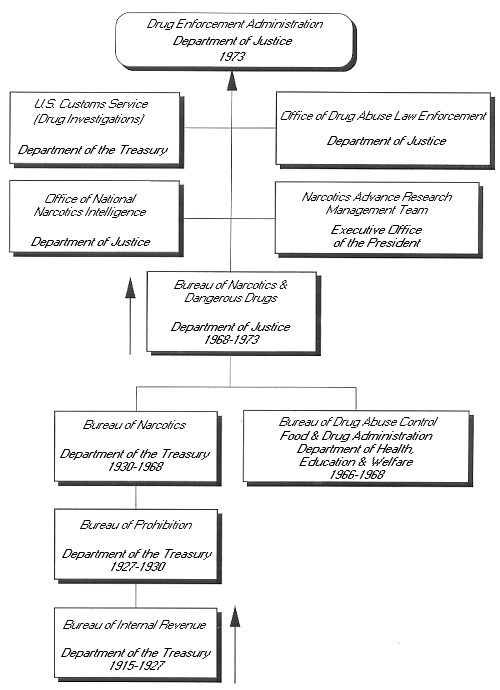
The Bureau of Narcotic and Dangerous Drugs directly preceded the Drug Enforcement Administration.

BNDD agent trainees at the BNDD's Washingtonian academy, in 1969.

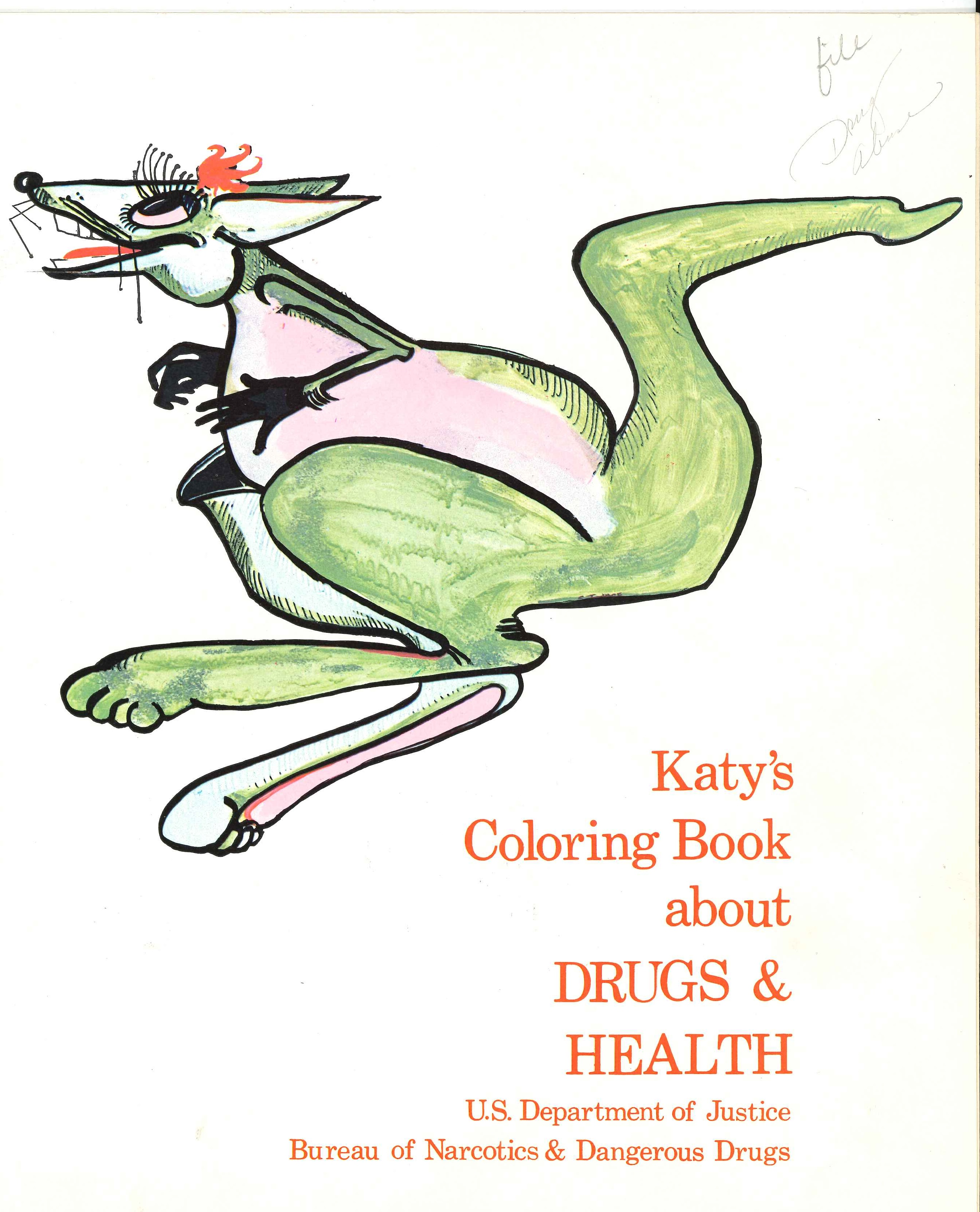
Drug abuse coloring book, 1974

=== Merging the old guard ===
Prior to the creation of the BNDD, there were two law enforcement agencies dedicated to narcotics enforcement: the Federal Bureau of Narcotics (FBN) and the Bureau of Drug Abuse Control (BADC). These bureaus were organizationally within the structure of the Department of the Treasury and the Food and Drug Administration.

On February 7, 1968, President Lyndon B. Johnson wrote to Congress;

“This administration and this congress have the will and the determination to stop the illicit traffic in drugs. But we need more than the will and the determination. We need a modern and efficient instrument to transform our plans into action.”

This official executive request of the legislature was called Reorganization Plan #1. The text of the plan laid out the mission that the new BNDD would;

1. Consolidate the authority and preserve the experience and manpower of the Bureau of Narcotics and Bureau of Drug Abuse Control;
2. Work with state and local governments in their crackdown on illegal trade in drugs and narcotics, and help to train local agents and investigators;
3. Maintain worldwide operations, working closely with other nations, to suppress the trade in illicit narcotics and marijuana;
4. Conduct an extensive campaign of research and a nation-wide public education program on drug abuse and its tragic effects.

Reorganization Plan #1 was passed by both houses of congress on April 7, 1968, and became effective the following day.

The BNDD was established on April 8, 1968. The new BNDD, as detailed in the plan, took the enforcement powers of Treasury and the FDA and transferred them to the singular Department of Justice, under the authority of the United States attorney general.

=== John Ingersoll ===
John Ingersoll was the first director of the BNDD, being appointed on August 1, 1968, and its last. He departed the bureau in disgruntlement on June 29, 1973, and the bureau was merged into the new DEA two days later.

Ingersoll's timeline of tenure as the head of the BNDD is similar to his two main predecessors in federal narcotics enforcement;

- Levi Nutt was the deputy commissioner of the Narcotics Division from 1919 to 1930 - the entire length of its existence, leaving the new Bureau of Narcotics in scandal before it was taken over by Harry Anslinger.
- Harry Anslinger was the commissioner of the FBN from 1930 to 1965 - the FBN was merged into the BNDD only three years after his departure, in 1968.

=== Elvis Presley becomes a federal agent ===
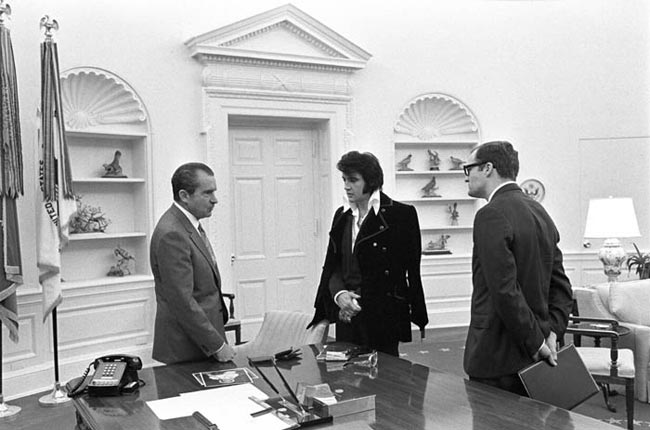
Elvis and Nixon discussing with Bud Krogh how Elvis could obtain BNDD credentials, and what Elvis could do to assist narcotics enforcement, December 21, 1970.

Elvis Presley, the famous "king" of rock and roll, had been on a campaign to collect a badge from every police department in the country, but the one that he desired most was the badge of a BNDD Federal Agent at Large. Ingersoll insisted that in order for anyone to obtain a badge from the BNDD, they would need to be credentialed as a federal agent, take the oath of office, and agree to a training program. Federal Agent at Large was a position that had only existed once before in the entire history of narcotics enforcement, and it had belonged to George Hunter White.

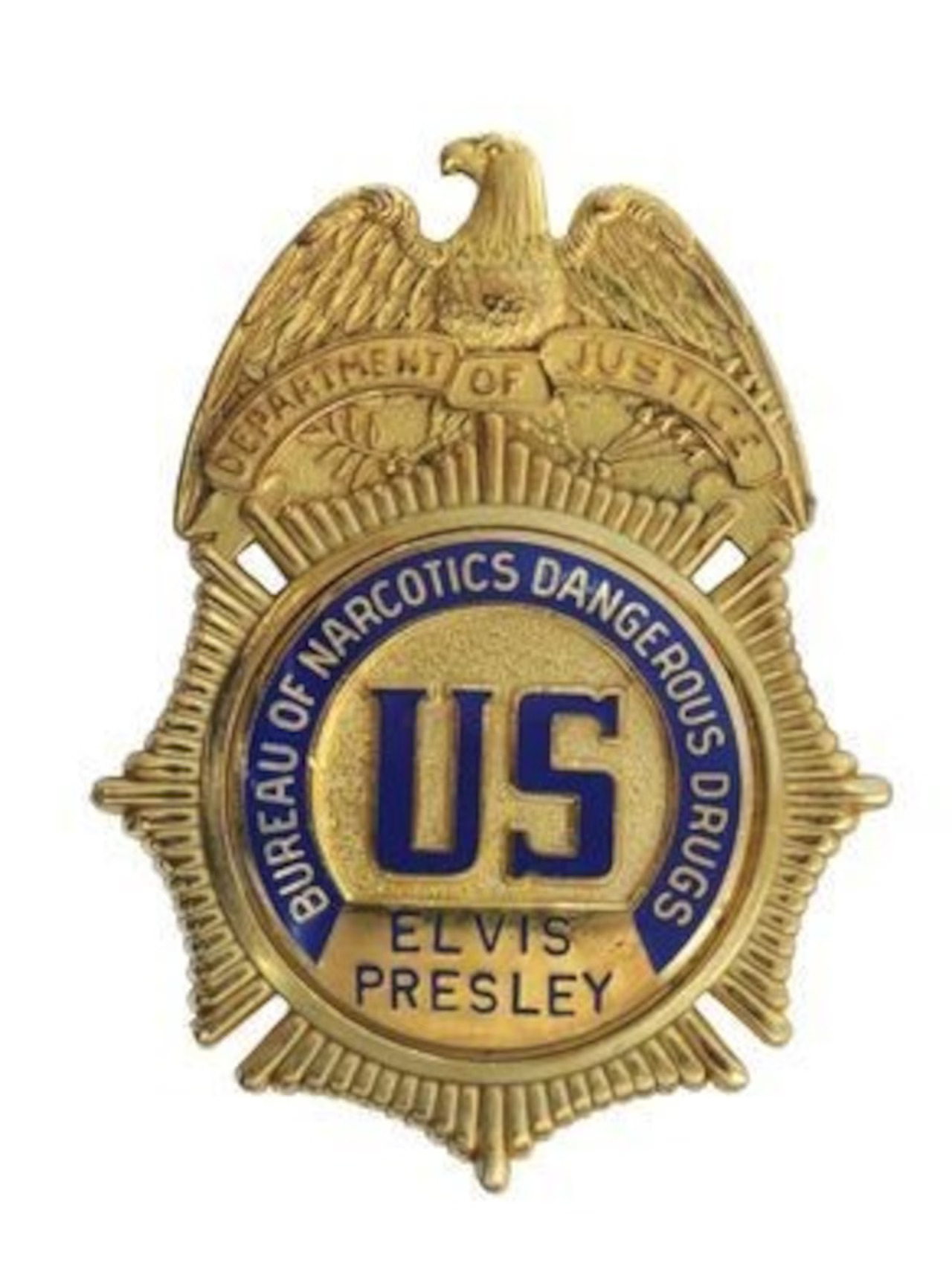
BNDD Badge belonging to Elvis Presley.

Upon hearing the news that Elvis had initiated a meeting with Nixon, Haldeman replied in the margins of Bud Krogh's memo with a single sentence: "You must be kidding." When Elvis did meet Nixon, he mentioned that he could infiltrate any group of "hippies or young people," and had "studied communist brainwashing and the drug culture."

After Deputy Director of the BNDD John Finlator had initially denied Elvis's request for a BNDD badge, he informed Elvis that "his original decision had been changed by the President." Instead of the position of federal agent at large, Elvis was presented with an equally unique badge. This badge did not declare him an agent, a special agent, a supervisor, or a director. Instead, the badge declared that he was "Elvis Presley." This badge became one of Elvis's most prized possessions, and he would carry it in a leather wallet everywhere he went for the rest of his life.

=== Ingersoll launches internal investigations ===
By 1970, Ingersoll suspected that the old Federal Bureau of Narcotics (FBN) was notoriously corrupt, and that this corruption had carried over to the new BNDD. In December 1970, Ingersoll requested the assistance of Central Intelligence Agency (CIA) director Richard Helms in rooting it out.

In January 1971, Helms approved a program of "covert recruitment and security clearance support to BNDD".

The investigation, and many following investigations, prove that Ingersoll was not wrong in many of his suspicions. Evidence exists today that;

- FBN supervisory agent at large George Hunter White had extrajudicially killed several of his suspects during investigations. While White had retired in 1966, he still had many connections at the BNDD.
- White's primary undercover operative after 1948, Jacques Voignier, was an operative for the FBN while simultaneously running drugs for the Corsican Brotherhood and running cons for his own personal gain. Voignier was arrested in 1969, the year after the establishment of the BNDD.
- FBN Agent Dean Unkefer admits in a memoir released in 2015 to having been addicted to narcotics within only a few years of his recruitment into the organization, despite never having done them before joining the bureau.

== Activities ==
=== Foreign offices ===
By 1970, the BNDD had nine foreign offices:

- Italy
- Turkey
- Panama
- Hong Kong
- Vietnam
- Thailand
- Mexico
- France
- Colombia

=== New York Task Force ===
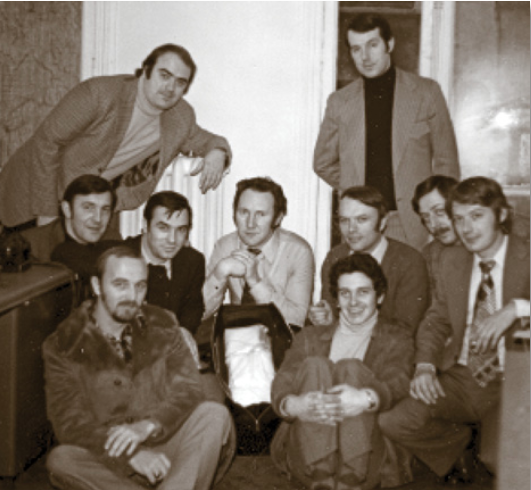
BNDD special agents with French narcotics agents of OCRTIS in Paris, 1973

The first federal narcotics task force was established in 1970 in New York City.

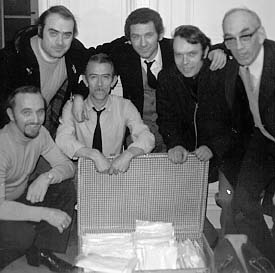
The same agents asked Commissioner Le Mouël to join the photo.

=== French Connection ===
The BNDD carried on the work of the FBN in investigating the French Connection. In 1967, BNDD Deputy Director Andrew Tartaglino declared that: "France has been identified as the source of more than 75% of the heroin consumed by our drug addicts." Most of those narcotics transactions were being controlled from the city of Marseilles, where there was an established power base in the Marseilles mafia - an extension of Union Corse. The BNDD worked closely with French narcotics agents of the Office Central pour la Répression du Trafic Illicite des Stupéfiants (OCRTIS) to investigate the Corsican Mafia, Union Corse, and the Corsican Brotherhood in their dominance of the European narcotics trade. This effort was successful, and the French Connection was completely dismantled by 1974.

However, French historian Andrew Merchant writes that the narcotics trade which had so successfully interrupted by the BNDD and the OCRTIS in "Franco-American cooperation," by 1981 was now no longer centralized within a few families, but had become a drugs milieu, where there was already a present crimes milieu. This is a result of what he calls the rise of the "user-dealer."

=== Air Wing ===
In 1971, Special Agent Marion Joseph, a former US Air Force pilot, noted that "a single plane could do the work of five agents in five cars on the ground," and he bought one plane with an allocated BNDD budget of $58,000. The Bureau did not have enough funds to purchase a new aircraft, so he bought one under the United States Air Force Bailment Property Transfer Program. It was a surplus Air Force Cessna Skymaster that had been used in the Vietnam War. The experimental program grew quickly, and by 1973, the BNDD had 41 Special Agent/Pilots and a fleet of 24 aircraft - mostly single engine, piston driven, fixed-wing aircraft.

=== Personnel ===
In 1971, the BNDD was composed of 1,500 agents and had a budget of some $43 million (which was more than fourteen times the size of the budget of the former Federal Bureau of Narcotics).

== Dissolution ==
On July 1, 1973, the BNDD was merged into the newly formed Drug Enforcement Administration (DEA).

== See also ==
- United States v. Russell: U.S. Supreme Court case involving the Bureau.
- List of United States federal law enforcement agencies
- Comprehensive Drug Abuse Prevention and Control Act
