= George P. Larrick =

Commissioner of the Food and Drug Administration

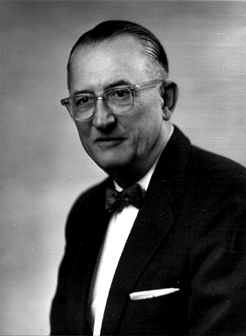

7th Commissioner of Food and Drugs
- In office August 12, 1954 – December 27, 1965
- President: Dwight D. Eisenhower; John F. Kennedy; Lyndon B. Johnson
- Preceded by: Charles W. Crawford
- Succeeded by: James L. Goddard

Personal details
- Born: November 19, 1901 Springfield, Ohio, U.S.
- Died: August 11, 1968 (aged 66) Washington, D.C., U.S.
- Party: Republican
- Education: Wittenberg College; Ohio State University

George P. Larrick (November 19, 1901 – August 11, 1968) was Commissioner of the U.S. Food and Drug Administration (FDA) from 1954–1965.

== Early life ==
George P. Larrick was born on November 19, 1901, in Springfield, Ohio. He worked his way through two years at Wittenberg College from 1919–1921, and then took a pre-medical course at Ohio State University from 1921–1923. In 1923, he accepted a "temporary job" as a food and drug inspector in Cincinnati, Ohio. Fascinated with the work, he abandoned his medical aspirations, and successfully passed the competitive Civil Service examination for a permanent appointment. By 1930, he had been appointed senior food and drug inspector. In 1937, he was responsible for dispatching very nearly the entire field force of the FDA to track down remnants of the poisonous Elixir Sulfanilamide which killed 109 people, and highlighted the need for pre-market testing of new drugs. Larrick was also responsible for assembling an exhibit, dubbed by reporters, "The Chamber of Horrors," which effectively documented the need for a new federal food and drugs act. In 1939, following enactment of the new Food, Drug, and Cosmetic Act (1938), he was appointed Chief Inspector of the FDA. In addition to directing FDA investigations, he served as acting director of the Drug Division for a time, and early during World War II, assisted in the organization of the Procurement and Assignment Service of the Office of Defense, Health and Welfare Services.

== Commissioner of FDA ==
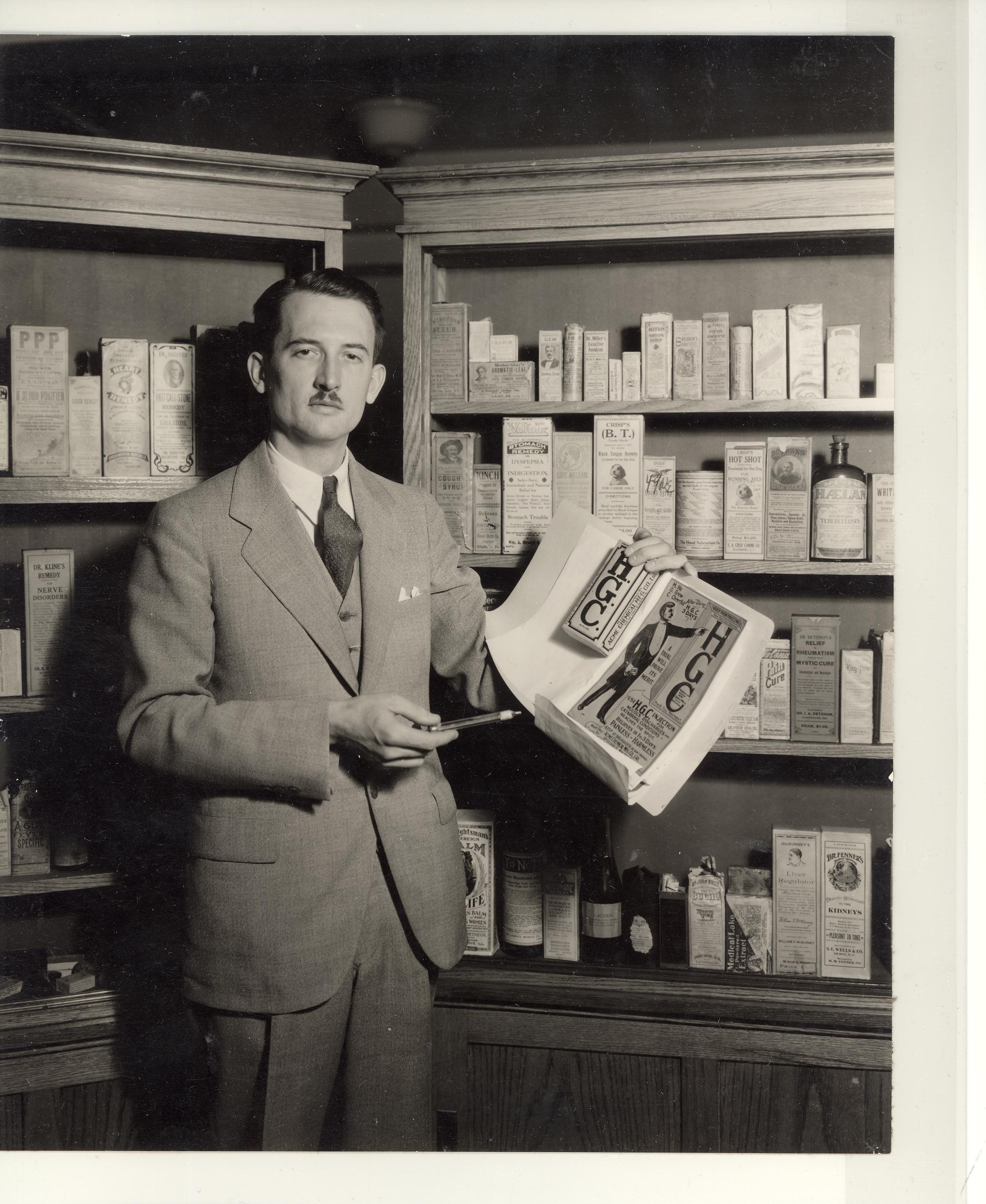
Larrick in the "American Chamber of Horrors"

Following the war, he served as Assistant Commissioner, Associate Commissioner and finally Deputy Commissioner of the FDA. In 1954, he was appointed Commissioner, succeeding Charles Crawford. Commissioner Larrick headed the FDA during the period of its greatest growth. In 1954, the Agency had less than 1,000 employees to regulate more than one fourth of the nation's commerce in consumer goods. The First Citizen's Advisory Committee report became the blueprint for extensive changes in the organization and a rapid increase in its resources. During Larrick's tenure, FDA appropriations increased more than tenfold, from $5 million to over $50 million, and its staff expanded to almost 4,000. The building program inaugurated during Larrick's administration provided modern laboratories for a majority of the FDA field districts and a $25 million headquarter's laboratory. His last official act was its dedication in December 1965.

Larrick was noted for his ability to maintain good relations with Congress, and major amendments began to transform the 1938 Act from a primarily punitive law to one designed to assure consumer protection by preventing violations. During Larrick's administration, however, the FDA came under strong criticism from some members of Congress. One of its strongest critics was Senator Hubert H. Humphrey, who accused the Agency of showing lax management, having ineffective leadership, of being slow moving, and of lagging in scientific work. Mr. Humphrey and others called for "new and dynamic leadership." Larrick counted among his friends, however, Representative John E. Fogarty, the powerful chairman of the House Appropriations Committee.

== Major projects ==
Larrick's administration oversaw the 1959 cranberry recall due to residues of the carcinogenic pesticide aminotriazole; the issuance of a public warning against the Hoxsey cancer treatment; legal actions against Krebiozen, another false cancer treatment; prohibition of thalidomide as a human teratogen in 1961; and the passage in 1962 of the Kefauver Harris Amendment ("Drug Efficacy Amendment") to the 1938 Act in response to the thalidomide affair. Attention was focused on drugs and the drug approval process, beginning with revelations that Henry Welch, the agency's chief of the Antibiotics Division, had accepted nearly one-quarter of a million dollars for editing private promotional journals in his field while passing judgement on the products in his position at FDA. Congressional investigations into thalidomide brought accusations that drug manufacturers had too easy access to regulators, and could thereby exert undue influence upon the review process. Although Larrick assured Congress that drug approvals had not been superficial, testimony was heard alleging that lay administrators were not really able to evaluate major drug review problems which were "all of a medical nature and exceedingly complex." Calls for Larrick's resignation were accentuated with recommendations that the next commissioner be a physician.

When Larrick announced his intentions to retire in 1965, John W. Gardner credited Larrick with great progress in administering the law, noting that "despite the twin handicaps of inadequate resources and inadequate legal authority, FDA has achieved remarkable success in its mission."

== After retirement ==
After he retired from active service, Larrick became a consultant on food and drug law and administration until he died. In this capacity, he made a study for the Pan American Health Organization on the feasibility of a central food and drug laboratory for South American countries. In 1955, the Drexel Institute of Technology conferred on him an honorary Doctorate of Science; and in 1968, he was recognized by the Association of Food and Drug Officials as a "catalyst who consistently brought about constructive change, and a skilled administrator in a field that requires experience, courage, respect for the rights of the regulated, and faith in the due process of law." Larrick died on August 11, 1968.
