= James L. Goddard =

American physician (1923–2009)

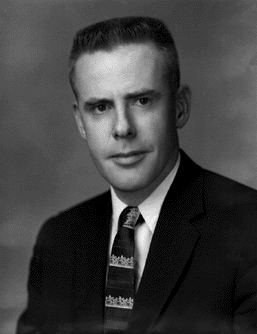

8th Commissioner of Food and Drugs
- In office January 17, 1966 – July 1, 1968
- President: Lyndon B. Johnson
- Preceded by: George P. Larrick
- Succeeded by: Herbert L. Ley Jr.

8th Director of the Communicable Disease Center
- In office 1962–1966
- President: John F. Kennedy; Lyndon B. Johnson
- Preceded by: Clarence A. Smith
- Succeeded by: David Sencer

Personal details
- Born: April 24, 1923 Alliance, Ohio, U.S.
- Died: December 18, 2009 (aged 86) Laguna Woods, California, U.S.
- Party: Democratic
- Education: George Washington University School of Medicine & Health Sciences (MD); Harvard University (MPH)

James L. Goddard (April 24, 1923 – December 18, 2009) was an American physician who served as the Director of the Communicable Disease Center from 1962 to 1966 and as Commissioner of Food and Drugs from 1966 to 1968. As commissioner, Goddard demoted Frances Oldham Kelsey from her position as Director of the Investigational Drug Branch.

He died of a brain hemorrhage on December 18, 2009, in Laguna Woods, California at age 86.
