= Brother's keeper =

Brother's keeper may refer to:

- "Brother's keeper", a Biblical phrase from William Tyndale's translation of the story of Cain and Abel

== Film ==
- Brother's Keeper (1992 film), an American documentary film
- Brother's Keeper (2002 film), an American television film directed by John Badham
- Brother's Keeper, a 2013 film featuring Michael Rooker
- Brother's Keeper (2014 film), a Nigerian film directed by Ikechukwu Onyeka
- Brother's Keeper (2021 film), a Turkish film

== Music ==
- Brother's Keeper (band), an American punk rock band
- Brother's Keeper, a band appearing on the compilation album Surfonic Water Revival
- Brother's Keeper (Neville Brothers album), 1990
- Brother's Keeper (Rich Mullins album), 1995
- "Brother's Keeper", a song by Anderson Paak from Oxnard
- "Brother's Keeper", a song by Basement from Promise Everything
- "Brother's Keeper", a song by DaBaby from My Brother's Keeper (Long Live G)
- "Brother's Keeper", a song by Firewind from Burning Earth

== Television ==
=== Series ===
- Brother's Keeper (1998 TV series), an American sitcom
- Brother's Keeper (2013 TV series), a Hong Kong television drama

=== Episodes ===
- "Brother's Keeper" (The Crow: Stairway to Heaven)
- "Brother's Keeper" (Dr. Quinn, Medicine Woman)
- "Brother's Keeper" (Fear the Walking Dead)
- "Brother's Keeper" (Heroes)
- "Brother's Keeper" (The Invisible Man)
- "Brother's Keeper" (Justified)
- "Brother's Keeper" (Knight Rider)
- "Brother's Keeper" (Law & Order)
- "Brother's Keeper" (Law & Order: Criminal Intent)
- "Brother's Keeper" (Miami Vice)
- "Brother's Keeper" (Mutant X)
- "Brother's Keeper" (The Nine)
- "Brother's Keeper" (Party of Five)
- "Brother's Keeper" (Prison Break)
- "Brother's Keeper" (Tru Calling)
- "Brother's Keeper" (Supernatural)

== Other uses ==
- Brothers Keepers (gang), a Canadian organized crime gang
- Brother's Keeper (software), a line of genealogy software
- Brother's Keeper, a book by Al Pickett and Chad Mitchell; basis for the 2021 film Under the Stadium Lights
- "Brother's Keeper", a 2003 episode of the radio series This American Life
- Brothers Keepers, a German-based anti-racism project
- Operation Brother's Keeper, an Israeli Defense Forces operation in response to the 2014 kidnapping of Israeli teens

== See also ==
- Brothers and Keepers, a 1984 memoir by John Edgar Wideman
- My Brother's Keeper (disambiguation)
- Her Brother's Keeper (disambiguation)
- His Brother's Keeper (disambiguation)
