= My Brother's Keeper =

My Brother's Keeper may refer to:

== Literature ==
- "My brother's keeper", a phrase from the biblical story of Cain and Abel
- My Brother's Keeper (Davenport novel), by Marcia Davenport
- My Brother's Keeper (Sheffield novel), by Charles Sheffield
- My Brother's Keeper, a 2005 novel by Patricia McCormick
- My Brother's Keeper, a book by Bo Gritz
- My Brother's Keeper, a book by Stanislaus Joyce, brother of James Joyce
- My Brother's Keeper, a series of Star Trek books by Michael Jan Friedman
- My Brother's Keeper, a comic book published by Spire Christian Comics
- My Brother's Keeper: A History of the American Jewish Joint Distribution Committee 1929–1939, a book by Yehuda Bauer
- My Brother's Keeper: A Memoir and a Message, a book by Amitai Etzioni
- My Brother's Keeper, a play by Nigel Williams

== Film and television ==
=== Film ===
- My Brother's Keeper (film), a 1948 British film starring Jack Warner
- My Brother's Keeper, a 1995 TV film featuring Ellen Burstyn
- My Brother's Keeper (Le Sang du frère), a 2004 film starring Christian Potenza
- My Brother's Keeper, a 2020 short film about the reunion of Guantanamo prisoner Mohamedou Ould Slahi and his former guard Steve Wood

=== Television ===
- My Brother's Keeper (British TV series), a 1975–1976 British sitcom
- My Brother's Keeper (South African TV series), a 2023–2025 telenovela
- "My Brother's Keeper" (Bonanza), a 1963 episode
- "My Brother's Keeper" (Danny Phantom), a 2004 episode
- "My Brother's Keeper" (ER), a 1998 episode
- "My Brother's Keeper" (Everwood), a 2003 episode
- "My Brother's Keeper" (The Fresh Prince of Bel-Air), a 1992 episode
- "My Brother's Keeper" (G.I. Joe: A Real American Hero), a 1986 episode
- "My Brother's Keeper" (Gunsmoke), a 1971 episode
- "My Brother's Keeper" (Lucifer), a 2018 episode
- "My Brother's Keeper" (NCIS: New Orleans), a 2015 episode
- "My Brother's Keeper" (Patience), a 2025 episode
- "My Brother's Keeper" (The Punisher), a 2019 episode
- "My Brother's Keeper" (Sliders), a 1999 episode
- "My Brother's Keeper" (Tales from the Crypt), a 1990 episode
- "My Brother's Keeper" (The Vampire Diaries), a 2012 episode

== Music ==
- My Brother's Keeper (Long Live G), an EP by DaBaby, 2020
- My Brother's Keeper (K-Ci and JoJo album), 2013
- My Brother's Keeper (Lake album), 2006
- My Brother's Keeper (OuterSpace album), 2011
- "My Brother's Keeper", a song by Ying Yang Twins from U.S.A. (United State of Atlanta), 2005

== Politics ==
- My Brother's Keeper Challenge

== See also ==
- Am I My Brother's Keeper, an album by Kane & Abel, 1998
- Brother's keeper (disambiguation)
- Her Brother's Keeper (disambiguation)
- His Brother's Keeper (disambiguation)
- My Sister's Keeper (disambiguation)
