= B&K =

B&K may refer to:

- Brüel & Kjær, a Danish multinational engineering and electronics company
- Banjo & Kazooie, a pair of fictional video game characters
- B&K Rootbeer, an independent chain of drive-in fast-food restaurants
- B&K Corporation, Chinese biopharmaceutical company.

== See also ==
- BK (disambiguation)
