= List of Lucifer episodes =

Lucifer is an American fantasy police procedural comedy-drama television series developed by Tom Kapinos that premiered on Fox on January 25, 2016. It features characters created by Neil Gaiman, Sam Kieth, and Mike Dringenberg taken from the comic book series The Sandman, which later became the protagonist of the spin-off comic book series Lucifer written by Mike Carey, both published by DC Comics' Vertigo imprint. Fox canceled the series after three seasons in May 2018, but it was picked up by Netflix a month later and ran until its conclusion.

During the course of the series, 93 episodes of Lucifer aired over six seasons, between January 25, 2016, and September 10, 2021.

== Series overview ==
Season	Episodes		Originally released		
Season	Episodes		First released	Last released	Network
1	13		January 25, 2016	April 25, 2016	Fox
2	18		September 19, 2016	May 29, 2017	Fox
3	24		October 2, 2017	May 14, 2018	Fox
3	2		May 28, 2018 (Note: Before the series was initially cancelled by Fox, co-showrunner Ildy Modrovich stated that two episodes produced for the third season were set to be moved to a then-potential fourth season. After the third-season finale on May 14, 2018, both episodes were broadcast on Fox as a singular two-hour bonus episode on May 28.)		Fox
4	10		May 8, 2019		Netflix
5	16	8	August 21, 2020		Netflix
5	16	8	May 28, 2021		Netflix
6	10		September 10, 2021		Netflix

== Episodes ==
=== Season 1 (2016) ===
No. overall	No. in season	Title	Directed by	Written by	Original release date	Prod. code	U.S. viewers (millions)
1	1	"Pilot"	Len Wiseman	Tom Kapinos	January 25, 2016	276096	7.16
In 2016, five years after abandoning his post as the ruler of Hell, Lucifer Morningstar continues to run a high-end nightclub in Los Angeles named Lux. When he witnesses a drug dealer murdering Delilah, a pop star he had helped become successful, he persuades LAPD detective Chloe Decker to let him help her track down whoever hired the assassin. He must also deal with his brother, the angel Amenadiel Canaan, who has been tasked by their father with making Lucifer return to oversee Hell. Lucifer and Chloe discover that record producer Jimmy Barnes hired the drug dealer to kill Delilah. Jimmy shoots Chloe, prompting Lucifer to briefly discard his human form and show Jimmy his true "Devil face", which terrifies Jimmy and immediately sends him insane before he is arrested. Chloe survives and Lucifer decides that he would like to keep working with her.
2	2	"Lucifer, Stay. Good Devil."	Nathan Hope	Joe Henderson	February 1, 2016	4X6502	6.00
Lucifer undergoes the legal procedure to become an official civilian consultant to the LAPD. With Chloe recovering from being shot, Lucifer uncovers the truth about the death of an actor's son from a paparazzo who has confessed to causing the car crash. He also learns that Chloe abandoned her previous career as an actress due to the death of her father, who was a police officer. The investigation reveals the paparazzo had a slightly disturbed intern named Josh, who took his employer's motto of "always be first [to take a photo]" too far and began instigating events and causing murders. Lucifer attempts to give the two a preview of the punishment they will receive in Hell, but is instead convinced by Chloe that they will pay for their crimes in jail.
3	3	"The Would-Be Prince of Darkness"	Louis Milito	Jason Ning & Jenn Kao	February 8, 2016	4X6510	5.47
Lucifer attends a house party hosted by star quarterback Ty Huntley, (Note: Unrelated to the real-life quarterback Tyler Huntley, who debuted years after this episode aired.) where he is confused when a woman he tries to charm accuses him of being someone pretending to be Lucifer, who she claims to have already met. He convinces Huntley, a virgin who wants to wait for marriage, to accept a woman's sexual advances. The next morning, Ty wakes Lucifer up and asks him for a favor; he finds the woman's corpse in Ty's swimming pool, while Ty claims to have no memory of the night before. Lucifer calls in Chloe. The woman's phone reveals footage of Ty and the woman having sex, and Chloe arrests Ty on circumstantial evidence. Ty's manager, Joe, bails him out and directs Chloe to Ty's ex Debra, but she has an alibi, and an attempt on her life is traced back to a fixer named Ronnie Hillman. Chloe organizes a sting operation at Lux to target Ronnie; Lucifer uses the sting to have Ronnie bring him the man ruining his reputation by pretending to be him, then betrays Ronnie to the police. Ronnie reveals that the victim was her protégé and was hired by Joe, who is arrested before admitting that he accidentally choked the victim to death in order to get the sex tape footage to blackmail Ty into staying with his agency. Ty and Debra happily reunite.
4	4	"Manly Whatnots"	Matt Earl Beesley	Ildy Modrovich	February 15, 2016	4X6503	5.13
Chloe and Lucifer investigate the case of a missing girl, Lindsay Jolson, who was involved with a pickup artist. The investigation is complicated by Lucifer's repeated attempts to seduce Chloe in an effort to better understand her, as she is the first human in all of history who seems immune to his charms. Meanwhile, Amenadiel confronts a reluctant Mazikeen / Maze about Lucifer. It is revealed that Lindsay faked her kidnapping with her brother, and had previously lost her virginity to the pickup artist, who reduced her to little more than "research" for his book and did not remember her. She romanced him as revenge, getting him to genuinely fall in love with her. Chloe stops Lucifer from punishing the siblings, but is disturbed when she catches a glimpse of his Devil face in a reflection. Growing tired of Lucifer's insistence that he is immortal and invulnerable to human damage, Chloe finally accepts his request to shoot him in the leg as a test, but to Lucifer's bewilderment, he feels pain and begins to bleed.
5	5	"Sweet Kicks"	Tim Matheson	Sheri Elwood	February 22, 2016	4X6504	4.86
Chloe begs Lucifer to help her in a case involving an artist and high-end shoe designer who was once in a dangerous street gang. Lucifer agrees, excited to test his mortality after discovering that he can now be damaged by human means. It turns out that the death at the artist's fashion show was unintended, as he intended to make his product seem more desired, causing two Los Angeles gangs to nearly start a war in the process. Chloe and Lucifer attempt to defuse the situation, but end up saved by Maze, who hospitalizes all of the gangsters. Amenadiel surprises Lucifer's therapist, Dr. Linda Martin, by showing up at her office after hours and claiming to be a fellow therapist who has just moved into the office next door. The two agree to have drinks and openly discuss patients.
6	6	"Favorite Son"	David Paymer	Jason Ning	February 29, 2016	4X6505	3.91
When a warehouse is robbed and the security guard is murdered, it turns out that Lucifer is the owner of a shipping container that was stolen. He and Chloe work to find the culprit, which Lucifer sees as protecting his reputation in the city; he gives Chloe a vague statement that a gift from his father is inside the container, making it extremely valuable. Meanwhile, he continues to struggle with his identity, and Amenadiel continues trying to use Linda to get to him. Lucifer and Chloe manage to track down the container; Lucifer shows Chloe that it contains a small box filled with Russian dolls, much to the disappointment of Chloe, who was suspicious of how adamant he was in not telling her what was in the container. When Chloe leaves, Lucifer opens a hidden door at the back of the container to reveal that someone has stolen the true gift his father gave him – his angel wings.
7	7	"Wingman"	Eriq La Salle	Alex Katsnelson	March 7, 2016	4X6506	4.24
Lucifer continues the search for his wings and asks Amenadiel to help him, but is rejected and turns to Chloe for help. Chloe asks her ex-husband and fellow detective Dan Espinoza for help in investigating the Palmetto case, an incident in which a detective named Malcolm Graham was shot and put into a coma while in the middle of what Chloe believed to be a secret meeting with a criminal. Her suspicions of Malcolm have led to her being vilified at the police precinct, and she asks Dan to help her find evidence against Malcolm. The wings are apparently about to be sold at an auction attended by Lucifer, who finds that Amenadiel has shown up to help him. Lucifer regains his wings; realizing that Amenadiel plotted the theft from the beginning, he invites Amenadiel to the beach, where he lights his wings on fire. An anguished Amenadiel watches, now unable to trick Lucifer back into returning to Hell. Meanwhile, Chloe and Dan find a new lead on the Palmetto case.
8	8	"Et Tu, Doctor?"	Eagle Egilsson	Jenn Kao	March 14, 2016	4X6507	3.86
Feeling reborn, Lucifer celebrates his "re-birthday" at Lux. Malcolm, who wakes up from his coma after Amenadiel brings his soul up from Hell, also celebrates coming back. Chloe and Lucifer investigate the murder of a controversial couples therapist who encourages lovers to cheat on each other as a way of saving their relationships. Lucifer shoehorns Linda into the case in an attempt to "solve" Chloe's issues with Dan. While solving the murder case, Lucifer realizes what is happening to him. Malcolm breaks into Chloe's house and warns her not to keep digging into the Palmetto case, as whoever shot him dead clearly does not have a problem shooting cops. Chloe and Lucifer look for Malcolm's partner, but find him dead with a suicide note. Dan secretly meets with Malcolm.
9	9	"A Priest Walks into a Bar"	David Frazee	Chris Rafferty	March 21, 2016	4X6508	3.82
Lucifer is surprised when he is asked for a favor by a priest named Frank Lawrence, but turns Frank away. They meet again when Chloe pulls Lucifer into a murder case involving Arietta, a youth counselor whom Frank claims was trying to get Frank's foster son Connor involved with drug trafficking. After an attempt on Frank's life, Lucifer hides him at Lux, where they bond over playing the piano. Frank gets a call to meet Connor at church, where a drug dealer nicknamed Spider orders Connor to shoot Frank. When he fails to do so, Spider shoots at Connor, but Frank takes the bullet and dies in Lucifer's arms. Before dying, Frank shocks Lucifer by implying that he knows who Lucifer truly is. A furious Lucifer nearly chokes Spider to death, but Chloe convinces him to stop as Frank would not want this. Later, an impatient Amenadiel reminds Malcolm that he brought Malcolm back from Hell solely to kill Lucifer, thus forcing Lucifer back to his role as lord of Hell.
10	10	"Pops"	Tara Nicole Weyr	Alex Katsnelson & Mike Costa	March 28, 2016	4X6509	3.76
Chloe and Lucifer investigate the murder of Javier Aries, the poisoned head chef and owner of an upscale Mexican restaurant whose work Lucifer adores. Suspicion falls on Javier's son, a recovering drug addict named Junior, alongside the sous-chef Anne, who would inherit the restaurant if Junior was out of the picture. Things are complicated by the surprise arrival of Chloe's mother, Penelope, whom Lucifer also really admires. Chloe and Penelope argue about Chloe and Dan's seven-year-old daughter Trixie. Overhearing this, Trixie runs away to Lux to find Lucifer, but instead ends up befriending Mazikeen. Later, Mazikeen starts visiting Linda as a patient. Malcolm reveals his plan to kill Lucifer to Dan, which Dan refuses to let happen despite his annoyance at Lucifer's interference with Chloe and Dan's unexpected interest in rekindling their relationship. The two fight and Dan is knocked unconscious before Malcolm takes Dan's phone and, pretending to be Dan, breaks up with Chloe via text.
11	11	"St. Lucifer"	Mairzee Almas	Sheri Elwood & David McMillan	April 11, 2016	4X6511	3.44
A drunken Chloe arrives at Lux and tries to sleep with Lucifer to distract herself from being dumped by Dan via text, but Lucifer refuses to take advantage of her, much to the surprise of them both. After doing the morally correct thing, Lucifer experiences a strange feeling of euphoria. Believing that good deeds can give him a high equal to that of drug use, he is excited to delve into his and Chloe's current case: investigating the death of Tim Dunlear, an athlete who retired and subsequently reached even greater levels of recognition due to his charity work. Lucifer discovers that Tim's wife embezzled funds from a charity to build a school in a third-world country and killed Tim to keep it secret; he hosts an event for Tim's charity at Lux, where he outs Tim's wife to the crowd while she is giving a speech. Lucifer is disappointed to find that he does not get the good feeling from simply doing a good deed for no reason, and only gets it if he genuinely wants to help whoever is receiving his assistance. Amenadiel finds an unlikely companion in Mazikeen. Meanwhile, Dan is being held captive by Malcolm, and tries to escape and warn Lucifer before Malcolm gets to him.
12	12	"#TeamLucifer"	Greg Beeman	Ildy Modrovich	April 18, 2016	4X6512	3.81
Lucifer becomes paranoid after figuring out that being in the vicinity of Chloe is what makes him physically vulnerable. When a member of a group of Satanists is killed, Lucifer is disturbed that anyone would kill in his name. When it turns out that Malcolm is the one killing people to honor him, Lucifer threatens to torture him but is interrupted by Amenadiel, who allows Malcolm to escape. The brothers fight until Maze stops them. Chloe soon stops by Lux to talk to Lucifer, but instead finds the corpse of the street preacher who was seen arguing with Lucifer on TV, and sets out to prove that Lucifer was framed despite her initial belief that he is guilty.
13	13	"Take Me Back to Hell"	Nathan Hope	Joe Henderson	April 25, 2016	4X6513	3.89
Amenadiel saves Lucifer from being arrested by Chloe, and they go to Amenadiel's office to talk. Linda shows up and advises the two, who go looking for Malcolm while Mazikeen helps Chloe find Lucifer. Amenadiel finds Malcolm and they fight, but Malcolm – having stolen one of Mazikeen's daggers from Lux, knowing that it is one of the only things that can harm an angel – stabs Amenadiel in the stomach. Mazikeen takes Amenadiel to Lux and saves his life, relying on the healing properties of a feather she secretly kept after she accepted Lucifer's request to cut off his wings with her daggers. Dan turns himself in for helping Malcolm, thus clearing Lucifer of the murder. Chloe seizes the money Malcolm needs to leave town, and he kidnaps Trixie to force her to give it back. At the exchange, Lucifer is fatally shot when he tries to save Chloe and Trixie despite Chloe insisting that he let her go alone. Lucifer prays to his father and offers to return to oversee Hell if he protects Chloe. After briefly sending Lucifer down to Hell to see what has happened in his absence, his father accepts his offer and revives Lucifer. Malcolm is attacked by Lucifer, then shot to death by Chloe. He expresses no regrets while dying, as he has a special coin that will grant him yet another exit from Hell, but Lucifer reveals that he stole the coin from Malcolm, and destroys it in front of him. Amenadiel later wakes up at Lux, where Lucifer tells him that their father accepted his offer and wants him to track down a soul who has escaped from Hell as part of the deal. Noticing that Lucifer is uncharacteristically scared, Amenadiel asks him who escaped. Lucifer, terrified, reveals it to be their mother.

=== Season 2 (2016–17) ===
No. overall	No. in season	Title	Directed by	Written by	Original release date (Note: Season 2 episodes 14–17 were broadcast one day earlier in Canada.)	Prod. code	U.S. viewers (millions)
14	1	"Everything's Coming Up Lucifer"	Nathan Hope	Joe Henderson	September 19, 2016	T13.20051	4.36
Lucifer helps Chloe with a murder case involving a stand-in for a popular teen show actress, but becomes convinced that his mother's soul is occupying the body of the murderer in order to torment him. Lucifer tells Linda the story of how the union of his parents created the universe, and how his mother was ultimately banished to Hell. Chloe tells Lucifer that she still has some of his blood from when she shot him, and plans to run tests on it in the police lab so she can finally put an end to his constant claims that he is the Devil. Amenadiel finds out about this, worries what will happen when the test results come back as non-human, and thus persuades Chloe to believe that Lucifer is in fact a delusional human who uses magic tricks to appear otherworldly. Like Lucifer, Amenadiel starts to show signs of losing his angelic powers while on Earth. Dan is reinstated to the police force in exchange for accepting a demotion. Maze also returns from her absence, claiming that she went to see a friend and now wants to figure out how she fits into the human world. A woman shows up at Lucifer's penthouse to seek help, revealing herself to be his mother.
15	2	"Liar, Liar, Slutty Dress on Fire"	Louis Milito	Ildy Modrovich	October 3, 2016	T13.20052	3.67
In a flashback, Lucifer's mother awakens in her new body with a screwdriver lodged in her neck. She explains her story to Lucifer and they return to the hotel room she last remembers being in, where they find two murder victims. Lucifer is convinced his mother committed the crimes and gets Chloe and Dan to investigate. Lucifer later learns that the body his mother's soul is occupying is that of Charlotte Richards, a managing partner at a law firm who was having an affair with the man she recently promoted to senior partner. Cocaine is also found hidden in Charlotte's home, giving the team more suspects. The investigation ultimately shows that Charlotte was a victim and not the murderer. With the crime solved, Lucifer chastises Charlotte for abandoning him when he was banished to Hell. She replies that God initially wanted to end Lucifer's existence, but she convinced him to send Lucifer to Hell instead. Lucifer seems to accept the explanation and walks away, after which Charlotte looks to the sky with a sly smile.
16	3	"Sin-Eater"	Mairzee Almas	Alex Katsnelson	October 10, 2016	T13.20053	3.67
Chloe, Dan, and Lucifer work a case involving a serial killer whose methods of torturing victims bother Lucifer because he sees it as someone usurping his role as mankind's punisher. They find a connection to an online video moderation company of so-called digital sin-eaters headed by Leila Simms, as the murder victims are revealed to have shot and posted videos of other people being humiliated. Back at the precinct, Chloe and Dan discuss the effect their actions are having on Trixie, with Dan admitting they need to stop trying to rekindle their relationship and get a divorce. Charlotte insists that Lucifer let her see Amenadiel, but he refuses to help. However, Charlotte manages to speak to Amenadiel at Lux while she is there alone. Lucifer walks in on the discussion and comes to a decision on the punishment he will give his mother for escaping Hell: she will remain in Charlotte's body and live a normal life among humankind, whom she despises.
17	4	"Lady Parts"	Ben Bray	Sheri Elwood	October 17, 2016	T13.20054	3.63
Chloe, Dan, and Lucifer investigate a young woman's dead body that was discarded in the woods. The woman has a triangle-shaped stamp on her wrist, which becomes a key clue when they find another female victim with the same stamp. Maze, Linda, and LAPD forensic scientist Ella Lopez take Chloe to a bar for ladies' night to take her mind off of her pending divorce from Dan, but she cannot relax as she is a workaholic who does not party. Chloe sees a man who has the triangle stamp on his wrist, learns that the stamp comes from an underground sex club, and discovers that a man named Yuri had a connection to both victims. Photos on Yuri's phone may help her find the killer. Charlotte struggles to adjust to her domestic life, while Amenadiel agonizes over his diminishing angelic powers. He then learns that Lucifer's deal with God involved God sparing Chloe's life in return for returning Charlotte to Hell, and decides that Lucifer's punishment of Charlotte does not fulfill his end of the deal as she will remain on Earth; he wonders if God will take back his half of the bargain in retaliation. Soon after, Chloe is driving when a car smashes into hers.
18	5	"Weaponizer"	Karen Gaviola	Jason Ning	October 24, 2016	T13.20055	3.55
Chloe's car accident is revealed to have been caused by Uriel, Lucifer's and Amenadiel's brother who has the special ability to foresee patterns and set events in motion. Chloe is not badly hurt and returns to work, starting the case of murdered action movie star Wesley Cabot. Amenadiel is proven correct when Uriel tells Lucifer that the accident was a message: return Charlotte to Hell within 24 hours or Chloe will die. Lucifer visits Charlotte, telling her that Uriel is a sign of God's anger and that others will come to take her to Hell if she does not go willingly, but Charlotte still refuses. Amenadiel and Uriel soon get into a fight. The combination of Amenadiel's growing mortality and Uriel's ability to anticipate any next moves allows Uriel to easily win. Lucifer finally sees that Amenadiel has lost his powers, and while Charlotte agrees to return to Hell to spare her sons further violence, Lucifer confronts Uriel. He finds Uriel holding a dagger that he took from their sister Azrael, the angel of death, whose blade is the only known weapon that can permanently end an angel's existence. Realizing that Uriel intends to use the dagger to end Charlotte's existence, Lucifer fights him and loses. Maze arrives to battle with Uriel and, in the scuffle, Uriel loses the dagger. Lucifer retrieves it and plunges it into Uriel, killing him for good; before he dies, he whispers something in Lucifer's ear.
19	6	"Monster"	Eagle Egilsson	Chris Rafferty	October 31, 2016	T13.20056	3.42
At a zombie-themed wedding on Halloween, shots from an unseen source wound the groom and kill the bride. Chloe and Dan investigate and Lucifer arrives late, hungover from heavily drinking as he is still shaken after killing Uriel. Chloe reluctantly agrees to let Maze take Trixie out trick-or-treating so she can continue working the case. Maze reveals her real demonic face to Trixie, but Trixie thinks it is a Halloween costume. Amenadiel visits Charlotte, who praises the way he has always done what God asked, but Amenadiel criticizes God for allowing everything that has happened to their family. Chloe tracks the wedding sniper to a pharmaceutical company but Lucifer, hoping to be shot, steps in front of the man's next intended victim. Chloe ambushes the shooter and arrests him without incident. Lucifer visits Linda and confesses to killing Uriel. He says that he has always been a punisher in his role as the Devil, but has never killed anyone. Linda interrupts him and asks him to finally stop speaking in metaphors. Realizing that he must prove he is being honest, Lucifer sheds his human form and reveals his true face to Linda, leaving her in a state of shock.
20	7	"My Little Monkey"	Tara Nicole Weyr	Jenn Kao	November 7, 2016	T13.20057	3.52
Chloe gets a case that hits close to home when she learns that the man convicted of killing her father is being released from prison under supervision to attend his granddaughter's baptism. When the prisoner and his driver/guard subsequently end up murdered, Chloe and Dan reinvestigate and learn that the wrong man was in prison. Lucifer, still disgusted with himself for murdering Uriel, tries to copy Dan's mannerisms and fashion sense to feel more useful and less like himself. Linda tells Maze that they can no longer be friends upon learning that Maze really is a demon, leaving Maze surprised to find that she is feeling human emotions such as sadness. Searching for a profession to fulfill her existence on earth, Maze helps Chloe and the police find the man who ordered the murder of Chloe's father, and soon decides that bounty hunting is her calling.
21	8	"Trip to Stabby Town"	Nathan Hope	Jeff Lieber	November 14, 2016	T13.20058	3.87
Chloe, Dan, and Lucifer take on the case of a female stabbing victim who is revealed to have been a member of a yoga group that borders on a cult. Determined to find out who stole Azrael's dagger from Uriel's grave, Lucifer enlists the help of Ella. Her work leads Lucifer to Charlotte's law firm; when confronted, Charlotte reveals she put the dagger into the hands of mankind to get God's attention, knowing that any human who holds the blade cannot resist its influence and will immediately begin a murderous rampage. Chloe's and Lucifer's cases cross when several members of the yoga group are found stabbed to death, with Azrael's blade stuck in the final victim. While collecting evidence, Dan picks up the blade and falls under its influence; he threatens Lucifer for ruining his family, but surprises Lucifer by breaking free of the blade's hold through sheer willpower. Amenadiel later tells Lucifer he wants things back in their proper places, with Lucifer in Hell and Charlotte in Heaven, but Charlotte says she wants her entire family back in Heaven. Lucifer says he despised living in Hell, but the thought of returning to Heaven is even worse, and he names Earth as the only place he feels respected. Lucifer resumes his therapy sessions with Linda after she recovers from the shock of finding out that he truly is the Devil, and Linda begins to realize that he is just like a lot of her human patients: a damaged individual from a dysfunctional family.
22	9	"Homewrecker"	Greg Beeman	Mike Costa	November 21, 2016	T13.20059	3.63
Chloe, Dan, and Lucifer investigate the murder of a wealthy real estate mogul who owned the entire block including Lux, making him Lucifer's landlord. Their investigation turns up multiple people with motives, including the victim's son, his fiancée who comes from modest means, and a rival real estate developer who wants to tear down Lux and the rest of the block to build a shopping mall. The developer nearly gets her wish, but Chloe calls in some favors and gets Lux designated as a National Historic Landmark, making it untouchable. Charlotte becomes friendly with Dan and, suspecting that Chloe is the reason Lucifer wants to stay on Earth, plans to kill Chloe with a car bomb.
23	10	"Quid Pro Ho"	Nathan Hope	Ildy Modrovich & Julia Fontana	November 28, 2016	T13.20060	4.09
Charlotte's attempt to kill Chloe is stopped by Amenadiel, who convinces her that eliminating Chloe would only cause Lucifer to be relentless in finding her killer. Lucifer later learns that Charlotte tried to kill Chloe, but his attention is taken away by the trial of Chloe's father's murder, where Charlotte is assigned to defend Warden Smith using information unwittingly provided to her by Dan. Lucifer negotiates with a Chinese triad for information, who deliver on their promise to help him when Maze defeats their best fighter. Lucifer takes the stand as a witness and testifies that Chloe was first on the scene, accidentally putting Chloe's case at risk because her presence at the scene provides reasonable doubt. Charlotte tries to convince Chloe to lie on the stand and paint Lucifer's testimony as false, which is the only way the warden can be convicted for ordering her father's murder, but Chloe cannot bring herself to do it and instead says Lucifer told the truth. Amenadiel later meets Chloe's mother Penelope, who is distraught over her husband's killer being set free. Amenadiel remembers meeting Penelope and John Decker 35 years ago, when he was sent by God to assist in a miracle, allowing Penelope to get pregnant. He then meets with Charlotte, telling her the story and revealing that both Lucifer's emigration to Earth and meeting Chloe were predestined.
24	11	"Stewardess Interruptus"	Greg Beeman	Sheri Elwood	January 16, 2017	T13.20061	3.97
When the only apparent connection between two murder victims is the fact that they are both on Lucifer's long list of previous sexual partners, Chloe interviews all of his lovers from the past two months to find the culprit. Watching this happen, Lucifer comes to the uncomfortable realization that he was never more to his lovers than they were to him, which derails his confidence in pursuing his burgeoning affections towards Chloe. A second connection between the victims is revealed to be a mysterious figure for whom they were both smuggling an unknown but deadly substance, which goes undiscovered by the police. Maze continues to search for her own identity and learns a valuable truth from Linda. At Charlotte's behest, Amenadiel tries to manipulate Lucifer into continuing his pursuit of Chloe. In the end, Lucifer decides to stop pursuing Chloe, telling her that she is special and that he has realized he is unworthy of her. However, in explaining the things that make her special, he inadvertently convinces her that he finally cares for her and sees her as more than just a sexual conquest. She kisses him.
25	12	"Love Handles"	Karen Gaviola	Alex Katsnelson	January 23, 2017	T13.20062	4.17
Lucifer is confused when Chloe acts more carefree and relaxed in his presence, even exchanging banter with him. They try to track down the owner of a mysterious package after a college student is found dead due to an unknown poison. Clues lead them to a professor named Jason Carlisle, who had been shunned by his loved ones and colleagues for saving his thesis from a burning vehicle and leaving the driver to die. A paranoid Jason is now conducting morbid "experiments" to prove that all humans would make the same choice he did. Chloe and Lucifer find Jason in his lab. He escapes after revealing that two more victims will die from the poison unless they are given the antidote, which can only be accessed by entering a room full of poison gas that will kill whoever enters. Lucifer tells Chloe that he can save the victims if she chases Jason right away, but does not have time to explain how, and asks her to trust him. It is revealed that he needs Chloe to run far enough away that his immortality returns. He repeatedly cuts his hand until he suddenly stops taking damage and is immediately healed, signaling that he is immortal again. He breaks down the door and is unaffected by the poison gas while rescuing the victims. Chloe corners Jason, who refuses to surrender and slits his own throat. Meanwhile, Maze hears about Chloe's birth story from Charlotte, and agrees to meet with Lucifer to tell him the truth in the same bar where Amenadiel met Penelope 35 years ago. Lucifer arrives but Maze feels bad and changes her mind; Lucifer then spots a photo of Amenadiel and a young Penelope on the bar wall, and Charlotte confirms that Chloe is a miracle ordered by God as a gift for Lucifer. Believing that Chloe knew about this, an enraged Lucifer goes to her home to confront her, but discovers that she is exhibiting the symptoms of Jason's poison.
26	13	"A Good Day to Die"	Alrick Riley	Joe Henderson & Chris Rafferty	January 30, 2017	T13.20063	4.19
Lucifer and Chloe desperately search for an antidote to save her, learning that the Professor sourced the ingredients for his poisons from an amateur artist. Chloe collapses and is hospitalized, while Dan and Lucifer learn that the formula for the antidote was known only to Carlisle. With no other options, Lucifer has Maze and Linda stop his heart, allowing him to enter Hell and find Carlisle's soul, which is now eternally tormented by a recreation of the car accident with witnesses calling him a coward and a murderer. Lucifer offers him a chance at absolution in exchange for the formula, but Carlisle fails to assuage his guilt sufficiently. While waiting to be revived, however, Lucifer stumbles upon an illusion of Uriel, who forces Lucifer to kill him again and again. Charlotte sends herself to Hell to free him, but ends up succumbing to her own guilt, forcing Lucifer to drag her away. Upon being revived, Lucifer meets up with Dan and Ella, who have retrieved the ingredients, and creates the antidote. Charlotte tries to reconnect with her son, but he disowns her for deceiving him. When Chloe visits Lux later, she is shocked to find it closed for business with Lucifer nowhere to be found.
27	14	"Candy Morningstar"	Claudia Yarmy	Jenn Kao	May 1, 2017	T13.20064	3.41
Lucifer returns to Los Angeles after two weeks and introduces his wife Candy to Chloe and Dan. Chloe becomes upset, both with Lucifer's cavalier attitude and his decision to marry. When Ash Corrigan, a musician in a local band, turns up dead, Lucifer tries to help Chloe, but she pushes him away. Meanwhile, Amenadiel and Charlotte also discover that Lucifer is married and Charlotte suspects that Lucifer is planning some sort of revenge. When Maze suggests that Chloe needs a mediator, Chloe impersonates Candy as a means of getting an appointment with the mediator Ash saw for his divorce. Amenadiel confronts Lucifer for hurting Chloe's feelings. Lucifer tells him he is not trying to hurt her and that he is protecting her. The two discover that Doug, the drummer of Ash's band, is the murderer and take him into custody. Lucifer and Chloe agree to become partners again. It is revealed that Lucifer never married Candy, who turns out to be an actress who helped Lucifer in return for his saving her life in Las Vegas.
28	15	"Deceptive Little Parasite"	Brad Tanenbaum	Mike Costa & Julia Fontana	May 8, 2017	T13.20065	3.25
Lucifer retrieves Azrael's blade, which turns out to be the Flaming Sword that once guarded Eden and can cut through the Gates of Heaven, allowing Charlotte to return home. As the Lightbringer, Lucifer is the only one who can reignite the blade, but fails to do so as it can only be triggered by extreme emotion. Chloe and Dan investigate the murder of an admissions officer at a prestigious elementary school; despite uncovering embezzlement by the assistant dean, they are unable to find any leads. Chloe and Maze pose as a married couple and attend a party in honor of the deceased, where the real murderer, a teacher whose affair was discovered by the victim, is caught and subdued by Maze. Linda suggests to Lucifer that his inability to use the blade may be because he suppresses all of the pain and heartbreak in his life and, by channeling pain instead of anger, he is able to briefly ignite the Sword. It is revealed then that Charlotte is desperate to return to Heaven because her human form is weakening.
29	16	"God Johnson"	Sherwin Shilati	Jason Ning	May 15, 2017	T13.20066	3.05
Lucifer and Chloe investigate the murder of an orderly at a mental institution. The suspect is a patient calling himself "God Johnson" who proves to be immune to Lucifer's powers and knows to call him Samael. Ella identifies the man as Earl Johnson, a businessman who was committed after giving away all his wealth. Lucifer feigns insanity to get himself committed. Upon seeing Johnson heal a woman that would have been the killer's second victim, Lucifer believes that he is God. Learning that Johnson has no knowledge of Charlotte escaping Hell, Lucifer and Linda break him out and set up a surprise date between the two. Amenadiel reveals to Maze that Lucifer is returning to Heaven, leaving her behind. Johnson and Charlotte begin to reconcile, but Chloe takes him and Lucifer back to the hospital. Lucifer and Johnson are then abducted by the real killer, one of the nurses, and make peace with one another. After being rescued, Lucifer discovers that Johnson's belt buckle was part of Azrael's Blade and that Johnson was filled with the knowledge and power of God while wearing it. Realizing that his real Father would never reconcile with him, his hatred becomes even stronger.
30	17	"Sympathy for the Goddess"	Louis Milito	Joe Henderson	May 22, 2017	T13.20067	3.03
Lucifer, Amenadiel, and Charlotte cut a deal with a smuggler for the last piece of the Blade, but the smuggler is robbed and murdered before he can turn over the piece. Lucifer gets Chloe assigned to the case, who discovers that the killer is Chet Ruiz, one of Charlotte's clients and a powerful crime lord. Amenadiel and Dan bond over feeling unable to compete with Lucifer. Linda is stripped of her medical license for ethics violations and Lucifer unintentionally botches her appeal by revealing his sexual arrangement with her. Maze attacks Lucifer for manipulating her during their time on Earth. Charlotte is coerced into stealing Chet's phone from the police, but Chloe finds out. She also learns that Charlotte is the "ex-wife of Lucifer's dad" and gets her to take part in a sting operation. The piece turns out to be a rare tome that only Amenadiel can read. Maze forces the chairman of the ethics board to restore Linda's license and Charlotte accidentally kills Chet by exposing him to divine light after he stabs her. Lucifer and Amenadiel discover that the latter's necklace contains the third piece of the Blade and that Amenadiel is their Father's favorite son.
31	18	"The Good, the Bad, and the Crispy"	Karen Gaviola	Ildy Modrovich	May 29, 2017	T13.20068	3.31
Linda attempts to conceal Charlotte's wound but Lucifer recognizes that her body will soon burst. He sends Maze to find Amenadiel while he covers up Chet's murder. Ella finds the cleaners Charlotte hired and Chloe confronts Lucifer about letting his personal problems interfere with work. Amenadiel refuses to reassemble the Blade, citing renewed loyalty to his Father. Charlotte escapes, apparently kills one of the cleaners, and forces Linda to reveal Lucifer's plan. She then threatens to kill Chloe unless the last piece of the Blade, which is in Dan's possession, is delivered to her. While Amenadiel stops time for Maze to help Linda, Chet's brother, the cleaner's real killer, attempts to shoot Lucifer and Charlotte. Lucifer ignites the Blade and opens a rift leading outside the universe, where his mother can create her own world free from God's influence, and throws the Blade through with her. Later, the real Charlotte is revived, having no memory of the time her body was inhabited, to Dan's distress. At the hospital, Linda encourages Lucifer to reveal his true nature to Chloe. Before he can, however, he is knocked out cold and wakes up to find himself in the desert with his wings restored.

=== Season 3 (2017–18) ===
No. overall	No. in season	Title	Directed by	Written by	Original release date (Note: Of the third season, episodes 1–4, 15 and 18–24 were broadcast one day earlier in Canada.)	Prod. code	U.S. viewers (millions)
32	1	"They're Back, Aren't They?"	Karen Gaviola	Ildy Modrovich	October 2, 2017	T13.20751	3.92
Lucifer encounters a fleeing criminal and steals his clothes before getting the police to return him to Los Angeles. He asks Linda to remove his restored wings, but she refuses. Chloe brings him onto a new case, a dehydrated corpse found in the desert where Lucifer woke up, while overseen by her new lieutenant, Marcus Pierce. The body turns out to be that of a wealthy man, and his close friend reveals that he paid "kidnappers" to prank the victim. While attempting to restore his own wings, Amenadiel discovers Lucifer's self-severed pair. Lucifer tries to show Chloe his true "devil face", but is unable. To lure out the "kidnappers", Pierce instructs Dan to get himself kidnapped, which Lucifer arranges, but he makes himself the target at the last moment, suspecting the kidnappers to be behind his own abduction. He interrogates them and learns that the dead man was turned over to another kidnapper. The man reveals that he was hired by the Sinnerman, a mysterious crime boss, to abduct Lucifer. Lucifer, whose wings grew back after he cut them off again, initially suspects that God restored his wings as punishment for sending his mother to a void, but eventually comes to believe that it is "something darker" connected to Sinnerman.
33	2	"The One with the Baby Carrot"	Louis Milito	Joe Henderson	October 9, 2017	T13.20752	3.33
After failing to connect a recent murder to the Sinnerman, Lucifer is told by Chloe that he has to either bring her evidence that he exists or allow the case to die. Pierce assigns them a new case: a murdered comedian who accused his rival, Bobby Lowe, of stealing his jokes. Amenadiel asks Linda to help him destroy Lucifer's severed wings. While attending one of Bobby's shows, Lucifer storms the stage and accidentally shoots him with a gun hidden in a hand puppet. It turns out that Bobby did steal the jokes and wanted to be fired from the show. Pierce warns Lucifer that the Sinnerman is real and killed someone close to him during his previous posting in Chicago. Lucifer, Chloe and Dan run a sting operation, netting an old friend of Bobby's who reveals that the dead man was working on a new set with Sheila, Bobby's warm-up act. They find and arrest her. Pierce makes an agreement with Lucifer to help find the Sinnerman, so long as he keeps Chloe out of it. Inspired by something Sheila said, Lucifer decides to focus not on his regrowing wings or the loss of his devil face, but on his skill as a granter of favors.
34	3	"Mr. & Mrs. Mazikeen Smith"	Tara Nicole Weyr	Joe Henderson & Alex Katsnelson	October 16, 2017	T13.20069	3.19
Bored with her life, Maze decides to hunt a more challenging target: a serial killer named Ben Rivers, who has evaded every attempt at capture. Tracking him to Canada, she eventually finds a witness and blackmails him into revealing the location of Rivers' girlfriend. Lucifer and Chloe question Rivers' former attorney and learn that he is a master manipulator. Against Chloe's concerns that Maze might be in trouble, Lucifer sends her the bounty's address. Rivers then reveals that he used to work as a bounty hunter for Lt. Herrera, the cop who sent Maze to catch him, and the two form an unlikely bond. Dan arrives at Chloe's request, but Rivers escapes to avoid being returned to police custody. With Lucifer's help, Chloe proves Rivers to be innocent, allowing them to bring Herrera, the real murderer, to justice. Despite her feelings for him, Maze decides to leave Rivers behind and return home. Rivers warns her that Herrera was working for someone very powerful and that she is likely now in danger. A shadowy figure is then shown placing a file on Maze into a drawer filled with files on all the protagonists.
35	4	"What Would Lucifer Do?"	Eagle Egilsson	Jason Ning	October 23, 2017	T13.20753	3.26
When Amenadiel shares his insights with Lucifer, the latter suggests that Amenadiel needs to "walk in his shoes" in order to understand him. Marcus assigns Chloe a new case. The victim, a counselor who worked with troubled kids, is shown to have been murdered with a tool belonging to a missing resident. Lucifer calls in a favor, finds the resident, and brings him back to the station. He turns out to be innocent, despite Lucifer's insistence that juveniles are incapable of reform. To prove his point, he sets up a marijuana distribution ring with the other kids, inadvertently providing Chloe with a lead that uncovers the murder weapon. Amenadiel gets arrested after assaulting a pimp, but Dan bails him out. The two talk and Amenadiel realizes that Lucifer's excessive lifestyle just covers up how lonely he is. As Pierce and Chloe track the new murder suspect, Pierce is shot by the man while protecting Chloe. Lucifer, angered, tracks down the shooter and nearly kills him, but Amenadiel intervenes. Based on his experiences, Amenadiel concludes that his "test" is to have Lucifer's back. Lucifer rebukes him, enraged by the thought that his feelings for Chloe are responsible for what he has become.
36	5	"Welcome Back, Charlotte Richards"	Nathan Hope	Chris Rafferty	October 30, 2017	T13.20754	3.37
Simon Fisher, a chemist at a pudding company, is found dead in one of his vats and the company's owner turns out to be represented by Charlotte Richards, for whom Lucifer still has conflicting feelings. He and Chloe learn that the dead man wanted to sell his secret formula to a rival company and identify a fixer who had been spying on him. An encounter with Dan inspires Charlotte to visit Lucifer for help filling in her missing memories, but she mistakenly believes that they were romantically involved. After Lucifer clears things up, he discovers that she was trapped in Hell while his mother inhabited her body. He encourages her to confess her sins, which include withholding crucial evidence from Chloe. Using it, Ella determines that the pudding's ingredients can cause kidney failure and that Simon committed suicide to expose the company's wrongdoing. Overwhelmed with guilt, Charlotte has a breakdown and holds the owner, fixer, and rival owner hostage to force them to reveal who killed Simon. Lucifer talks her down and Chloe uses a recording he made to charge them with endangering public health. Lucifer meets Charlotte and admits that she is not to blame for his mother's actions; the two agree to start a professional relationship.
37	6	"Vegas with Some Radish"	Karen Gaviola	Ildy Modrovich & Sheri Elwood	November 6, 2017	T13.20072	3.48
At Chloe's birthday celebration, Lucifer receives word that Candy, his temporary wife, has disappeared. Without telling Chloe, he and Ella travel to Las Vegas, where they find a woman dressed as Candy murdered in her apartment. Lucifer suspects that a loan shark who once tried to seize Candy's father's club was responsible, but he turns up dead as well. While investigating the loan shark's wife, a pit boss at a nearby casino, Ella is caught counting cards at blackjack and she and Lucifer are thrown out. Candy, who had been posing as a waitress while following the same lead, admits that the dead woman was a friend of hers. Lucifer and Ella set a trap at the club and discover that Jedd, the bartender, was the killer; Ella subdues him and they return home. Entering his apartment, Lucifer discovers that Chloe, Dan, and Linda threw a party and attempted unsuccessfully to break into his safe. After admitting to Chloe that he was wrong not to tell her why he was leaving, he opens the safe and presents her with a gift: a necklace made from the bullet she shot him with when they first started working together.
38	7	"Off the Record"	Eduardo Sánchez	Story by : Jen Graham Imada; Teleplay by : Chris Rafferty & Mike Costa	November 13, 2017	T13.20071	3.58
After waking up from a coma, Linda's estranged husband Reese Getty, an investigative reporter, discovers her affair with Lucifer. Enraged, he decides to write an exposé to ruin his reputation. Lucifer and Chloe investigate a serial killer and Linda serves Reese with divorce papers. Lucifer confronts Reese and persuades him to drop his investigation; just as Reese accepts that Lucifer is right, he witnesses him use his devil face. A year later, a nearly deranged Reese decides to kill Lucifer, shooting him in the middle of a therapy session. Linda explains that she knows Lucifer's true nature but Reese storms out. He then tracks down the killer and gets him to poison Lucifer, but an innocent woman is killed instead. Reese blames Lucifer for his actions. Lucifer counters that humans like Reese are responsible for damning themselves. Reese tries to make up with Linda but she is not interested at all. He goes to his office to turn himself in, where he gets the poison he deserves from the killer, who is arrested. Reese then wakes up at the beginning of the episode, revealing that Reese has been in a hell loop.
39	8	"Chloe Does Lucifer"	Louis Milito	Julia Fontana	November 20, 2017	T13.20755	3.26
Lucifer grows concerned when Amenadiel calls him "boring" and sets out to prove him wrong. A woman named Kim Jones is murdered and Chloe traces the last call she made to Top Meet, a popular dating app. Chloe attends the company's mixer and adopts Lucifer's mannerisms to blend in. She and Dan locate a man who reveals that Kim was about to receive a large sum of money. It turns out that Kim founded Top Meet and wanted to make it more accessible, and that Mac, whom she chose as CEO, killed her to preserve the app's exclusivity. While planning her ex-husband's funeral, Linda has an existential crisis and reveals that Reese's passing has made her fear death. Amenadiel manages to calm her by explaining that he once had a similar crisis, thus fixing their friendship. Wanting to avoid damnation, Charlotte lies to Ella about wanting to study forensics, giving her an excuse to follow the latter around. When Ella points out that being "good" means not just words, but actions, Charlotte decides to leave her practice and join the district attorney's office. Lucifer briefly contemplates whether being boring is for him, before deciding it is not.
40	9	"The Sinnerman"	Marisol Adler	Jenn Kao	December 4, 2017	T13.20756	3.39
Pierce rejects Chloe's request for a personal day. Joey Pileggi, who asked Lucifer for a favor months before, winds up murdered. Lucifer reveals the favor was getting him work as a mob courier. Maze becomes uneasy about Linda and Amenadiel growing closer. Charlotte, as a prosecutor, joins Chloe and Lucifer as they question Frankie Ferrante, the mobster who mentored Joey, and learn that his death was not mob-related. Another body turns up, which Lucifer recognizes as another client. Ella identifies the killer as the Sinnerman, who lures Lucifer into an abandoned building and traps him inside. With Charlotte's help, Chloe manipulates Frankie into going after the Sinnerman, but Charlotte feels hurt that Chloe didn't tell her the plan. Maze finds Lucifer and forces him to acknowledge her feelings before freeing him. Pierce tells Chloe that he plans to get revenge against the Sinnerman for murdering his brother. The Sinnerman ambushes Frankie, but Chloe and Pierce manage to capture him. Maze asks Linda to stop seeing Amenadiel. Dan comforts Charlotte and tells her being "good" takes time and commitment. Lucifer tries using his powers on the Sinnerman, but the latter gouges his own eyes out before he can do so.
41	10	"The Sin Bin"	Greg Beeman	Sheri Elwood	December 11, 2017	T13.20757	3.36
The Sinnerman claims that a woman will soon be drowned in a spot only he knows. Chloe tracks a possible lead, which takes them to the woman's car and a planted bomb. Realizing the only option, Chloe has Ella help her smuggle the Sinnerman out. Trixie encourages Charlotte to be a better mother. Pierce and Chloe manage to save the woman, but Lucifer and the Sinnerman vanish. The woman apparently owed the Sinnerman a debt and set up her own kidnapping. The Sinnerman wakes up in Lucifer's private estate, where Maze proceeds to torture him until he is close to death. Despite a celestial rule dictating that angels may not take human lives, Lucifer concludes that killing him is the only solution. Maze abandons him in disgust. Lucifer realizes that the Sinnerman's true desire is to die by his hand. Pierce arrives with Chloe and fatally shoots the Sinnerman. After deducing that the Sinnerman was working for someone more powerful, Lucifer calls Pierce to Lux. It is revealed that Pierce is in fact the immortal Cain, the world's first murderer who was cursed to wander the Earth forever.
42	11	"City of Angels?"	Mark Tonderai	Jason Ning & Jenn Kao	January 1, 2018	T13.20070	3.11
In 2011, Lucifer leaves Hell for Los Angeles. His brother Amenadiel demands that he return to Hell, but Lucifer talks him into delaying their departure. Amenadiel is shot and his necklace is stolen. Knowing the danger of exposing humans to divinity, he persuades Lucifer to help him find it in return for a favor. Meanwhile, beat cop Chloe Decker and her husband, Det. Dan Espinoza, investigate the murder of MMA fighter Aiden Scott. Lucifer abducts the promoter who tried to fix Aiden's last fight, summoning his demon torturer Mazikeen to interrogate him. Chloe visits the promoter's lawyer, Charlotte Richards, and pressures her into setting up a sting operation with her client. Lucifer sets up a fight with Amenadiel to show that they are the same. Amenadiel dominates the fight, but allows Lucifer to win by submission to prove that, unlike Lucifer, he can control his pride. The sting nets Aiden's mentor Gil, but Lucifer and Amenadiel snatch him up and force him to confess to murder and theft before leaving him to be arrested. Lucifer uses his favor to get Amenadiel to leave him on Earth. He also has Maze cut off his wings.
43	12	"All About Her"	Tara Nicole Weyr	Alex Katsnelson	January 22, 2018	T13.20758	3.77
Lucifer accuses Pierce of working for God, but he denies it. A surfer's body is found on a private beach. Chloe, furious with Lucifer for going behind her back in the previous episode, blocks him from the investigation. Charlotte chastises Pierce for yelling at Ella and Amenadiel learns, falsely, that he has contracted chlamydia. Linda advises Lucifer to pay more attention to Chloe's needs and Dan tells him to be helpful without getting in her way. Chloe suspects that a surfer gang may have been involved in the murder, sending Dan to go undercover and work their leader, Wild Child. After learning that Pierce intends to skip town, Lucifer discovers that he wishes to die and had previously put himself and Chloe in danger hoping to be killed after learning that Lucifer is vulnerable around Chloe. Wild Child tells Dan that the gang had nothing to do with the murder and Chloe deduces that the "owners" of the beach were framing them. Linda tells Amenadiel that she is not comfortable dating him due to Maze's objections, but they kiss and Maze sees them. Lucifer makes a deal with Pierce to end his life.
44	13	"Til Death Do Us Part"	Sherwin Shilati	Mike Costa	January 29, 2018	T13.20759	3.67
Pierce loses faith in Lucifer's lack of progress. Maze theorizes that he must have an exploitable weakness. Murdered woman June Lee turns out to be a criminal named Sandra Jiang, whose death is found to be connected to her role cooking ecstasy. Lucifer collects the mobster who once employed Sandra. He agrees to cooperate with the investigation in return for Sandra's recipe. To prove that Sandra was selling her product independently, Chloe decides to have Lucifer and Pierce pose as a married couple in order to infiltrate her neighborhood. Dan and Charlotte go on their first date, but Maze crashes it due to her attraction to Charlotte. The cops learn that a "watchdog" who has been terrorizing the neighborhood is connected to Sandra's death. Lucifer lures him out, but he turns out to be innocent. His wife is revealed to be the killer, having mistakenly believed Sandra to be having an affair with her husband. Charlotte decides that she needs some time away from relationships in order to refocus. Pierce notes that, as much as Lucifer wants to help him, he is more interested in using him to get revenge on his father.
45	14	"My Brother's Keeper"	Claudia Yarmy	Joe Henderson & Jason Ning	February 5, 2018	T13.20760	3.71
Lucifer, realizing that he understands nothing about Cain's mark, asks Amenadiel for help, but he refuses. Ella's older brother, Jay Lopez, disappears after a man he was meeting is murdered. Chloe asks Ella to recuse herself from the investigation, but she and Maze go off to find him anyway. Charlotte is turned down by Linda when she asks for a consultation, as she still fears her. The victim is tied to a jewelry store heist, and Lucifer and Chloe check with the owner, who reveals that the "robbery" was actually insurance fraud. Pierce tracks down Amenadiel, who he knows gave him the mark, and assaults him in anger. Chloe and Dan confirm that Jay was, in fact, hired to "clean" the stolen diamonds.
46	15	"High School Poppycock"	Louis Milito	Chris Rafferty & Jen Graham Imada	February 26, 2018	T13.20761	3.18
Lucifer has a nightmare about Chloe dying. On his quest to help Pierce, Lucifer uses murdered author Kathleen Pike's latest work to overcome his lack of ideas. Linda and Amenadiel continue their romance in secret, unaware that Maze already knows. Chloe learns that the characters in Kathleen's books are based on people from her high school days. Lucifer agrees to go undercover with her at an upcoming reunion to find the killer. Maze intentionally sets up Linda and Amenadiel on blind dates with herself and Todd, the man Lucifer impersonates at the reunion, as revenge for their deception. Maze angrily storms out after Linda defends her actions. Chloe and Lucifer discover that all of the party attendees have an alibi except for Todd, who explains that Kathleen had a different ending for her book from what her editor wanted, and Chloe realizes he is not the killer, and uses that information to set a trap for the real one. Lucifer has a breakdown when he realizes that Kathleen's work was destroyed and leaves. Linda breaks up with Amenadiel for Maze's sake. Lucifer throws Chloe the prom she never had and also has an epiphany thanks to her: to break Pierce's curse, he has to prevent the circumstances that caused it.
47	16	"Infernal Guinea Pig"	Eagle Egilsson	Jenn Kao & Julia Fontana	March 5, 2018	T13.20762	3.13
To break Pierce's curse, Lucifer proposes resurrecting Abel from Hell. However, the plan goes awry when Abel is revived in the body of Bree Garland (Lauren Lapkus), the assistant to B movie producer Alexa Lee, whose office was recently blown up by a bomb. Based on information provided by Maze, Lucifer and Pierce track Abel to a pool party. Amenadiel arrives and tries to persuade Abel to commit suicide by claiming he is still in Hell. Chloe's investigation uncovers links between Alexa's film studio and a Bolivian drug cartel and she realizes that Bree, who had been aware of her employer's crimes, was trying to expose her. Abel encounters Pierce and shoots him, but he is unharmed. Chloe takes Bree and Lucifer to Alexa's office for evidence, where they narrowly manage to defuse another bomb. Using a recovered fingerprint, Chloe has Alexa arrested for money laundering. Charlotte makes progress in therapy with Linda, while Amenadiel, after fighting with Maze, calls her childish for ruining his chance at romance. Abel, having somewhat reconciled with his brother, asks for some space to figure himself out. Lucifer, concerned about Chloe's safety, informs Pierce that he is ending their partnership and Abel is killed by an ambulance.
48	17	"Let Pinhead Sing!"	Alrick Riley	Ildy Modrovich & Sheri Elwood	March 12, 2018	T13.20763	2.97
Pop singer Axara's life is threatened when one of her backup dancers (wearing a mask and the same outfit as Axara) gets killed by a high-powered firework. Chloe investigates without much help from Lucifer, who is still worried about putting Chloe in danger and trying to avoid her, but does offer to sequester Axara at Lux until the killer is found. Suspicion falls on a crazed fan, who is soon found dead himself, then to Axara's manager before evidence ultimately leads Chloe to Axara's former high school friend and current tour manager, Cece. Elsewhere, Pierce is dejected over Lucifer backing off on helping him die and the fact that Abel could not kill him either. Ella convinces Dan to talk to him, which does no good, but a conversation with Amenadiel seems to help. Pierce once again believes that Chloe is the key and uses Axara concert tickets Chloe received as a thank-you to ask her out on a date (which she tells Lucifer). Meanwhile, Linda tries to reconcile her friendship with Maze, even getting Charlotte to mediate their dispute, but Maze refuses.
49	18	"The Last Heartbreak"	Hanelle Culpepper	Alex Katsnelson & Mike Costa	March 19, 2018	T13.20764	3.23
In 1958, Pierce, an LAPD detective, is assigned to investigate a serial murderer known as the "Broken Hearts Killer". In the present, two new victims are found that match the killer's MO. Lucifer tries to get between what he suspects is a growing romance between Chloe and Pierce. Dan tells a drunken Maze to pull herself together for Chloe's sake. More victims turn up, validating Pierce's belief that a copycat is responsible. Amenadiel runs into Charlotte and Linda advises him to keep his distance. Pierce visits the granddaughter of his partner from 1958, getting back his files on the case. Maze and Dan argue and Maze ends up insulting Trixie, unaware that she is behind her. Using a radio call-in show to set up a sting, Chloe and Pierce pose as a cheating couple and lure out the killer, who turns out to be a man who found the original killer's journals and became obsessed with them. Charlotte persuades Amenadiel to reveal the truth to her. Pierce decides to pursue a relationship with Chloe, with which Lucifer has (for the time-being) come to terms.
50	19	"Orange Is the New Maze"	Nathan Hope	Jenn Kao	March 26, 2018	T13.20765	3.19
Maze asks Lucifer to send her back to Hell but he refuses, believing it will lead to repercussions for Chloe, and suggests that she needs to blow off some steam. Linda warns Charlotte not to see Amenadiel again. Security footage of a new murder seems to implicate Maze as the killer and Chloe learns that the victim was one of her bounties. Maze subsequently turns herself in, claiming guilt, and even hands over the murder weapon, but when Chloe presses her, it becomes clear that Maze only wants to take the fall. Charlotte forces Lucifer to tell her about his mother. Maze escapes custody and Chloe determines that someone is framing her. Pierce becomes increasingly jealous of the "special relationship" between Lucifer and Chloe. A conversation with a former bounty leads them to a wealthy winery owner, who blames Maze for getting her son killed. Chloe persuades Maze to spare the owner's life; instead, she stabs her in the foot. Lucifer, prompted by Amenadiel, reveals his true self to Charlotte. When Lucifer tries to persuade her to stay, Maze, angry that he refuses to consider her feelings, prepares to leave town, but Pierce stops her and promises to help her if she helps him.
51	20	"The Angel of San Bernardino"	Tara Nicole Weyr	Jason Ning	April 16, 2018	T13.20766	3.18
A news story surfaces of a guardian angel rescuing a victim in San Bernardino, leading Lucifer to wonder if he's responsible. Pierce's relationship with Chloe is strained by her refusal to let him meet Trixie. Linda suggests that Lucifer may not be aware of his actions because he is subconsciously trying to distract himself; both he and Amenadiel suspect that God is responsible. Chloe finds a video of a fight involving the victim, which leads them to an actor who was hired to keep him from breaking his addiction to heroin. Lucifer's refusal to sleep interferes with his work. Lucifer forces the murderer to confess, but realizes his situation is similar and believes that Pierce is behind the "guardian angel" plan to keep him away from Chloe. Maze reveals that she's the "guardian angel". Pierce wants Chloe to say "I love you" in hopes of removing the mark. Chloe is about to tell him she loves him but he stops her and breaks up, breaking her heart. Furious, Lucifer attacks Pierce. Pierce admits he has had a change of heart. He does not fight, allowing Lucifer to hurt him, but Lucifer realizes the mark has vanished, rendering Pierce mortal.
52	21	"Anything Pierce Can Do I Can Do Better"	Jim Vickers	Alex Katsnelson	April 23, 2018	T13.20767	2.82
Pierce contemplates suicide, but realizes he truly loves Chloe. Seeing a chance for a normal life where he can grow old with her and die, he tries to win her back. A new murder case comes in: Reina Markova, a prima ballerina who was strangled while practicing. Lucifer decides that the only way to get Chloe back is to outshine Pierce in every way. Pierce reneges on his plan to frame Lucifer for his murder, which angers Maze. Reina's former understudy reveals that she was set to host a reality competition show, but ultimately backed out; it then turns out that the show's creator was blackmailed into offering her the job. Amenadiel recruits Charlotte to help him expose Pierce as the Sinnerman. Lucifer and Chloe uncover an affair between Reina and the ballet company chairman, while Charlotte is caught trying to follow Pierce and attempts to seduce him, but fails. Ella and Dan deduce that Reina's partner Miguel was behind the blackmail and killed her to protect himself. Pierce and Lucifer both invite Chloe to have dinner with them, but Pierce decides to tell Chloe how he feels and proposes to her, just as Lucifer arrives to tell her how he feels about her.
53	22	"All Hands on Decker"	Eduardo Sánchez	Sheri Elwood	April 30, 2018	T13.20768	2.84
Ella plans Chloe's bachelorette party. Lucifer and Dan investigate the murder of a dog trainer, with Lucifer taking the lead to "understand" Chloe better. Pierce's mark reappears, which Maze interprets as a sign that Chloe is unsure of her love. Amenadiel recruits Charlotte to break off the engagement. Dan enters a gambling den in search of a suspect, before Lucifer stages a surprise police raid. Maze intentionally throws a boring party and Linda, Ella, and Charlotte hire a party bus instead. Amenadiel tries to persuade Pierce against losing his immortality. The murder suspect reveals that he is an amateur trainer and that his purebred mastiff is expecting puppies that could fetch high prices. Ella figures out that Maze and Charlotte are both trying to manipulate Chloe and stops the party. A drunken Chloe rides off in the bus, while Dan and Lucifer deduce that the victim's partner is the killer and arrest him. Maze learns that Pierce's mark is fake and tries to kill him, but he uses Trixie to force her to leave. Dan expresses his feelings for Charlotte and they begin a real relationship. Chloe ends her engagement and resumes working with Lucifer, angering Pierce.
54	23	"Quintessential Deckerstar"	Claudia Yarmy	Ildy Modrovich	May 7, 2018	T13.20769	2.90
Charlotte continues to have nightmares of Hell. Lucifer struggles to tell Chloe how he feels. Retired baseball player Forest Clay's wife is murdered. Charlotte identifies him as the killer, revealing that she destroyed evidence of another murder for him years before. Amenadiel tries to restore his wings. Ella discredits Clay's alibi and Chloe discovers that both he and his wife were cheating on each other. Pierce and Maze plan to kill Amenadiel so Pierce can get his mark back. Charlotte stages a distraction while Amenadiel steals information from her former law firm, which leads them to a murder matching Charlotte's version of events. Chloe contemplates her feelings for Lucifer. Charlotte assists Chloe in apprehending Clay. When Maze turns on Pierce, he sedates her and shoots at Amenadiel, only to kill Charlotte when she shields him. Lucifer confesses his feelings and that he is the Devil to Chloe, who says he is not, at least not to her, and they kiss. A grieving Amenadiel regains his wings, using them to bring Charlotte's soul to Heaven as Lucifer and Chloe receive a phone call, leading to Chloe, Lucifer, and Dan arriving at the crime scene where they find Charlotte's body.
55	24	"A Devil of My Word"	Eagle Egilsson	Joe Henderson	May 14, 2018	T13.20770	3.20
Pierce takes control of the investigation into Charlotte's death. Dan finds Charlotte's notes on Pierce and informs Chloe and Lucifer that Pierce is the killer. Pierce arranges for one of the criminals Charlotte was prosecuting to be framed for her murder. Dan has Ella tip off Pierce on their progress, prompting him to send a hit man for Dan, but the hit man is captured. Believing that Linda is in danger, Maze escapes Pierce's men to find her. Maze and Linda reconcile. Lucifer tells Ella that he suspects Amenadiel is right. God is not responsible for changing him; he is. The captured hit man gives Chloe information that leads her and Lucifer into an ambush. Chloe is shot and Lucifer uses his wings to shield her. He carries her to safety before using his wings to subdue Pierce's henchmen. Pierce confronts Lucifer with one of Maze's daggers, but Lucifer kills Pierce with it instead. Pierce believes that he will be going to Heaven, as he feels no regrets, but Lucifer reveals that Pierce will be haunted by the murder of Charlotte for eternity in Hell. The anger Lucifer feels causes his devil face to return, allowing Chloe to see his true nature.
Bonus episodes
56	25	"Boo Normal"	Lisa Demaine	Jen Graham Imada	May 28, 2018	T13.20771	2.42
As Ella contemplates moving back to Detroit, she assists on the case of a murdered psychologist. While doing so, she is visited by Rae-Rae, a "ghost" who first appeared to Ella when she survived a car crash at the age of 8. However, Ella had not seen or heard from Rae-Rae since leaving Detroit five years ago and tries to figure out why she has reappeared. After hearing the story, Lucifer realizes that Rae-Rae is Azrael, the Angel of Death. In a conversation between the two, Azrael tells Lucifer that she was behind Ella moving to California and working for the LAPD. She explains that, because she could not be in either one's lives, she wanted to ensure her "favorite brother and favorite human" would be together in the same place, knowing that Lucifer would watch out for Ella.
57	26	"Once Upon a Time"	Kevin Alejandro	Story by : Ricardo Lopez Jr. Teleplay by : Ildy Modrovich & Joe Henderson	May 28, 2018	T13.20772	2.42
God narrates events in a timeline where Chloe's father, John Decker, survived the shooting that was supposed to take his life. Thus, Chloe remains an actress. The story ponders if Chloe and Lucifer would have still found each other. They do when Chloe's friend, a stuntman in her current film, is murdered at Lux and both Chloe and Lucifer search for the killer. They manage to solve the case with the help of Ella (who in this reality is a professional carjacker and mechanic) and Amenadiel, who stops time for Lucifer. John is proud of his daughter, but he does not want her to join the police. Nevertheless, Chloe decides that she wants to consider the possibility and Lucifer jokes that perhaps they will get to work together again. The episode ends with God reflecting on the fact that, despite being in completely different circumstances, Chloe and Lucifer are destined to be together as in the original timeline. Meanwhile, a morally corrupt Dan and Charlotte, who is Lucifer's lawyer, come together over the heist of Lucifer's money, and Linda, a therapist on a reality show dealing with high-profile celebrities, is torn at the success of her show at the cost of her good conscience.

=== Season 4 (2019) ===
No. overall	No. in season	Title	Directed by	Written by	Original release date	Prod. code
58	1	"Everything's Okay"	Sherwin Shilati	Joe Henderson	May 8, 2019	T13.21501
One month after Cain's death and Charlotte Richards' ascension to Heaven by Amenadiel, Lucifer has been depressed thinking how Chloe might be processing the revelation of his being the Devil himself. Arriving at the scene of a murdered beekeeper, Bob Goldbach, Chloe finally arrives, much to Lucifer's bewilderment. As the two try to reconnect, they encounter U.S. Marshal Luke Reynolds, Goldbach's WITSEC handler. Learning Bob was a mob enforcer, they verify with members of his crime family in Los Angeles to find suspects, but none turn up. Given her behavior around him, Lucifer begins to wonder if Chloe may be repulsed by him but, remembering Reynolds' statement and finding a contradiction, Chloe figures out Reynolds killed Goldbach, and planned to kill his wife to incriminate another enforcer until Lucifer and Chloe stop him while saving his intended victim. Meanwhile, Maze and Amenadiel return to make amends with friends and claim the city as their home. While Chloe tells Lucifer that she sees him as her partner, she is meeting with a Priest who is helping her against Lucifer.
59	2	"Somebody's Been Reading Dante's Inferno"	Sam Hill	Ildy Modrovich	May 8, 2019	T13.21502
During Chloe's sabbatical, she meets Father Kinley, who serves a division of the Church that knows about Lucifer. In the present, a reality show contestant, Melinda Hagey, is found dead. After questioning other contestants, Chloe questions Lucifer, only to learn he isn't like his depictions and that he hated ruling Hell. Ella's lab work reveals that Melinda ate food from the staff. Maury, the producer, reveals he taped Melinda with another contestant, Kylie, in the bathroom making out. A bereft Kylie admits to Melinda's death, over mistaking her talks with Maury as an affair. Later on, Chloe meets Lucifer for dinner and he explains his vulnerability in her proximity. After a phone call from Ella, Chloe deduces the real killer was the cameraman, who killed Melinda for reneging on their deal to split the prize money. Meanwhile, Amenadiel tries to interact with humanity, but finds it challenging, while Maze knows that since Chloe learned the truth, she's afraid Maze could hurt Trixie. After Linda faints, her lab tests prove Amenadiel got her pregnant. Chloe meets Kinley and dissolves their agreement to return Lucifer to Hell. Kinley responds by going to Lucifer about news he doesn't know about Chloe.
60	3	"O, Ye of Little Faith, Father"	Jessika Borsiczky	Jason Ning	May 8, 2019	T13.21503
Kinley visits Lucifer, revealing Chloe's plans to send him back to Hell. Amenadiel proposes to Linda, but she only wants a hand to hold, which he offers. Meanwhile, rocket scientist Susan Ochoa and mechanic David Ramirez, both former "Los X" gang members, are murdered. Deciding not to wait for a warrant, Dan and Maze take matters into their own hands to get information from Los X's leader, learning Oscar Rivas, Susan and David's drug counselor, is the killer. Lucifer hints to Chloe that he knows she has lied to him, just as Dan calls with information on Oscar. Lucifer confronts Oscar, who wants Lucifer to kill him as punishment and "reveal Lucifer's true self". Sensing something is amiss, Lucifer keeps his "devil face" back, so Oscar kills himself. Finding a one-way mirror, Chloe and Lucifer deduce Kinley orchestrated the case to expose Lucifer as the Devil. Chloe arrests Kinley for his role in the murders, but admits she is not ready to accept Lucifer as he truly is; hurt by Chloe's deception, Lucifer decides to take time away from her. Kinley is excommunicated from the Church. The episode closes as Eve walks into Lux and orders an Appletini.
61	4	"All About Eve"	Sherwin Shilati	Chris Rafferty	May 8, 2019	T13.21504
Jeweler Pablo Silva is murdered and the necklace he just made is stolen; evidence leads to Bashir Al-Fassad. Lucifer runs into Eve at Lux; she used Pablo as a ride to L.A. Eve is attacked for the necklace, but Lucifer saves her. Chloe and Dan, followed by Lucifer and Eve, go to Bashir's; Chloe calls in Bashir's favor to Lucifer for intel. A video from Pablo's phone reveals another girl on the plane, the grifter "Odessa". Lucifer and Eve strike a deal: for Eve's safety, he will find the necklace for Bashir. Both parties find Odessa in a bar fight, but she gave the necklace to a broker for auction. Lucifer finds the auction, but Chloe urges he find the broker, who is revealed to be Bashir's right-hand man. Chloe then realizes that Pablo was killed by his partner to increase the value of the necklace. Eve admits coming to Earth for Lucifer, accepting his devil face. Chloe arrives to see them kiss and leaves dismayed. Linda and Amenadiel are having a boy, but worry if it has wings. Maze asks if she can move in, feeling unwelcomed by Chloe. Chloe also connects with Linda over knowing about the supernatural.
62	5	"Expire Erect"	Viet Nguyen	Mike Costa	May 8, 2019	T13.21505
Wanting closure with Chloe, who needs a vintage car to get into an exclusive automobile enthusiasts club for a case, Lucifer agrees to help in their "final case". Ella learns about Eve, going to Lux to warn her off, but Eve charms her and they take drugs together. Chloe also meets Eve, just as her suspect, Marco Franklin, holds everyone at Lux hostage with a bomb, shooting Lucifer in front of Chloe. Dan and Maze work to satisfy the killer's demand to find his wife, Leona, while Dan sends a bad sandwich to Marco. Chloe, understanding the sandwich's context, realizes SWAT will breach from the southwest. Ella is given cocaine to be stimulated enough to defuse the bomb. Leona is found but, upon entering Lux, she stabs Marco, revealing she planned a robbery, but Marco took the fall. Chloe tricks Leona to the southwest corner of Lux, where she is stunned by SWAT's entering as Ella defuses the bomb. Chloe throws herself onto Lucifer to protect him. Lucifer says this won't be their last case, but acknowledges Eve is his girlfriend. Eve is shocked to learn that Chloe is the only one who makes him vulnerable. Ella also further loses faith in God.
63	6	"Orgy Pants to Work"	Louis Milito	Aiyana White	May 8, 2019	T13.21506
Eve befriends Maze, but is dismayed by Lucifer's duties with the LAPD. Linda notes Lucifer's double life will burn him out; as proof, Lucifer mixes up apology gifts to Chloe and Eve. Investigating the murder of Gary Van Brunt, they are led to Vincent Walker, a Kidnap/Ransom specialist who Gary audited. Vincent fought with Gary over bribes to border guards to ensure client safety, but was on a plane during the murder. Ella finds Gary was wearing overly expensive clothing for his lifestyle; Lucifer concludes he was attacked at a nudist colony in Malibu Canyon. The owner, Julian McCaffrey, is the prime suspect, but his father, shipping tycoon Jacob Tiernan, has his lawyers free Julian before long. Staking out one of Tiernan's ships, they discover Julian is involved with human trafficking. Lucifer confronts him, but Julian escapes by dropping barrels on him and killing Officer Joan, one of Lucifer's LAPD friends. Eve urges Lucifer to punish Julian; he breaks Julian's spine, crippling him. Meanwhile, the angel Remiel arrives, having sensed the baby angel, to take and raise it in Heaven. Maze takes Amenadiel's place at Lamaze class and builds a maternal bond with Linda.
64	7	"Devil Is as Devil Does"	Richard Speight Jr.	Jen Graham Imada	May 8, 2019	T13.21507
A defeated Remiel warns Amenadiel that he will regret raising his son on Earth. Maze becomes protective of Linda. Julian confesses to all charges; Dan believes Lucifer crippled him, but Chloe knows he is bitter over Charlotte's death. The murder of Sam Zofrelli points to Greg "Pony Boy" Grabowski, but Chloe finds "Pony Boy" works for Tiernan through a shell company. Lucifer realizes Tiernan killed Sam, thinking he crippled Julian; Lucifer almost attacks him, but is calmed by Chloe. Later, Lucifer admits to crippling Julian; being the devil, he's above mortal law. Dan tells Tiernan of Lucifer's actions. Trixie visits Lucifer out of concern and is suspicious of Eve, while Dan and Chloe find her missing and race to Lucifer's penthouse. Pony Boy attacks, but Lucifer subdues him and goes to confront Tiernan. Intimidating him, Lucifer brings Tiernan to the precinct to confess, remembering Chloe saw the better side of him and wanting to regain her trust. Dan and Ella start an affair. Chloe meets Kinley in jail and learns the prophecy: Lucifer and his "first love" unleash evil. Lucifer calls Linda for help, as his angel wings have become demon wings.
65	8	"Super Bad Boyfriend"	Claudia Yarmy	Jason Ning	May 8, 2019	T13.21508
Investigating the death of teacher Sandra Baez, Chloe tells Lucifer about the prophecy; he concludes breaking up with Eve will stop it, but can't get rid of her. Ella and Dan decide to end their affair. Students Lexy and Nate reveal Nate's father was sleeping with Sandra after his divorce, but that they mutually broke up a week ago. Lucifer takes Eve to his sessions, but it backfires, as does playing the "clichéd bad husband". Caleb Mayfield, a student needing a "Lucifer favor", meets Amenadiel; Caleb wants out from selling drugs for dealer Tahir. Later, two officers arrest Caleb, as the murder weapon was in Caleb's locker, with a building hostility, until Dan arrives and orders them to stand down. Nate reveals Sandra found out they stole the SAT answers, so Lexy killed her with Caleb's golf club; he kept Lexy's bloody clothes, which clears Caleb. At wits' end, Lucifer snaps at Eve, telling her they're over. Chloe calls, revealing Caleb was shot dead. Lucifer joins a furious Amenadiel, who beats up Tahir; losing faith in humanity, Amenadiel decides to raise his son in Heaven. During a session with Linda, Lucifer realizes he suffers deep self-hatred.
66	9	"Save Lucifer"	Lisa Demaine	Joe Henderson	May 8, 2019	T13.21509
Realtor Beth Murphy finds her sister Megan murdered and Megan's twin Moira standing over the body. Lucifer discovers he's slowly morphing into his "devil form", confiding in Chloe that his recent revelation must be the cause. Eve wants him back, so Maze takes her on a bounty hunt to make Lucifer jealous. Chloe uses a masquerade party as a sting and to conceal Lucifer's change. Maze arrives to see Linda give birth; the baby is named Charlie in Charlotte's memory. Freed by Maze earlier, Kinley suggests Eve take Lucifer back to Hell; he tries to kill her, but Eve kills him and summons a demon into the corpse.
67	10	"Who's da New King of Hell?"	Eagle Egilsson	Ildy Modrovich	May 8, 2019	T13.21510
Father Kinley is possessed by the demon Dromos, who kills another human to summon his brother Squee. Chloe finds a social media post of Kinley entering a church, but discovers Maze tracking Kinley; she realizes the situation and updates Chloe. At Lux, Dromos and Squee greet Lucifer; angry at Dromos for disobeying his ban on possessions, Lucifer tells him to return to Hell. In retaliation, Dromos decides to kidnap Charlie and raise him as the new king of Hell. Meanwhile, Ella regains her faith and persuades Dan to let go of his anger. Lucifer, Amenadiel, Maze, Chloe, and Eve launch a rescue mission but, when the demons outnumber them, Lucifer is forced to transform into the Devil and order the demons back to Hell. The ordeal has Amenadiel choose to raise Charlie on Earth with Linda. Eve departs to find herself. Chloe finally accepts Lucifer, admitting her love, but Lucifer realizes that the prophecy was right and Chloe was his true first love, not Eve. After sharing a kiss with Chloe, Lucifer returns to his throne in Hell.

=== Season 5 (2020–21) ===
No. overall	No. in season	Title	Directed by	Written by	Original release date	Prod. code
Part 1
68	1	"Really Sad Devil Guy"	Eagle Egilsson	Jason Ning	August 21, 2020	T13.22151
Two months after Lucifer returned to Hell, Chloe and Maze partner to solve a murder and also spend time together to fill the void from the departures of Lucifer and Eve. In Hell, where thousands of years have passed, Lucifer visits the murder victim in his hell loop and, once he notices the crime happened in Los Angeles, decides to try to solve it. The murder victim is Lee "Mr. Said Out Bitch" Garner, with whom Lucifer has dealt on previous occasions. Chloe tells Maze she does not need her help anymore. When Chloe visits the sister of the victim, she is attacked, but Lucifer appears to save her; simultaneously, it is revealed that Lucifer is still in Hell. Also, Amenadiel takes charge of Lux and tries to clean up the club by going after a drug dealer. Dan uses self-help therapy to cope.
69	2	"Lucifer! Lucifer! Lucifer!"	Sherwin Shilati	Ildy Modrovich	August 21, 2020	T13.22152
Lucifer returns to assist Chloe in the investigation of a murder at an isolation experiment for a future mission to Mars at a company that is run by Anders Brody. Lucifer, however, seems to be different; instead of bringing out people's desires, he brings out their fears and has a generally different demeanor. When Maze confronts him, he reveals he is Michael, Lucifer's twin brother. He wants to get back at Lucifer and talks Maze into helping him. Chloe proposes getting intimate with Lucifer, but ends up revealing that she knew he was an impostor from when they first kissed upon his return. Michael tells Chloe that she's a gift from God for Lucifer. Amenadiel goes to Hell to tell Lucifer to come back to Earth and deal with Michael.
70	3	"¡Diablo!"	Claudia Yarmy	Mike Costa	August 21, 2020	T13.22153
The real Lucifer returns from Hell and confirms to Chloe she was a gift, upsetting her. They investigate the murder of a showrunner who created a show based on them. Maze is upset that Lucifer did not take her to Hell with him, but Lucifer points out Amenadiel could have taken her. Linda realizes Maze has abandonment issues stemming from when her mother, Lilith, left her and the rest of the demons. Lucifer and Michael have a showdown. Michael claims he was behind originally influencing Lucifer into leaving Hell to vacation in Los Angeles, along with many other events in his life. After an even fight, Lucifer uses Maze's blade to gash Michael's face, preventing him from impersonating Lucifer again. Later, Michael tells Maze about a secret Lucifer is keeping from her and how she can find out what it is.
71	4	"It Never Ends Well for the Chicken"	Viet Nguyen	Aiyana White	August 21, 2020	T13.22154
Trixie visits Lucifer at his penthouse and has him tell her a story about his ring, presented in a black-and-white noir style. In 1946 New York City, Lucifer visits Lilith, Maze's mother. Lilith has Lucifer find her stolen ring because he owes her for giving him her children for his army against Heaven. Lucifer gets the assistance of P.I. Jack Monroe to find the thief. When she gets the ring back, Lilith decides to give up her immortality, putting it in her ring and giving it to Lucifer. She tells him not to tell any of her children so they remain strong and unbreakable. After Lucifer finishes the story, Trixie retells it to Maze, who paid her to get the scoop. Maze goes to Reno, Nevada and finds an elderly Lilith (who regrets becoming mortal), but they do not reconcile.
72	5	"Detective Amenadiel"	Sam Hill	Joe Henderson	August 21, 2020	T13.22155
Lucifer brings Chloe to the site where he cut off his wings, but Chloe still needs time to process being a gift. She wants to avoid any "God" stuff, but is called to investigate the murder of a nun at a convent. The nuns are hesitant to provide information, so Amenadiel assists her. Lucifer helps Dan with paperwork in hopes of speeding up solving the case along with Chloe's processing the situation. Lucifer learns from Dan that there are no shortcuts in solving cases and deduces there are not any with Chloe's processing, either. Chloe learns Amenadiel's role in her being a gift. With the help of Amenadiel, she realizes that the gift is actually her immunity to Lucifer's mojo, allowing her to see the real him. Chloe goes to Lucifer's penthouse and tells him that Amenadiel has a theory that Lucifer chooses to be vulnerable around her; they kiss. Meanwhile, Linda tells Maze that she gave up a child when she was 17. They locate her at an open house working as a realtor, but Linda fails to reveal that she's her mother. Maze goes back to visit Lilith, but learns that Lilith has died from old age, much to the anger of Maze.
73	6	"BlueBallz"	Richard Speight Jr.	Jen Graham Imada	August 21, 2020	T13.22156
Lucifer and Chloe investigate the murder of a DJ, interrupting their night together. The real target of the murder is DJ Karnal (real name Jed), a former boyfriend of Chloe's, which makes Lucifer jealous. Maze dresses and acts like Ella to try and understand how to make an emotional connection with someone. At the same time, Linda and Amenadiel cannot figure out how to get Charlie to stop crying. Jed tells Lucifer that Chloe dumped him because he was no longer a mystery, so Lucifer decides to be a mystery and begins to ignore Chloe's phone calls. Chloe sets up a sting operation at Lux with Ella, Maze, and Linda to find the killer while Dan, Lucifer, Jed, and Amenadiel try to calm Charlie. Jed sneaks back to Lux and draws out the killer. After realizing Lucifer's devil face calms Charlie, they tell Dan he's no longer needed, but Michael, posing as Lucifer, calls him to come back to the house, allowing Dan to see Lucifer's devil face. Chloe goes back to Lucifer's penthouse and they have sex.
74	7	"Our Mojo"	Nathan Hope	Julia Fontana	August 21, 2020	T13.22157
The morning after they have sex, Chloe appears to have taken Lucifer's power to elicit desires (mojo), but it ends up only working on him. They investigate the murder of an opera singer. Ella begins dating a reporter named Pete Daily. Maze tries to re-enact her first fight with Amenadiel, but it ends up with her revealing that she is sad about not having a soul and needs someone to talk to. Dan visits Charlotte's grave, worried he's going to hell after learning Lucifer really is the devil, but Michael flies in and tells him how he can have salvation. After another victim is found with the same MO, they realize it's the work of a serial killer the papers have dubbed the Whisper Killer. Ella and Pete help Chloe and Lucifer catch the killer, who uses lilies before cutting his victims' vocal chords. Chloe still feels there is more to the case and keeps working on it. She tells Lucifer that she thinks that revealing his desires is a result of him opening himself up to her. Dan later shows up and shoots Lucifer.
75	8	"Spoiler Alert"	Kevin Alejandro	Chris Rafferty	August 21, 2020	T13.22158
Lucifer is unharmed from Dan's gunshot, now invulnerable around Chloe. While Lucifer plots for the perfect revenge against Dan, Chloe keeps investigating the Whisper Killer. She learns that the one they caught is a copycat, but gets kidnapped when leaving Lucifer a voicemail. Ella helps Lucifer continue Chloe's investigation and find her. Pete gives Ella the keys to his house and tells her he has files on the Whisper Killer. She goes to his house, but discovers a farm of rare lilies the killer uses. Pete admits to being the real Whisper Killer, but not to kidnapping Chloe; Ella manages to subdue Pete, who is arrested. It is revealed that Michael kidnapped Chloe, using her fears to sow doubt about Lucifer. Maze confronts him, but he promises a way for her to have a soul. Charlie gets sick and Amenadiel's anxiety about his child being a mortal causes him to subconsciously freeze time. Maze joins Michael in fighting against Lucifer and Amenadiel while time is frozen and eventually God shows up, saying "Children, you know I hate it when you fight."
Part 2
76	9	"Family Dinner"	Nathan Hope	Joe Henderson	May 28, 2021	T13.22159
God arrives just in time to stop the fighting, telling Lucifer, Amenadiel, and Michael to reconcile and inviting all of them to a 'family dinner,' which shocks everyone. Meanwhile, Chloe feels that she may have rushed Lucifer into confessing his love for her, so she decides to 'give him some space.' Maze drops by to meet God and asks for a soul, but he refuses to give her one, enraging her into leaving. Lucifer and the others arrive for dinner at Linda's house, but it quickly devolves into a heated argument between Lucifer and Michael until God finally raises his voice to stop it. Lucifer leaves, frustrated with his father. Not long after, for reasons unknown, God banishes Michael from Earth. Lucifer talks to Chloe and tells her that he cannot say that he loves her because he feels that, due to him being so much like his father, it would be a lie.
77	10	"Bloody Celestial Karaoke Jam"	Sherwin Shilati	Ildy Modrovich	May 28, 2021	T13.22160
God decides to stay on Earth to further understand Lucifer and his life, but his presence causes people to burst into song and dance without warning; no one is aware of this beyond the angels. Lucifer decides to try discussing his problems with God in order to try and get to the root of them and improve. Amenadiel reveals to Linda that Charlie is a regular human; while Linda is relieved, Amenadiel is upset, stating that angels are better than humans. This causes an argument to erupt between the two of them, but they eventually make up when Amenadiel realizes they are all imperfect. Lucifer is frustrated by God's meddling in his life and the constant abrupt singing, but God reveals that he was doing this unintentionally and is losing control of his powers.
78	11	"Resting Devil Face"	Bola Ogun	Story by : Mira Z. Barnum, Joshua Duckworth & Ricardo Lopez Jr. Teleplay by : Aiyana White	May 28, 2021	T13.22161
God back-pedals from his statement, claiming that his powers are just on the fritz from arriving on Earth, but Lucifer refuses to believe him after God accidentally blows up Daniel before putting him back together. God makes himself human in order to better understand Lucifer's life and begins to enjoy the simple mundanities of being human. Chloe is troubled when Trixie goes through a rebellious phase. Later, when God intervenes on a sting operation with Lucifer, he absently reveals that Lucifer is with the police, causing the drug dealers to panic and hit him. God experiences fear for the first time and Lucifer becomes enraged at his father being hurt, even revealing his devil face. God is horrified by the devil face, as it reveals what Lucifer thinks of himself. Maze learns of God's vulnerability and tries to kill him, but cannot bring herself to do so when she hears him talk about his own flaws and mistakes to Trixie. God later takes his powers back and talks to Maze, thanking her for not killing him and telling her that miracles can happen, that she could potentially obtain a soul. Later on, God talks to Amenadiel and Lucifer, revealing that his problems have been going on for much longer and he intends to retire.
79	12	"Daniel Espinoza: Naked and Afraid"	Greg Beeman	Mike Costa	May 28, 2021	T13.22162
Dan is given a case by Lucifer for a prisoner transfer. The next day, he wakes up with a dead body beside him. Later, he gets jumped near his car, asks Ella for help, then goes to someone's house and gets knocked out by them. Amenadiel arrives to help Dan get out of the house. Dan gets Lucifer for assistance and Lucifer bonds with some gang members. Dan realizes that his friend is the mastermind behind this, so Dan gets a crew for help against his friend, including Maze. Later, a standoff between Dan and his improv crew versus the Russian Mob, the Los X's, and Dan's old buddy turns violent. Maze jumps and saves Dan from getting shot. Lucifer arrives and tells Dan that this whole transfer case was supposed to be a prank for when Dan shot Lucifer at the penthouse. Lucifer is disappointed because he wanted to make Dan feel bad about shooting him, but Dan actually tells him that this helped him get over his guilt.
80	13	"A Little Harmless Stalking"	Richard Speight Jr.	Julia Fontana & Jen Graham Imada	May 28, 2021	T13.22163
Dr. Linda follows a car driven by Adriana, her daughter given up for adoption. Lucifer has a talk with Amenadiel about Amenadiel becoming the new God and, by the end of the conversation, decides to follow his gut and not overthink things, telling Chloe that they should make their relationship official if they want to so badly. As they arrive at the murder of a Mr. Sterling, it turns out Linda was arrested, having been found on the scene. Maze, Chloe, and Lucifer realize that she is covering for someone else. Linda tells Lucifer and Chloe about her daughter Adriana and that she thinks her daughter shot Mr. Sterling. Later, Adriana gives herself up and confesses to the crime, even though her boyfriend Owen insists that she is not guilty. The investigation points at Adriana having been in some shady business dealings with an art trader, Jamie, and her muscle, Clive. Maze tracks Clive to his house, where she fights a rival bounty hunter who turns out to be Eve, who is still trying to find herself and tries to recreate the time she felt most happy with Maze. They both track Clive to a warehouse where they find the contents of a safe and the murder weapon. Clive ambushes them and, in the fight, Eve gets shot. Since Adriana's prints were on the murder weapon, she becomes the main suspect, but Ella finds evidence suggesting she was framed. Linda deduces Owen framed Adriana and threatens him at gunpoint to turn himself in, but Chloe and Lucifer talk her down. Later, Adriana visits Linda and reveals she knows Linda is her mother. Meanwhile, while preparing to take over God's position, Amenadiel comes to the conclusion he isn't ready. Lucifer then declares that he may be able to solve everyone's problems if he himself is to become the new God.
81	14	"Nothing Lasts Forever"	Lisa Demaine	Chris Rafferty	May 28, 2021	T13.22164
With God announcing his retirement, Lucifer decides to become the new God, while Michael begins building support in Heaven for his own attempt at taking over; Remiel visits Lucifer and offers to spy for him, hating the idea of Michael being in charge more than she hates Lucifer. Chloe investigates a murder at an aquarium while Ella unknowingly meets God, who soothes her fears about her own goodness. Amenadiel and God bond over a game of golf and Amenadiel realizes that Michael has been manipulating their father into believing he is losing his powers to eventually cause his retirement. To make God's retirement better, Lucifer sends Gabriel to contact Goddess, who returns from her own universe and reconciles with God. Despite the revelation that Michael is responsible for his power instability, God nevertheless decides to retire and leaves it to the angels to choose his successor, finally expressing his love for and pride in Lucifer. God implies everything was part of his plan and departs with Goddess for her universe. Unbeknownst to Lucifer, Gabriel was also working for Michael and recovers the two pieces of the Flaming Sword that Lucifer had sent into Goddess' universe.
82	15	"Is This Really How It's Going To End?!"	Ildy Modrovich	Jason Ning	May 28, 2021	T13.22165
Lucifer unsuccessfully tries to convince his siblings to support him for the God job. Chloe, unaware, resigns from the LAPD to be his "consultant." Her last case involves the killing of an evidence tech who stole murder victims' possessions. Chloe and Lucifer track down the tech's fence, who displays superhuman strength when attacking Lucifer right before he escapes. Chasing their lead, Dan is kidnapped by mercenaries who torture him for information on the fence and show him a picture of a grave. He tries to escape, but is shot and, after giving Chloe the name "Caleb," dies. Amenadiel realizes that "Caleb" is the boy he helped before and that the fence's powers come from the necklace he had put in Caleb's grave. He and Lucifer figure out that Michael has Azrael's blade and wants the necklace to reconstruct the Flaming Sword, intending to use it to stop anyone and everyone who would object to him becoming the new God. Lucifer tells Chloe that the real reason he wants to become God is to prove himself worthy of her, which angers her. Amenadiel informs Lucifer that Dan isn't in heaven at his funeral. Maze and Lucifer take revenge on the mercenaries and Lucifer tells Linda that he must become God so that he can fix the unfairness of the universe.
83	16	"A Chance at a Happy Ending"	Karen Gaviola	Joe Henderson & Ildy Modrovich	May 28, 2021	T13.22166
With Michael on the verge of becoming the new God, he offers Lucifer the chance to become king of Hell once again with Chloe as his bride, having orchestrated Dan's murder for Chloe's guilt to condemn her to Hell. Lucifer refuses and Michael kills Remiel and collects the last piece of the Flaming Sword. Lucifer, Amenadiel, Chloe, Eve, Maze, and several demons stand against Michael and his angel followers at the Los Angeles Memorial Coliseum for a vote to choose the new God, leading to a fight between Lucifer and Michael. Lucifer and Chloe manage to break apart the Flaming Sword, but Michael fatally wounds Chloe. As she passes, Chloe realizes Dan's death is not her fault and, relieved of guilt, goes to Heaven. Unwilling to lose Chloe, Lucifer travels to Heaven where he is helped by Lee Garner, who was able to escape from Hell. Protected by Lilith's immortality ring, Lucifer reaches Chloe and sacrifices himself to resurrect her before igniting for breaking his banishment from Heaven. Using superhuman strength granted by the piece of the Flaming Sword she took from him, Chloe beats Michael into submission, at which point Lucifer suddenly returns. Rather than execute his brother, Lucifer chooses to cut off Michael's wings, granting Michael a second chance on Earth. With Lucifer's selfless sacrifice having proved him worthy of becoming the new God, all of the gathered angels kneel before him.

=== Season 6 (2021) ===
No. overall	No. in season	Title	Directed by	Written by	Original release date	Prod. code
84	1	"Nothing Ever Changes Around Here"	Kevin Alejandro	Mike Costa	September 10, 2021	T13.22901
Lucifer and Chloe become murder witnesses of Jared Holbrook who was mysteriously murdered during the last performance of Magnar the Magician, Jared's mentor who was going to pass on his mantle. LAPD, Ella, and Dan's replacement Carol, who has a crush on Ella, arrive to investigate the scene. Just as Lucifer and Chloe's investigation is about get concluded, Magnar's son Alan is revealed to be the killer because he wanted his father's legacy but Magnar gave it to Jared instead. He holds Chloe at knife point, and takes her to a secret passage. Chloe knocks him out with the super-strength she got from Amenadiel's necklace piece. Meanwhile, Eve and Maze prepare to go to Hell, but after an argument between the two, Maze reveals she doesn't want to return with Eve supporting her decision, and the two get engaged. In Hell, a mysterious female is sitting on Hell's throne.
85	2	"Buckets of Baggage"	Richard Speight Jr.	Jen Graham Imada	September 10, 2021	T13.22902
While investigating the murder of Fiona Fierce, Ella and Carol develop an attraction for each other, but after her experience with Pete, Ella has trust issues. Together with Chloe, she steals Carol's personnel file and discovers a one year unexplained absence from the police. To find out more, she and Lucifer, who is still postponing becoming God, break into Carol's home and learn that he is a recovering alcoholic. Ella then finds the killer, Niles, with Carol handcuffed to a table. Niles explains that he killed Fiona because Fiona was having an affair with Niles' partner. Carol breaks out of the handcuffs and arrests Niles. Ella then confesses her investigations to Carol, and they go on a date together. Meanwhile, Dan is approached by the unknown female, revealed to be an angel, who offers to fly him back to earth if he tells her how he almost killed Lucifer. Following her date with Carol, Ella sees a frog falling from the sky and landing on her car after asking for a sign from God.
86	3	"Yabba Dabba Do Me"	Nathan Hope	Joe Henderson	September 10, 2021	T13.22903
Lucifer decides to help people he hates in order to become God. He then chooses Jimmy Barnes, the murderer from the pilot, to help first. Lucifer finds out that Jimmy died a year previously at a mental asylum after seeing Lucifer's devil face. Lucifer and Chloe leave for Hell together. Dan and the angel arrive and the angel tells him that he is a ghost and no human can see him and he can't touch anything. Lucifer and Chloe find Jimmy's hell loop, which is an animated retelling of the time Lucifer ruined Jimmy's wedding. Diving deeper into the root of Jimmy's regret, Lucifer and Chloe find out that Jimmy's mother abandoned him when Jimmy was a child to pursue a singing career and her boyfriend told her that Jimmy would only hold her back. Lucifer realizes the pain behind Jimmy's mistakes as Jimmy blamed himself for her leaving him. Maze pretends to be a criminal to help Amenadiel succeed in his training as a police officer with his FTO Sonya Harris. When Lucifer comes back to Earth, Dan warns him to go away, but the angel pins Lucifer to the wall and she tells him that she is his daughter.
87	4	"Pin the Tail on the Daddy"	Viet Nguyen	Carly Woodworth	September 10, 2021	T13.22904
Refusing to accept that the angel is his daughter, Lucifer dismisses her and she leaves in anger. He then goes on a mission to find all the women from his past he had sex with that could be her mother, but none claim the child to be theirs. Meanwhile, Dan fails to get Ella to see him, but succeeds in getting Amenadiel and Maze to see him. Chloe finds Lucifer and decides to join him on his mission after Lucifer tells Chloe about the angel. Lucifer and Chloe then find a rabbi named Esther, whose daughter Mira disappeared five years previously. Lucifer suspects that Mira is the angel, but he and Chloe find out that Mira was kept hostage at a camp, and later escaped from her biological father, and that Mira isn't the angel. Lucifer is relieved but is then worried thinking that the angel is his actual daughter. The angel then finds Chloe and hugs her happily, and she calls Chloe her mother.
88	5	"The Murder of Lucifer Morningstar"	Lisa Demaine	Lloyd Gilyard Jr.	September 10, 2021	T13.22905
The angel reveals her name as Rory, short for Aurora. Rory reveals that she is Lucifer and Chloe's daughter from the future. Rory tells Lucifer that he disappears in the future on August 4 at 10th and Swanson in Van Nuys. Lucifer refuses to accept that he left his daughter, so he thinks that he must have been murdered. Lucifer decides to find clues to this mystery. Maze starts getting scared after Rory only calls Eve her aunt, and not Maze, which turns out to be a joke. Rory also pretends to not recognize Amenadiel. Ella later opens up a board with all her suspicions on Lucifer, Amenadiel, and Maze. Lucifer thinks that he must have been murdered by Azrael's blade. He keeps it safe but it is later stolen. Lucifer blames Rory for this, angering her. Chloe reveals she stole the blade because she wants to keep Lucifer safe. Chloe refuses to give Lucifer the blade, and they fight. Chloe comes back to her senses and gives the blade to Lucifer. After having celestial qualities for a while, Chloe talks to Dan and tells him that she has been powerless ever since he died, and that she misses him so much.
89	6	"A Lot Dirtier Than That"	Claudia Yarmy	Ildy Modrovich	September 10, 2021	T13.22906
Amenadiel and Officer Harris investigate the murder of a Black man named Kevin. Much to his anger, Amenadiel finds out the detective on this case is Reiben, the officer who assaulted Caleb previously. Harris tells Amenadiel not to rock the boat since he is a rookie. He then asks Ella and Chloe for help about the information on Reiben. Reiben tells Amenadiel that he has changed and suggests that Kevin's killer could be his girlfriend, Michaela Williams. Meanwhile, Lucifer gives Rory Christmas presents for all of the Christmases that he missed for her and even sings a song, but Rory still isn't amused. Amenadiel and Harris find Michaela and the real killer but Reiben arrives and aims his guns on Michaela. Amenadiel convinces him not to do it, and Reiben arrests both the killer and Michaela. Amenadiel starts to suspect that he doesn't want to be a police officer. Amenadiel and Harris take Michaela for a final look at Kevin's house before going. Chloe finds some shocking news about the precinct.
90	7	"My Best Fiend's Wedding"	Nathan Hope	Julia Fontana	September 10, 2021	T13.22907
Maze and Eve start preparing for their wedding, when Adam arrives and meets Maze and Eve at Lux. Adam tells Eve that he wants to reconcile with her, but Eve tells Adam that she has already moved on. Adam then kidnaps Linda. Eve then lures Adam to Lux and ties him up. Maze seduces Adam, which upsets Eve. Maze admits that she told Adam about the wedding because she doesn't want to become a mother, which makes Eve leave in anger. Meanwhile, Chloe tells Amenadiel that there have been complaints filed against every officer in the precinct and Amenadiel decides to quit the LAPD. Adam releases Linda and Lucifer does a favour for Maze. Maze then brings all of her demon siblings in dead bodies, and reconciles with Eve, with Lucifer's help. Adam comes to terms with moving on, and Maze and Eve get married. At the after-party, Rory tells Chloe that she dies when she time travelled to the past. After drinking too much, Ella then yells out to everyone saying that she knows the actual truth about Lucifer.
91	8	"Save the Devil, Save the World"	DB Woodside	Aiyana White	September 10, 2021	T13.22908
Ella reveals a series of events that she has recorded that causes her to believe that the Apocalypse is coming. As a result, Lucifer attempts to return to Heaven to assume his role as God finally, but he is unable to summon his wings. Discovering that Linda has been working on a book based on her sessions with him, Lucifer and his friends go through the book in an attempt to understand the situation while Maze attempts to help Dan confront his guilt and get into Heaven without success until he relives his death and realizes what he must do. During a confrontation with Rory, Lucifer proves his love for his daughter by making himself vulnerable so that she can shoot him in the thigh and after reading Linda's manuscript, and Rory finally understands the love that her parents share. While Lucifer realizes that he is finally ready to become God, he decides that he doesn't want to be as it isn't his true calling. Lucifer comforts Linda over her perceived failure to help him and Amenadiel visits to reveal that he knows why the world is ending.
92	9	"Goodbye, Lucifer"	Kevin Alejandro	Chris Rafferty	September 10, 2021	T13.22909
Amenadiel tells Lucifer that their siblings are messing with prayers and that is why that the world is ending. Lucifer tells Amenadiel that he isn't going to be God anymore, which surprises Amenadiel. Vincent Le Mec, Dan's murderer, escapes from prison. Chloe informs Lucifer that it is the date that Rory says that Lucifer disappears. Lucifer builds a panic room to lock himself in until midnight just in case. Dan finds Le Mec at a grocery store, and goes inside his body. Now possessing Le Mec's body, Dan goes to Lucifer and makes Lucifer recognize him. Lucifer tells Dan about his upcoming disappearance and tells Dan to spend their last days with their loved ones. Dan, still posing as Le Mec, finds Trixie and she tells him that she is proud of her father. Trixie then leaves. Dan then sees a light in the sky and enters Heaven, leaving Le Mec's body. Lucifer has an emotional goodbye with Amenadiel, who Lucifer recommends to become God, and Maze, who is leaving for her honeymoon with Eve. Lucifer, Chloe, and Rory go on a last family vacation before Rory leaves. Lucifer and Chloe come back and lock themselves in the panic room until midnight. Lucifer makes it through the day, but Le Mec calls Lucifer saying that he has kidnapped Rory at 10th and Swanson, the street where Rory said that Lucifer disappears.
93	10	"Partners Til the End"	Sherwin Shilati	Joe Henderson & Ildy Modrovich	September 10, 2021	T13.22910
After finding out that Le Mec has kidnapped Rory, Lucifer decides to go and save her, with Chloe tagging along with him. When Lucifer and Chloe arrive at 10th and Swanson, Chloe gets stabbed but she manages to survive. Lucifer asks Le Mec to stab him, but Rory breaks free and almost kills Le Mec, with her devil face almost taking over her face, but Lucifer persuades her to not kill him. Chloe arrives and shoots Le Mec. Right before his death, Le Mec reveals to Lucifer that Dan made it to Heaven. After hearing this from Lucifer, Rory realizes that Lucifer left his family to redeem all the lost souls in Hell, like he did with Dan and Lee Garner. Rory makes Lucifer promise to keep things the way they will be in the future. Lucifer and Chloe have an emotional goodbye before Lucifer sets off for Hell. After a while, it is shown that everyone is happy, with Dan and Charlotte reunited in Heaven. Back to her own time, Rory has an emotional goodbye with Chloe before Chloe dies and goes to Heaven. Amenadiel, who is now the new God, takes Chloe to Hell and reunites her with Lucifer, who is now a therapist redeeming lost souls in Hell.

== Ratings ==
=== Season 1 ===
Viewership and ratings per episode of List of Lucifer episodes
No.	Title	Air date	Rating/share (18–49)	Viewers (millions)	DVR (18–49)	DVR viewers (millions)	Total (18–49)	Total viewers (millions)
1	"Pilot"	January 25, 2016	2.4/7	7.16	1.4	3.63	3.8	10.78
2	"Lucifer, Stay. Good Devil."	February 1, 2016	2.0/6	6.00	1.1	3.30	3.1	9.30
3	"The Would-Be Prince of Darkness"	February 8, 2016	1.7/5	5.47	1.1	3.00	2.8	8.46
4	"Manly Whatnots"	February 15, 2016	1.6/4	5.13	1.1	2.97	2.7	8.10
5	"Sweet Kicks"	February 22, 2016	1.5/4	4.86	1.1	2.97	2.6	7.83
6	"Favorite Son"	February 29, 2016	1.3/4	3.91	1.1	3.00	2.4	6.91
7	"Wingman"	March 7, 2016	1.3/4	4.24	1.0	2.80	2.3	7.04
8	"Et Tu, Doctor?"	March 14, 2016	1.2/4	3.86	1.1	3.05	2.3	6.91
9	"A Priest Walks into a Bar"	March 21, 2016	1.2/4	3.82	1.1	3.04	2.3	6.86
10	"Pops"	March 28, 2016	1.2/4	3.76	1.1	2.94	2.3	6.68
11	"St. Lucifer"	April 11, 2016	1.1/4	3.44	1.0	2.86	2.1	6.28
12	"#TeamLucifer"	April 18, 2016	1.3/4	3.81	0.9	2.68	2.2	6.49
13	"Take Me Back to Hell"	April 25, 2016	1.3/4	3.89	0.9	2.68	2.2	6.57

=== Season 2 ===
Viewership and ratings per episode of List of Lucifer episodes
No.	Title	Air date	Rating/share (18–49)	Viewers (millions)	DVR (18–49)	DVR viewers (millions)	Total (18–49)	Total viewers (millions)
1	"Everything's Coming Up Lucifer"	September 19, 2016	1.3/4	4.36	0.9	2.75	2.2	7.11
2	"Liar, Liar, Slutty Dress on Fire"	October 3, 2016	1.1/4	3.67	0.9	2.69	2.0	6.37
3	"Sin-Eater"	October 10, 2016	1.0/3	3.67	0.9	2.63	1.9	6.30
4	"Lady Parts"	October 17, 2016	1.1/4	3.63	0.7	2.30	1.8	5.92
5	"Weaponizer"	October 24, 2016	1.0/4	3.55	0.8	2.26	1.8	5.81
6	"Monster"	October 31, 2016	0.9/3	3.42	0.9	2.40	1.8	5.82
7	"My Little Monkey"	November 7, 2016	1.0/3	3.52	0.8	2.51	1.8	6.03
8	"Trip to Stabby Town"	November 14, 2016	1.1/4	3.87	0.7	2.26	1.8	6.13
9	"Homewrecker"	November 21, 2016	1.0/3	3.63	0.8	2.24	1.8	5.87
10	"Quid Pro Ho"	November 28, 2016	1.1/4	4.09	0.7	2.13	1.8	6.22
11	"Stewardess Interruptus"	January 16, 2017	1.1/4	3.97	0.8	2.28	1.9	6.25
12	"Love Handles"	January 23, 2017	1.2/4	4.17	0.7	2.23	1.9	6.40
13	"A Good Day to Die"	January 30, 2017	1.2/4	4.19	0.7	2.01	1.9	6.20
14	"Candy Morningstar"	May 1, 2017	1.0/4	3.41	0.7	2.09	1.7	5.50
15	"Deceptive Little Parasite"	May 8, 2017	0.9/3	3.25	0.7	1.91	1.6	5.16
16	"God Johnson"	May 15, 2017	0.8/3	3.05	0.7	2.05	1.5	5.10
17	"Sympathy for the Goddess"	May 22, 2017	0.8/3	3.03	0.7	2.07	1.5	5.10
18	"The Good, the Bad, and the Crispy"	May 29, 2017	0.9/3	3.31	0.7	2.00	1.6	5.30

=== Season 3 ===
Viewership and ratings per episode of List of Lucifer episodes
No.	Title	Air date	Rating/share (18–49)	Viewers (millions)	DVR (18–49)	DVR viewers (millions)	Total (18–49)	Total viewers (millions)
1	"They're Back, Aren't They?"	October 2, 2017	1.1/4	3.92	—N/a	—N/a	—N/a	—N/a
2	"The One with the Baby Carrot"	October 9, 2017	0.9/3	3.33	0.6	1.82	1.5	5.16
3	"Mr. & Mrs. Mazikeen Smith"	October 16, 2017	0.9/3	3.19	—N/a	1.71	—N/a	4.90
4	"What Would Lucifer Do?"	October 23, 2017	0.8/3	3.26	—N/a	1.87	—N/a	5.13
5	"Welcome Back, Charlotte Richards"	October 30, 2017	0.9/3	3.37	—N/a	—N/a	—N/a	—N/a
6	"Vegas with Some Radish"	November 6, 2017	1.0/4	3.48	—N/a	—N/a	—N/a	—N/a
7	"Off the Record"	November 13, 2017	1.0/4	3.58	—N/a	—N/a	—N/a	—N/a
8	"Chloe Does Lucifer"	November 20, 2017	0.9/3	3.26	0.5	1.73	1.4	4.99
9	"The Sinnerman"	December 4, 2017	0.9/4	3.39	—N/a	1.87	—N/a	5.26
10	"The Sin Bin"	December 11, 2017	0.8/3	3.36	—N/a	—N/a	—N/a	—N/a
11	"City of Angels?"	January 1, 2018	0.7/2	3.11	0.7	—N/a	1.4	—N/a
12	"All About Her"	January 22, 2018	0.9/3	3.77	0.6	1.73	1.5	5.51
13	"Til Death Do Us Part"	January 29, 2018	0.8/3	3.67	—N/a	—N/a	—N/a	—N/a
14	"My Brother's Keeper"	February 5, 2018	1.0/4	3.71	—N/a	1.73	—N/a	5.44
15	"High School Poppycock"	February 26, 2018	0.8/3	3.18	0.5	1.67	1.3	4.85
16	"Infernal Guinea Pig"	March 5, 2018	0.7/3	3.13	0.5	1.65	1.2	4.77
17	"Let Pinhead Sing!"	March 12, 2018	0.7/3	2.97	0.5	1.69	1.2	4.66
18	"The Last Heartbreak"	March 19, 2018	0.8/3	3.23	0.4	1.58	1.2	4.69
19	"Orange Is the New Maze"	March 26, 2018	0.8/3	3.19	—N/a	—N/a	—N/a	—N/a
20	"The Angel of San Bernardino"	April 16, 2018	0.7/3	3.18	—N/a	1.52	—N/a	4.70
21	"Anything Pierce Can Do I Can Do Better"	April 23, 2018	0.7/3	2.82	—N/a	1.55	—N/a	4.37
22	"All Hands on Decker"	April 30, 2018	0.6/3	2.84	—N/a	1.49	—N/a	4.33
23	"Quintessential Deckerstar"	May 7, 2018	0.7/3	2.90	—N/a	1.49	—N/a	4.39
24	"A Devil of My Word"	May 14, 2018	0.8/4	3.20	0.4	1.35	1.2	4.56
25	"Boo Normal"	May 28, 2018	0.5/2	2.42	—N/a	—N/a	—N/a	—N/a
26	"Once Upon a Time"	May 28, 2018	0.5/2	2.42	—N/a	—N/a	—N/a	—N/a
