= BKFC =

BKFC may refer to:

- Bare Knuckle Fighting Championship, an American bare-knuckle boxing promotion based in Philadelphia
- Balestier Khalsa FC, a Singaporean professional football club
- Bam Khatoon F.C., an Iranian women's football club based in Bam
- Bangkok F.C., a professional Thai football club from Bangkok, Thailand

== See also ==
- BK (disambiguation)
