= My Sister's Keeper =

My Sister's Keeper may refer to:

== Novels ==
- My Sister's Keeper, 1961 novel by Ronald Verlin Cassill
- My Sisters' Keeper, 1970 novel by L. P. Hartley
- My Sister's Keeper, 1979 novel by Rachel Lindsay (Roberta Leigh), also named Janey Scott
- My Sister's Keeper (novel), 2004 novel by Jodi Picoult
- My Sister's Keeper, 2005 novel of the Journey of the Sacred King series by Janrae Frank

== Films ==
- My Sister's Keeper (TV film), 2002 television movie, directed by Ron Lagomarsino
- My Sister's Keeper (film), 2009 film adaptation of the Jodi Picoult novel

=== Episodes ===
- "My Sister's Keeper", 1963 episode of (Gunsmoke)
- "My Sister's Keeper" (That Girl), 1969
- "My Sister's Keeper" (Three's Company), 1978
- "My Sister's Keeper" (Blossom), 1991
- "My Sister's Keeper" (Digimon Adventure), 2000
- "My Sister's Keeper" (The Listener), 2009
- "My Sister's Keeper" (The Suite Life on Deck), 2010
- "My Sister's Keeper", 2010 episode of Love That Girl!

== Other uses ==
- My Sister's Keeper, non-governmental organization; see Eleanor Roosevelt Award for Human Rights

== See also ==
- My Brother's Keeper (disambiguation)
- "Not My Sister's Keeper", episode of Zeke and Luther
