= BK =

BK or Bk may refer to:

== Businesses and organizations ==
- Burger King, a chain of fast-food restaurants
- The Bank of New York Mellon, the New York Stock Exchange symbol for The Bank of New York Mellon Corporation (NYSE: BK)
- Brahma Kumaris, a religious movement
- British Knights, a manufacturer of athletic shoes
- Okay Airways (IATA airline code BK)

== Law ==
- Bosnia and Herzegovina (obsolete NATO and FIPS 10-4 country code BK)
- Criminal Code of Lithuania (Lietuvos Respublikos baudžiamasis kodeksas), in short
- Federal Criminal Police Office (Austria) (Bundeskriminalamt), a federal police force

== Science and technology ==
- BK channel, an ion channel characterized by its large conductance of potassium ions through cell membranes
- BK virus, a member of the polyomavirus family
- Berkelium (Bk), a chemical element
- Elektronika BK, a series of 16-bit PDP-11-compatible Soviet home computers developed by NPO Scientific Center
- Bordkanone, an aircraft cannon
- Brother's Keeper (software), a genealogy software program
- TU Delft Faculty of Architecture (Dutch: Faculteit Bouwkunde)
- Bradykinin, a peptide targeted by ACE inhibitors

== Other uses ==
- Bekasi Line, a light rapid transit line in Greater Jakarta, Indonesia
- B.K. Cannon, (born 1990), actress from Hawaii, USA
- BK (musician), (born 1973), the working name of the English hard house producer Ben Keen
- BK Racing, a former NASCAR team
- Bankruptcy, a legal status of a person or other entity that cannot repay debts
- Berkeley (disambiguation), in short
- Brooklyn, a borough of New York City
- Banjo-Kazooie, a series of video games
- Biratnagar Kings, professional Twenty20 cricket franchise in the Nepal Premier League
- North Sumatra (vehicle registration prefix BK)

== See also ==
- B&K (disambiguation)
