= Her Brother's Keeper =

Her Brother's Keeper may refer to:

- "Her Brother's Keeper", an episode of Gargoyles
- "Her Brother's Keeper", an episode of Saved by the Bell: The New Class
- Her Brother's Keeper, a novel by Lillian Spender

== See also ==
- Brother's keeper (disambiguation)
- My Brother's Keeper (disambiguation)
- His Brother's Keeper (disambiguation)
