= Chris Rafferty =

American television writer

- Occupation: Television writer
- Years active: 2009 - present

Chris Rafferty is an American television writer.

== Life and career ==
He was born in Maryland, and is the oldest of three brothers. From a young age he was drawn to illustrating for comic books and the complex characters within them. He wrote a spec script for Buffy the Vampire Slayer as his first work in television.

He participated in the 2014 Warner Bros. Writers Workshop.

=== The Flash ===
In summer 2014, Rafferty was hired as a writer on The CW's The Flash. His first script, co-written with co-executive producer Jaime Paglia, was the freshman season episode "The Flash is Born."

=== Lucifer ===
In 2016, Rafferty began writing for another comic book television adaptation in Fox’s Lucifer. His writing debut for the show was the ninth episode of the first season, titled "A Priest Walks into a Bar."
