= His Brother's Keeper =

His Brother's Keeper may refer to:

- His Brother's Keeper (1921 film), an American silent film directed by Wilfrid North
- His Brother's Keeper (1940 film), a British film written by Brock Williams
- His Brother's Keeper, an 1895 Christian-themed novel by Charles Sheldon
- His Brother's Keeper, a 1993 novel by Peter Rawlinson, Baron Rawlinson of Ewell
- His Brother's Keeper: A Story from the Edge of Medicine, a 2004 book by Jonathan Weiner
- His Brother's Keeper: The Life and Murder of Tennessee Williams, a 1983 biography by Dakin Williams, brother of Tennessee Williams

== See also ==
- Brother's keeper (disambiguation)
- My Brother's Keeper (disambiguation)
- Her Brother's Keeper (disambiguation)
