= Lucifer (TV series) =

American urban fantasy television series

- Genre: Mystery; Occult detective fiction; Urban fantasy; Police procedural; Comedy drama
- Based on: Characters created for DC Vertigo by: Neil Gaiman; Sam Kieth; Mike Dringenberg
- Developed by: Tom Kapinos
- Showrunner: Joe Henderson
- Starring: Tom Ellis; Lauren German; Kevin Alejandro; D. B. Woodside; Lesley-Ann Brandt; Scarlett Estevez; Rachael Harris; Kevin Rankin; Tricia Helfer; Aimee Garcia; Tom Welling; Inbar Lavi; Brianna Hildebrand
- Theme music composer: Heavy Young Heathens
- Opening theme: "Being Evil Has a Price"
- Composers: Ben Decter; Jeff Russo; Marco Beltrami; Dennis Smith
- Country of origin: United States
- Original language: English
- No. of seasons: 6
- No. of episodes: 93 (list of episodes)

Production
- Executive producers: Ildy Modrovich; Len Wiseman; Jonathan Littman; Jerry Bruckheimer; Joe Henderson; Tom Ellis
- Producers: Alex Katsnelson; Michael Azzolino; Erik Holmberg; Karen Gaviola
- Production locations: Vancouver (seasons 1–2); Los Angeles (seasons 3–6)
- Cinematography: Glen Keenan; Ryan McMaster; Tico Poulakakis; Stefan von Bjorn; Barry Donlevy; Christian Sebaldt
- Editors: Marc Pattavina; Ray Daniels III; Romain Cancellara; Fred Peterson; Hector Carrillo; Matt Coleshill; Jill D'Agnenica; Nicolas Patitucci
- Camera setup: Single-camera
- Running time: 42–65 minutes
- Production companies: Jerry Bruckheimer Television; DC Entertainment; Warner Bros. Television

Original release
- Network: Fox
- Release: January 25, 2016 – May 28, 2018
- Network: Netflix
- Release: May 8, 2019 – September 10, 2021

Lucifer is an American urban fantasy television series developed by Tom Kapinos that began airing on January 25, 2016, and concluded on September 10, 2021. It revolves around Lucifer Morningstar (Tom Ellis), an alternate version of the DC Comics character of the same name created by Neil Gaiman, Sam Kieth and Mike Dringenberg. In the series, Lucifer, the devil, abandons Hell to run a nightclub in Los Angeles, subsequently experiencing massive life changes when he becomes a consultant to the Los Angeles Police Department. The supporting cast includes Lauren German, Kevin Alejandro, D. B. Woodside, Lesley-Ann Brandt, Rachael Harris and Aimee Garcia.

Filming took place primarily in Vancouver before production was relocated entirely to Los Angeles at the start of the third season. The series was produced by Jerry Bruckheimer Television, DC Entertainment, and Warner Bros. Television. The first season of Lucifer received mixed reviews from critics, and its original broadcaster Fox canceled it after three seasons in May 2018. A month later, Netflix picked up the show following a fan campaign to save it, and the series continued for a further three seasons; it consistently earned high viewership during its time on Netflix.

== Plot ==
The series focuses on Lucifer Morningstar, a powerful archangel who was cast out of Heaven for his rebellion and forced to spend millennia punishing people as the lord of Hell. Bored and unhappy with his life in Hell, he abdicates his throne in defiance of his father (God) and moves to Los Angeles, where he runs his own nightclub. When he finds himself involved in a murder investigation, he meets Chloe Decker, a detective with the Los Angeles Police Department who intrigues him as she is the first human to be immune to his charms. After helping the police solve the case with his most commonly used power – compelling humans into revealing their deepest desires to him – Lucifer accepts a subsequent invitation to work continuously with Chloe as a police consultant. They encounter other supernatural beings while solving crimes together as their relationship develops. Throughout the series Lucifer also goes to a psychiatrist, Dr Linda Martin, with whom he analyzes his relationships with the detective and other characters. Many of the cases he encounters reflect the emotional problems he himself is dealing with. The latter is the driving arc of the story of how the celestial reflects the human.

== Cast and characters ==
- Tom Ellis as Lucifer Morningstar: Bored with his life as the Lord of Hell, Lucifer abandons his throne to run his own high-end nightclub in Los Angeles while working as a civilian consultant for the local police. In season 5, Ellis also portrays Lucifer's twin brother Michael, who briefly takes over his brother's identity after Lucifer returns to Hell.
- Lauren German as Detective Chloe Decker: A homicide detective and former actress whose late father was an LAPD officer. She solves crimes with Lucifer, who takes an interest in her upon noticing that she seems to be the first human he has ever encountered who is immune to his charms.
- Kevin Alejandro as Detective Daniel "Dan" Espinoza: An LAPD homicide detective and Chloe's ex-husband, he develops a complicated friendship with Lucifer as they often clash and insult each other, partly due to the fact that Lucifer and Chloe slowly become romantically involved.
- D. B. Woodside as Amenadiel: Lucifer's older brother, he is an angel and the eldest of all their siblings. He arrives in Los Angeles to encourage Lucifer to go back to Hell, and failing that, he attempts to force Lucifer back in different ways. He later becomes the father of the first half-angel/half-human baby in history with Linda.
- Lesley-Ann Brandt as Mazikeen "Maze": A confidante and devoted ally of Lucifer, she is a demon who, having served as Lucifer's head torturer, joins him in Los Angeles to act as a bartender and bodyguard at his club. In the second season, Maze looks for a new direction on Earth and becomes a bounty hunter. She marries Eve in the final season. In season 5, Brandt also portrays the demon Lilith, who is Maze's mother and Lucifer's ex-lover.
- Scarlett Estevez as Beatrice "Trixie" Espinoza (seasons 1–4, recurring seasons 5–6): Chloe and Dan's young daughter who befriends Lucifer and Mazikeen, initially to their chagrin.
- Rachael Harris as Dr. Linda Martin: Lucifer's Stanford-educated psychotherapist. In season 4, she and Amenadiel welcome their son Charlie, who is considered the first half-angel/half-human baby in history.
- Kevin Rankin as Detective Malcolm Graham (season 1): A crooked police officer who was shot prior to the beginning of the series. He briefly died but then is brought back from Hell by Amenadiel to kill Lucifer.
- Aimee Garcia as Ella Lopez (seasons 2–6): A forensic scientist for the LAPD from Detroit. In season 3, it is revealed that Ella had been regularly visited by Lucifer's sister "Rae-Rae" Azrael, the Angel of Death, after surviving a car crash in her youth. She is known for her bubbly personality and almost endless optimism and enthusiasm.
- Tricia Helfer as Mum / Goddess (season 2; guest season 5) and Charlotte Richards (seasons 2–3; guest season 6) and as Shirley Monroe (guest season 5/episode 4): Lucifer and Amenadiel's mother and exiled wife of God, who has escaped her prison in Hell, she is described as "the goddess of all creation". On Earth, her soul occupies the body of Charlotte Richards, a murdered lawyer.
- Tom Welling as Lieutenant Marcus Pierce / Cain (season 3): A highly respected police lieutenant who oversees the work of Chloe, Dan, and Ella at the LAPD. He is revealed to be the immortal Cain, Adam and Eve's son and Abel's brother. He is the world's first murderer, condemned to wander the Earth forever with the Mark of Cain.
- Inbar Lavi as Eve (season 4; guest season 5; recurring season 6): The world's first female human who recently left Heaven, Cain's mother and former lover of Lucifer. She eventually becomes a bounty hunter and marries Maze.
- Brianna Hildebrand as Aurora, aka Rory (season 6): A half-human/half-angel (Nephilim) who shows up in Hell and then on Earth seeking vengeance on Lucifer. She absconds to Earth with Dan's soul in an attempt to learn how to kill Lucifer. She is later revealed to be Chloe's and Lucifer's daughter from the future, who is enraged with Lucifer for his apparent abandonment of her before she was even born. She has blades instead of feathers in her wings, which can hurt Lucifer.

== Episodes ==
Season	Episodes		Originally released		
Season	Episodes		First released	Last released	Network
1	13		January 25, 2016	April 25, 2016	Fox
2	18		September 19, 2016	May 29, 2017	Fox
3	24		October 2, 2017	May 14, 2018	Fox
3	2		May 28, 2018 (Note: Before the series was initially cancelled by Fox, co-showrunner Ildy Modrovich stated that two episodes produced for the third season were set to be moved to a then-potential fourth season. After the third-season finale on May 14, 2018, both episodes were broadcast on Fox as a singular two-hour bonus episode on May 28.)		Fox
4	10		May 8, 2019		Netflix
5	16	8	August 21, 2020		Netflix
5	16	8	May 28, 2021		Netflix
6	10		September 10, 2021		Netflix

The second season premiered on September 19, 2016. Initially consisting of 13 episodes, the series later received a 9-episode extension for a full 22-episode second-season pickup by Fox. The third season, initially consisting of 22 episodes, premiered on October 2, 2017, but the final four episodes of the second season were removed and placed in the third season to air, resulting in the second season consisting of 18 episodes and the third season of 26. Writer Chris Rafferty indicated that the third season would instead contain 24 episodes, and an additional two episodes would be held for a possible fourth season.

In May 2018, Fox canceled the series after three seasons, stating it was a "ratings-based decision". The two episodes originally planned for a fourth season aired as "bonus episodes" at the end of the third season; they were broadcast on May 28.

The following month, Netflix picked up the series for a fourth season of ten episodes, which was released on May 8, 2019. Netflix renewed the series for a fifth season of sixteen episodes, split into two halves. The first half was released on August 21, 2020, and the second half was released on May 28, 2021. The series was renewed for a sixth and final season of ten episodes, which was released on September 10, 2021.

== Production ==
=== Development ===
In September 2014, DC and Fox were developing a television series based on The Sandman character Lucifer, as originally written by Neil Gaiman. The series is a "loose adaptation" of the original comic book. In May 2015, the series was officially picked up for 13 episodes for the 2015–16 season. Fox then hired Almost Human alum Joe Henderson as showrunner, with Kapinos remaining on the series in a lesser capacity.

In an interview, actress Lesley-Ann Brandt stated that production for the fifth season was "99% finished", with production all completed except for half of the final episode before suspending production due to the COVID-19 pandemic. Production resumed on September 24, 2020, to finish the final episode of the fifth season and begin production of the sixth season.

=== Casting ===
In February 2015, Tom Ellis was cast as Lucifer Morningstar, while Tom Kapinos was attached to write the pilot, directed by Len Wiseman. Approximately one month after, Lauren German was cast as LAPD-detective Chloe Decker. Lina Esco was originally cast as Maze (Mazikeen), but the role was later recast with Lesley-Ann Brandt. Kevin Alejandro portrayed Dan. The following year in June, Tricia Helfer was cast as Lucifer and Amenadiel's mother, Charlotte, and she was to appear in multiple episodes in the second season. The character was promoted to series regular in July. Aimee Garcia was also cast as a regular in the second season, playing L.A.P.D.'s forensic scientist Ella Lopez. In August, Michael Imperioli was cast as angel Uriel. For the fourth season, Graham McTavish and Inbar Lavi were cast as Father Kinley and Eve respectively. For season 5, Tom Ellis was also cast as Michael, Lucifer's twin brother with "a chip on his shoulder" and Matthew Bohrer was cast as Donovan Glover, a character who appeared in only one episode.

In 2020, Tom Ellis and other stars of the series were reported to have signed up for a sixth season, but a contract dispute led Ellis not to be officially signed on until late May.

=== Filming ===
Although the pilot was shot on location in Los Angeles, the rest of the first season and the entirety of the second were filmed in Vancouver, British Columbia, with some exterior filming in Los Angeles. Production relocated to California beginning with the third season, taking advantage of tax incentives provided by the California Film Commission under its "Program 2.0" initiative and spending $92.1 million on production. Season four was also shot on location in Los Angeles, as well as at Warner Bros.' Burbank studio lot, spending $35.8 million on production.

=== Music ===
The opening theme is a six-second clip from "Being Evil Has a Price", performed by the band Heavy Young Heathens. In a lawsuit filed against Warner Bros., the song's composers, Robert and Aron Marderosian, claim the song has been used without giving them proper credit or a licensing agreement.

Several episodes include musical performances by Tom Ellis, although he commented in interviews that while it is his vocals, the piano accompaniment seen on screen is not actually his. Neil Gaiman is a fan of David Bowie, and some of Bowie's music has been used on the series (the illustration of Lucifer in the comics is also based on David Bowie).

Simultaneously, with the release of Season 5 Part One in 2020, an official soundtrack was released by WaterTower Music, containing cast recordings from all then-released seasons. In 2021 an additional soundtrack with all songs from the "musical" episode "Bloody Celestial Karaoke Jam" was published as well.

== Release ==
DVD and Blu-ray release dates
Season
Season	DVD region 1	DVD region 2	DVD region 4
1	August 23, 2016	October 17, 2016	October 19, 2016
2	August 22, 2017	August 21, 2017	August 23, 2017
3	August 28, 2018	September 3, 2018	August 29, 2018
4	May 12, 2020	July 13, 2020	May 20, 2020
5	May 31, 2022	June 27, 2022	June 15, 2022
6	September 13, 2022	October 3, 2022	TBA

In its first three seasons, Lucifer aired in the United States on Fox, in 720p, high definition, and Dolby Digital 5.1 surround sound. The first and second seasons aired on Monday at 9 pm ET, before moving to the 8 pm time slot on Monday for the third season. Hulu owned the exclusive streaming rights in the United States, with each season released after its broadcast on Fox but moved over to Netflix in December 2018.

CTV holds the broadcast rights for Canada. In the United Kingdom it aired on the television channel FOX until the channel was cut prior to Season 4. Subsequently, Amazon Video holds first-run broadcasting rights, with each episode airing less than 24 hours after the US broadcast. The series aired on FX in Australia before moving to FOX8 during its third season when FX closed and on TVNZ1 in New Zealand.

Beginning in August 2022, TNT aired the series until April 2024.

Lucifer was released on Blu-ray on January 20, 2026.

== Reception ==
=== Ratings ===
Viewership and ratings per season of Lucifer
Season	Timeslot (ET)	Episodes	First aired		Last aired		TV season	Viewership rank	Avg. viewers (millions)
Season	Timeslot (ET)	Episodes	Date	Viewers (millions)	Date	Viewers (millions)	TV season	Viewership rank	Avg. viewers (millions)
1	Monday 9:00 pm	13	January 25, 2016	7.16	April 26, 2016	3.89	2015–16	62	7.17
2	Monday 9:00 pm	18	September 19, 2016	4.36	May 29, 2017	3.31	2016–17	85	5.13
3	Monday 8:00 pm	26	October 2, 2017	3.92	May 28, 2018	2.42	2017–18	119	4.16

Following the release of the second half of the fifth season on Netflix, Lucifer was near the top of Nielsen's streaming ratings, garnering 1.8 billion viewing minutes from May 31 to June 6, 2021.

=== Critical response ===
Critical response of Lucifer
Season	Rotten Tomatoes	Metacritic
1	49% (43 reviews)	49 (24 reviews)
2	100% (9 reviews)	—N/a
3	100% (7 reviews)	—N/a
4	100% (9 reviews)	—N/a
5	81% (27 reviews)	—N/a
6	100% (13 reviews)	—N/a

The pilot episode was screened in July at the 2015 San Diego Comic-Con. The pilot was met positively by the viewers, with Bleeding Cool's Dan Wickline praising the episode, saying that "the show itself is enjoyable because of the great dialogue and flawless delivery from its lead" and "this version of Lucifer refuses to take almost anything seriously and the show is better for it". Max Nicholson of IGN rated the pilot episode a 6.9/10, praising Tom Ellis's performance as Lucifer and the lighthearted tone of the series, but criticizing the series for essentially being another crime procedural series.

The first season received mixed reviews. The review aggregator website Rotten Tomatoes reports that 49% of critics gave it a positive review based on 43 reviews, with an average rating of 5.40 out of 10. The site's critics' consensus reads: "Lucifer's got sex appeal, but the show's hackneyed cop procedural format undermines a potentially entertaining premise". Metacritic, which uses a weighted average, assigned a score of 49 out of 100 based on 24 critics, indicating "mixed or average reviews".

Critics were much more receptive to the rest of the series. The second season has 100% on Rotten Tomatoes based on 9 reviews, with an average rating of 7.9 out of 10. The site's critics consensus reads: "Tom Ellis continues to shine as the Morning Star [sic], though perhaps he could fly higher if he weren't locked into such a familiar format".

Ed Power of The Telegraph gave the second-season premiere a 4 out 5, stating that "it is entirely beguiled by its own preposterousness". Bernard Boo of We Got This Covered gave the premiere 3.5 out of 5 stars, saying: "Lucifer's second season gets off to a nice start, building on the show's strengths while retaining some of the weaknesses. It remains an unapologetically sordid, demonically fun hour of TV". LaToya Ferguson of The A.V. Club gave it a B grade, calling the episode funny with "genuinely funny moments to come from" and saying that the premiere "starts the season off on a good note". She praised Tom Ellis's performance calling it "pitch perfect".

=== Awards and nominations ===
Year	Award	Category	Nominee(s)	Result	Ref.
2016	Teen Choice Awards	Choice TV: Breakout Show	Lucifer	Nominated	
2016	Teen Choice Awards	Choice TV: Breakout Star	Tom Ellis (for Lucifer Morningstar)	Nominated	
2017	Bisexual Representation Awards	Best Bisexual Representation by a Lead Character – Male	Tom Ellis (for Lucifer Morningstar)	Won	
2017	Dragon Awards	Best Science Fiction or Fantasy Series	Lucifer	Nominated	
2017	People's Choice Awards	Favorite TV Crime Drama	Lucifer	Nominated	
2017	Saturn Awards	Best Fantasy Television Series	Lucifer	Nominated	
2018	Bisexual Representation Awards	Best Bisexual Representation by a Lead Character – Male	Tom Ellis (for Lucifer Morningstar)	Won	
2018	Bisexual Representation Awards	Best Bisexual Representation by a TV Show	Lucifer	Won	
2021	American Society of Cinematographers Awards	Outstanding Achievement in Cinematography in an Episode of a One-Hour Television Series – Non-Commercial	Ken Glassing	Nominated	
2021	Critics' Choice Super Awards	Best Actor in a Superhero Series	Tom Ellis (for Lucifer Morningstar)	Nominated	
2021	Critics' Choice Super Awards	Best Superhero Series	Lucifer	Nominated	
2021	Critics' Choice Super Awards	Best Villain in a Series	Tom Ellis (for Michael Demiurgos)	Nominated	
2021	Hollywood Critics Association Awards	Best Actor in a Streaming Series, Comedy	Tom Ellis (for Lucifer Morningstar)	Nominated	
2021	Hollywood Critics Association Awards	Pop Culture Icon Award	Tom Ellis (for Lucifer Morningstar)	Won	
2021	Primetime Emmy Awards	Primetime Emmy Award for Outstanding Choreography (Scripted)	Lucifer	Nominated	

=== Censorship campaign ===
In May 2015, the American Family Association (AFA) website One Million Moms launched a petition to prevent the series' airing. The petition stated that the series would "glorify Satan as a caring, likable person in human flesh". The petition had 31,312 signatures by the series' premiere date. Posted the same date on the main AFA website, the petition garnered 134,331 signatures by the premiere date. In response to the petition, character creator Neil Gaiman commented on his Tumblr page:

Ah. It seems like only yesterday (but it was 1991) that the "Concerned Mothers of America" announced that they were boycotting The Sandman because it contained lesbian, gay, bisexual, and trans characters. It was Wanda that upset them most: the idea of a trans-woman in a comic book... They told us they were organizing a boycott of The Sandman, which they would only stop if we wrote to the American Family Association and promised to reform. I wonder if they noticed it didn't work last time, either...

Regardless of the campaign, Fox renewed the series in April 2016 for a second season.

The campaign was referred to in a joke in the second season episode "Sympathy for the Goddess", when Lucifer is told he is in danger, he asks "Is it the Yakuza? The Nephilim? One Million Moms?"

=== Cancellation reactions ===
In May 2018, following the series' initial cancellation, co-showrunner Joe Henderson indicated that the third-season finale would feature a "huge cliffhanger" that was meant to deter Fox from cancelling the series and encouraged fans to "make noise" with the hashtag #SaveLucifer. Fans, as well as the cast and crew, rallied on Twitter and #SaveLucifer soon became the #1 trending topic. A second hashtag, #PickUpLucifer, emerged as a trending topic as well. An online petition also began circulating aimed at renewing Lucifer for a fourth season on a new network. Warner Bros. Television subsequently began shopping the series around to premium cable and streaming services. Later in June, Netflix picked up the series for a fourth season. The penultimate episode of the fourth season is titled "Save Lucifer" in honor of the campaign.

== Arrowverse ==
Lucifer Morningstar makes a cameo appearance in The CW's Arrowverse crossover event "Crisis on Infinite Earths", which spanned the TV series Arrow, The Flash, Supergirl, Batwoman, and Legends of Tomorrow. The scene of his cameo occurs five years before the events of Lucifer and retroactively establishes the world of the series as Earth-666. The scene confirms that Lucifer is aware of the multiverse, and he shares some history with John Constantine involving Mazikeen.

== See also ==
- List of films about angels
