= Ildy Modrovich =

American screenwriter and television

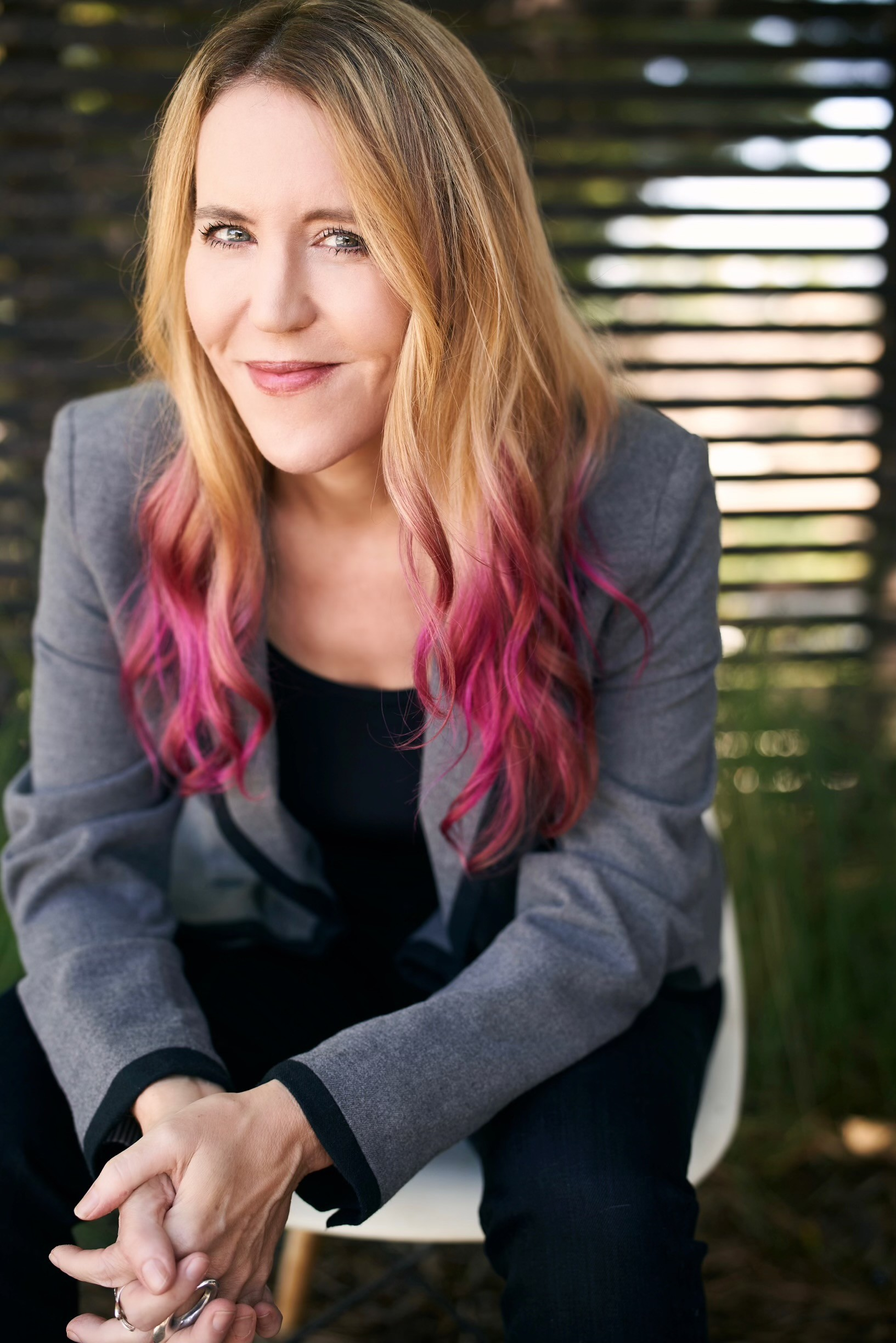
Writer Ildy Modrovich

Ildy Modrovich is an American screenwriter and television showrunner. Her most prominent past credits include CSI: Miami, for which she has written twenty-two episodes, Forever and Californication. Modrovich wrote, produced and was the co-showrunner for the series Lucifer which aired on Fox for the first three seasons and was then picked up by Netflix for a fourth, fifth and sixth season. Lucifer's sixth season premiered its final 10 episodes on Netflix September 10, 2021.

Modrovich was also the lead singer of the Los Angeles–based rock band The Heavy Woolies.
