= B&K Corporation =

Chinese biopharmaceutical company

B&K Corporation Limited
- Native name: 青城新藥生物科技（青島）股份有限公司
- Type: Public company
- Traded as: SEHK: 2396
- Industry: Biopharmaceutical
- Founded: 2012
- Headquarters: Qingdao, China
- Key people: Jia Lijia (Chairperson and Executive Director); Wang Kelong (President and Executive Director, capital markets)
- Products: Platelet-derived growth factor (PDGF)-based therapeutics

B&K Corporation Limited (Traditional Chinese: 青城新藥生物科技（青島）股份有限公司, SEHK: 2396) is a China-based biopharmaceutical company founded in 2012 and headquartered in Qingdao. The company is engaged in the research, development and commercialisation of protein-based therapeutics, with a primary focus on platelet-derived growth factor (PDGF) drugs for wound healing indications.

The joint sponsors of the offering were Huatai Financial Holdings (Hong Kong) and CITIC Securities (Hong Kong).

== History ==
B&K Corporation Limited was founded in 2012 in Qingdao, China, and commenced research and development of PDGF drugs in 2013. The company subsequently established a research and development centre in Beijing and a laboratory in Hong Kong.

Between 2021 and 2023, the company completed three financing rounds, raising a total of approximately RMB405 million. Investors included Qingdao High-Tech and CDH Investment. Following the Series B round in 2023, the company's post-money valuation reached RMB3.3 billion.

In July 2026, the company officially changed its Chinese name from "華芢生物" to "青城新藥".

== Leadership ==
Jia Lijia serves as chairperson and executive director of the company. Wang Kelong serves as president and executive director, with responsibilities encompassing capital markets.

== Scientific background ==
Platelet-derived growth factor (PDGF) is a signalling protein involved in wound healing, tissue repair, and angiogenesis. Research has established that PDGF stimulates chemotaxis and proliferation in monocytes, macrophages and fibroblasts, playing a key regulatory role in the tissue repair cascade. Studies have further shown that exogenous recombinant PDGF-BB significantly accelerates wound closure in both incisional and excisional wound models. Other growth factors, including transforming growth factor-β, have also been studied in experimental wound-healing models.

The only PDGF-based drug currently approved by a major regulatory authority is becaplermin, sold under the brand name Regranex, a recombinant human PDGF-BB gel approved by the U.S. Food and Drug Administration (FDA) in 1997 for the treatment of diabetic neuropathic foot ulcers. As of the date of this article, no PDGF drug has been approved for commercial sale in China.

== Pipeline ==
As of 31 December 2025, the company's pipeline consisted of ten drug candidates covering 14 indications across three platforms. Seven candidates are PDGF-based, with the remainder comprising mRNA, ASO, and Tβ4 candidates. Wound healing indications under development include thermal burns, diabetic foot ulcers (DFUs), fresh wounds, pressure ulcers, radiation ulcers, dry eye syndrome, corneal injury, photodermatitis, alopecia, haemorrhoids, and gastric ulcers.

=== Pro-101-1 (thermal burns) ===
Pro-101-1 is a topical PDGF-BB gel candidate for the treatment of thermal burns. The company received approval from China's National Medical Products Administration (NMPA) to commence Phase IIa clinical trials in June 2022, which were completed in May 2023. The Phase IIb clinical trial reached last patient out in April 2025, and the clinical report for deep second-degree burns was finalised in December 2025. As of May 2026, Pro-101-1 had enrolled the first patient in its Phase IIIa clinical trial for deep second-degree burns in China. The U.S. FDA has confirmed that Pro-101-1 is eligible for approval via the Section 351(a) biologics BLA pathway.

=== Pro-101-2 (diabetic foot ulcers) ===
Pro-101-2 is a topical PDGF-BB gel candidate for the treatment of DFUs. The company received IND approval from NMPA in July 2021 and completed Phase I clinical trials in October 2021. The Phase II clinical trial was initiated in February 2022, with the first patient enrolled in December 2024. As of 31 December 2025, the Phase II trial was ongoing in China.

== See also ==
- Platelet-derived growth factor
