= Joe Henderson (showrunner) =

American television producer

Joe Henderson is an American screenwriter and television producer. He is best known for being the showrunner and an executive producer of the television series Lucifer (2016–2021), which is based on the DC Comics character created by Neil Gaiman, Sam Kieth, and Mike Dringenberg.

== Career ==
Henderson has worked in television as a writer and producer on scripted drama series. He joined Lucifer during its early seasons and later assumed the role of showrunner. In this capacity, he was responsible for overseeing the series' creative direction, including story development and production management.

Following the series' cancellation by Fox after its third season, Lucifer was revived by Netflix. Henderson continued as showrunner during the show's run on the streaming service, where it produced additional seasons before concluding with its sixth season in 2021. In that same year, Henderson announced to co-write the pilot episode for a TV adaptation of the graphic novel Shadecraft, alongside writing the live-action adaptation of Pokémon.

In October 2025, he announced to be the writer and showrunner of an adult animated television series based on the Energon Universe comics by Skybound Entertainment and Hasbro.

== Filmography ==
=== Television ===
- Lucifer (2016–2021) – Writer, executive producer, showrunner
- Shadecraft (TBA) – Co-writer (pilot)
- Pokémon live-action series (TBA) – Writer, showrunner
- Energon Universe animated series (TBA) – Writer, showrunner
