= Brother's Keeper (software) =

Genealogy software

- Developer: John Steed
- Initial release: 1988; 38 years ago
- Stable release: 7.6.2 / January 8, 2026; 4 months ago
- Operating system: Windows
- Available in: 20 languages
- Type: Genealogy software
- License: Shareware
- Website: www.bkwin.org

Brother's Keeper is a genealogy software program for Windows.

The program functions as a database, a research planner and task organizer, a data analyzer, a chart producer, and a report writer. The software enables export and import in the GEDCOM specification for exchanging genealogical data.

Brother's Keeper used Btrieve as the underlying database engine before version 7.

Brother's Keeper has an email list for user support.

== Languages ==
Brother's Keeper is available in the following languages: English, Norwegian, French (Canadian), French (Belgium), German, Danish, Icelandic and Czech, Dutch, Dutch (Belgium), Estonian, Slovenian, Slovak, Swedish, Finnish, Russian, Polish, Catalan, Portuguese, and Afrikaans.
