= Lucifer Morningstar (Lucifer) =

Character from the Fox series Lucifer

- Lucifer character
- Tom Ellis as Lucifer Morningstar
- First appearance: "Pilot" (2016)
- Last appearance: "Partners Til the End" (2021)
- Based on: Lucifer by; Neil Gaiman; Sam Keith; Mike Dringenberg; The Devil; of Christian theology
- Adapted by: Tom Kapinos
- Portrayed by: Tom Ellis

In-universe information
- Full name: Lucifer Morningstar
- Occupation: Healer of Hell (current); Ruler of Hell (former); Nightclub owner (former); Police consultant (former)
- Family: God (father); Amenadiel (brother); Azrael (sister); Michael (twin brother); Uriel (brother); Remiel (sister); Gabriel (brother); Zadkiel (brother); Raphael (brother); Various angels (siblings); Charlie (nephew)
- Spouse: Lilith Morningstar (ex-wife of Adam)
- Significant others: Eve (ex-girlfriend); Mazikeen (ex-lover); Chloe Decker (girlfriend)
- Children: Aurora "Rory" Morningstar (daughter)

Lucifer Morningstar, known as Samael before his banishment from Heaven, is the titular protagonist of the urban fantasy comedy-drama series Lucifer (2016–2021). The character is portrayed by Welsh actor Tom Ellis and is an alternate version of Lucifer Morningstar, one of the supporting characters of Neil Gaiman's comic book series The Sandman, published by DC Comics; both are based on the Devil from Christianity. The series follows Lucifer after he abandons his post as the ruler of Hell and arrives on Earth, where he settles in Los Angeles to run a nightclub with the demon Mazikeen; he later becomes a civilian consultant for the LAPD, leading him to meet his soulmate, detective Chloe Decker.

The character was adapted for television by Joe Henderson as the showrunner for a series based on the Sandman character Lucifer, with Ellis cast in the title role in February 2015. Ellis' performance has been praised by critics and the character has become a fan favorite. He reprised his role as Lucifer in the 2020 Arrowverse crossover event Crisis on Infinite Earths, which established that Lucifer takes place on "Earth-666" in an alternate universe within the wider multiverse.

== Characterization ==
=== Overview ===
Samael is a fallen archangel who was banished from Heaven after attempting a failed rebellion against his father, being sent to Hell as its new ruler and later changing his name to Lucifer. He holds a deep resentment towards his father for banishing him, as well as his mother for doing nothing to stop it. In 2011, Lucifer becomes bored with his life in Hell, so he abdicates his throne and travels to Los Angeles to run his own high-end nightclub called Lux. At one point, John Constantine assists him in retrieving the demon Mazikeen from Hell so she can continue serving as his bodyguard; he would later repay this debt by helping Constantine recover Oliver Queen's soul from Purgatory. In 2016, while still running Lux, Lucifer becomes a civilian consultant for the LAPD and meets detective Chloe Decker.

=== Personality ===
Lucifer never lies and is therefore always honest about the fact that he is Satan, though very few humans take his claims seriously and instead view him as a wealthy eccentric. He convinces them by showing them his true demonic appearance, which he nicknames his "Devil face". Knowing that the sight of his true face can instantly send humans insane, he usually hides it unless aiming to frighten evildoers as he does not want to risk harming those he cares about. He is a heavy drinker, smoker, and drug user, none of which have any negative effects on him because he is not human. He is extremely sexually active and pansexual, with his celestial nature making him irresistible to almost all humans for reasons they cannot explain; he has had sex with billions of humans, all of whom cite him as the greatest they have had.

Lucifer has visited Earth multiple times throughout the course of human history, though each visit ended when his brother Amenadiel inevitably escorted him back to Hell. With the ability to shapeshift, Lucifer has tried many different human appearances and voices during his visits, and permanently settled on the persona of a suave and well-spoken English man in his 30s after he discovered that humans were much easier to charm when he appeared to them in this form. His human self is tall and athletic with a slim build, olive skin, neat black hair and sideburns, and light stubble. By the fourth season, he gained some muscle and grew his facial hair slightly longer. He is always dressed in one of his many bespoke three-piece suits and often experiments with the colour scheme, though his signature suit is black with a white shirt and red pocket square. He has sported many different shoes, most frequently black Chelsea boots or black Louboutins with the trademark red sole. He drives a black 1962 Chevrolet Corvette with the custom license plate "FALL1N1" ("fallen one").

=== Abilities ===
As an angel, Lucifer possesses several supernatural traits and abilities. He can make humans tell him their secret aspirations by looking into their eyes and simply asking them what they "truly desire", a power that Chloe nicknames his "mojo". Despite some humans believing this is hypnosis or telepathy, it is neither, and is dependent upon whether the target is a "simple" or "complex" person as a more complex person will take more time and effort before giving in. Chloe is the only human immune to both Lucifer's charm and mojo, and even accidentally steals his ability for a brief time when they become a couple. Lucifer can speak every human language, but cannot read all of them. He is an expert singer, pianist, and dancer who is often seen performing for guests at Lux. He has also displayed some skill on bass guitar, but his artistic abilities are not universal; for example, he is unable to draw or sketch anything more detailed than crude stick figures.

Lucifer possesses superhuman strength, able to easily throw adult men long distances or lift them several feet in the air by the neck with one hand, even if they are much larger than himself. He can also punch through brick walls and hold an accelerating car still, though he must be adequately braced for the latter. He is immortal and cannot feel pain. He can be killed like a human by traditional means such as shooting and stabbing, but will simply wake up moments later with no sign of physical damage, having spent those moments being sent back down to Hell before returning to his body. However, he can be permanently injured or killed by Mazikeen's karambits, which were forged in Hell and can harm any celestial being. He is also, like all other celestial beings, vulnerable to his sister Azrael's blade (the main part of the legendary Flaming Sword) as she is the angel of death.

Lucifer originally had a pair of angelic wings, which he instructed Maze to cut off with her karambits some time after he arrived in Los Angeles, leaving him with permanent scars on his back. Due to angels being able to literally self-actualize, his wings grow back at the end of the second season as he starts to experience emotional growth. By the end of the fourth season, his realization that he hates himself causes his wings to revert to a bat-like demonic appearance, though they later regain their angelic look when Chloe finally convinces him that she loves him for who he is. The wings are even more durable than his body, able to resist damage such as gunfire, and can generate a gust strong enough to knock a human over when flapped.

Lucifer's principal weakness is that his invulnerability fails whenever Chloe is in his immediate vicinity, though it is not known exactly how close she needs to be for this to happen. If he is mortally injured when Chloe is nearby, he can die like a human. This effect renders him susceptible to even the most minor injuries, such as cutting his hand or stubbing his toe. As soon as Chloe is far enough away from him, his body again becomes impervious to damage and he instantly recovers from non-fatal injuries. He remained invulnerable near Chloe during their initial time together, with his weakness manifesting only after they shared a moment of emotional vulnerability when she saw the scars on his back from cutting off his wings. Her presence does not deprive Lucifer of any of his other supernatural traits, such as his strength or mojo, suggesting that his physical vulnerability is a manifestation of the emotional vulnerability Chloe triggers in him.

== Storylines ==
=== Season 1 and 2 ===
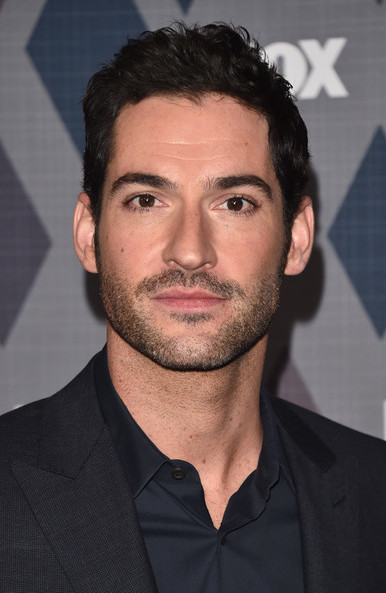
Lucifer and his twin brother Michael were portrayed by Welsh actor Tom Ellis

Lucifer is shown to have a complicated relationship with his family. His brother Amenadiel tries to force him to return to his Hell duties, but he steadfastly refuses to comply with his father's wishes. When the container holding his wings was stolen in the episode "Favorite Son", Lucifer recovers them only to set them on fire as a sign of his rebellion against God's wishes, but in the season finale, Lucifer prays to God to save Chloe's life after he is shot, willing to do anything in exchange. God gives him a vision: Lucifer's mother has escaped Hell and it is his duty to bring her back.

While Lucifer initially intends to help his mother return to Heaven so she and his father will destroy each other, he finally decides to send her to another universe, where she could create her own world free from God's influence. Also, in season 2's finale, his wings were restored. On Earth, Lucifer creates a connection with Detective Chloe Decker, who's immune to his abilities. After Chloe kisses him in the season 2 episode "Stewardess Interruptus", he discovers she is the result of a miracle done by Amenadiel on God's orders and pushes her away for her own good.

=== Season 3 ===
Lucifer has to deal with the new precinct lieutenant, Marcus Pierce. When he discovers Pierce is Cain the first murderer, he agrees to help him find a way to die to annoy his father, but backs off after Chloe is in danger. He also struggles with his feelings for her when she starts dating Pierce, and his inability to express them. He also loses his "Devil Face" at the beginning of the season. In the penultimate episode, "Quintessential Deckerstar", Lucifer and Chloe kiss again after he confesses his feelings for her, but this happens just before he kills Cain and recovers his true "Devil Face", which Chloe finally sees in the season finale.

=== Season 4 ===
Lucifer has to deal with the aftermath of Chloe finally learning the truth (resulting in her hesitantly conspiring with a priest named Father Kinley to send Lucifer back to Hell) and the return of Eve, a former lover of his. Meanwhile, Amenadiel learns that Linda is pregnant with their half angel son. Due to Chloe's betrayal, Lucifer resumes his relationship with Eve, who claims to be in love with him and accepts him for who he is. As the season progresses, Lucifer's growing hatred of himself cause his angel wings to become demon wings and he gains a more demonic alternate form. At the same time, Father Kinley reveals to Chloe a prophecy that Lucifer and his first love will unleash evil upon the Earth. Meanwhile, with Eve at his side urging him on, Lucifer goes back to his old habits, going as far as brutally crippling a criminal as punishment. He later realizes he doesn't like who he is around Eve and breaks up with her. After Eve kills Kinley and summons the demon Dromos into his body, Lucifer has to rescue his nephew Charlie, Linda and Amenadiel's newborn son, scaring the demons into returning to Hell using his full demonic form before Chloe. Chloe finally accepts Lucifer completely, even after seeing his demonic form and admits her love for him. Lucifer then decides that he must return to Hell to keep the demons in line, recognizing that Chloe was his true love, even if Eve was his first. After a tearful goodbye and last kiss with Chloe, Lucifer uses his wings, angelic white once again, to return to his throne in Hell.

=== Season 5 ===
Lucifer returns from Hell to confront his twin brother Michael, who attempts to steal his identity, leaving Amenadiel in his place. Later he learns from Amenadiel that God relieved him from his duties as the guardian of Hell and moves forward with his relationship with Chloe. After his father retired, he began competing with his brother Michael for the title of God. He fought his brother to the death, but the fight was stopped after Michael killed Chloe. Despite the fact that Lucifer would burn if he flew to heaven, he went there to resurrect Chloe. Once there, he helped her get back to earth, and died himself, but was resurrected and returned to earth, stopping Chloe from killing Michael. He finished the duel with his brother, but did not kill him, only cut off his wings, saying that everyone deserves a second chance. After this he was recognized and accepted as God by demons and other angels, including Michael.

=== Season 6 ===
Lucifer and Chloe are confused to discover they have a daughter named Aurora "Rory" Morningstar, who has traveled back in time to kill Lucifer as revenge because he will one day abandon the family and return to Hell, leaving Chloe to live the rest of her natural life alone. Rory later discovers that Lucifer leaves so that he can redeem all the lost souls in Hell and allow them to reach Heaven, prompting her to finally accept his decision; Lucifer and Chloe share an emotional goodbye before he leaves. Years later, Chloe dies from old age with Rory at her side and goes to Heaven. Amenadiel, who is now God, chauffeurs Chloe to Hell so she can live out the rest of eternity with Lucifer and help him redeem lost souls.

== Creation and conception ==
Neil Gaiman's Lucifer was partly inspired by David Bowie, but the show's creators decided against trying to mimic Bowie. Tom Ellis saw the character as a sort of Oscar Wilde or Noël Coward character "with added rock and roll spirit", approaching his portrayal as if he were the "lovechild of Noël Coward and Mick Jagger, with a dash of Terry-Thomas".

== Reception ==
Tom Ellis received praise for his performance. Bleeding Cool's Dan Wickline offered praise to his "sarcastic, wittingly charming" take on the Devil and stated that "the show itself is enjoyable because of the great dialogue and flawless delivery from its lead [...] this version of Lucifer refuses to take almost anything seriously and the show is better for it". Max Nicholson of IGN rated the pilot episode a 6.9/10, praising Ellis' performance and the light-hearted tone of the series, but criticizing the show for otherwise being yet another crime procedural series.
