= List of Lucifer characters =

This is an overview of the regular, recurring, and other characters of the Fox (seasons 1–3) and Netflix (seasons 4–6) television series Lucifer.

== Overview ==
Character	Actor	Seasons						
Character	Actor	1	2	3	4	5		6
Character	Actor	1	2	3	4	Part 1	Part 2	6
Lucifer Morningstar (né Samael)	Tom Ellis	Main	Main	Main	Main	Main	Main	Main
Michael	Tom Ellis					Main	Main	Guest
Chloe Decker	Lauren German	Main	Main	Main	Main	Main	Main	Main
Daniel "Dan" Espinoza	Kevin Alejandro	Main	Main	Main	Main	Main	Main	Main
Amenadiel	D.B. Woodside	Main	Main	Main	Main	Main	Main	Main
Mazikeen "Maze Smith" of the Lilim	Lesley-Ann Brandt	Main	Main	Main	Main	Main	Main	Main
Lilith / Lily Rose	Lesley-Ann Brandt					Main (Note: L. Scott Caldwell portrays Lilith's elderly form.)		
Beatrice "Trixie" Espinoza	Scarlett Estevez	Main	Main	Main	Main	Recurring	Recurring	Recurring
Dr. Linda Martin	Rachael Harris	Main	Main	Main	Main	Main	Main	Main
Malcolm Graham	Kevin Rankin	Main						
"Mum" / Goddess	Tricia Helfer	Stand-in	Main				Guest	
Charlotte Richards	Tricia Helfer		Main	Main				Guest
Shirley Monroe	Tricia Helfer					Guest		
Ella Lopez	Aimee Garcia		Main	Main	Main	Main	Main	Main
Cain / Marcus Pierce	Tom Welling			Main				
Eve	Inbar Lavi				Main		Guest	Recurring
Aurora "Rory" Decker-Morningstar	Brianna Hildebrand							Main

== Family tree ==
"Mum"; Goddess	"Dad"; God
Lilith	Adam	Eve
Dromos	Mazikeen of Lilim "Maze Smith"	Cain; Marcus Pierce	Abel; Bree Garland	Humankind	"Rae-Rae" Azrael; The Angel of Death
Michael Demiurgos; The Archangel	Uriel	Gabriel	Amenadiel; The Firstborn	Dr. Linda Martin	Ella Lopez
Remiel	Raphael	Castiel	Charlie	Adriana Nassar	John Decker	Penelope Decker
Malcolm Graham	Elliot Richards	Charlotte Richards	Daniel "Dan" Espinoza	Chloe Decker	Lucifer Morningstar (né Samael)
Micah Richards	Ivy Richards	Beatrice "Trixie" Espinoza	Aurora "Rory" Decker-Morningstar

== Main characters ==
=== Lucifer Morningstar / Samael ===
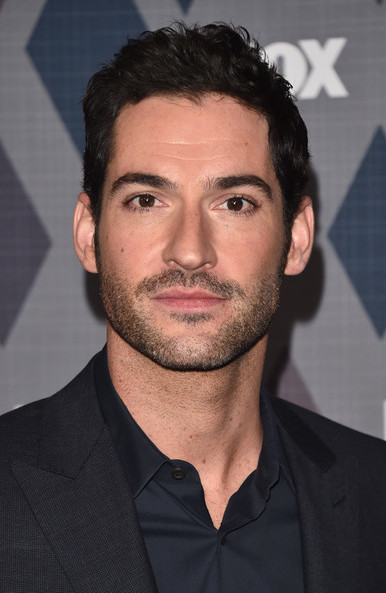
Tom Ellis

Samael "Lucifer Morningstar" The Devil, Ruler of Hell
- Lucifer character
- First appearance: "Pilot"; January 25, 2016
- Portrayed by: Tom Ellis

In-universe information
- Full name: Lucifer Morningstar (né Samael)
- Nicknames: Luci (pronounced "Lucy"); Luce; Lu
- Species: Celestial being Archangel; Fallen angel (formerly)
- Gender: Male
- Occupation: Civilian consultant, LAPD; Owner of the LUX nightclub Lord of Hell (formerly) "Helper of lost souls"
- Family: God of Creation (father); Goddess of Creation (mother); Amenadiel (older brother); Uriel (younger brother, deceased); Azrael (younger sister); Remiel (younger sister, deceased); Michael Demiurgos (twin brother); Gabriel (younger sister)
- Significant others: Chloe Decker (girlfriend); Linda Martin (sex-only, season 1); Eve (season 4)
- Children: Aurora "Rory" Decker-Morningstar

Lucifer Morningstar is a fictional character and the protagonist of the TV series Lucifer. He is portrayed by Tom Ellis. Neil Gaiman's Lucifer was partly inspired by David Bowie, but the show's creators decided against trying to mimic Bowie. Tom Ellis saw the character as a sort of Oscar Wilde or Noël Coward character "with added rock and roll spirit", approaching his portrayal as if he were the "lovechild of Noël Coward and Mick Jagger, with a dash of British actor Terry-Thomas".

Lucifer is a fallen angel who, after leading an unsuccessful rebellion against Heaven, was banished to Hell by God to serve as its Lord. Lucifer resents his father for this, and his mother for having done nothing about it. Lucifer's angelic name is Samael, meaning "Wrath/Venom of God" (prophetic of his fall from grace), whereas his name of choice, Lucifer, means "Light Bringer".

In 2011, Lucifer became bored with his life, so he abdicated his throne and relocated to Los Angeles to open a high-end nightclub called Lux. He was assisted by John Constantine in retrieving Mazikeen from Hell so she could continue serving as his bodyguard. Lucifer later repaid this debt by helping Constantine and his allies recover Oliver Queen's soul from Purgatory. After five years, Lucifer becomes a civilian consultant for the Los Angeles Police Department in the pilot episode, while still running Lux.

Lucifer is open about his identity as the Devil, always telling people who he is. However, few take his claims seriously unless he shows them his "Devil Face": his true, demonic appearance (the embodiment of his negative emotions), which he usually does to frighten evildoers. Lucifer is highly sexual and is irresistible to most people.

As a fallen angel, Lucifer possesses several supernatural traits and abilities. He has superhuman strength, enough to throw a grown man several yards or hold an accelerating car in place (if he is adequately braced). Lucifer is immortal and his human body is highly durable; he can withstand gunfire or walk through a burning building without harm. He can, however, be injured by Mazikeen's mystical hell-forged karambit blades or the Blade of Azrael, which all celestial beings are vulnerable to (later revealed to be the main part of the legendary Flaming Sword).

Lucifer originally had a pair of angelic wings, which he had severed by Maze when he arrived in Los Angeles. These wings grew back at the end of season two (leading to the revelation that angels can Self-actualize, literally). The wings are as durable as Lucifer's body; they can resist gunfire and, when flapped, can generate a wind strong enough to knock down a human.

Lucifer also possesses the supernatural ability to make people reveal their hidden desires by simply making eye contact and asking them. It is neither hypnosis nor telepathy, and is dependent upon whenever the person it is being used upon is a simple or complex person: the more complex a person is, the more they can resist, and the more time and effort is needed to overcome their resistance. An added caveat is that Lucifer must maintain eye contact with the subject, and only Chloe Decker has been shown to be fully immune to the effect.

Lucifer's principal weakness is that he becomes vulnerable to harm whenever Chloe is close to him or in his immediate vicinity. If he is mortally injured when Chloe is nearby, it is possible for him to die just like any human. This effect even renders Lucifer susceptible to minor cuts or painfully stubbing his toe. Once Chloe is far enough away from him, Lucifer's body regains its durability, but in the pilot episode, he was still invulnerable near Chloe, and he did not begin to lose his durability until after a moment of emotional vulnerability, where Chloe sees the scars on Lucifer's back, where his wings were. Chloe's presence does not deprive Lucifer of any of his other supernatural traits, such as his strength. This suggests that Lucifer's physical vulnerability is a manifestation of his emotional vulnerability where Chloe is concerned.

Lucifer is shown to have a complicated relationship with his family. During season 1, his brother Amenadiel tries to force him to return to his throne in Hell, but he steadfastly refuses to comply with his father's wishes. When the container holding his wings is stolen in the episode "Favorite Son", Lucifer goes to great lengths to recover them, only to set them on fire as a sign of his rebellion against God's wishes. In the season finale, however, Lucifer prays to God to save Chloe's life after he is shot, willing to do anything in exchange. God gives him a vision: Lucifer's mother has escaped Hell and it is his duty to bring her back.

Season 2 shows his complicated relationship with his mother. While he initially intends to help her return to Heaven (so she and his father will destroy each other), he finally decides to send her to another universe, where she can create her own world free from God's influence. His wings are restored in season 2's finale, but he severs them again in season 3, seeing them as God trying to impose his will on him, but resigns himself to them after finding that they reappear every time he cuts them.

On Earth, Lucifer creates a connection with Detective Chloe Decker, who's immune to his abilities. In the first-season episode "Manly Whatnots", he encourages Chloe to shoot him so she would have proof he is the Devil, but the bullet wounds him, which is the first instance of Lucifer becoming vulnerable to physical harm when she is around. His growing feelings for her confuse him at first until he finally accepts he is in love with her, though he is unable to articulate his feelings. After Chloe kisses him in season 2 episode "Stewardess Interruptus", he discovers she is the result of a miracle performed by Amenadiel on God's orders and pushes her away for her own good.

In season 3, he has to deal with the new precinct lieutenant, Marcus Pierce. When he discovers Pierce is Cain the first murderer, he agrees to help him find a way to die in order to annoy his father, but backs off after Chloe is put in danger. He also struggles with his feelings for her when she starts dating Pierce, and his inability to express them. Midway through the season, he also loses his Devil Face. In the penultimate episode, "Quintessential Deckerstar", Lucifer and Chloe kiss again after he confesses his feelings for her, but this happens just before he kills Cain and recovers his Devil Face, which Chloe finally sees in the season finale.

In season 4, Lucifer has to deal with the aftermath of Chloe finally learning the truth and the return of Eve, his first-ever lover. Meanwhile, Amenadiel learns that Linda is pregnant with their half angel son. Due to Chloe's betrayal, Lucifer resumes his relationship with Eve, who claims to be in love with him and accepts him for who he is. As the season progresses, Lucifer's growing hatred of himself cause his angel wings to become demon wings and he gains a more demonic alternate form. At the same time, a priest, Father Kinley, reveals a prophecy that Lucifer and his first love will unleash evil upon the Earth. Meanwhile, with Eve at his side urging him on, Lucifer slips back into old habits, going as far as brutally crippling a criminal, but he later realizes he does not like who he is around Eve and breaks up with her.

In the season finale, after Eve kills Kinley and summons the demon Dromos into his body, Lucifer has to rescue his nephew, Charlie, Linda and Amenadiel's newborn son from Dromos and his demon allies, using his full demonic form (in full view of Chloe) to scare the demons into returning to Hell. Chloe finally accepts Lucifer completely, even after seeing his demonic form, and admits her love for him. Lucifer then decides to return to Hell to keep the demons in line, recognizing that Chloe was his true first love all along, not Eve. After a tearful goodbye and last kiss with Chloe, Lucifer uses his wings, angelic white once again, to return to his throne in Hell.

In season 5, Lucifer returns from Hell to confront his twin brother Michael, who attempts to steal his identity, leaving Amenadiel in his place. He later learns from Amenadiel that God relieved him from his duties as the guardian of Hell and moves forward with his relationship with Chloe. Lucifer and Amenadiel later confront Michael and Maze (who has turned against Lucifer), but the fight is stopped by God's intervention. After mending his relationship with his father, Lucifer battles with Michael for the right to succeed him, eventually winning and being recognized by his siblings as the new God.

In the final season, Lucifer (who is unsure about assuming his father's place) is attacked by Rory, a half-angel who is later revealed to be his and Chloe's future daughter, and who is angry with Lucifer for abandoning Chloe before she is born and never returning because of reasons her mother never revealed. Lucifer spends most of the season bonding with his daughter while trying to find out what drove him to leave her and Chloe; in the midst of this, he realizes that he is not fit to become God and relinquishes the position to Amenadiel. In the series finale, Lucifer discovers that he has the ability to redeem lost souls from Hell upon realizing that Dan ascended to heaven thanks to his advice. To ensure that the timeline is unaltered, Lucifer is forced to say goodbye to Chloe and Rory and return permanently to Hell, working as a therapist to help the humans there to ascend, and reuniting with Chloe after her death.

=== Chloe Decker ===
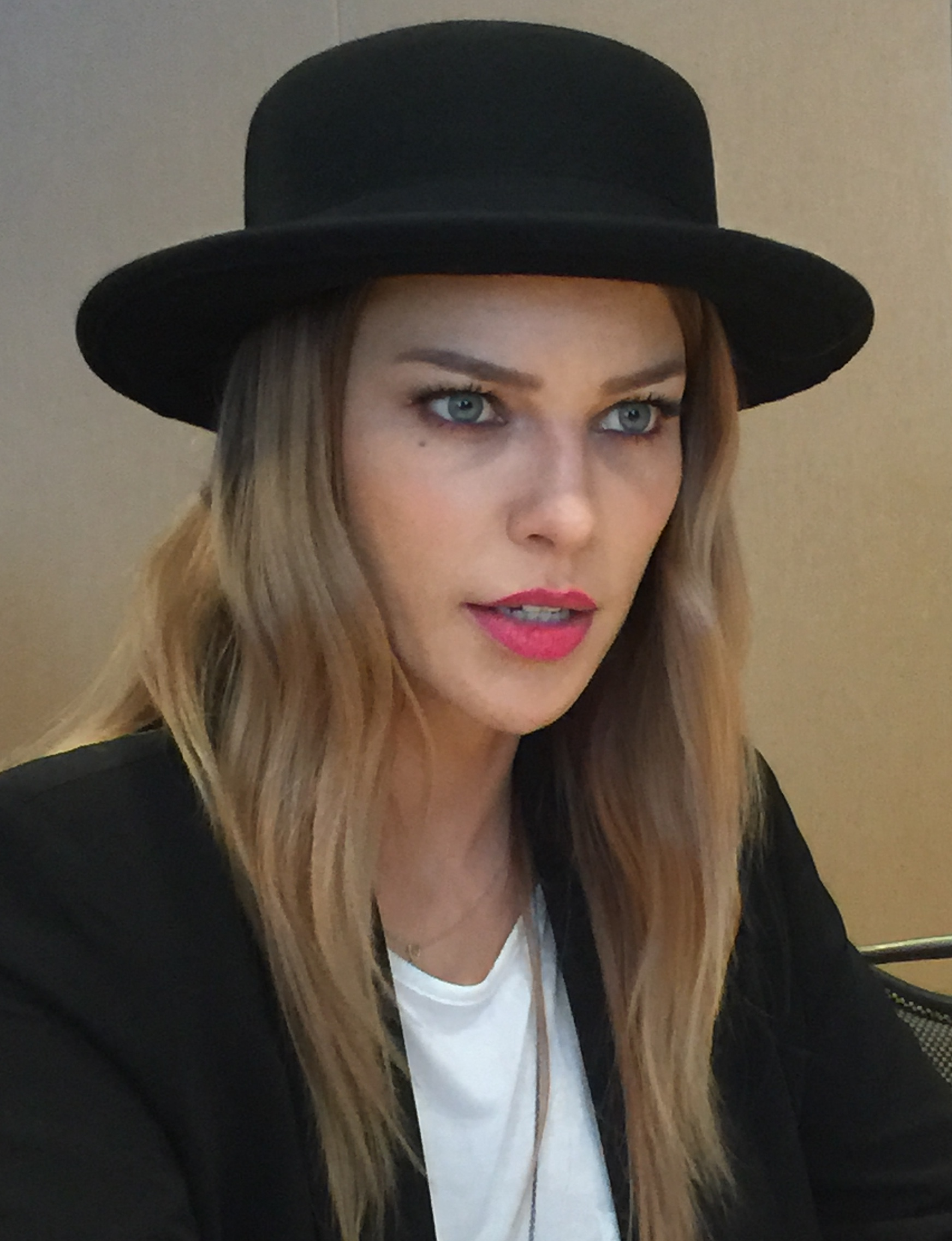
Lauren German

Chloe Decker
- Lucifer character
- First appearance: "Pilot"; January 25, 2016
- Portrayed by: Lauren German

In-universe information
- Full name: Chloe Jane Decker
- Alias: Chlo (Maze)
- Nickname: Detective (Lucifer)
- Species: Human
- Gender: Female
- Occupation: Homicide detective Police lieutenant (finale); Actress (former)
- Affiliation: LAPD
- Family: John Decker (father; deceased); Penelope Decker (mother)
- Spouse: Lucifer Morningstar (boyfriend)
- Significant others: Daniel Espinoza (ex-husband; deceased); Marcus Pierce (ex-fiancé; deceased)
- Children: Beatrice "Trixie" Espinoza; Aurora "Rory" Decker-Morningstar
- Nationality: American

Chloe Decker is a LAPD homicide detective and Lucifer's partner. She is portrayed by Lauren German.

She solves crimes with Lucifer after he takes an interest in her because she appears immune to his abilities. She, on her part, finds his "Lucifer-ness" both intriguing and hard to deal with. Due to an earlier incident concerning a cop shooting, she was ostracized by her fellow officers, resulting in her being partnered with Lucifer as her civilian consultant. Though she is against it at first, she warms up to him and agrees that his unconventional ways are useful, even if his personality often puts her nerves on edge. Lucifer frequently addresses her as "Detective" rather than by name.

In season 1, Chloe is separated from her husband, Dan, also an LAPD detective, with whom she has a daughter, Trixie. After an attempt to get back together was sabotaged by Malcolm[who?], they finally decide to divorce, though they remain good friends. Her father, John Decker, was a LAPD officer killed in the line of duty. Chloe's widowed mother Penelope is an actress, as was Chloe herself, briefly, but her only movie, Hot Tub High School, is now a source of embarrassment for her, as she had topless scenes in it. The events of season 2 reveal that Penelope was barren and Chloe's conception was the result of a miracle, performed by God with assistance from Amenadiel.

Though she initially denied any possibility of ever sleeping with Lucifer, despite his attempts at seduction, in the season 2 episode "Stewardess Interruptus", she realizes he has come to care for her as more than just a conquest and kisses him. After Lucifer discovers the truth about her birth, he quickly backpedals, believing he is protecting her. During season 3, she finds herself the object of affection of both Lucifer and Marcus Pierce. Though she becomes briefly engaged to the latter, she breaks it off and kisses Lucifer again in the penultimate episode, "Quintessential Deckerstar", after he finally confesses his feelings for her.

Chloe is highly skeptical of Lucifer's claims to be the Devil, but she is intrigued by the things she has seen him do, for which she struggles to find a logical explanation. In season 2's premiere, she tried to analyze a sample of Lucifer's blood to find out the truth, which forced Amenadiel to throw her off the trail by fabricating a plausible explanation for Lucifer's abilities. In the Season 3 finale, Chloe sees Lucifer's true face and finally realizes his claims were true.

The Season 4 premiere reveals that, following the revelation, Chloe took Trixie on a month-long trip to Italy. In Rome, she encountered Father Kinley, who counseled her that the best thing for Earth and Lucifer was for him to return to Hell. After questioning Lucifer and learning that he hated ruling Hell, Chloe realizes Lucifer really has changed from the church's vision of him and decides not to go through with the plan. Kinley, however, orchestrates events to try and force Lucifer to prove himself as evil as history claims; though Kinley's plan fails and he is arrested, Lucifer and Chloe's partnership is almost irreparably damaged by her betrayal. The two eventually make up, but they part ways again when Lucifer returns to Hell to keep the demons at bay.

In season 5, after Lucifer returns from Hell, the two resume their relationship, which is strained once she learns from Michael that she was created by God as a gift to him, but she eventually comes to accept it and the two become lovers. Chloe later supports Lucifer in his effort to become the new God and is devastated by the murder of Dan. Michael kills her during the final battle, and she is reunited with her father in Heaven before Lucifer sacrifices himself to resurrect her. Using Amenadiel's necklace, which imbues her with angelic strength, Chloe subdues Michael before Lucifer's selfless sacrifice resurrects him as the new God.

In season 6, Lucifer and Chloe continue to navigate their relationship, complicated by the arrival of their daughter Rory from the future. Rory reveals that in the near future, Lucifer will vanish from Earth for good, leaving Chloe to raise a bitter and angry Rory. After seeing her parents together and hearing about their relationship from the perspective of Linda Martin, Rory finally comes to an understanding of her father and reconciles with him.

In the series finale, Chloe and Lucifer work together to rescue Rory from Vincent Le Mec, Dan's murderer. Despite being severely wounded, Chloe refuses to be left behind and kills Le Mec. Having learned that Dan's soul made it into Heaven, Lucifer, Chloe, and Rory realize that Lucifer's true purpose is to help the souls of Hell release their guilt and achieve redemption, the true reason that he disappears from Earth for good. Before returning to her own time, Rory makes Lucifer promise not to change anything, and he departs for Hell shortly thereafter with Chloe's blessing, despite it leaving them both heartbroken. After Lucifer's departure, Chloe is promoted to Lieutenant and continues to solve murders with Ella and Carol Corbett while raising Rory as a single mother. Decades later, after returning to her own time, Rory makes peace with the elderly Chloe, who is on her deathbed. Chloe reassures her daughter that it was all worth it and that she would not change a thing before she dies.

After her death, Chloe meets Amenadiel in Heaven, who takes her to Hell where she is reunited with Lucifer, much to his shock and delight, offering to be Lucifer's partner for eternity.

=== Daniel "Dan" Espinoza ===
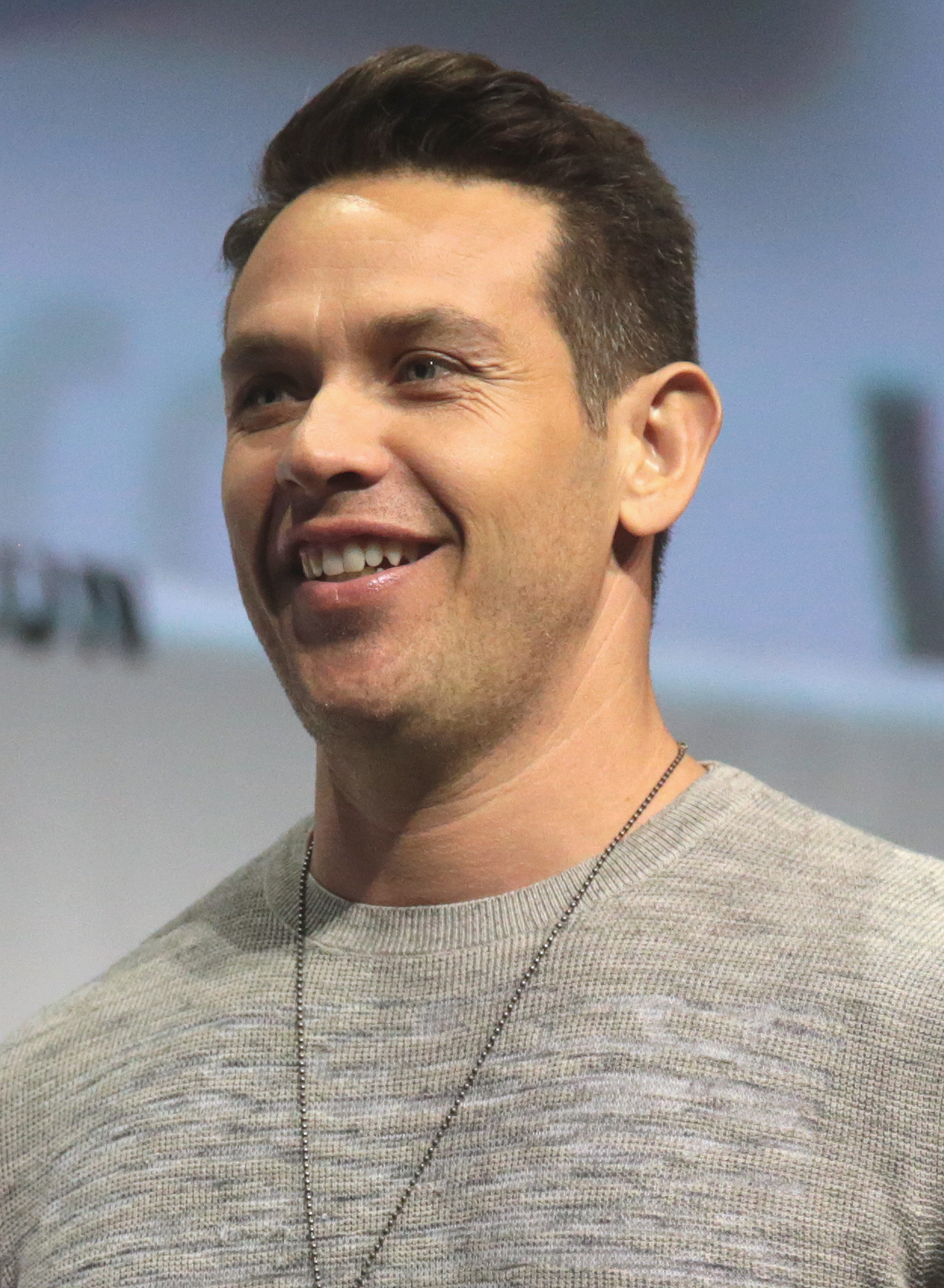
Kevin Alejandro

Detective Daniel "Dan" Espinoza is portrayed by Kevin Alejandro. He replaced Nicholas Gonzalez, who portrayed the character in the pilot.

An LAPD homicide detective and Chloe's ex-husband, he dislikes Lucifer's friendship with Chloe and Trixie, but as time passes Dan and Lucifer occasionally find common ground. Lucifer repeatedly calls him "Detective Douche". Originally Chloe's superior on the force, Dan was suspended due to the events of the Malcolm Graham case (season 1), then reinstated with a demotion to detective.

In season 2, he starts a complicated affair/relationship with Charlotte Richards, unaware that she's been possessed by Lucifer's mother. After Lucifer sends her to another universe and the real Charlotte revives, Dan is hurt because she doesn't remember him, but they eventually began dating. They sleep together in the episode "Quintessential Deckerstar", but Charlotte is killed that night protecting a weakened Amenadiel from Pierce. In the finale, he finds Charlotte's files on Pierce that help them discover he's the assassin. During season 4 Dan blames Lucifer for Charlotte's death as he knew Pierce was the Sinnerman before anyone else, and even tries to have Lucifer killed, only to inadvertently endanger Trixie's life in the process.

In season 5, Dan is manipulated by Michael into discovering the truth about Lucifer, and by extension Maze and Amenadiel, and he struggles to cope with realizing celestial beings, Heaven and Hell are real, becoming terrified that he and his family will end up in Hell. He is later murdered by mercenary Vincent Le Mec on Michael's orders, and due to his guilt over his various illicit activities - shooting Malcolm and covering it up, stealing a gun for Malcolm, having the man who murdered Chloe's father killed, and putting Lucifer and Trixie in danger - he is sent to Hell.

In the sixth season, it is revealed that Lucifer has managed to keep Dan out of his Hell loop and ordered the demons not to torture him. Lucifer often visits Dan, trying to help him to reach Heaven, but without success despite Dan apparently getting past all of his guilt with Lucifer's help. Trapped in Hell for what is thousands of years to him, Dan orders Lucifer to leave him alone until he comes up with a solution. Dan later makes a deal with the angel Rory to help her take down Lucifer in exchange for being set free from Hell, although this is actually a ruse on his part in order to warn Lucifer of the danger. Dan's return to Earth, however, brings him back in the form of a ghost rather than a resurrection and he is only able to be seen by his angelic and demonic friends. Dan spends his time on Earth attempting to work through his guilt and ascend into Heaven, but even with Maze's help, Dan has little success. He eventually comes to the conclusion that Vincent Le Mec - who has been imprisoned for Dan's murder - is the key to figuring his guilt out and visits Vincent in prison only to witness him escape. While trying to stop Vincent from committing another murder, Dan inadvertently possesses Vincent's body and neither he nor Lucifer can figure out how to get him out. Lucifer suggests that Dan make the most of the time that he has and spend it with the person that matters most to him. Posing as a friend of himself and Maze, Dan visits Trixie, whom he has been avoiding since his return, at summer camp and expresses his regret that he died before he could be the father that Trixie deserved. Trixie reveals her love, admiration and pride in her father, allowing Dan to finally let go of his guilt and ascend into Heaven, becoming the second ever Hell-condemned soul to do so.

In the series finale, Lucifer realizes that his true purpose is to help the lost souls in Hell overcome their guilt and achieve peace, inspired by how he had helped Dan, Lee Garner and Rory to do the same. It's revealed that Dan's soul was reunited with Charlotte Richards in Heaven and as a result, they are able to enjoy eternity together.

=== Amenadiel ===
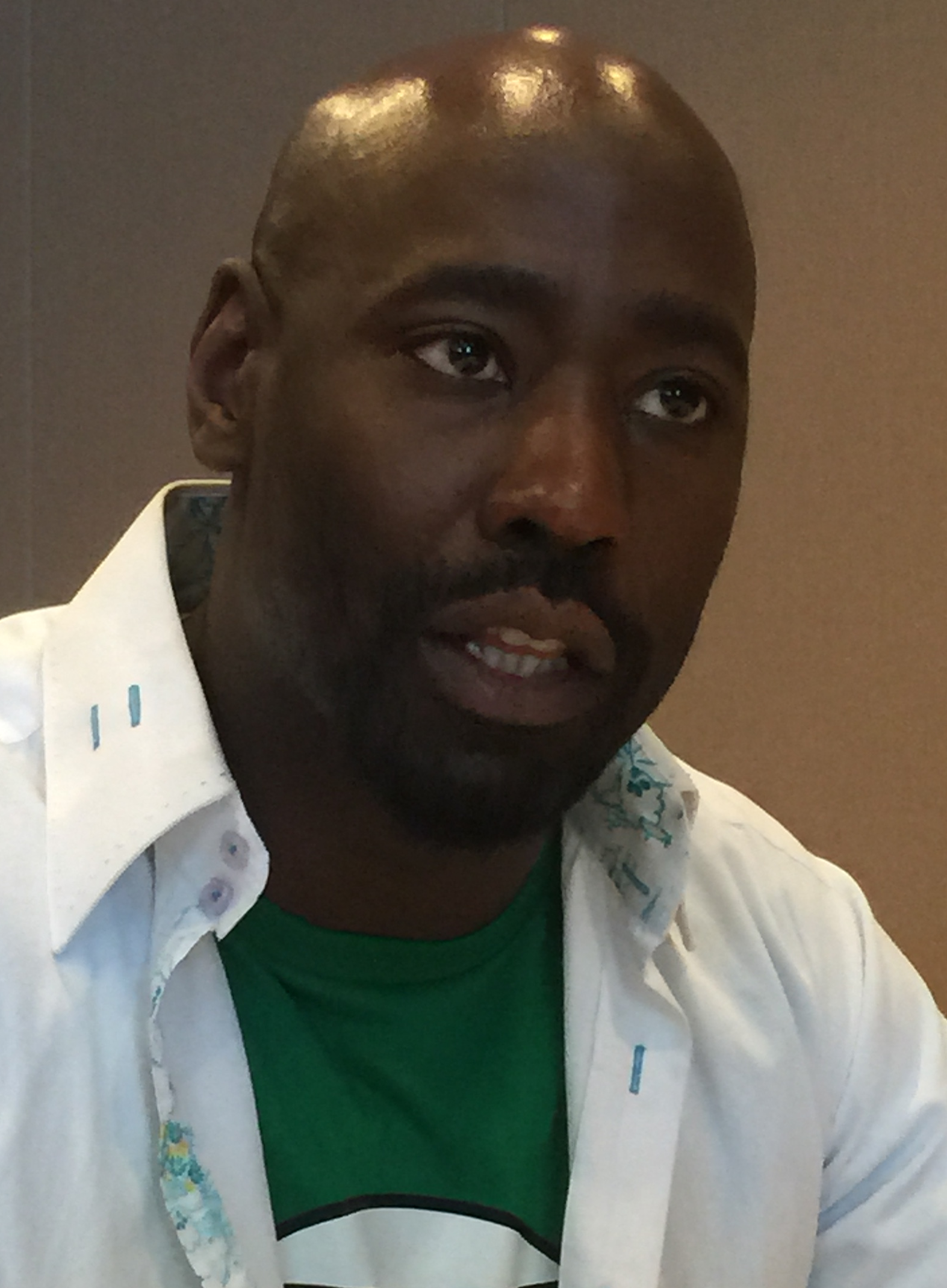
D. B. Woodside

Amenadiel, portrayed by D. B. Woodside, is an angel, Lucifer's older brother, and the eldest of all their siblings. His physical powers are similar to Lucifer's, and he can also slow down time. He arrives in Los Angeles to encourage Lucifer to go back to Hell, and failing that, he attempts to force Lucifer back in different ways. He grows closer to Lucifer through the seasons, through various circumstances. Like his brother, Lucifer, Amenadiel has more than one name; Amenadiel's angelic name literally means "Truly God-given", and one of his descriptive names/titles is "Firstborn" (as was revealed to be one of them in season 2). "Dr. Canaan" is an alias used by Amenadiel when posing as a new colleague of Dr. Linda Martin, referencing the ancient civilization of the same name.

Unlike Lucifer, Amenadiel has always followed God's orders, but comes to question his life choices as events on Earth make him lose power and his wings in season 2, sending him into a personal crisis where he tries to find himself. Amenadiel learns the necklace given to him by his father was the key to the Flaming Sword, which was entrusted to his cherished son, indicating that he himself is God's favorite angel and not Lucifer as he had always believed. At the end of the third season, Amenadiel regains his wings after witnessing Charlotte's death and takes her soul to heaven.

In season 4, it is revealed that Amenadiel's relationship with Linda Martin resulted in her becoming pregnant with their Nephilim son. Amenadiel struggles to protect his child, whom they name Charlie in honor of Charlotte, and fights with whether or not to take Charlie and raise him in Heaven. In the season finale, Charlie is kidnapped by demons who want to raise him to replace Lucifer as the King of Hell. After rescuing him with help from Lucifer, Chloe, Maze and Eve, Amenadiel finally decides to raise him on Earth with Linda.

In season 5, Amenadiel struggles with being a father and the manipulations of his younger brother Michael. When God finally returns and announces his retirement, Amenadiel is his first choice to replace him as God, but Amenadiel decides that he doesn't want the job and supports Lucifer instead. He also works towards becoming a cop, particularly after Dan is murdered.

In season 6, Amenadiel joins the LAPD, but is somewhat frustrated by Lucifer's refusal to take on the role of God after everything that they've sacrificed to get him the job, particularly when the leaderless angels begin to cause chaos and potentially the end of the world with their misguided attempts to help humans under their own initiative. He also tries to help Dan's ghost find peace and reach Heaven. After Lucifer decides that he doesn't want to be God, Chloe suggests that Amenadiel take the job and change how things are run. With Lucifer's blessing, Amenadiel becomes the new God, ruling from Earth where he is able to take care of his family at the same time and including their siblings more in the decision making. When Chloe eventually dies of old age, Amenadiel personally escorts her soul to Hell where Chloe willingly chooses to reside in order to help Lucifer with his work on redeeming Hell's lost souls.

According to The Lesser Key of Solomon (Ars Theurgia Goetia), Amenadiel is identified as an angel of the Cardinal direction of West.

=== Mazikeen "Maze" Smith ===
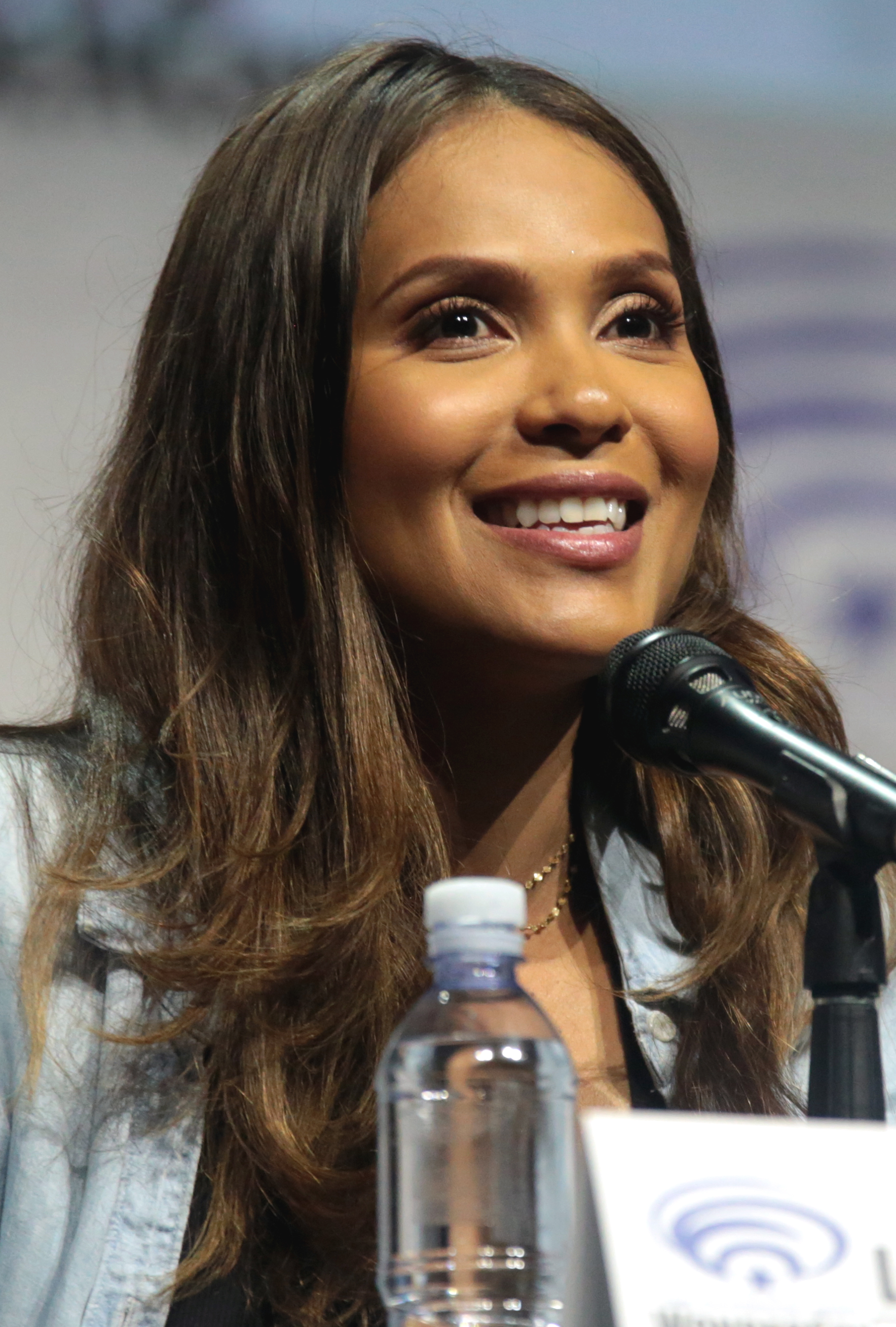
Lesley-Ann Brandt

Mazikeen of the Lilim, "Maze" for short, is portrayed by Lesley-Ann Brandt. She is a demon, as well as a confidante and devoted ally of Lucifer Morningstar. She served as his head torturer, followed him from Hell to Los Angeles with the assistance of John Constantine, and acted as a bartender and bodyguard at Lucifer's club. In season 2, Maze looks for a new direction on Earth and becomes a bounty hunter using the name Mazikeen Smith, having found something that feels right to her. Over the course of the series, a number of comparisons between Mazikeen and Lucifer can be made; each have multiple siblings (many of whom they do not get along with); both are bisexual, with high sex drives; both have parental-abandonment issues; both are multilingual, etc.

Like Lucifer, Mazikeen got her 'legal papers' and took on the surname "Smith" as an alias; when Maze and Eve got married in season 6, whether Eve had gotten one of her own and Mazikeen took it on, or if Eve simply took Mazikeen's 'legal' surname of "Smith", instead, is never mentioned.

Maze also becomes Chloe's roommate and befriends Chloe's daughter Trixie, but the friendship was strained in season 3 when, during a quarrel with Dan, Maze blurted out she was tired of his "stupid little brat", unaware that a heartbroken Trixie overheard her. Feeling bad about it, Maze apologizes in season 4's premiere and Trixie forgives her.

In season 3, she turns against Lucifer when he refuses to send her back to Hell, but ultimately returns to his side.

In season 4, due to Chloe's reaction to learning the truth about Lucifer, Maze moves out her house and in with Linda, decided to be the best aunt for Linda and Amenadiel's child. Mazikeen is also revealed to be the daughter of Lilith, Adam's ex-wife.

In season 5, Maze turns against Lucifer once more after she learns that he kept her mother's fate a secret from her. After her mother's death, Maze also became obsessed with obtaining a soul, hoping that it could enable her to find a soulmate, to the point of siding with Michael against Lucifer in hopes of gaining one. After the arrival of God, Maze seeks a soul from him, but he implies that she can "grow" a soul on her own and perhaps that she already has. She makes amends with Lucifer, siding with him in the battle against Michael to decide who the new God will be. When Dan is murdered by Vincent Le Mec, Maze is devastated and helps Lucifer to seek revenge for their friend's murder.

In season 6, Maze pursues a romantic relationship with Eve and eventually marries her. She also works with Dan's ghost, attempting to help him discover the source of his guilt and finally reach Heaven. Having learned that he will soon disappear and never return to the Earth, Lucifer says an emotional goodbye to Maze, calling her his best friend and stating that with the number of times that Maze has saved him, he owes her far more than he can ever repay. In turn, Maze is content with her life on Earth finally and provides Lucifer with one of her demon daggers as a parting gift.

In the series finale, Maze is revealed to have continued her work as a bounty hunter with Eve as her partner and she remains close with Chloe and her family even after Lucifer's departure.

=== Beatrice "Trixie" Espinoza ===
Trixie is portrayed by Scarlett Estevez.

Trixie is Chloe and Dan's seven-year-old (at the start of the series) daughter, who befriends Lucifer and Mazikeen. Trixie takes advice from both Maze and Lucifer, while also balancing what her parents try teaching her. She has a particular fondness for chocolate and can easily be bribed with it.

=== Dr. Linda Martin ===
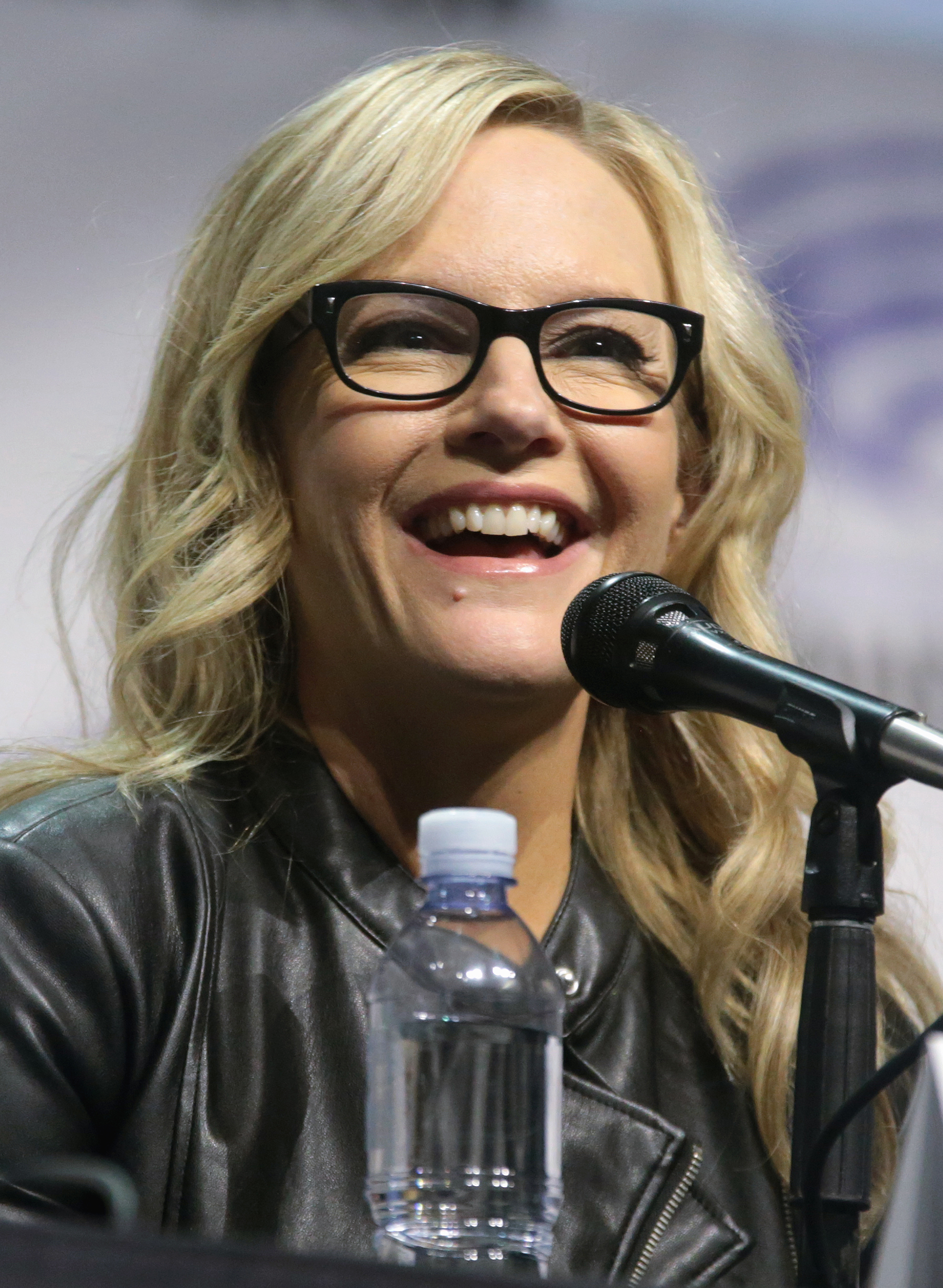
Rachael Harris

Dr. Linda Martin is portrayed by Rachael Harris.

Linda is Lucifer's Stanford-educated psychotherapist, who initially accepts "payments" from him in the form of sex. Like almost everyone else, Dr. Martin does not take what Lucifer says at face value, and at first believes that Lucifer is using a religious metaphor to describe himself and his dysfunctional family relationships, until he reveals his true self in season 2, which leaves her visibly shaken. Prior to this, her attempts to help Lucifer solve his emotional and personal problems have limited success, since she does not accept what he tells her as the truth, and because Lucifer himself has a tendency to misunderstand or misapply her advice. Eventually, Dr. Martin becomes part of Lucifer's circle of friends as well as his therapist.

In season 3, her friendship with Amenadiel turns into a love affair, which angers his previous lover Mazikeen, who has become Linda's friend. Their friendship is ruptured, but when Cain, while holding Maze prisoner, threatens to hurt Linda, Maze fights her way free and rushes to Linda despite her injuries, only collapsing when she sees that Linda is all right.

In season 4, she finds out she's pregnant with Amenadiel's half-angel child. Linda and Amenadiel name their son Charlie in honor of Charlotte.

=== Malcolm Graham ===
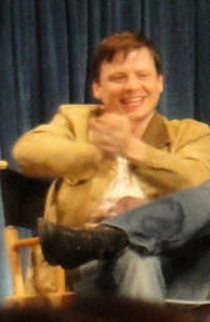
Kevin Rankin

Detective Malcolm Graham is portrayed by Kevin Rankin.

Malcolm is a police officer who was shot prior to the beginning of the series. Chloe Decker witnessed the shooting, which occurred while Malcolm was secretly meeting with a suspected criminal. After the shooting, Malcolm was left in a coma. He briefly died but was then brought back from hell by Amenadiel to kill Lucifer, but Lucifer persuaded Malcolm to not kill him, after revealing that Amenadiel would be unable to kill Malcolm. Malcolm later kills Lucifer at the end of season one, though Lucifer is brought back to life by God. Chloe shortly after kills Malcolm.

=== "Mum" / Goddess ===
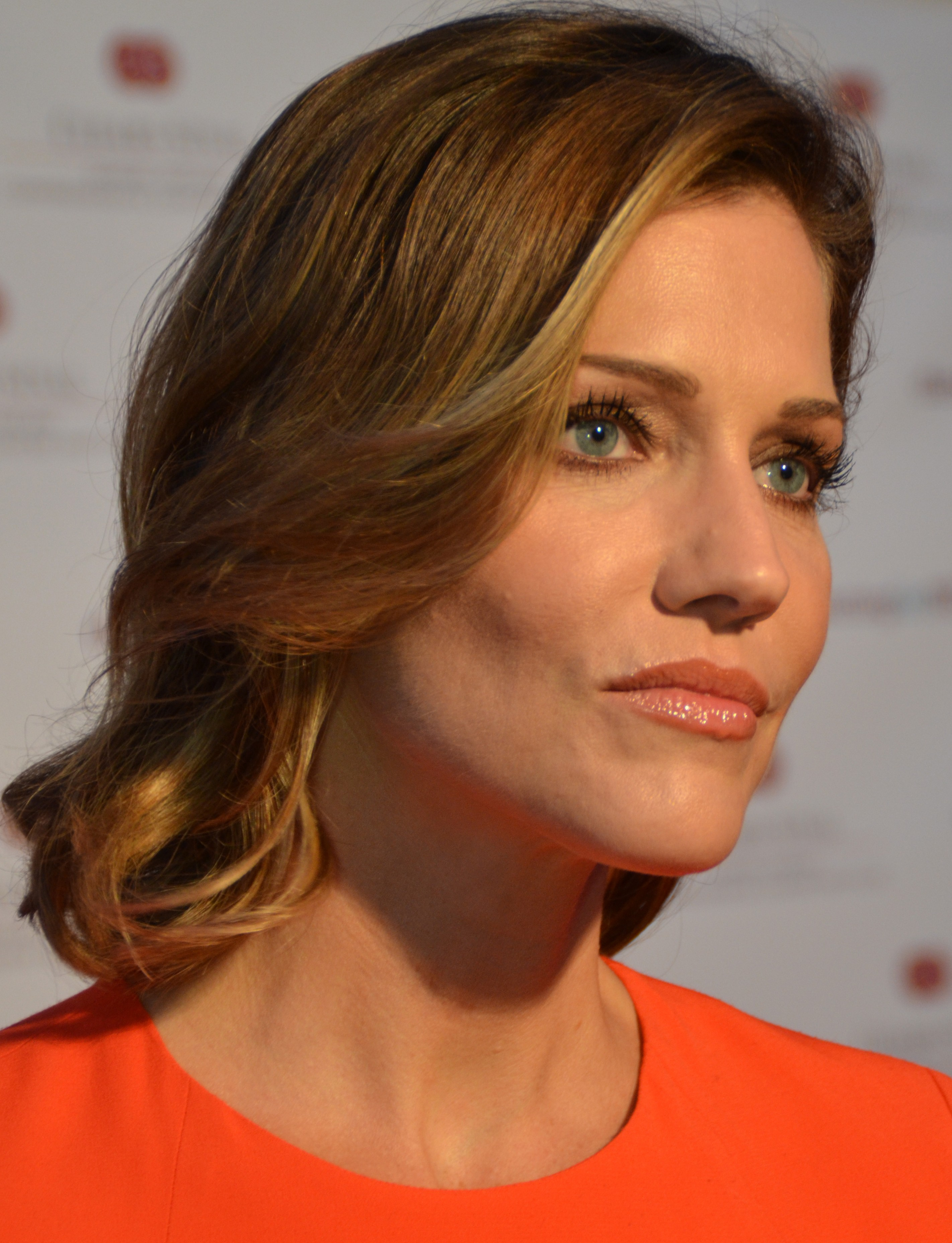
Tricia Helfer

Lucifer and Amenadiel's mother and exiled wife of God, who has escaped her prison in Hell. She is described as "the goddess of all creation", but her name and exact nature remain unrevealed. Lucifer simply calls her "Mum". She is rumored to have caused plagues and floods before her imprisonment, which she doesn't deny, and seeks revenge on her ex-husband. On Earth, her soul occupies the dead body of Charlotte Richards (portrayed by Tricia Helfer), a murdered lawyer, and she struggles with a human world she doesn't like or understand, as well as the ups and downs of living as a human. She starts a complicated relationship with Dan Espinoza.

At the end of season 2, she leaves the universe, prompted by Lucifer to create her own world.

In season 5, Goddess returns after Lucifer has Gabriel send a message to her about God's impending retirement. God and Goddess are happily reunited and decide to retire to her universe together although they won't have the power to ever return.

=== Charlotte Richards ===
Portrayed by Tricia Helfer, murdered hellbound lawyer Charlotte Richards is resurrected by the act of "Mum" having abandoned her human body, which in turn allows her to remember her time in Hell. As a result, she doesn't understand why she's separated from her husband and why her children don't want to see her. Scared into trying to be a better person, Charlotte begins working for the DA's office in season 3. Charlotte thinks she's crazy as another result of going to Hell. Lucifer and Amenadiel eventually tell Charlotte about Mum taking over her body, and reveals divinity to her. At the end of the season, she dies after jumping in front of a bullet meant for Amenadiel, who takes her soul to heaven.

In the series finale, it is shown that Dan's soul is reunited with Charlotte in Heaven after he finally lets go of his guilt. The two engage in a romantic relationship in the afterlife.

=== Ella Lopez ===
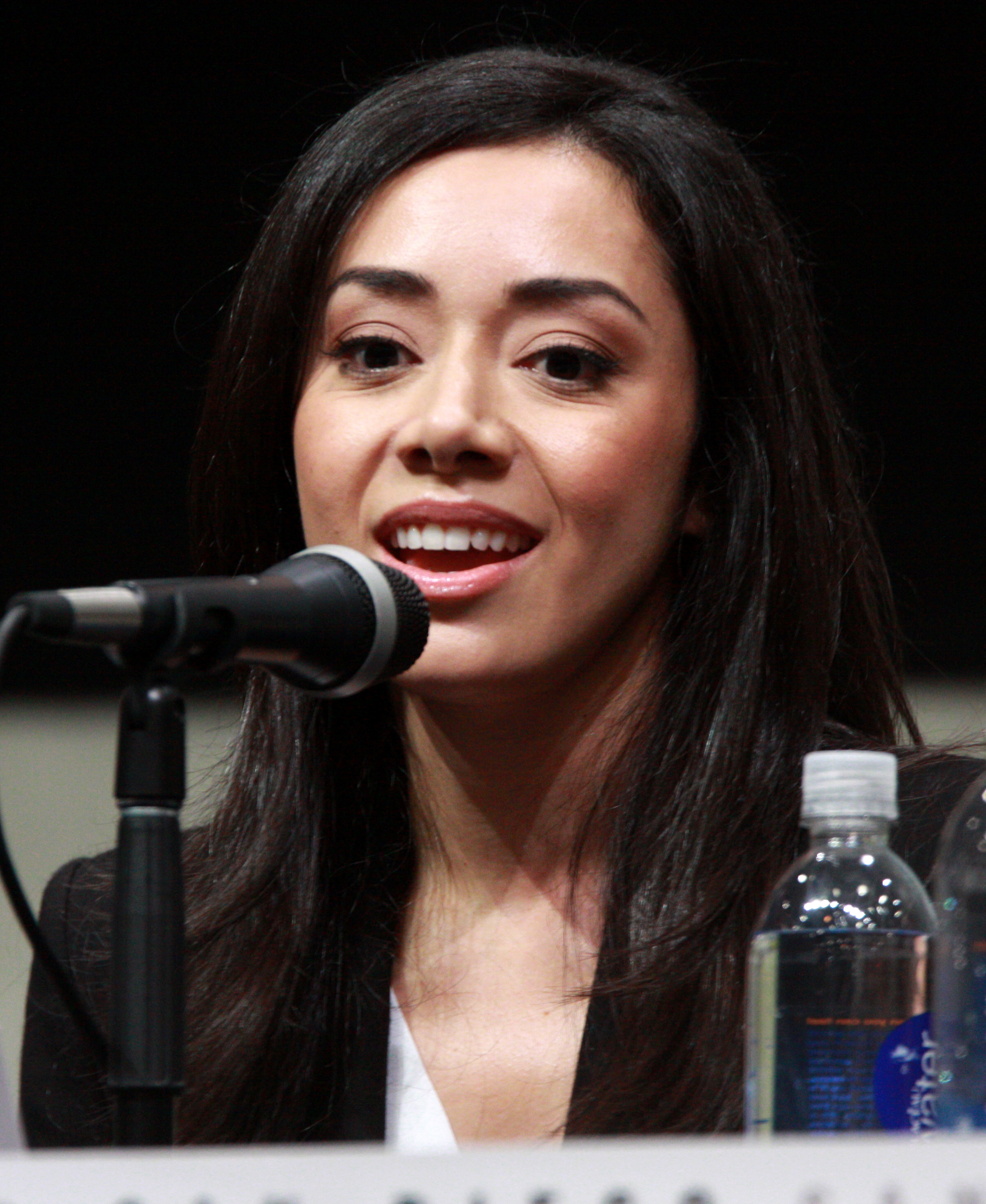
Aimee Garcia

Ella Lopez is portrayed by Aimee Garcia since season 2.

Ella is a forensic scientist for the LAPD who helps Chloe and Lucifer with their cases, usually being the one conducting examinations on crime scenes and analyzing them afterward. She hails from Detroit, has four brothers, and claims to have a somewhat criminal past, having stolen cars in her teenage years with her brother. This is reflected in the season 3 bonus episode "Once Upon a Time", set in an alternate universe, where she is a criminal carjacker and mechanic. She also knows how to defuse bombs, which she successfully did to save everyone's lives in the season 4 episode "Expire Erect". She is known for being unceasingly perky and talkative, which has led Pierce as her superior to snap at her in public on one occasion, leaving her devastated. After a pep talk from Charlotte Richards, she learns to stand up for herself and berates Pierce, who apologizes to her. Nevertheless, Chloe and the rest of their colleagues wholeheartedly accept Ella for who she is.

Ella has a devout Catholic faith and wears a crucifix, leading both Lucifer and Chloe to ask questions about her faith. She has a nun aunt, who taught her that to doubt things is important, and so Ella believes that questioning things, looking at things from different angles, makes her a better scientist. After Charlotte's murder, Ella's faith is severely shaken and for a time she stops believing in God completely, concluding that humans can rely only on themselves and are responsible for good and evil. However, feeling that she has had a void in her life, by the end of season 4, she regains her faith completely.

Two of her brothers have already been seen on the show. On the season 2 episode "A Good Day to Die", Ella goes to her brother Ricardo for a rare chemical that they need, and berates him for ghosting her due to his illegal dealings. In the season 3 episode "My Brother's Keeper", Ella's older brother Jay, a diamond authenticator, gets up mixed in a murder involving stolen diamonds, but he is ultimately innocent.

In season 4, Ella begins a relationship with Dan, and convinces him to let go of his anger and hatred after Charlotte's death, at the same time she regains her faith.

The season 3 bonus episode "Boo Normal" reveals that Ella was in a near-fatal car accident at the age of eight, leading Azrael, the Angel of Death and one of Lucifer's sisters, to appear to Ella as a ghost named Rae-Rae and befriend her; Lucifer makes the connection after Ella uses a catchphrase Azrael often uses. She was behind Ella moving to Los Angeles, intentionally putting her in Lucifer's circle, knowing that he'd look out for Ella better than her Lopez family relations, who, according to Azrael, don't treat Ella very well, even though Ella insists that they are always there for each other as family.

In season 6, Ella notices a pattern suggesting that the Apocalypse is coming and finally discovers the truth about her friends which leaves Ella almost heartbroken that they didn't trust her enough to reveal the truth themselves. Ella's warning helps Lucifer and Amenadiel prevent the upcoming disaster and Lucifer opens a STEM initiative in Ella's name, recognizing the need for more people like her in the world. Ella starts a romantic relationship with Carol Corbett and continues solving murders with Chloe and Carol after Lucifer departs.

=== Cain / Marcus Pierce ===
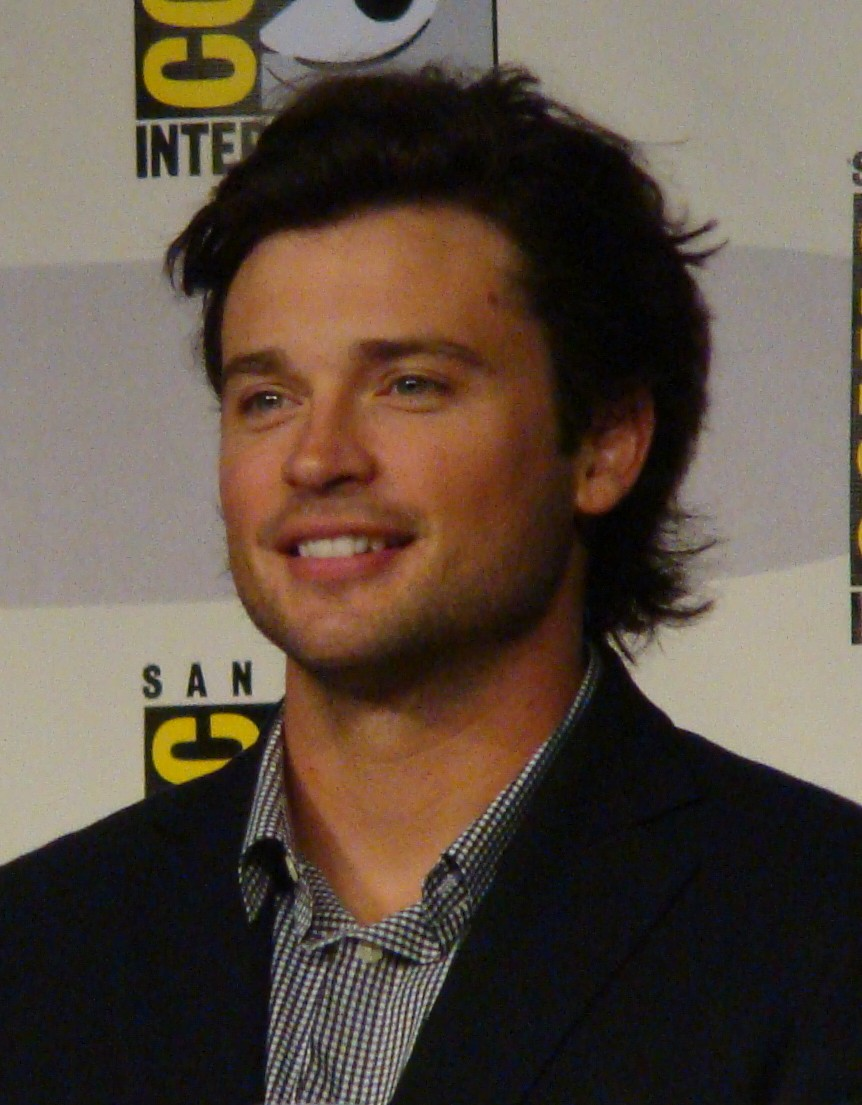
Tom Welling

Marcus Pierce, portrayed by Tom Welling, is a highly respected police lieutenant who becomes the new head of the precinct in season 3, overseeing the work of Chloe, Dan, and Ella at the precinct. He is revealed to be not just leading a double life as the highly feared crime lord "the Sinnerman", but also being the immortal Cain, the world's first murderer, condemned to wander the Earth forever. Cain briefly allies with Lucifer in an attempt to make himself mortal, but they fall out as they compete over Chloe's affections, and Lucifer's concerns for Chloe's safety. He asks Chloe to marry him just seconds before Lucifer was going to confess his feelings to her, but she breaks the engagement soon after. Pierce kills Charlotte in the 23rd episode of season 3, and is finally killed by Lucifer in the next (season finale) episode after an attempt to ambush him and kill Chloe.

=== Eve ===
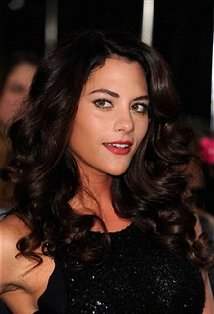
Inbar Lavi

Eve, portrayed by Inbar Lavi, is the world's first female human, Cain's mother and former lover of Lucifer who appears in season 4. She kills Father Kinley in self-defence, who is then possessed by a demon, named Dromos (one of Maze's many siblings), in an attempt to get Lucifer to come to Hell to rule again as king so she can be with him again. She later repents and helps them rescue Charlie, having had an epiphany that, all along, it wasn't Lucifer she was trying to cling to but her uninhibited self back when she was with him. Into the second part of season 5, Eve returns (having also become a bounty hunter), looking to reconnect with Maze, having realized that she was genuinely happy with her, after which they start working together. In the sixth season, she marries Maze (whether Eve takes Mazikeen's 'legal' surname of "Smith", or if Eve had gotten one of her own and Mazikeen took it on as her own, instead, is never mentioned).

=== Michael ===
Michael is Lucifer's twin brother who is also portrayed by Tom Ellis. He makes his first appearance in season 5, taking over his brother's identity after Lucifer returns to Hell. He is a dark-winged angel. Michael's angelic, 'God-given' name literally means "Who is like God" and one of his known descriptive names/titles, "Demiurgos" literally means "Creator". Michael is a mirror image of Lucifer; he's left-handed instead of right, prefers clear liquor to brown, has black wings instead of white, and taps into fears rather than desires. After Michael kills Chloe, Lucifer sacrifices himself to resurrect her and Chloe is able to use part of the Flaming Sword to beat Michael into submission. Lucifer suddenly returns, stops Chloe from killing Michael and instead cuts off his brother's wings so that he can have a second chance. In the sixth season, it is revealed that Lucifer subsequently imprisoned Michael in Hell for his crimes; not in a cell, but as a janitor.

=== Lilith / Lily Rose ===
Lilith is Mazikeen's mother who is also portrayed by Lesley-Ann Brandt (and by L. Scott Caldwell in an elderly capacity). She makes her first appearance at the end of episode 4, in season 5, having grown elderly (after having relinquished her immortality in an attempt to find purpose). Later, at the end of episode 5, it is revealed that she'd just died, shortly after Maze's first visit (coinciding with Amenadiel's return from Hell, having been relieved of his duties there, filling-in for Lucifer), and descending into Hell, after which point God declares to Amenadiel that Hell "no-longer needs a warden", but leaving Maze with unresolved issues. Lilith can tame the "beasts of the night" and force them into submission (something that Adam found attractive about her), which was partly what led to her banishment from the Garden of Eden, prior-to-and-necessitating the creation of Eve (the other reason was her refusal to submit to Adam as his wife). Before leaving, Lilith took a lone white stone from Eden to serve as a reminder that, as much as she loved her home in Eden, she doesn't need Adam or God; the stone turned black when Lilith gave up her immortality and put it into her ring which she then gave to Lucifer as a parting gift. According to Maze, Lilith was already 12,000-years-old when she gave birth to her and the rest of the Lilim (including Dromos and Squee), who number in the thousands. The father of her children (Mazikeen-&-co.'s father) has yet-to-be brought-up (in the comic books, he is revealed to be a serpent demon, named Ophur).

=== "Dad" / God ===
Portrayed by Dennis Haysbert, he is the creator of the world and father of all angels, including Lucifer and Amenadiel. Previously appearing as a narrating voice portrayed by Neil Gaiman, he appears fully to stop the fight between Lucifer, Amenadiel and Michael in season 5's mid-season ending. God becomes convinced that he is losing it and decides to retire and make either Michael or Lucifer his successor. Amenadiel eventually discovers that Michael has only been manipulating God to believe this, but Lucifer is able to contact Goddess who is happily reunited with her husband. The two decide to retire together in Goddess' universe and before leaving, God finally admits that he loves Lucifer and is proud of who he has become.

=== Aurora "Rory" Decker-Morningstar ===
Portrayed by Brianna Hildebrand. Initially presented as the antagonist of the final season, Rory is revealed to be the half-angel daughter of Lucifer and Chloe, who came back from the future after inadvertently triggering a 'self-actualization' event at her mother's deathbed. After finding herself in the past, her first action is to get revenge on Lucifer, having seemingly been abandoned by her father before she was born. A young, rebellious half-angel with scarlet-coloured wings with bladed feathers, she is similar to her dad despite her initial hatred of him. She's very close to her mother, who raised her with the help of her and Lucifer's friends and family. It is revealed that, in the future, Rory inherited and drives Lucifer's black corvette. She returns to her own time after her father helps her overcome the guilt and the rage, having realized that she was the one who asked him to leave (in order to help the lost souls in hell). While saying goodbye to her mother on her deathbed, Rory tells her she'll see her parents in the afterlife again soon, as angels can travel through dimensions as they please.

== Other characters ==
=== Celestials ===
==== Uriel ====
Portrayed by Michael Imperioli, Uriel's angelic name literally means "God is my Light". Uriel came down to Earth to kill his mother with Azrael's blade in the season 2 episode "Weaponizer". He threatened Lucifer that he would kill Chloe if he didn't turn their mother over to him, finally forcing Lucifer to kill him. His special ability was to foresee and manipulate patterns of behavior and probability.

Later, when Lucifer goes to Hell to find a cure for Chloe's poisoning, it is revealed that the murder of Uriel is Lucifer's own hell loop.

==== Azrael ====
Portrayed by Lo Mutuc (Note: credited as Charlyne Yi), she is one of Lucifer and Amenadiel's many younger sisters, and the Angel of Death; her angelic name literally means "Help from God". She is mentioned in season 2, but doesn't appear until season 3 episode "Boo Normal", when it is revealed she befriended eight-years-old Ella after a car accident, and occasionally met with her under the guise of being a ghost. She pushed Ella to move to Los Angeles, so she could meet Lucifer. She wanted her favourite human and favorite brother to be able to turn to each other because she couldn't be there for them. Since the move, Ella had not encountered Azrael for five years. She later returns just before Michael kills Chloe and bows to Lucifer as the new deity.

==== Remiel ====
Remiel, a Gregori, is portrayed by Vinessa Vidotto starting in season 4, and mentioned in passing, in season 5, episode 2, by Michael. Her angelic name translates, literally, as "Thunder of God". Remiel is another of Lucifer's and Amenadiel's many younger sisters, though she is closer to Amenadiel (he calls her "Remmy", as does Michael), and looks down upon Lucifer ("Our brother, Lucifer, is -what do they call it here?- a slut"), though, according to Michael, her opinion of Lucifer has risen when news to Heaven that Lucifer had returned to Hell of his own Free Will ("What a Sacrifice"). When Amenadiel first meets her down on Earth, he asks her if "...the Silver City run out of stags to hunt? You need a break from Castiel's singing? Or do you just miss your big bro?" which alludes that Remiel shares similar characteristics with Artemis/Diana from Classical Greco-Roman mythology, as an avid hunter.

She comes to Earth after having sensed a new celestial being about to be born. She initially assumes Lucifer to be the father of the child ("There was bound to be a child eventually, 'cause of all of the meaningless sexual encounters"), and wants to take the child to be raised in The Silver City, proposing to simply just 'cut' the baby out of its mother, Linda, without any consideration for her. After having tried to distract her from her goal by leading her on a wild goose chase (staking out Lux, etc.), Amenadiel accidentally lets slip that he is the one who fathered the as-yet unborn celestial, and has to face Remiel in single combat. After Amenadiel fairly defeats Remiel, she relents on taking the child, but continues to insist that it will be a bad idea to keep the child in the Human world.

In season 5, she returns to warn Lucifer that Michael is gathering support in Heaven to become the new God and offers to spy for Lucifer as she hates Michael more than she hates Lucifer. She is later killed by Michael with Azrael's Blade after discovering the location of the third piece of the Flaming Sword.

==== Zadkiel ====
Portrayed by Joel Rush. Seen in Season 5, the Angel of Righteousness, Zadkiel's angelic name literally means "God is my Righteousness/Kindness". One of Lucifer and Amenadiel's many younger brothers, he is the only angel to side with Lucifer during the final battle between Michael (Lucifer's twin) and Lucifer.

==== Raziel ====
Portrayed by Kellina Rutherford. The angel of mysteries, Raziel's angelic name literally means "secret of God". One of Lucifer and Amenadiel's many younger sisters, she appeared in season 5, episode 16. She helped Michael to get the last piece of the Flaming Sword. During the angel vote in the Los Angeles Memorial Coliseum, she first chooses for Lucifer, but doesn't dare to fight Michael with the Flaming Sword. When all angels kneel for Lucifer, she stand behind Amenadiel and Zadkiel.

==== Gabriel ====
Portrayed by Kimia Behpoornia, Gabriel is one of Lucifer and Amenadiel's many younger sisters, the angel of messages, known for her compulsive gossiping. Gabriel's name literally means "My Strength is God".

==== Jophiel ====
Portrayed by Miles Burris. Seen in Season 5, Jophiel is one of Lucifer and Amenadiel's many younger brothers. Jophiel's angelic name literally means "God is my Rock".

==== Saraqael ====
Portrayed by Ginifer King, Saraqael's angelic name literally means "God is Princely". One of Lucifer and Amenadiel's many younger sisters, she is known for an interest in the culinary arts.

=== Mortals ===
==== Penelope Decker ====
Portrayed by Rebecca De Mornay, she is Chloe's widowed mother and an actress.

==== Candy Fletcher (Morningstar) ====
Portrayed by Lindsey Gort. While Lucifer was away in Las Vegas, he met Candy and helped her. In exchange, she agreed to play the role of his wife, to trick his mother and oldest brother, Amenadiel, and also to push Chloe away "for her own good".

==== Father Kinley / Dromos ====
Portrayed by Graham McTavish in Season 4, Father Kinley encounters Chloe after she discovers Lucifer is truly the devil and works with her to bring Lucifer back to Hell. He believes the prophecy that when the Devil walks the Earth and finds his first love, evil shall be released.

Kinley is killed by Eve and subsequently possessed by the demon Dromos who wants to bring Lucifer back to hell. When Lucifer turns down his request, he kidnaps Linda and Amenadiel's son Charlie to raise him to replace Lucifer on hell's throne, since only an angel can rule there.

==== Lee "Mr. Said Out Bitch" Garner ====
Portrayed by Jeremiah Birkett, Lee is a thief who has been foiled by Lucifer on several occasions. In season five, it is revealed that Lee was murdered and went to Hell. Lucifer, back in Hell, visits him in his Hell loop and decides to solve who murdered him when he found out the crime happened in Los Angeles. Lucifer fails to break Lee's loop and eventually departs Hell to return to Earth. In the season finale, Lucifer returns to Heaven to resurrect Chloe and is greeted by Lee who explains that after Lucifer's departure, he finally faced his guilt and became the first human soul to escape from Hell on its own. Lee helps the weakened Lucifer reach Chloe as thanks.

==== Anders Brodie ====
Portrayed by Stephen Schneider, Anders Brodie is Elon Musk-like entrepreneur.

==== Vincent Le Mec ====
Portrayed by Rob Benedict, Vincent Le Mec is a French mercenary who appears in seasons 5 and 6.

In season 5, Vincent and his men are hired by the archangel Michael to recover Amenadiel's necklace, the third piece of the Flaming Sword. Vincent kidnaps Detective Dan Espinoza and, on the orders of Michael, murders Dan as he attempts to escape. An enraged Lucifer and Maze subsequently hunt down Vincent and slaughter his men. Taking on his Devil face, Lucifer whispers something into Vincent's ear, causing him to collapse to his knees in terror as Lucifer and Maze walk away.

In season 6, it is revealed that Vincent was imprisoned for life for Dan's murder. Dan's ghost comes to the conclusion that Vincent is the key to resolving his guilt and getting into Heaven and he visits Vincent in prison just before the chaos caused by the angels allows Vincent to escape. Vincent robs a convenience store and prepares to possibly kill the clerk Josh and while trying to stop him, Dan accidentally possesses Vincent's body and he can't figure out how to get back out even with Lucifer's help. Taking advantage of having physical form again, Dan talks to his daughter Trixie and expresses his regret over not being the father that she deserves. After Trixie expresses her love and admiration for Dan and reassures him that he was a great father, Dan's soul rises into Heaven, leaving Vincent with control of his body back and full memories of everything that Dan did while possessing him.

In the series finale, Vincent kidnaps Lucifer's daughter Rory and weaponizes her angel feathers in order to get revenge on Lucifer. Vincent claims that Lucifer has trapped him in what is essentially a living Hell loop, forcing Vincent to constantly relive his guilt, driving him insane. Vincent ends up in a standoff with Lucifer, attempting to force him to undo his curse, but Lucifer is unable to help him, as there is no curse; it's all in his head, and Vincent is only being tortured by his-own guilt, in-light of the confirmation of the existence of Hell, and the fact that he is a murderer. Rory breaks free and nearly strangles Vincent to death before Lucifer talks her down in order to prevent his daughter from becoming the monster that he did. Vincent attempts to attack Lucifer while his back is turned, but Chloe shoots him and Vincent impales on two of Rory's weaponized feathers as he falls. With his last words, Vincent reveals that Dan got into Heaven and he expresses a desire to experience the same fate, but he only sees darkness as he dies. Decades later, Vincent is one of the souls in Lucifer's therapy sessions that he is trying to help overcome their guilt by confronting it and get into Heaven. Now sane again and with a calmer disposition, Vincent offers to shoot Reese Getty and put him out of his misery if he can't change, but Lucifer tells Vincent off for his threat, noting that they still have more work to do with him. The session is interrupted by the arrival of Chloe following her death from old age and her decision to willingly go to Hell to be with Lucifer for eternity.

==== Carol Corbett ====
Portrayed by Scott Porter, Carol Corbett is a detective and friend of Dan's who tried to set him up with Ella before he died at the end of season 5. In season 6 he works with Ella, taking the places of Dan and Chloe. They begin to date. He is a recovering alcoholic.
