= Born Killers =

2005 American crime drama film by Morgan J. Freeman

- DVD cover
- Directed by: Morgan J. Freeman
- Written by: Kendall Delcambre
- Produced by: Marcus Allen; Gustavo Spoliansky; Jai Stefan
- Starring: Jake Muxworthy; Lauren German; Kelli Garner; Tom Sizemore; Gabriel Mann
- Cinematography: Nancy Schreiber
- Edited by: Lawrence A. Maddox
- Music by: Jim Lang
- Production companies: Hudson River Entertainment; SHRINK Media Inc.
- Distributed by: Lionsgate Home Entertainment
- Release dates: October 22, 2005 (Hamptons); December 11, 2007 (United States)
- Running time: 87 minutes
- Country: United States
- Language: English

Born Killers (also known as Piggy Banks) is a 2005 American crime drama film directed by Morgan J. Freeman and starring Jake Muxworthy, Lauren German, Tom Sizemore, Kelli Garner, and Gabriel Mann. It was released on DVD on December 11, 2007, by Lionsgate Home Entertainment.

== Cast ==
- Jake Muxworthy as John
- Gabriel Mann as Michael
- Tom Sizemore as Dad
- Lauren German as Gertle
- Kelli Garner as Archer
- Dylan Sprouse as Young John
- Lin Shaye as Willow

== Production ==
Principal photography took place in Utah.

== Sexual misconduct allegations ==
During the making of the film in 2003, Tom Sizemore was told to leave the set after he allegedly touched the genitals of an anonymous child actress. Sizemore denied any wrongdoing, and was allowed back on the film set after the Salt Lake County prosecutor's office decided against going forward with the case "due to witness and evidence problems."

In May 2018, the unnamed actress, then aged 26, filed a lawsuit seeking at least $3 million from Sizemore, claiming his alleged abuse had caused long-standing emotional problems. A statement from Sizemore's publicist again denied the allegations, noting that nothing amiss was reported by a Born Killers staff member tasked with supervising child actors on set. After USA Today reported on August 27, 2020, that a Utah Judge had dismissed the lawsuit, Sizemore released a statement stating: "Beyond the loss of work and the pain and humiliation this has caused me and my family, the thought that an 11-year-old girl would think I violated her, whether it be because she misconstrued some inadvertent touching when the director placed her upon my lap for the photo shoot or someone else instilled this idea in her head for whatever malicious, self-serving reasons, is what devastates me most."
