= Standing Still (film) =

- Theatrical release poster
- Directed by: Matthew Cole Weiss
- Written by: Matthew Perniciaro; Timm Sharp
- Produced by: Trent Othick; Matthew Perniciaro; Jeff Rice
- Starring: Jon Abrahams; Amy Adams; Roger Avary
- Cinematography: Robert Brinkmann
- Edited by: Andy Blumenthal
- Music by: BC Smith
- Production company: Insomnia Entertainment
- Distributed by: Freestyle Releasing
- Release date: June 17, 2005 (US)
- Running time: 90 minutes
- Country: United States
- Language: English
- Budget: $1,700,000

Standing Still is a 2005 American romantic comedy film directed by Matthew Cole Weiss and starring an ensemble cast including Adam Garcia, Amy Adams, Aaron Stanford, Roger Avery, Melissa Sagemiller, Jon Abrahams, Mena Suvari, Colin Hanks and James Van Der Beek. Written by Matthew Perniciaro and Timm Sharp, the film is about a group of lifelong friends who reunite at a wedding and revisit their complicated relationships of the past. The film was Matthew Cole Weiss's feature film debut as a director.

== Plot ==
The day before the wedding of Elise and Michael in LA, their college friends gather to attend the bachelor and bachelorette parties and then the ceremony the next day.

Rich and Samantha are the best man and maid of honor, and themselves a couple, although Rich is wary of the idea of marriage, while Samantha is pushing him to consider it, while hiding her pregnancy from him. Sam Malone, nicknamed "Pockets" because he can always find the right item in his pockets (and to mask the fact that he's named similarly to the protagonist from Cheers), is flying in from Thailand, still harboring an unrequited love for neurotic Lana since their college days, when she broke his heart.

The group also includes Quentin, a spirited film agent, and Simon Black, a self-important movie star who shows up in the company of Franklin Brauner, director of his next project, described as "a metaphysical western, sort of El Topo meets The Matrix". Jennifer, who comes from London, was Elise's one-time girlfriend in college. She is still in love with her and tries to prevent her from marrying Michael. During the day, Michael's estranged father Jonathan also shows up, hoping for reconciliation, but is rebuffed.

That night, the men and women separate to go to their respective parties. The guys go to Vegas on Simon's private jet, while the girls stay at Elise and Michael's. Once they've reunited, Quentin stumbles onto Elise's sister Sarah, who came earlier as a surprise, and has sex with her not knowing she's just 17. Pockets confronts Lana about his hurt feelings, then has a fight with Simon, who's particularly condescending toward him, and ends up in jail after soliciting an undercover cop. Jennifer, who's been brusque with everyone, bonds with Lana, and they find themselves having sex, to Lana's surprise.

Michael explains to Rich that marriage is not the "next step to the grave" he thinks it is, then reveals to Elise the truth about his ex-alcoholic father, whom Michael blames for his mother's accidental death in a car crash, while a younger Michael was driving. Elise confesses she's the one who invited him to the wedding, not knowing about their troubled past.

The next morning, Michael goes to his father's motel, they reconcile and he invites him to the wedding. Lana agrees to try to be with Jennifer, exploring an entirely new avenue in her life, much to the chagrin of Donovan, a TV children's entertainer who invited himself as Lana's last minute date for the wedding. Quentin is shocked to find out Sarah's underaged, but they arrange to wait for her to be 18 before going public. And Rich proposes to Samantha, who finally reveals her pregnancy.

== Cast ==
In alphabetical order:

- Jon Abrahams as "Pockets", the out of town friend, in love with Lana
- Amy Adams as Elise, the bride
- Roger Avary as Franklin Brauner, Simon's next film's director
- Xander Berkeley as Jonathan, Michael's estranged father
- Ethan Embry as Donovan, weird TV personality, Lana's date
- Adam Garcia as Michael, the groom
- Lauren German as Jennifer, Elise's lesbian ex-girlfriend
- Colin Hanks as Quentin, the agent friend
- Melissa Sagemiller as Samantha, the maid of honor, Rich's fiancée
- Aaron Stanford as Rich, the best man, Samantha's fiancé
- Mena Suvari as Lana, Elise and Samantha's friend
- James Van Der Beek as Simon, a famous actor, Quentin's client, Lana's one-night stand
- Marnette Patterson as Sarah, Elise's younger sister

== Reception ==
On the review aggregator website Rotten Tomatoes, 40% of 20 critics' reviews are positive, with an average rating of 4.40/10. The website's consensus reads: "This coming-of-age film's young, attractive cast helps to mitigate the stultifying dialogue and uninspired direction."
