= Lauren German =

American actress (born 1978)

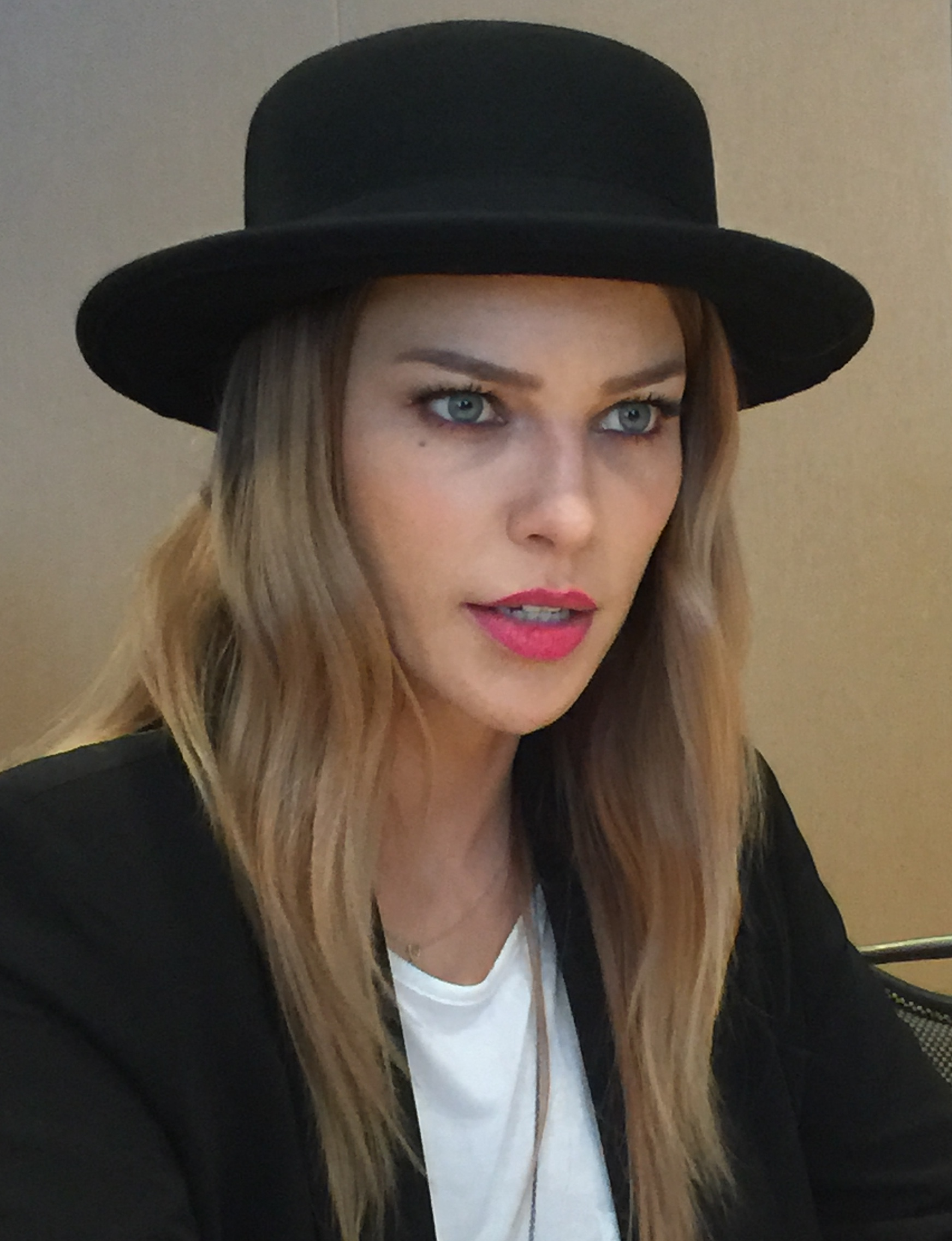
- German in July 2015
- Born: November 29, 1978 (age 47); Huntington Beach, California, U.S.
- Occupation: Actress
- Years active: 2000–present

Lauren German (born November 29, 1978) is an American actress. She may be best known for her role as Chloe Decker in the six-season run of Lucifer (2016–2021), having previously been in the main cast for two seasons of Chicago Fire (2012–2014). Film roles include appearances in A Walk to Remember (2002), Born Killers (2005) and The Divide (2011).

== Early life ==
Lauren German was born in Huntington Beach, California, on November 29, 1978, the daughter of Holly and vascular surgeon Richard German. Her father was born in the U.S. to an English mother and Dutch father. She attended Los Alamitos High School and trained as a dancer at the Orange County High School of the Arts, then enrolled at the University of Southern California to study anthropology before moving to New York City to study at the Actors Studio.

== Career ==
German's first work was on stage in Peter Pan and Oliver. She made her feature film debut in the 2000 romantic comedy Down to You, where she had a small role as a lovestruck woman. German appeared in a pictorial for Maxim's January 2002 issue and was placed as #47 in Maxim's "Hot 100 of 2002" list.

In 2002, German co-starred in the romantic drama A Walk to Remember with Shane West and Mandy Moore, based on Nicholas Sparks' 1999 novel of the same name. She played Belinda, a popular but mean-spirited high school girl who harbors unrequited love for Landon Carter (West). She then appeared in the crime/horror film Dead Above Ground, the drama A Midsummer Night's Rave, and the TV movie The Lone Ranger. In 2003, she auditioned to star in the remake of the classic 1974 horror film The Texas Chainsaw Massacre, but the role went to Jessica Biel, and German won the role of the hitchhiker.

German co-starred in the crime drama Born Killers (2005), the thriller Rx (2005), the romantic comedy Standing Still (2005), and the drama It Is Fine! Everything Is Fine. (2007). She also starred in the musical drama What We Do Is Secret with Shane West again, based on a true story. West played original Germs singer and German played The Go-Go's singer Belinda Carlisle.

She starred in the horror film Hostel: Part II. and the apocalypse thriller The Divide. She starred in the second season of the CBS police drama Hawaii Five-0 as DHS agent Lori Weston from 2011 to 2012. From 2012 to 2014, she starred as paramedic Leslie Shay in the NBC drama Chicago Fire. When her character was killed, her character's name was printed on the door of the ambulance in which she rode, as a memorial. She graced the cover of TV Guide magazine with her Chicago Fire co-stars on November 18, 2013.

German played the co-lead role of detective Chloe Decker in the Fox (and later Netflix) urban fantasy comedy-drama series Lucifer (2016–2021).

== Filmography ==
=== Film ===
Key
†	Denotes films that have not yet been released

Year	Title	Role
2000	Down to You	Lovestruck Woman
2002	A Walk to Remember	Belinda
2002	Dead Above Ground	Darcy Peters
2002	A Midsummer Night's Rave	Elena
2003	The Texas Chainsaw Massacre	Teenage Girl
2005	Rx	Melissa
2005	Standing Still	Jennifer
2005	Born Killers	Gertle
2007	It Is Fine! Everything Is Fine.	Ruth
2007	Spin	Cassie
2007	Love and Mary	Mary
2007	Hostel: Part II	Beth Salinger
2007	What We Do Is Secret	Belinda Carlisle
2008	Mating Dance	Abby
2009	Made for Each Other	Catherine
2009	Dark Country	Gina
2011	The Divide	Eva
2027	The Life Golden †	TBA (Post-production)
TBA	Best Pancakes in the County †	TBA (Post-production)

=== Television ===
Year	Title	Role	Notes
2000	Undressed	Kimmy	
2001	Shotgun Love Dolls	Beth	TV movie
2001	7th Heaven	Marie	Episode: "Apologize"
2002	Going to California	Tiffany	Episode: "A Little Hard in the Big Easy"
2003	The Lone Ranger	Emily Landry	TV movie
2005	Sex, Love & Secrets	Rose	
2006	Surrender, Dorothy	Maddy	TV movie
2010	Happy Town	Henley Boone / Chloe	
2011	Human Target	Angie Anderson	Episode: "Kill Bob"
2011	Memphis Beat	Kaylee Slater	Episodes: "Identity Crisis", "The Feud"
2011–12	Hawaii Five-0	Lauren "Lori" Weston	Main cast (season 2) (Note: Technically guest for 3 episodes, then elevated to main cast)
2012–15	Chicago Fire	Leslie Shay	Main cast (seasons 1–2), 3 episodes (season 3)
2014	Chicago P.D.	Leslie Shay	2 episodes
2016–21	Lucifer	Chloe Decker	Main cast
