= The Protector (American TV series) =

Police procedural drama television series

- Promotional poster
- Also known as: Exit 19
- Genre: Police procedural; Drama
- Created by: Michael Nankin; Jeffrey Jackson Bell
- Starring: Ally Walker; Tisha Campbell-Martin; Miguel Ferrer; Chris Payne Gilbert; Terrell Tilford; Thomas Robinson; Sage Ryan
- Composer: Gabriel Mann
- Country of origin: United States
- Original language: English
- No. of seasons: 1
- No. of episodes: 13

Production
- Executive producers: Jeffrey Jackson Bell; Nina Wass; Gene Stein; Allison Cross
- Producers: Jody Worth; Elle Triedman; Michael S. Chernuchin; Christine Roum; Caroline James; Peter O'Fallon; Sean Ryerson
- Cinematography: Walt Lloyd
- Editors: Mitch Stanley; Chris Peppe; Kurt Courtland; Rick Tuber; David J. Siegel (pilot only)
- Running time: 43–60 minutes
- Production companies: ABC Studios; Wass/Stein Productions; Jefftopia Productions

Original release
- Network: Lifetime
- Release: June 12 – September 19, 2011

The Protector (also known as Exit 19), is an American police procedural drama television series starring Ally Walker as Gloria Sheppard, a single mother who struggles to maintain the balance between her personal and professional life as an LAPD homicide detective.

The series was broadcast in the United States on the cable channel Lifetime, and is a co-production between ABC Studios and Wass-Stein Productions. It premiered on June 12, 2011, and ended on September 19, 2011. It was created by Michael Nankin and Jeffrey Jackson Bell.

On September 8, 2011, Lifetime announced it would not renew the series for a second season. The series finale aired on September 19, 2011.

== Overview ==
The series follows Gloria Sheppard, an LAPD detective attached to the Robbery-Homicide Division. A recent divorcée and single mother, Gloria has to perform her duties as an LAPD homicide detective while raising her twin sons. Gloria's brother, Davey Sheppard, whose house she recently moved into, helps to raise her two sons Nick and Leo. While at work, Gloria must solve some of Los Angeles' highest profile crimes with the assistance of her partner, Detective Michelle Dulcett as well as Detectives Ramon "Romeo" Rush, Buerge, and Van Stone, while being overseen by her commanding officer, Lieutenant Felix Valdez.

== Cast and characters ==
=== Main ===
- Ally Walker as Gloria Sheppard – An LAPD Detective attached to the Robbery-Homicide Division.
- Tisha Campbell-Martin as Michelle Dulcett – An LAPD Detective II. She is Gloria Sheppard's partner in the Robbery-Homicide Division.
- Miguel Ferrer as Felix Valdez – An LAPD Lieutenant. He is Gloria Sheppard's superior officer in the Robbery-Homicide Division.
- Chris Payne Gilbert as Davey "Dave" Sheppard – Gloria Sheppard's brother and uncle to Leo and Nick Sheppard.
- Terrell Tilford as Ramon "Romeo" Rush – An LAPD police officer and later Detective, attached to the Robbery-Homicide Division.
- Thomas Robinson as Leo Sheppard – Gloria Sheppard's youngest son.
- Sage Ryan as Nicholas "Nick" Sheppard – Gloria Sheppard's oldest son.

=== Recurring ===
- Larry Joe Campbell as Detective Ted Buerge – An LAPD Detective attached to the Robbery-Homicide Division.
- James Hanlon as Detective Joe Van Stone – An LAPD Detective attached to the Robbery-Homicide Division.
- Karly Rothenberg as Marlene – Loyal secretary to Lt. Valdez
- Marianne Chambers as Nora Fitzpatrick
- McKinley Freeman as Patrick 'Trick' Purcell
- Patty Duke as Gloria's mom

== Development and production ==
Originally known as Exit 19, The Protector was initially developed by Jeffrey Jackson Bell, based on a script written by Michael Nankin, in late 2007. In early 2008, CBS placed an order for a pilot presentation for Exit 19. Bell wrote the pilot. Nankin was attached to the project as director, with Jeffrey Jackson Bell, Nina Wass, and Gene Stein serving as executive producers. The pilot was a co-production of ABC Studios, CBS Television Studios, and Wass-Stein Productions. It was described as being about "a quirky homicide detective on the mean streets of Manhattan who also is a single mom to two kids in the suburbs on Long Island." Geena Davis was the first to be cast in the pilot as 'Gloria'. She also served as co-executive producer. Next to join the pilot was Matthew Lillard as Gloria's younger brother. Rosie Perez, Ramon Rodriguez, and Amy Farrington were the last actors to be cast, with Perez playing 'Lorna', Gloria's partner on the NYPD, Rodriguez playing 'a smart flirty cop who works with Gloria and Lorna', and Farrington playing Gloria's neighbor. On May 10, 2008, it was announced that CBS had decided not to pick up the pilot to series.

In July 2009, Lifetime announced it was redeveloping the pilot. In June 2010, the network placed a pilot order.

Casting announcements began in November 2010, with Ally Walker first to be cast. Walker portrays Gloria Sheppard, a Los Angeles Police Department homicide detective who is juggling her demanding personal and professional lives while raising two children. Next to join the series was Tisha Campbell-Martin and Chris Payne Gilbert, with Campbell-Martin playing Michelle Dulcett, Gloria's smart and vivacious partner, and Gilbert playing Davey Sheppard, Gloria's younger brother, a recovering alcoholic, with whom she shares the house the two co-own. Last to be cast was Miguel Ferrer playing Lieutenant Felix Valdez, Gloria's boss.

The network green lighted the series on February 7, 2011, with an order of 13 hour-long episodes. The series is a co-production between ABC Studios and Wass-Stein Productions.

On May 3, 2011, during the network's 2011–2012 upfronts presentation, Lifetime announced that Exit 19 had been retitled The Protector and would debut in the summer of 2011.

On September 8, 2011, Lifetime announced it would not renew the series for a second season. The series finale aired on September 19, 2011.

== Episodes ==
No.	Title	Directed by	Written by	Original release date	U.S. viewers (millions)
1	"Pilot"	Peter O'Fallon	Story by : Michael Nankin & Jeffrey Bell; Teleplay by : Jeffrey Bell	June 12, 2011	1.89
LAPD homicide detective Gloria Sheppard and her partner Michelle Dulcett probe a fatal mugging that may have been a targeted murder. At home, Gloria is tasked with creating a play costume for her youngest son.
2	"Help"	Sanford Bookstaver	Michael S. Chernuchin	June 19, 2011	1.49
A powerful player in the fashion industry is murdered and detectives wonder if it is an anomalous event. Meanwhile, Gloria is unhappy that Davey is dating the babysitter.
3	"Class"	Martha Mitchell	Elle Triedman	June 26, 2011	1.22
When a college professor is found stabbed in her apartment, Gloria and Michelle are on the case to find that parents, students and faculty will do anything to get into the prestigious school. At home, Gloria finds that Nick tested high on a test and is known as "gifted". Gloria has to make the choice as to whether or not to pay for private school that will cost more than she wants to pay.
4	"Spoon"	Peter O'Fallon	Jeffrey Bell	July 10, 2011	1.16
A young couple known as the Newlywed Bandits are found dead on the day they were supposed to report to jail, and a double suicide is suspected. However, Gloria and Michelle unearth evidence that then takes the case in a different direction. Meanwhile, Nick's nonstop texting with a girl raises concern for Gloria.
5	"Revisions"	Peter O'Fallon	Alison Cross	July 17, 2011	1.24
A successful plastic surgery doctor is found murdered in his hot tub and Gloria starts to think that this was personal. When she discovers the real killer, she will stop at nothing to make sure that they get what they deserve. James, Gloria's ex-husband, comes for a visit so that they can close on the house and things get a little "heated".
6	"Beef"	Christine Moore	Jody Worth	July 24, 2011	1.21
After a food truck owner is murdered in his truck, Gloria and Michelle investigate the possibilities that it could be in retaliation to the owner refusing to pay a protection racket fee. Gloria is also forced to do a ride-along to help raise money for Leo's school.
7	"Wings"	Jeff Bleckner	Christine Roum	August 1, 2011	0.85
Gloria and Michelle are surprised when the murder of a young woman found floating in a downtown lake leads them into a world of kinky sex parties. Meanwhile, Gloria and Davey's lives are complicated by an unexpected visit from their mother.
8	"Bangs"	Bethany Rooney	Michael S. Chernuchin	August 8, 2011	0.60
After a famous hairstylist is found dead and suicide is the theory, Gloria suspects foul play and together, she and Michelle go and find the killer. Meanwhile, Davey has a double life that Gloria starts to suspect that he has relapsed.
9	"Affairs"	Paul Holahan	Elle Triedman	August 15, 2011	N/A
A woman known for dating policemen is murdered, and the evidence suggests a cop may be the killer. Meanwhile, Davey's growing popularity with the women in the neighborhood results in some free meals but a huge headache for Gloria.
10	"Rats"	Kenneth Fink	Allison Cross & Michael S. Chernuchin	August 22, 2011	N/A
Gloria and Michelle's investigation into the death of a lab researcher leads them to believe it was a drug-related murder. Elsewhere, Nick blackmails Davey after he sees him kissing Nora.
11	"Blood"	Sanford Bookstaver	Christine Roum	August 29, 2011	N/A
Gloria and Michelle investigate a bartender's murder at a family-owned Mexican restaurant. Meanwhile, Gloria's mother (Patty Duke) makes an extended visit.
12	"Ghosts"	Peter O'Fallon	Jody Worth	September 12, 2011	0.47
Detectives Duclett and Rush investigate the robbery of a high-stakes poker game; Gloria waits to testify for the district attorney.
13	"Safe"	Jeannot Szwarc	Jeffrey Bell & Michael S. Chernuchin	September 19, 2011	N/A
Gloria and Michelle investigate the murder of a bookstore owner whose hippie lifestyle masked dark secrets. Meanwhile, Rush considers telling Michelle how he feels about her, and Gloria invites Brennan over for a family dinner.

== International broadcasting ==
Country	Network	Premiere date
Canada	CTV 2	Fall 2011
Italy	Fox Crime (Italy)	24 August 2012
Norway	FEM	24 July 2012
United Kingdom	Alibi	29 October 2012
Finland	Liv	1 June 2014

== Reception ==
=== Critical reception ===
The Protector has received mixed to average reviews, earning a score of 53 on Metacritic. The New York Daily News said of the series: "Where Army Wives can get soapy at times, it also starts with a premise that sets it apart. The Protector doesn't start with that advantage." The New York Times gave a mixed review: "Ms. Walker is an appealing actress with a strong presence, but in the pilot, at least, her character isn't as well formed or well written as other tough-talking television dames." The Pittsburgh Post-Gazette gave the pilot a positive review:

The Protector is fairly routine plot-wise but the breezy tone—conveyed through upbeat music and snappy dialogue—and strong, collegial performances make this series a welcome summer diversion.

=== Ratings ===
The pilot episode premiered with 1.90 million total viewers, scoring 0.9 million viewers in the 18–49 demographic.

Season	Season Premiere			Season Finale		
Season	Date	Viewers Total (in millions)	Viewers 18–49	Date	Viewers Total (in millions)	Viewers 18–49
1	June 12, 2011	1.90	0.85	September 19, 2011	—N/a	—N/a
