= Diplomatic Immunity (New Zealand TV series) =

Television series

- Genre: Sitcom
- Created by: James Griffin
- Directed by: Murray Keane; Simon Bennett
- Starring: David Fane; Craig Parker; Lesley-Ann Brandt; John Leigh; Mario Gaoa; Kayte Ferguson; Hannah Marshall
- Opening theme: "There Is No Depression in New Zealand" by the Wellington International Ukulele Orchestra
- Ending theme: "There Is No Depression in New Zealand" by the Wellington International Ukulele Orchestra
- Composer: Joel Haines
- Country of origin: New Zealand
- Original language: English
- No. of series: 1
- No. of episodes: 13

Production
- Executive producers: John Barnett; Simon Bennett; James Griffin
- Producer: Chris Hampson
- Cinematography: Dave Garbett
- Editor: Lisa Hough
- Running time: 24 minutes
- Production company: South Pacific Pictures

Original release
- Network: TV One
- Release: 10 March – 9 June 2009

Diplomatic Immunity is a New Zealand sitcom that follows the misadventures at the consulate of The Most Royal Kingdom of Fe'ausi and a fallen New Zealand Foreign Affairs high-flier who has been sent in to straighten out the consulate staff. The show screened in New Zealand on TV One, every Tuesday night at 10:00.

== Synopsis ==
After a public disgrace, Leighton Mills (Craig Parker) is sent to the Royal Consulate of Fe'ausi. He must stop the dodgy dealings of its staff and all the silly behaviour around the office including illegal weddings and April Fool's Day jokes taken too far, and try to encourage the immature ambassador Jonah Fa'auigaese (David Fane) to do the right thing. Meanwhile, he is attracted to Jonah's daughter, Leilani (Lesley-Ann Brandt), and attempts to avoid the rest of the consulate staff.

== Cast and characters ==
=== Main ===
- David Fane as Jonah Fa'auigaese: Jonah is the Fe'ausi ambassador to New Zealand and brother of King Gideon, the reigning monarch. A Machiavellian master politician who can go from great eloquence to feigned fresh-off-the-boat-ness with consummate skill, he truly believes that all the dodgy deals and morally questionable decisions he makes are for the good of his people.
- Craig Parker as Leighton Mills: Leighton is the fallen rising star of New Zealand Foreign Affairs. Ambitious and urbane, Leighton was an aspiring diplomat. An unfortunate incident involving alcohol; the randy daughter of a minor British Royal; the backseat of the Queen's limo and the paparazzi, saw his fledgling career nipped in the bud. Leighton has been shipped north from Wellington to Auckland, as a diplomatic attaché, attached to the consulate of The Most Royal Kingdom of Fe'ausi.
- Lesley-Ann Brandt as Leilani Fa'auigaese: Leilani is an intelligent, outspoken woman. But lately she has become a problem. Leilani has led the men of Fe'ausi on, while forcing them to listen to political ideas. Her popularity with men has made her extremely unpopular with the women. Thus Leilani has been deported to New Zealand, to be with her father; Jonah, who just wants to hide her away because she is severely endangering his chance to land the job of King. She has a phobia of whales.
- John Leigh as Mick Fa'auigaese: Mick is a funny wee guy with a mysterious past and an even more mysterious present. With no morals to speak of, he's like a human cockroach, scurrying from one deal to the next and trying at all costs, to avoid the light. Mick is the albino adopted second cousin of the king.
- Mario Gaoa as Malepe Fa'auigaese: Malepe is the son of a cousin of the King. He specialises in hanging out and looking cool - and getting parking tickets outside strip clubs, of course.
- Kayte Ferguson as Suga Fa'auigaese: Suga is the niece of a cousin of the King. She has come to New Zealand to marry a rich white man, and to have many babies. Suga is officially, the consulate Tourist Affairs liaison.
- Hannah Marshall as Kirsty: Kirsty is the effervescent, irreplaceable heart and soul of the embassy. She questions nothing and does everything that is asked of her. Kirsty is pretty much the only one who does any legitimate work round the consulate. She also knows everything that is going on and is quite happy to use her knowledge to stir things up a bit.

=== Guest ===
- Natalie Medlock as Princess Grace: The French princess whom Leighton was caught with, which got him sent to the consulate. She marries Mick.
- Jason Hoyte and Johnathan Brugh as Brother Jacob and Brother John: Two brothers who want to marry desperately. They find it okay to marry more than one woman. They have a habit of asking Kirsty to marry them.
- Robbie Magasiva as Prince To'omai: Prince To'omai is the prince of the country of Fa'akofa. He is very handsome, but extremely stupid. He was to marry Leilani, but Leighton hides the key to the room where the traditional shagashaga is to be held, so the wedding was called off. To'omai likes many wives, who are blonde.
- Pua Magasiva as The Niu: The Niu is the carrier of the diplomatic pouch. He is an avid surfer and all the women in the consulate are attracted to him. His stupidity leads him to pick up a dangerous spider and bring it to the consulate. Leighton finds out he is gay.
- Paul Barrett as Lewis Moorecock: A gay financial advisor whom the consulate adores. He writes them a musical about Sir Edmund Hillary.
- Sarah Owen as Janice: A whale protestor who chains herself to the consulates fence. She has a vast knowledge of all whales. She also protests seal beatings.
- Michelle Langstone as Svetlana: a woman Jonah falls for.
- Madeleine Sami as Agent Amy Bickler: A secret agent who suspects Leilani of being a terrorist. She is slightly loopy and pretends to be Leighton's girlfriend in case people are secretly watching them.

== Episodes ==
No.	Title	Directed by	Written by	Original release date
1	"Let's Get It On"	Murray Keane	James Griffin	March 10, 2009
Leighton arrives at the consulate and becomes attracted to Leilani and appalled by the consulate's way of doing things.
2	"Idiot Wind"	Murray Keane	Sarah Nathan & James Griffin	March 17, 2009
It's Fo'alafa Day, the Fe'ausian equivalent of April Fools' Day, and pranks take a turn for the worse.
3	"Tattoo You"	Murray Keane	Dave Armstrong & James Griffin	March 24, 2009
In an attempt to buy Leighton off with the baubles of power, the Fe'ausians want to make him the first ever non-Fe'ausian Aratika (high chief). But everything does not go as planned.
4	"Love My Way"	Simon Bennett	Tim Balme & James Griffin	March 31, 2009
Leighton arrives at the consulate to find it in the throes of preparing for many weddings. Most of which are for members of a polygamous quasi-religious sect - and Leilani is included.
5	"War!"	Simon Bennett	James Griffin	April 7, 2009
In the wake of Leilani's cancelled marriage to Prince To'omai, Fe'ausi has declared war on Fa'akofa. Leighton does his best to stop the escalation of hostilities between the two proud nations.
6	"Boris the Spider"	Murray Keane	James Griffin	April 14, 2009
The arrival of this week's diplomatic pouch in the hands of Niu, Fe'ausi's surfing legend, brings with it not just the usual contraband but something much more unpleasant.
7	"Climb Every Mountain"	Murray Keane	Dave Armstrong & James Griffin	April 28, 2009
For once it is Leighton who must try to save the Fe'ausians from their own greed, as they plan to sink all the money they have made from the phosphate mining into an extremely dodgy musical.
8	"Strange Fruit"	Murray Keane	Tim Balme & James Griffin	May 6, 2009
The annual Frangipani Festival showcase of Pacific Island culture gives Leighton the chance to book his ticket out of his Fe'ausian consulate hell.
9	"Chain of Fools"	Murray Keane	James Griffin	May 12, 2009
An anti-whaling protester chains herself to the consulate gates while out the back of the consulate in Mick's hiding shed, there are cans of corned whale waiting to be exported to Japan.
10	"Graceland"	Murray Keane	Geoff Houtman & James Griffin	May 19, 2009
Leighton gets a blast from the past as Princess Grace (the reason he was consigned to the Fe'ausian consulate) drops in for a surprise visit, after coming out of her latest stint of rehab.
11	"All Eyez on Me"	Murray Keane	Joss King & James Griffin	May 26, 2009
Jonah has a new woman in his life - Svetlana. But is Jonah being played, and has he become the victim of a honey trap?
12	"Food for Thought"	Murray Keane	James Griffin	June 2, 2009
The King has listened to the evil Royal Nutritionist and has gone on a diet - which means that every Fe'ausian must go on the same diet - and it's vegan.
13	"Spy in the House of Love"	Murray Keane	James Griffin	June 9, 2009
The War on Terror comes to Fe'ausi. Bumabuma Day, the Fe'ausian equivalent of Guy Fawkes Day, looms. But that isn't all as Leighton has been contacted by the SIS - New Zealand's secret service. The SIS think that Leilani is a terrorist. While Leighton tries to save the day, Jonah has an idea for what they are going to blow up for Bumabuma Day. But everything is resolved as Leighton's car - and the files on Leilani in it - are destroyed as his car turns into a bonfire.
