= Jake Muxworthy =

American movie and TV actor (born 1978)

Jake Muxworthy (born September 10, 1978) is an American movie and TV actor. Jake's first appearances in big roles were in the early 2000s, after doing many cameo roles previously. He mostly appears in horror and thriller projects. He has also appeared in short films such as Michelle Branch's video 'Everywhere'. He received his first role as a paramedic in Cradle 2 the Grave. Almost immediately, this was followed by a part as 'Tim' in the comedy I Heart Huckabees.

== Life and career ==
Jake was born on September 10, 1978, in Twisp, Washington. Jake has accepted his first lead, as 'John,' the comparatively less twisted of a psychopathic serial killer's two sons, in Morgan J. Freeman's film Born Killers (2005). In the 2007 film Borderland he plays Henry, one of a group of three college students who discover a human sacrifice cult in a Mexican border town. He extended his record of disturbing and dark material by landing a lead role as Holt alongside Sarah Roemer in the horror film Asylum (2008).Holt is one of several students who must try to free the possessed campus. He is the protagonist in the 2009 film Shadow, where he plays 'David,' who returns from traumatic military service in Iraq only to discover a much more horrifying lost Nazi experiment camp in the Alps.

== Filmography ==
=== Movie ===
Year	Film	Role	Release	Notes
2009	Shadow	David	-	-
2008	Asylum	Holt	-	-
2008	Justin 'two dogs'	-	-	-
2008	The Third Nail	Cory	-	-
2007	The Take	Jimmy Grannis	-	-
2007	Borderland	Henry	-	-
2005	Born Killers	John	-	-
2005	Waterborne	Bodi	-	-
2004	I Heart Huckabees	Tim	-	-
2004	Just Hustle	Randy Messenger	-	-
2003	Grind	Pro	-	-
2003	Cradle 2 the Grave	Paramedic	-	-

=== Television ===
Year	Show	Role	Run	Notes
2008	CSI: NY - Dead Inside	Tanor Sommerset	Series	-
2007	Saving Grace - Taco, Tulips, Duck & Spices	Kip Garvey	Series	-
2007	Without a Trace - Skin Deep	Jon Pratt	Series	-
2005	24	Gary	Series	-
2005	Medical Investigation: Half Life	Harry Rush	Series	-
2005	Third Watch: In the Family Way	Harry	Series	-
2004	American Dreams: Can't Hold On	Eric	Series	-

=== Short films ===
Year	Title	Role	Note
2010	Fallout	Damien	-
2007	At The Beach	-	-
2004	Idolizing Victor	Travis Topper	-
2001	Laud Weiner	Kip	-
