= Chris Payne Gilbert =

American actor (born 1972)

- Born: 1972 (age 53–54); Springfield, Massachusetts
- Occupation: Actor
- Years active: 1998–present
- Spouse: Lesley-Ann Brandt (m. 2015)
- Children: 1
- Website: chrispaynegilbert.com

Chris Payne Gilbert is an American actor. He is best known for his television role as Todd on the TBS sitcom 10 Items or Less (2006–2009).

He also appeared in episodes of television series Dexter, Burn Notice, Moonlight, Shark, Bones, The Shield, Friends, CSI: Miami, Sex and the City and Charmed. His roles in a feature film include The Broken Hearts Club, Story of a Bad Boy, Saving Manhattan, The Irish Vampire Goes West and Life Blood. In 2011, he was cast as Davey Sheppard on the Lifetime drama series The Protector (2011). In 2012, he guest starred on Criminal Minds and Fairly Legal. He also portrayed protagonist Alex Mason in Call of Duty: Black Ops Cold War. He also appeared as John Decker, Chloe's father, in Lucifer.

== Personal life ==
Gilbert married his girlfriend Lesley-Ann Brandt in 2015, after a three-year relationship. The couple have a son, born in July 2017.
