= Lesley-Ann Brandt =

South African actress (born 1981)

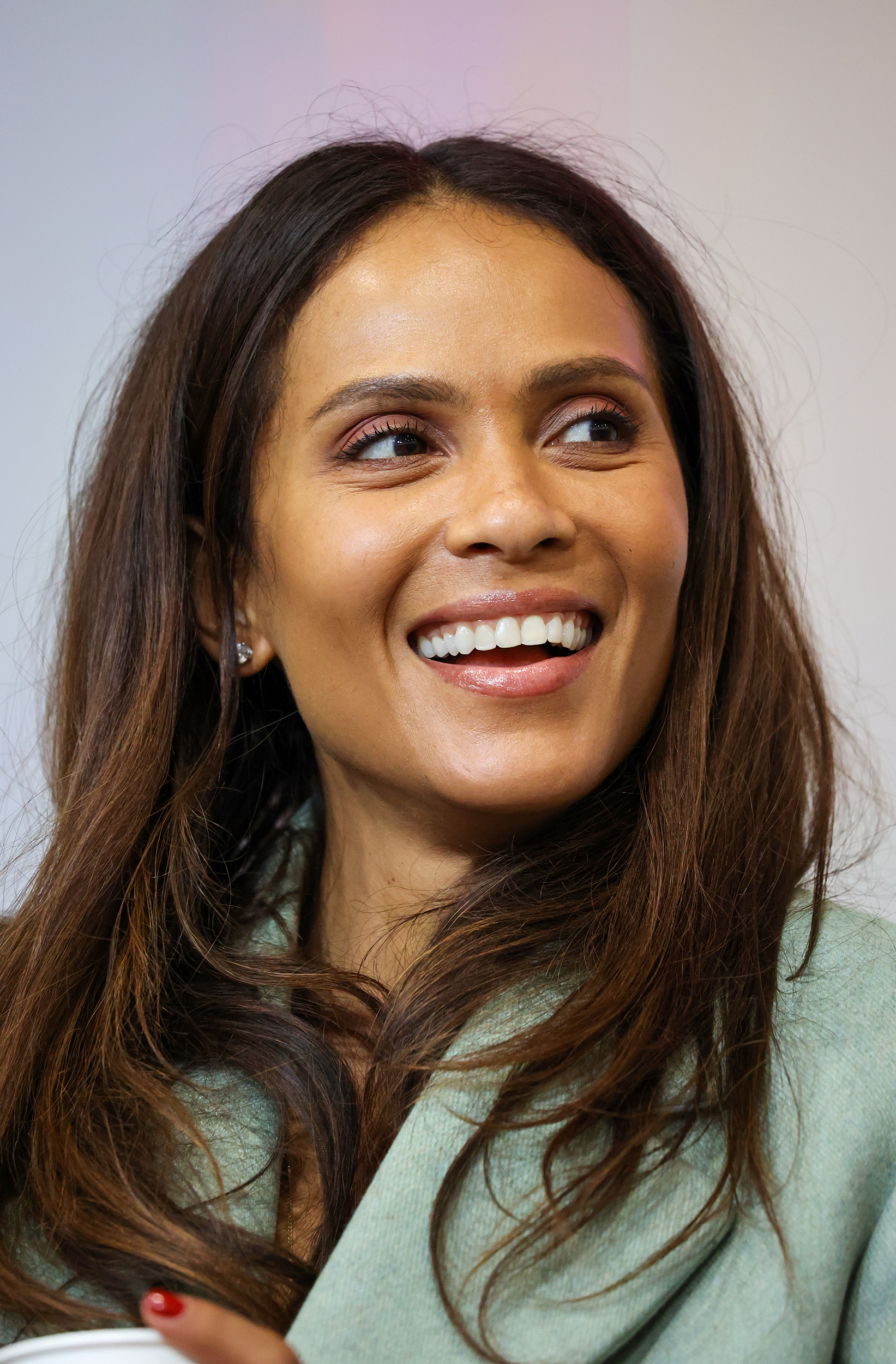
- Brandt during a Lucifer Convention in Paris in 2022
- Born: 2 December 1981 (age 44); Cape Town, Cape Province, South Africa
- Citizenship: South Africa; United States
- Education: Meisner technique
- Occupation: Actress
- Years active: 2007–present
- Known for: Spartacus; Lucifer
- Spouse: Chris Payne Gilbert (m. 2015)
- Children: 1

Lesley-Ann Brandt (born 2 December 1981) is a South African and American actress best known for the role of Mazikeen on the television series Lucifer (2016–2021).

== Early life ==
Born in Cape Town, South Africa, Brandt is Cape Coloured of African Khoisan, Indian, German, Dutch, San, Spanish and Portuguese descent. She is a fluent Afrikaans speaker and lists yoga, hockey, and baseball among her interests. In South Africa, she played competitive field hockey.

In 1999, Brandt immigrated to Auckland, New Zealand, with her parents and her younger brother Brian Brandt. Brandt started work in retail sales in Auckland before securing work as an information technology recruitment consultant. Following some modelling work, she was cast in a number of New Zealand television advertisements. She studied acting and was trained in the Meisner technique in 2008.

== Career ==
Brandt's first significant acting role was in the New Zealand television series Diplomatic Immunity. Brandt has appeared in guest roles on the New Zealand hospital soap opera, Shortland Street, and This Is Not My Life, a science fiction series set in the 2020s in the fictional town of Waimoana.

Brandt had a role as Naevia in the first season Spartacus: Blood and Sand and the prequel miniseries Spartacus: Gods of the Arena. She originally auditioned for the role of Sura but auditioned for the role of Naevia instead. Brandt did not return due to production delays following the death of Andy Whitfield, and for Spartacus: Vengeance she was replaced by Cynthia Addai-Robinson. Brandt had a role in the New Zealand coming-of-age feature film The Hopes & Dreams of Gazza Snell about the victim of a kart racing accident, was filmed in Howick, a suburb of East Auckland.

Brandt guest starred in the CSI: NY episodes "Smooth Criminal" and "Food for Thought". Brandt was featured in the film InSight in which she plays nurse Valerie Khoury. In May 2010, Brandt guest starred on Legend of the Seeker, another Rob Tapert/Sam Raimi production filmed in New Zealand. She appeared in the second-season finale "Tears" in the role of Sister Thea. In 2011, she guest appeared in TNT's Memphis Beat, which was followed by a lead role as Cassie in Syfy's highest rated original feature for 2011, Zombie Apocalypse, which also starred Ving Rhames and Taryn Manning. She appeared in the feature film Drift with Sam Worthington and Xavier Samuel, and Duke starring CSI: NY star Carmine Giovinazzo.

In 2013, she had a recurring role in the third season of Single Ladies as Naomi Cox. In 2014, she guest starred as Larissa Diaz/Copperhead on Gotham, and appeared as the recurring character Lamia in The Librarians. In 2015, she won the role of Maze in the FOX television series Lucifer. She replaced actress Lina Esco and Brandt had reportedly tested for the role and was reconsidered afterward.

Brandt is based in Los Angeles.

== Personal life ==
Brandt married her boyfriend of six years, actor Chris Payne Gilbert, in 2015. The couple have a son, born in 2017. Brandt stated on 13 July 2023 that she became an American citizen on the same day of the SAG strike.

== Filmography ==
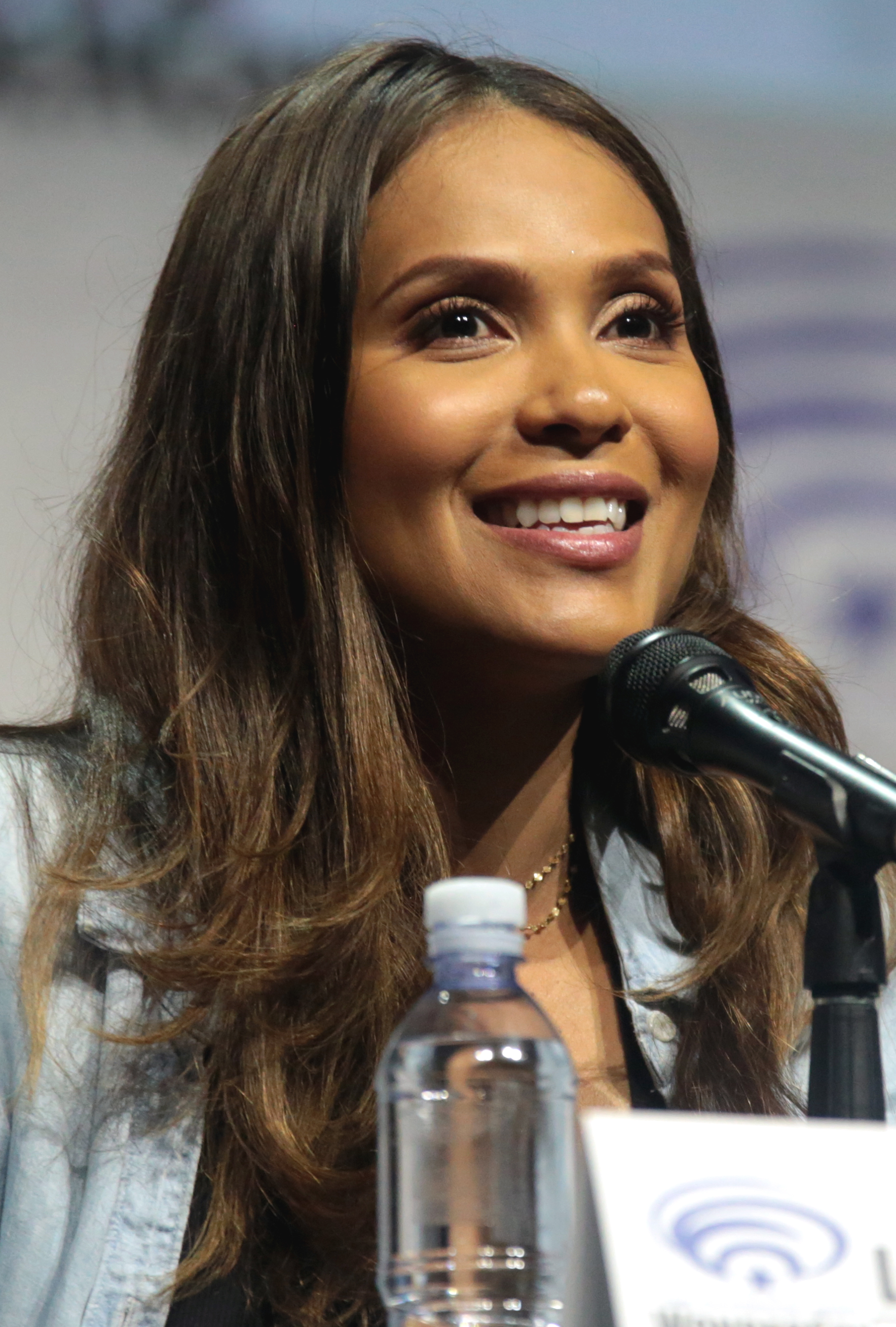
Brandt at the 2017 WonderCon, to promote Lucifer.

=== Film ===
Year	Title	Role	Notes
2010	The Hopes & Dreams of Gazza Snell	Sharon	
2011	InSight	Valerie Khoury	
2012	A Beautiful Soul	Angela Barry	
2013	Drift	Lani	
2015	Painkillers	Guts	
2019	Duke	Violet	
2019	Heartlock	Tara Sharpe	
2021	Horror Noire	Abbie	

=== Television ===
Year	Title	Role	Notes
2009	Diplomatic Immunity	Leilani Fa'auigaese	13 episodes
2010	Legend of the Seeker	Sister Thea	Episode: "Tears"
2010	This Is Not My Life	Hine / WAI Field Reporter	2 episodes
2010–2011	Spartacus: Blood and Sand	Naevia	17 episodes
2011	Chuck	Fatima Tazi	Episode: "Chuck Versus the Seduction Impossible"
2011	CSI: NY	Camille Jordanson	2 episodes
2011	Memphis Beat	Adriana	Episode: "The Things We Carry"
2011	Zombie Apocalypse	Cassie	Television film
2014	Being Mary Jane	Tamiko Roberts	Episode: "Girls Night In"
2014	Killer Women	Amber Flynn	Episode: "In and Out"
2014	Single Ladies	Naomi Cox	11 episodes
2014	Gotham	Larissa Diaz / Copperhead	Episode: "Lovecraft"
2014	The Librarians	Lamia	5 episodes
2016–2021	Lucifer	Mazikeen, Lillith	Mazikeen: Main Cast (Seasons 1–6), Lilith: (Season 5, Episode 4)
2023	Captain Fall	Liza Barrel (voice)	Main cast
2024	The Walking Dead: The Ones Who Live	Pearl Thorne	3 episodes

=== Music videos ===
Year	Band	Title	Character	Director
2007	Battle Circus	"Love in a Fallout Shelter"	Lead Female	Anton Steel
2007	Nesian Mystik	"R.S.V.P."	Lead Female	Luke Sharpe
