= Mazikeen =

- Mazikeen, riding out to battle

Publication information
- Publisher: DC Comics
- First appearance: Sandman (vol. 2) #22 (December 1990)
- Created by: Neil Gaiman (writer); Kelley Jones (artist)

In-story information
- Species: Lilim
- Place of origin: Red Sea
- Notable aliases: Mazikeen "Maze" Smith
- Abilities: Demon physiology; Superhuman strength, speed, stamina, durability, endurance, agility, reflexes, senses; Immortality; Accelerated healing factor; Martial artist and hand-to-hand combatant; Knife thrower; Armed and unarmed combatant; Swordswoman; Tracker; Shapeshifting; Agelessness

Mazikeen is a character who appears in American comic books published by DC Comics. She is one of the Lilim, a child of Lilith. She first appeared in The Sandman (vol. 2) #22 (December 1990), and was created by Neil Gaiman and Kelley Jones. Her name comes from the term "Mazzikin", invisible demons which can create minor annoyances or greater dangers according to Jewish mythology.

Mazikeen appeared in the television series Lucifer (2016–2021), portrayed by Lesley-Ann Brandt, and in the drama series The Sandman (2022), portrayed by Cassie Clare.

== Fictional character biography ==
In the comic book series Lucifer, Mazikeen is a devoted ally and lover to Lucifer Morningstar. She has also been the war leader of the lilim, a race of warriors descended from Lilith that have been exiled. A great warrior and admired leader, Mazikeen is a prominent character in the Lucifer comics. She has the appearance of a human female with long bluish-black hair. Mazikeen first appeared in The Sandman, where she was Lucifer's servant while he reigned in Hell. At the time, half of her face was normal, but the other half was horribly misshapen and skeletal (not unlike the half-corpse appearance of the goddess, "Hel/Hell/Hela", from Norse mythology), causing her speech to be nearly unintelligible with Lucifer being the only person who understands her. Gaiman wrote Mazikeen's dialogue by trying to speak using only half of his mouth and writing down phonetically what came out.

When Lucifer resigned, Mazikeen left Hell and ended up following her master (even when he tells her to stop following him), becoming part of the staff at the Lux (Latin for light), an elite Los Angeles bar that Lucifer had opened and at which he played piano. To conceal her demonic nature, she covered the deformed half of her face with a silver mask and rarely spoke. In Lucifer, Mazikeen's face was turned fully human when she was resuscitated by the Basanos following the destruction of the Lux in a fire. This was because the vessel of the Basanos, Jill Presto, did not realize that Mazikeen's face was naturally deformed, and assumed that it was burned in the fire.

When Lucifer refused to assist her in restoring her face to its former state, she defected to her family, the Lilim-in-Exile. As their war leader, she led their army against Lucifer's cosmos, allying herself briefly with the Basanos. However, this was a ruse; after a desperate gamble, she bought Lucifer enough time to destroy the Basanos and regain control of his creation. Even during her defection, she is shown crying alone in her war leader tent, and she is repeatedly seen as a fierce defender of Lucifer and his goals.

With a new whole face, she initially desired Lucifer to remove the magic that was caused by Presto's wish. After saying that it would take considerable effort and time, she relented and began wearing the half-mask that she had before. She has since worn it intermittently, usually when engaged in battle or on a mission from Lucifer, such as her voyage to the Mansions of Silence.

Issue #72 of Lucifer saw a dramatic change in the character of Mazikeen. Lucifer, while making his preparations to leave Yahweh's creation forever, transfers a portion of his power to Mazikeen. The portion of the power was the power that Yahweh gave to Lucifer in the beginning had now been given to Mazikeen. This angers Mazikeen greatly, however, as she sees this move as Lucifer running away from and shirking all of his responsibilities. She lashes out against Lucifer with her sword, scarring his face before she leaves him. She tells him that he can heal his face if he chooses, but it will make him a coward.

Mazikeen and her mother Lilith did not get along, and Lilith eventually tried to kill her. It is notable though, that Mazikeen took no part in the events during the battle of Armageddon that led to her mother's death. During the latter part of the series, Mazikeen was engaged in a sexual relationship with a human woman named Beatrice (a former Lux employee), who admitted that she had been in love with her for years. Beatrice was eventually cast out into the desert on Lilith's orders, but she was rescued by Elaine. In issue #74, Elaine gives her friends an ending as happy as possible. When it comes to Mazikeen, Elaine notes the "I wouldn't dare" in response to the question of if she planned to give Mazikeen one. She then adds that Beatrice works at the bar that they were in earlier.

During the course of the Lucifer series, a few details of Mazikeen's past are revealed. Issue #14 establishes that Lilith bore her children, presumably including Mazikeen, while living on the shores of the Red Sea. Mazikeen's father is identified as the serpent demon Ophur—a fact which allowed Mazikeen to drink and regurgitate venom (which is the only power she has). The one-shot story 'Lilith' in issue #50 reveals Mazikeen's childhood with her mother by the Red Sea. At this time, Mazikeen appeared as a normal human child, fiercely defensive of her mother and with a streak of cruelty. A flashback in issue #75 shows Mazikeen first entering Lucifer's service when she comes to Hell to seek asylum for an undisclosed reason. By this time her face is misshapen in the manner first seen in The Sandman.

After Lucifer left this creation in issue #75 of the original series, as revealed in the new series Mazikeen took over as ruler of Hell, whereupon her lilim brothers nailed her hands to the throne to effectively hold her prisoner. She freed herself from the nails by having the fallen archangel Gabriel hack off her hands after he swore fealty to her, after which she reattached her hands and fought a duel with Lucifer and Izanami's son, Takehiko, for the rulership of Hell. She then returned to Lucifer Morningstar and followed him again, plotted to kill the New God, who had been resurrected as an evil deity.

== In other media ==
=== Lucifer (2016-2021) ===
Mazikeen appears in the Fox/Netflix TV series Lucifer, portrayed by Lesley-Ann Brandt.

Mazikeen, frequently referred to as "Maze" for short, is the confidante and devoted ally of Lucifer Morningstar. "Forged in the bowels of Hell to torture the guilty for all of eternity", Maze is an archdemon who, after having served for eons as his head torturer, accompanied Lucifer "through the gates of Hell", up to Earth (five years prior to the events of the series), where her first act, at Lucifer's instructions, was to cut off his angel wings with her twin Karambit-esque knives "forged in Hell".

At the beginning of the series, Maze is serving as head bartender at Lucifer's club, the Lux, as well as his personal bodyguard, concierge, and adjutant. She engages in relations with Lucifer's angel brother, Amenadiel, and even sacrifices her chance to return to Hell in order to save him.

In season 2, Maze, unable to return to Hell, starts looking for a new direction on Earth. She later becomes a bounty hunter, having found something that felt right to her. Maze also moves in with Det. Chloe Decker and her daughter, Trixie, whom Maze, surprisingly, gets along with. Additionally, this season tests Maze's relationship with Dr. Linda Martin, her therapist-turned-bestie who discovers her secret.

By season 3, Maze has become much more emotionally human, while still retaining her demonic sense of humor and fascination with weapons.

Later, she marries Eve, the first woman, ex-wife of Adam, the first man.

Mazikeen has been described as pansexual.

In Season 5, Lucifer promises Mazikeen to make her the Queen of Hell after he becomes God followed by the retirement of his father.

=== The Sandman (2022) ===
Mazikeen makes an appearance in the Netflix fantasy drama series The Sandman (2022), portrayed by Cassie Clare. Like her comic book and Lucifer counterparts, she serves as Lucifer Morningstar's confidante in Hell.
