= Roll-out shelf =

Shelf with drawer slides

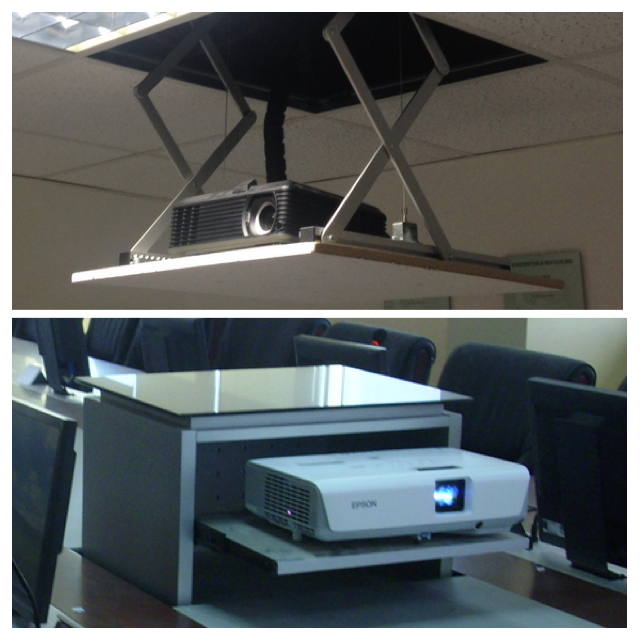
Top: A projector on a lift table so that it can be raised in and out of the ceiling. Bottom: A projector on a roll-out shelf beneath a table.

A roll-out shelf, also known as a glide-out shelf, pull-out shelf, sliding shelf, or slide-out shelf is a shelf that can be moved forward in order to more easily reach the contents stored in the back of a cupboard or cabinet without having to bend over. They may also save space, as they can be installed closer together than fixed shelves.

Patents for roll-out shelves exist at least as early as the 1800s.

== Applications ==
Roll-out shelves are found in kitchen and bathroom cabinets, pantries, chests of drawers, vanities, offices, and garages. They can be mounted with hardwood cleats, or with metal slides. 3/4 extension slides provide enough access to reach items in the back of the cabinet. Full extension rails are more costly but can provide better access for special use areas.

Some roll-out shelves include shallow wire or mesh baskets.

== See also ==
- Drawer (furniture)
- Kitchen appliance lift
