= White Famous =

American television comedy series

- Genre: Sitcom
- Created by: Tom Kapinos; Chris Spencer; Buddy Lewis
- Starring: Jay Pharoah
- Composers: Dhani Harrison; Paul Hicks
- Country of origin: United States
- Original language: English
- No. of seasons: 1
- No. of episodes: 10

Production
- Executive producers: Jamie Foxx; Jamie King; Tom Kapinos
- Camera setup: Single-camera
- Running time: 30 minutes
- Production companies: Aggressive Mediocrity, Inc. Foxxhole Productions; Lionsgate Television

Original release
- Network: Showtime
- Release: October 15 – December 10, 2017

White Famous is an American sitcom starring Jay Pharoah, based on the life of Jamie Foxx, which aired on Showtime from October 15, 2017, until December 10, 2017.

It is co-created by Tom Kapinos, Chris Spencer and Buddy Lewis, directed by Tim Story and Foxx, who will also be a recurring guest star.

On December 29, 2017, the series was canceled after one season.

== Premise ==
White Famous follows a talented, young African-American comedian, Floyd Mooney, whose star is rising, forcing him to navigate the treacherous waters of maintaining his credibility as he begins to cross-over toward becoming “'white famous.'”

The series is set in the same universe as Kapinos's previous show, Californication, and features some secondary characters from that series.

== Cast and characters ==
- Jay Pharoah as Floyd Mooney
- Utkarsh Ambudkar as Malcolm
- Cleopatra Coleman as Sadie Lewis
- Jacob Ming-Trent as Ron Balls
- Lonnie Chavis as Trevor Mooney
- Meagan Good as Kali
- Stephen Tobolowsky as Stu Beggs
- Natalie Zea as Amy Von Getz
- Michael Rapaport as Teddy Snow
- Jack Davenport as Peter King
- Lyndon Smith as Gwen
- Jamie Foxx as himself

== Episodes ==
No.	Title	Directed by	Written by	Original release date	US viewers (millions)
1	"Pilot"	Tim Story	Teleplay by : Tom Kapinos; Story by : Tom Kapinos, Chris Spencer & Buddy Lewis	September 29, 2017 (online); October 15, 2017 (Showtime)	0.154
2	"Heat"	Tim Story	Tom Kapinos	October 15, 2017	0.129
3	"Woo"	Tim Story	Tom Kapinos	October 22, 2017	0.196
4	"Appetites"	Ken Whittingham	Tom Kapinos	October 29, 2017	0.266
5	"Life on Mars"	Millicent Shelton	Tom Kapinos	November 5, 2017	0.339
6	"Wolves"	Michael Lehmann	Tom Kapinos	November 12, 2017	0.297
7	"Duality"	Seith Mann	Tom Kapinos	November 19, 2017	0.271
8	"Make Believe"	Michael Lehmann	Tom Kapinos	November 26, 2017	0.222
9	"Scandal"	Seith Mann	Tom Kapinos	December 3, 2017	0.287
10	"Zero F**ks Given"	Tim Story	Tom Kapinos	December 10, 2017	0.333

== Reception ==
The first season of White Famous was met with a mixed to negative response from critics. On the review aggregation website Rotten Tomatoes, as of January 2018, the first season held a 58% approval rating with an average rating of 5.64 out of 10 based on 26 reviews. Metacritic, which uses a weighted average, assigned the season a score of 54 out of 100 based on 20 reviews, indicating "mixed or average reviews".
