= List of Californication episodes =

Californication is an American comedy-drama television series created by Tom Kapinos for Showtime. The show stars David Duchovny as Hank Moody, a famous writer trying to juggle his career, his relationship with his daughter and his ex-girlfriend, as well as his appetite for sex.

During the course of the series, 84 episodes of Californication aired over seven seasons, between August 13, 2007, and June 29, 2014.

== Series overview ==
Season	Episodes	Originally released	
Season	Episodes	First released	Last released
1	12	August 13, 2007	October 29, 2007
2	12	September 28, 2008	December 14, 2008
3	12	September 27, 2009	December 13, 2009
4	12	January 9, 2011	March 27, 2011
5	12	January 8, 2012	April 1, 2012
6	12	January 13, 2013	April 7, 2013
7	12	April 13, 2014	June 29, 2014

== Episodes ==
=== Season 1 (2007) ===
The first season of Californication premiered August 13, 2007 and ended October 29, 2007. The season follows Hank Moody and the other main characters in the months leading up to the marriage of Hank's ex-girlfriend Karen and Bill, a Los Angeles publisher. Hank is wallowing deep in self-loathing following the release of A Crazy Little Thing Called Love, which he perceives as a sub-par yet popular movie adaptation to his most recent novel, God Hates Us All.

After picking up a younger woman in a bookstore, Hank finds out that she is actually Bill's 16-year-old daughter, Mia. Hank spends most of his time drinking and not writing. Meanwhile, Mia continues to haunt Hank during his visits to his family, using the threat of exposing his statutory rape of her to steal stories for her creative writing class. The death of his father triggers an alcohol fuelled binge and an eventual sexual encounter with Karen.

After his father's funeral, Hank stays in New York to finish a manuscript for a new novella. When Hank returns to LA, the original copy is lost when he is carjacked. Mia has retained her own copy, and tries to pass the work off as her own. At her father's wedding she has to deny that the book is about her having sex with Hank. On Karen and Bill's wedding day, Hank chooses to accept Karen's choice, but as he leaves the reception with Becca, Karen runs out and jumps into the car, riding off into a new life together.

No. overall	No. in season	Title	Directed by	Written by	Original release date
1	1	"Pilot"	Stephen Hopkins	Tom Kapinos	August 13, 2007
We meet 40ish Hank Moody (David Duchovny) in a church asking Jesus to help him get his life back on track and being distracted by a hot nun: This turns out to be a dream representative of his lifestyle. Sex-addicted Hank sleeps with many women, including a woman who is cheating on her enraged, muscular husband; and Mia (Madeline Zima), a 16-year-old girl who Hank had assumed was older. He shares custody of wise-beyond-her-years daughter Becca (12) with her mother, his ex-girlfriend Karen, whom he still loves although she wants to move on.
2	2	"Hell-A Woman"	Scott Winant	Tom Kapinos	August 20, 2007
Becca invites Hank to Karen and Bill's (Damian Young) house for a dinner party with mutual friends. When he arrives, he realizes that Karen has fixed him up with her Scientologist friend Sonja (Paula Marshall). This doesn't thrill Hank at first, but later the other guests walk in on him and Sonja in the bedroom. He also gets some news about the job he recently accepted.
3	3	"The Whore of Babylon"	Scott Winant	Tom Kapinos	August 27, 2007
Hank gets into a fight with Todd Carr (Chris Williams), the director of "A Crazy Little Thing Called Love", the movie adaptation of Hank's book. Hank ends up in jail, Bill bails him out, and Hank finds a new connection to Meredith (Amy Price-Francis). Charlie (Evan Handler) discovers a different side of his assistant Dani (Rachel Miner).
4	4	"Fear and Loathing at the Fundraiser"	Michael Lembeck	Daisy Gardner	September 3, 2007
Meredith convinces Hank to escort her to an environmental fundraiser. Bill and Karen are at the same event and Karen makes a scene. Hank discovers Dani and Charlie in his office.
5	5	"LOL"	Bart Freundlich	Susan McMartin	September 10, 2007
Bill asks Hank to step in as a guest speaker at Mia's creative-writing class. Hank talks about his writing and motivations on a radio interview. Becca develops a crush on her guitar teacher Dave (Joaquin Pastor), but he ends up with Mia.
6	6	"Absinthe Makes the Heart Grow Fonder"	Ken Whittingham	Tom Kapinos & Eric Weinberg	September 17, 2007
Hank spends the night with a sexy surfer girl (Michelle Lombardo), who robs him. Mia wants more of Hank's writing to pass her class; he offers to help her with her writing instead. Charlie wants to spice up sex with his wife Marcy (Pamela Adlon), but she's not as fond of spanking as Dani is.
7	7	"Girls, Interrupted"	Tucker Gates	Gina Fattore	September 24, 2007
Hank is disturbed by Becca's negative reaction towards the concept of happy endings, even more so when he finds out that it is partially his fault. Marcy suggests a threesome with Charlie and Dani, but it ends unexpectedly.
8	8	"California Son"	Scott Winant	Tom Kapinos	October 1, 2007
Hank's father Al (Mark Margolis) dies. Hank tries to ease his pain with hooker Trixie (Judy Greer), but Karen actually wants to do her best to help him overcome the pain.
9	9	"Filthy Lucre"	Scott Burns	Ildy Modrovich	October 8, 2007
After his father's funeral, Hank comes back to L.A. with a new manuscript that he wants Karen to read. After receiving a bonus paycheck, he buys a new car for himself and a new guitar for Becca.
10	10	"The Devil's Threesome"	John Dahl	Tom Kapinos	October 15, 2007
A new threesome including Hank and Charlie evolves from a meeting at the gym; during Karen and Marcy's girls'-night-out they decide to surprise Hank and Charlie.
11	11	"Turn the Page"	David Von Ancken	Gina Fattore & Eric Weinberg	October 22, 2007
Charlie and Dani represent Mia after she wrote a book that seems to have come out of Hank's feather. Becca decides to move out of Bill and Karen's home to live with her dad.
12	12	"The Last Waltz"	Scott Winant	Tom Kapinos	October 29, 2007
In the season finale, Hank must deal with Karen's wedding and Becca's first period. Becca kisses her guitar teacher at her mom's wedding. Runckle and his wife rekindle their relationship. Bill decides to let his daughter publish the novel she stole from Hank. The season ends with Karen running to Hank's car and running off with Hank and Becca.

=== Season 2 (2008) ===
Californication's second season premiered September 28, 2008 and ended December 14, 2008. The newly reunited couple of Hank and Karen seem to be working, their house is on the market, and Becca seems happy again. Hank gets a vasectomy and attends a party thrown by Sonja, whom he'd been with in the first season. A mistake and a fight with an obnoxious police officer lands Hank in jail, where he meets world-famous record producer Lew Ashby, who commissions Hank to write his biography.

After too much office masturbation costs him his job, Charlie decides to go into the porn industry. He becomes the agent/paternal-figure of porn star Daisy and finances her movie, "Vaginatown". Marcy goes into rehab for her cocaine addiction and Charlie starts an affair with Daisy. Hank proposes to Karen on the night that they discover that Hank could be the father of Sonja's child. When Karen says no, Hank decides that they can no longer be together.

Hank moves in with Ashby, who starts a romance with Mia. Becca finds a boyfriend named Damien. Mia's book becomes a hit and Ashby holds a party in its honor, where Damien cheats on Becca and Charlie decides to divorce Marcy to get together with Daisy. After the party Hank goes looking for Lew when his "one-that-got-away" girlfriend arrives, but Ashby dies of an overdose of heroin he had mistaken for cocaine.

Hank finishes Ashby's biography. Charlie ends up working at a BMW dealership in the San Fernando Valley. When Sonja's baby is born, Hank is cleared of being the father because the child is half-black. As Hank and Karen turn toward each other again, Karen is offered a job in New York. Hank looks forward to going back there with her, but when Damien and Becca reconcile, Hank decides it would be wrong to remove Becca from Los Angeles, so he and Becca will stay in L.A. while Karen moves to New York. The season closes with Karen's plane leaving for New York and Hank and Becca walking on the Venice boardwalk.

No. overall	No. in season	Title	Directed by	Written by	Original release date
13	1	"Slip of the Tongue"	David Duchovny	Tom Kapinos	September 28, 2008
Hank and Karen decide to move back to New York, so they try to sell their house in Los Angeles. Meanwhile, Karen persuades Hank to get a vasectomy.
14	2	"The Great Ashby"	David Von Ancken	Tom Kapinos	October 5, 2008
After Hank is arrested and sent to jail, he meets record producer Lew Ashby (Callum Keith Rennie), who asks Hank to write his biography. Charlie is fired after videos of him masturbating in the office are shown to his boss.
15	3	"No Way to Treat a Lady"	John Dahl	Gina Fattore	October 12, 2008
A prostitute who is acquainted with Ashby and Hank claims that Hank is better in bed. Karen comes under the spell of a self-help guru. Charlie pitches himself as an agent and offers to help Daisy with her porn career.
16	4	"The Raw & the Cooked"	David Von Ancken	Tom Kapinos	October 19, 2008
A botched proposal, a paternity revelation, and an allergic reaction to sashimi derail Hank and Karen's dinner party.
17	5	"Vaginatown"	Ken Whittingham	Jay Dyer	October 26, 2008
Hank moves into Lew's mansion and sleeps with a cooking-show host. Charlie becomes a major investor in his newest client's latest adult film.
18	6	"Coke Dick & First Kick"	Michael Lehmann	Gina Fattore & Gabriel Roth	November 2, 2008
Hank wants to locate Lew's long-lost first love. Sonja and Julian decide to have an open relationship. Mia spends the day being followed by a Rolling Stone reporter. Charlie's house becomes a set.
19	7	"In a Lonely Place"	Jake Kasdan	Tom Kapinos	November 9, 2008
Hank becomes interested in Becca's teacher. Charlie discovers that Marcy has been hiding a secret.
20	8	"Going Down and Out in Beverly Hills"	Danny Ducovny	Daisy Gardner	November 16, 2008
Hank tries to get the truth about Ashby, and Karen confronts the record producer. Marcy detoxes at her mother's house. Charlie succumbs to temptation.
21	9	"La Ronde"	Adam Bernstein	Gina Fattore	November 23, 2008
Hank declines an offer. Karen goes on a date with Ashby. Charlie and Daisy bond. Marcy remains on the mend.
22	10	"In Utero"	David Von Ancken	Tom Kapinos	November 30, 2008
Hank awaits test results and reflects on his early days with Karen. Daisy plans to move out.
23	11	"Blues from Laurel Canyon"	Michael Lehmann	Gina Fattore	December 7, 2008
Ashby hosts a party to celebrate the publication of Mia's book; Becca is devastated to catch Damien cheating on her. Charlie destroys his marriage. Ashby collapses at a most inopportune time. Guest appearance by Mädchen Amick.
24	12	"La Petite Mort"	Bart Freundlich	Tom Kapinos	December 14, 2008
Hank completes his biography of Ashby; Charlie is reduced to working at a car dealership; Sonja gives birth; Karen accepts a job offer back home in New York, forcing Hank and Becca to make painful choices.

=== Season 3 (2009) ===
The third season of Californication premiered September 27, 2009 and ended December 13, 2009.

No. overall	No. in season	Title	Directed by	Written by	Original release date	U.S. viewers (millions)
25	1	"Wish You Were Here"	David Duchovny	Tom Kapinos	September 27, 2009	0.821
With Karen back in New York, Hank must deal with rebellious Becca. Charlie and Marcy cohabitate although they intend to divorce.
26	2	"The Land of Rape and Honey"	Bart Freundlich & David Von Ancken	Tom Kapinos	October 4, 2009	0.772
Hank starts work as a college professor of a writing class and gets into trouble with an unexpected admirer; Charlie deals with Marcy's new boyfriend.
27	3	"Verities & Balderdash"	David Von Ancken	Gina Fattore	October 11, 2009	0.739
Hank and Becca attend the annual English Department Fall Mixer hosted by Dean Koons and his wife Felicia. Charlie tries to coax Marcy into celebrating his first signing at the new agency, teen idol Rick Springfield.
28	4	"Zoso"	Bart Freundlich	Tom Kapinos	October 18, 2009	0.773
Hank needs to address his problems with Becca's decidedly adult fashion sense; Hank and Charlie head to a strip joint where a student might be moonlighting.
29	5	"Slow Happy Boys"	David Von Ancken	Tom Kapinos	October 25, 2009	0.773
Becca visits Karen in New York for a weekend and Hank is on his own until his old friend from Long Island, Mike Zlosowski (Kevin Corrigan) shows up. The pair have a great time at Sue Collini's party. Meanwhile, Charlie and Marcy's resumed sex life is abruptly interrupted by the revelation of a secret.
30	6	"Glass Houses"	Michael Lehmann	Gina Fattore	November 1, 2009	0.820
Karen visits Los Angeles and Hank must deal with her discovery of his affairs--and with her plan to move the family to New York. Meanwhile, Charlie must deal with Marcy's crush on Rick when he's invited to dinner.
31	7	"So Here's the Thing..."	John Dahl	Daisy Gardner	November 8, 2009	0.762
Hank's attempts to set things right with Karen lead to even deeper entanglements with the campus ladies. Meanwhile, Charlie tries to prevent Sue's top client from leaving the agency; and Becca scolds Hank for being a terrible role model for her.
32	8	"The Apartment"	Adam Bernstein	Tom Kapinos	November 15, 2009	0.828
Hank and Karen's Skype video chat gets disconnected; then he opens his door to Jackie, two strippers, and a bottle of liquor. The next morning, one of the strippers remains unconscious. When Charlie shows up with Rick, their attempts to help only make things worse. Finally, things really get complicated with the arrivals of Jill, Felicia, Stacy, Chelsea, and Becca.
33	9	"Mr. Bad Example"	John Dahl	Gina Fattore & Matt Patterson	November 22, 2009	0.773
Hank expects to be fired after his affairs are revealed, but Dean Koons tells him otherwise. The principal of Becca and Chelsea's school contacts them and reports that the girls' physical confrontation has gotten them expelled. When the parents meet at the principal's office, one of the affairs is revealed to Karen. Meanwhile, Charlie risks his job trying to keep Marcy away from drug-addict Rick.
34	10	"Dogtown"	Seith Mann	Tom Kapinos & Gina Fattore	November 29, 2009	0.894
When Charlie loses his job, Hank takes him out on the town. Hank and Charlie steal one of Hank's autographed books from a bookstore and have a near-fatal run-in with two robbers at a liquor store. Meanwhile, Karen, Becca, and Marcy have a girls' night out.
35	11	"Comings & Goings"	David Von Ancken	Gina Fattore & Daisy Gardner	December 6, 2009	0.913
On the eve of their departure for New York, Karen, Hank, and Becca have a final lunch with Felicia, during which Dean Koons arrives intent on challenging Hank to a duel. Meanwhile, Charlie and Marcy are optimistic about a possible offer on the house.
36	12	"Mia Culpa"	Stephen Hopkins	Tom Kapinos	December 13, 2009	1.055
Hank, Karen, and Becca are packing for their move when Mia returns to L.A. with her new agent boyfriend, Paul Rider (James Frain), who knows that Hank statutory-raped her. Hank tries to convince Mia not to tell everyone of their consensual sex, then resorts to violence against Paul. After leaving Mia's, Hank tells Karen everything just as the police arrive to arrest him. Meanwhile, Charlie considers having his vasectomy reversed, but Marcy seems to want to finalize the divorce.

=== Season 4 (2011) ===
No. overall	No. in season	Title	Directed by	Written by	Original release date	U.S. viewers (millions)
37	1	"Exile on Main St."	David Von Ancken	Tom Kapinos	January 9, 2011	0.848
Just as Hank is released from 72 hours in jail for assault, he's picked up by Charlie, who reveals that the recent events of Fucking & Punching with Mia have become public and drops him into a meeting with young actress Sasha Bingham, who wants to capitalize on the publicity and make a movie out of F&P. He later re-enacts the script with her in her hotel room. The episode ends with Hank's lawyer informing him that the assault charges have been dropped--then he is arrested for statutory rape.
38	2	"Suicide Solution"	David Duchovny	Tom Kapinos	January 16, 2011	0.554
Informed that he faces 3 years in prison because the DA wants to make an example of him, Hank tries to fix things with Becca. The episode ends as Hank, high on drugs and liquor, writes a letter to Becca and passes out.
39	3	"Home Sweet Home"	Adam Bernstein	Tom Kapinos	January 23, 2011	0.432
Hank takes advantage of the misperception that he tried to commit suicide and moves back home with Karen and Becca, but he eventually tells his daughter the truth; Charlie sets out to reach a sexual benchmark while a wealthy producer pursues Marcy.
40	4	"Monkey Business"	Bart Freundlich	Gabe Roth & Matt Patterson	January 30, 2011	0.645
Hank, Runkle, and the other guys from the film-project group have dinner with an important investor. When they go to the investor's house afterwards, Runkle accidentally kills the investor's pet monkey, and the investor dies from an erotic act.
41	5	"Freeze-Frame"	Beth McCarthy Miller	Tom Kapinos	February 6, 2011	0.418
Mia testifies for Hank's case, going on the record that she slept with Hank knowing that he was unaware of her age. Charlie gets unexpected news and learns his vasectomy may have been botched. Karen starts dating a new guy. Hank, Sasha, and Mia get better acquainted.
42	6	"Lawyers, Guns and Money"	John Dahl	Vanessa Reisen	February 13, 2011	0.520
A sensational photo derails Hank's case; Karen resuscitates Hank's relationship with Abby.
43	7	"The Recused"	Michael Weaver	Tom Kapinos	February 20, 2011	0.550
Abby pitches Hank's case to a senior partner; Hank is dismayed by Karen's relationship with Ben; Marcy and Stu ask Charlie for help.
44	8	"Lights. Camera. Asshole"	Adam Bernstein	Tom Kapinos	February 27, 2011	0.513
Hank takes a gig rewriting dialogue; Marcy tells Stu she is pregnant.
45	9	"Another Perfect Day"	Michael Lehmann	Tom Kapinos & Gabe Roth	March 6, 2011	0.469
After getting evicted, Hank moves in with Karen and Becca; Becca and Pearl steal the Porsche.
46	10	"The Trial"	Seith Mann	Tom Kapinos	March 13, 2011	0.633
Hank's trial turns into an all-out character assassination, with even friendly witnesses Charlie and Karen unable to portray him as anything other than a drunken, oversexed lout. It is revealed that Hank and Mia had met before the night they slept together, with Hank not remembering the meeting due to him being in a drunken stupor. Abby becomes nervous the case may be lost.
47	11	"The Last Supper"	John Dahl	Tom Kapinos	March 20, 2011	0.369
Hank gets the verdict and briefly considers fleeing Los Angeles. He gets the cash from his on-set work rewriting dialogue for Sasha, buys a new Porsche, and promptly smashes the right headlight. A party is thrown at Karen's and the four old friends hang out smoking and remembering the good old days. Hank and Trixie hang out again for a little massage.
48	12	"...And Justice for All"	Adam Bernstein	Tom Kapinos	March 27, 2011	0.547
Hank awaits sentencing and visits the set of his movie. Everyone gather for dinner at Stu's, where Marcy reveals that her baby is Charlie's. Hank almost drowns in the pool but is saved by Ben. Karen, Becca, and Ben leave on a cross country trip in an RV.

=== Season 5 (2012) ===
No. overall	No. in season	Title	Directed by	Written by	Original release date	U.S. viewers (millions)
49	1	"JFK to LAX"	John Dahl	Tom Kapinos	January 8, 2012	0.758
The narrative begins 3 years after Season Four, soon after the successful release of Hank's new novel, Californication, when Hank breaks up with his latest lover Carrie (played by Natalie Zea) in New York. Depressed at the unpleasant breakup, he unquestioningly accepts Charlie's invitation to return to L.A to meet a potential client, hip-hop artist Samurai Apocalypse (played by RZA). On the flight he almost joins the Mile High Club with a woman named Kali (Meagan Good) he later learns is Apocalypse's main squeeze. While in L.A., Hank visits Karen and Becca and meets Karen's new husband (also old foe), Bates. Later he meets Becca's new boyfriend Tyler. The episode ends with Hank learning that his New York girlfriend has just torched his apartment.
50	2	"The Way of the Fist"	David Duchovny	Tom Kapinos	January 15, 2012	0.751
Hank continues to consider writing Sam's new movie, then decides against it after a brief but not-so-good meeting with the movie's director, Peter Berg (playing himself). During a night at a local club with Sam, Hank spots Becca's boyfriend Tyler making out with another girl. After confronting him, he decides to talk to Becca about Tyler instead of lashing out at him. He doesn't end up telling Becca what he saw, but Sam and his men decide to teach Tyler a lesson that lands him in the hospital. Meanwhile, Charlie, Marcy, and Stu deal with Stuart, who has exposed himself to a preschool classmate.
51	3	"Boys & Girls"	Seith Mann	Tom Kapinos	January 22, 2012	0.641
Finding himself in debt to Sam for Tyler's beating, Hank finishes writing Sam's film script. Later, as he tries again to leave for New York, Sam asks him to take Kali out on the town. Tyler recovers from his injuries at Karen and Becca's. Marcy and Stu leave little Stuart with Charlie when they go out, and Charlie pays too much attention to new nanny Lizzie (Camilla Luddington).
52	4	"Waiting for the Miracle"	Bart Freundlich	Tom Kapinos	January 29, 2012	0.748
Hank receives an unwelcome surprise from Carrie, his New York ex-girlfriend, then is forced to bring her along to a dinner party at Karen's that evening. The party soon gets out of control as Stu, Marcy, and Bates get talking about sexual proclivities. The party abruptly ends when Carrie realizes and reveals something about Hank. Meanwhile, Lizzie (Stuart's new nanny) fixes up Charlie with a blind date named Mary.
53	5	"The Ride-Along"	Millicent Shelton	Tom Kapinos	February 5, 2012	0.742
Charlie's boyhood dream and Hank's worst nightmare come true when Sam invites them on a ride-along in a Santa Monica Police Department car to research his film role. The ride soon becomes a joyride, which turns sexually awry for Charlie. Thanks to Tyler, Bates drinks excessively at a Venice restaurant, but Hank and the guys arrive to save the day for Karen and Becca. Tyler mentions that he recognizes Sam from somewhere, causing realizations for some and trouble for Hank.
54	6	"Love Song"	Eric Stoltz	Tom Kapinos	February 12, 2012	0.834
While Karen is still upset about what she thinks Hank did to Tyler, Sam asks Hank to help Kali write love-song lyrics. Hank tries to understand Kali better so he can write more sincere lyrics, so she tells him about her feelings when she came to LA. This makes Hank flash back to his and Karen's move to LA. Later, Karen tells Hank she might have made a big mistake being with Bates, who won't stop drinking.
55	7	"Here I Go Again"	Michael Weaver	Tom Kapinos	February 19, 2012	0.714
On another drinking binge, Bates unknowingly sleeps with exotic dancer Holly, and Hank tries to pick up the pieces in order to keep Karen from being humiliated. Fired as Marcy's nanny, Lizzie asks Charlie to help her get her job back; at the last minute Marcy begs her to return.
56	8	"Raw"	Bart Freundlich	Tom Kapinos	March 4, 2012	0.668
Hank gets stuck reading Tyler's script discovering hidden talent (though the script appears to be a disturbingly autobiographical account of his relationship with Becca) and subsequently meets his parents. Charlie and Lizzie defile Marcy's marital bed, but hear a little more than they bargain for when Marcy and Stu come back early and are up for a little roleplay.
57	9	"At the Movies"	Helen Hunt	Tom Kapinos	March 11, 2012	0.680
Movie production starts for Sam's movie, Santa Monica Cop, but Hank jeopardizes his friendship with Sam by having a rendezvous with the lead actress. Charlie continues his relationship with Lizzie and attempts to sign Tyler to his talent group. Hank gets released from Sam's movie and has a blowup with Charlie; he fires Charlie as his agent and as his friend.
58	10	"Perverts & Whores"	Bart Freundlich	Tom Kapinos	March 18, 2012	0.637
Hank crashes with Karen and Becca while looking for power agent Larry Levine; when he finds him, Levine quickly sets up a meeting with German filmmaker and idol Lars Manderhoff; Hank also bumps into old flame Trixie (Judy Greer). Emotional and distraught from recent losses, Charlie seeks comfort from Marcy while dealing with Lizzie getting her big-break role in Santa Monica Cop thanks to Stu.
59	11	"The Party"	Michael Lehmann	Tom Kapinos	March 25, 2012	0.725
Hank overstays his welcome at Karen's and prepares to hit the road with one last stop at Malibar. There he bumps into Lizzie, who uses her new acting skills to lure him back to Charlie's place, which is full of his loved ones, plus Sam, Kali, Tyler, and Gabriel (Bates' sponsor). The party ends abruptly when Hank has a run-in with Tyler after catching him with Kali in the bathroom.
60	12	"Hell Ain't a Bad Place to Be"	Adam Bernstein	Tom Kapinos	April 1, 2012	0.768
As he sleeps in his car outside of Karen's house, Hank has a nightmare starring his late friend Lew Ashby as a bartender in hell. When he wakes up and enters the house, Bates announces that he has decided to leave Karen; this offers the possibility of Hank and Karen reuniting and starting a new life in their former home. Hank meets Becca during her work break and she announces that Tyler has proposed to her. On the set of Santa Monica Cop, Sam's jealousy and fondness for firearms give Charlie an opportunity to show how much he loves his best friend and number-one client; Carrie (Natalie Zea), the New York ex-girlfriend, returns and offers Hank a drink. He drinks it and Carrie reveals it's laced with prescription anti-depressants. As they succumb to the drugs she remarks on how their bodies will be discovered together, and pleads with Hank to tell her he loves her. As Hank seems to lose consciousness he has a vision of Karen, to whom he says ‘I love you’, and the screen goes black.

=== Season 6 (2013) ===
No. overall	No. in season	Title	Directed by	Written by	Original release date	U.S. viewers (millions)
61	1	"The Unforgiven"	David Duchovny	Tom Kapinos	January 13, 2013	1.070
Hank wakes up in the hospital after overdosing from being drugged by Carrie (Natalie Zea), the New York ex-girlfriend, and he starts experiencing being haunted by her in his dreams. Becca announces to Hank that she broke up with Tyler, much to Hank's delight, and she expresses interest in dropping out of school to pursue a career being a writer. This concerns Hank and Karen as they do not want to see her take the road that Hank did. Hank accompanies Charlie to a meeting with rock musician Atticus Fetch (Tim Minchin) who has expressed interest in creating a Broadway musical based on a novel by Hank. An intervention from Karen, Becca, Charlie, and Marcy due to concern of his behavior, increased drinking, and past experiences leads Hank to decide to enroll in a rehabilitation center.
62	2	"Quitters"	John Dahl	Tom Kapinos	January 20, 2013	0.749
While in rehab, Hank adjusts well during his time there and meets many other patients. One that particularly stands out is a stunningly beautiful woman and "muse" named Faith (Maggie Grace). Meanwhile, Charlie, posing as a homosexual agent, signs an award-winning gay actor named Robbie Mac (Johann Urb) as a client. Marcy deals with the return of Stu. Karen unknowingly gets a job as an interior designer for a house belonging to the wife of rock musician Atticus Fetch.
63	3	"Dead Rock Stars"	Adam Bernstein	Tom Kapinos	January 27, 2013	0.889
Hank continues his time in rehab and makes a trip to the outside world when he decides to accompany Faith to a funeral of an old flame of hers who was a childhood friend of Atticus Fetch. Charlie meets up with Robbie to discuss potential film projects. Karen starts her job as an interior designer and goes to Atticus' house where she surprisingly finds Hank, blacked out and sleeping on the floor, with several other guests from the party.
64	4	"Hell Bent for Leather"	David Von Ancken	Tom Kapinos	February 10, 2013	0.753
Charlie wrangles Hank into a remake of Cruising with Robbie Mac. After agreeing to the film, Hank, Charlie, Robbie Mac, and former executive on Crazy Little Thing Called Love (and now studio head) Ali Andrews go out to a gay bar. Hank, while ordering a drink, sees Richard Bates (Jason Beghe) who is working as a bartender for research for his latest book. Bates tells Hank that he and Becca talk regularly about writing; this somewhat troubles Hank as Becca has never talked to him about writing. Robbie moves the party back to Charlie's house where Hank and Ali make good on their previous sexual tension. Robbie ends up trying to have sex with Charlie but, unfortunately, Charlie is unable to bring himself to perform oral sex on Robbie and ends up admitting that he is not gay. Robbie kisses him and fires him. A distraught Charlie then walks in on Hank and Ali and explains what has happened. In light of this, Ali tells them that the project is off and she promptly leaves. Meanwhile, Marcy becomes closer to Ophelia Roberts (Maggie Wheeler), a strong feminist and self-proclaimed man hater who is seemingly taken by the idea of swearing off men.
65	5	"Rock and a Hard Place"	David Von Ancken	Tom Kapinos	February 17, 2013	0.669
Hank attempts to write a new project and Charlie gets fired at his job over the mishap with Robbie Mac. Both of them meet with Atticus Fetch about continuing their partnership on the proposed musical project. Atticus decides to send both of them to retrieve a guitar that belonged to a childhood friend, the deceased rock musician from the funeral, from a drug dealer (Jorge Garcia). They meet up with Faith and she guides them to the location. Karen continues her job as the interior designer of Atticus Fetch's house. Stu tries to reconcile with Marcy and thinks things are seemingly going well until Marcy, under the advice of Ophelia, makes Stu wear one of Ophelia's products to which he reluctantly agrees.
66	6	"In the Clouds"	David Von Ancken	Tom Kapinos	February 24, 2013	0.574
Hank tries to persuade Becca not to pursue a career in writing after hearing concerns from Karen. Hank and Charlie meet up with Atticus on his private plane during a flight to New York to provide him with inspiration for creating songs for the Broadway musical project. They are joined by Atticus' wife, the dead rock star's widow, and Faith. During the plane's landing, Charlie's fear of flying makes him extremely nervous and he ends up hooking up with the widowed wife. Hank has a rendezvous with Faith.
67	7	"The Dope Show"	Michael Weaver	Tom Kapinos	March 3, 2013	0.788
Hank and Charlie return from their New York flight with Atticus to find that Charlie's place is a huge mess after leaving it with Becca who decided to host a party while they were away. Hank and Karen decide to try and teach Becca a lesson about the life of a rock musician by taking her over to Atticus' home as an example. During their visit they meet Marilyn Manson, who is enjoying illegal substances with Atticus. Hank and Karen decide to leave after observing the crazy antics of Atticus and Marilyn. The plan appears to have worked however, as Becca, who initially liked Atticus' house and wanted to hang out with her idol Marilyn Manson, ends up leaving abruptly with her parents after witnessing the crazy antics between the two rock stars. Charlie spends time with his son Stuart and tries to rekindle his relationship with Marcy. Things do not go well after Marcy finds Charlie in a video on an adult website that is run by a parent whom Charlie met incidentally while spending time with Stuart at a kids restaurant.
68	8	"Everybody's a Fucking Critic"	Seith Mann	Tom Kapinos	March 10, 2013	0.693
Hank reviews Becca's draft of her writing project and tries to give advice to her. Hank royally screws up and it does not go over well. Karen, after hearing what happened, tells Hank that Becca has now changed her mind about writing and is thinking of going to law school. Hank finishes the musical script for Atticus only to find that Atticus doesn't like it, and neither does Stu nor Charlie. Hank doesn't take the criticism well and he decides to meet up with Faith for encouragement. Meanwhile, Charlie and Stu join forces when they believe that Marcy is being brainwashed by Ophelia's influence. The three of them meet up at a bar but things do not go well when Ophelia shows up making disparaging remarks. Things go south when Ophelia uses her taser on both Charlie and Stu, however, Marcy is put off by Ophelia's behavior. Hank meets up with Becca again and apologizes for his earlier remarks and fully encourages her to pursue a career in writing.
69	9	"Mad Dogs & Englishmen"	Adam Bernstein	Tom Kapinos	March 17, 2013	0.766
Atticus, now staying with Charlie after being kicked out by his wife, decides to throw a party there even though he is only a guest. Girls for the party are supplied by Faith, The Dealer (Jorge Garcia) returns to provide the recreational substances, and Hank's old friend Eddie Nero (Rob Lowe) provides the entertainment. Hank gets jealous when Karen attracts the attention of Eddie after she sees something going on between Hank and Faith. Atticus, newly single, turns his attention to "a fan" of his at the party. Charlie ends up reuniting with the dead rock star's widow. Faith's feelings for Hank start to go beyond her control.
70	10	"Blind Faith"	Adam Bernstein	Tom Kapinos	March 24, 2013	0.592
During a family dinner, Becca tells Hank and Karen that she is deciding on going to a literary pilgrimage. Hank meets up with Faith at her place and meets Atticus' brother there. Then later on, while they are at a bar, Faith receives a call from her mother. She reveals to Hank that she hasn't spoken to her parents in years due to their views on her lifestyle. Hank accepts Faith's invite on visiting her estranged parents in her hometown, including posing as her boyfriend. Hank and Faith later have dinner with the parents, Faith's father reveals she was a former nun, then an argument ends the dinner. Hank and Faith sneak out of the house. Hank visits Karen and both agree on letting Becca go on the literary pilgrimage.
71	11	"The Abby"	Michael Weaver	Tom Kapinos	March 31, 2013	0.580
Charlie announces to Hank and Faith that Atticus is contemplating retiring from the music business including dropping out from the musical due to wanting to spend time in rehab. Hank and Faith with the help of Becca and Bates convince Atticus not to drop out - instead to even pitch it as a form of a comeback. Ophelia reveals her feelings to Marcy which Marcy does not reciprocate. This escalates to Ophelia luring Charlie to Marcy's house and chaining both up. They realize they still love each other. Charlie and Marcy announce to Hank and Faith that they are getting re-married. Atticus invites all three on his tour, even offering to Charlie and Marcy on officiating their marriage. Hank and Karen say goodbye to Becca as she heads off to her literary pilgrimage. Karen ponders to Hank whether Becca is the reason they are still connected to each other.
72	12	"I'll Lay My Monsters Down"	Stephen Hopkins	Tom Kapinos	April 7, 2013	0.618
Hank continues to contemplate whether to start a more serious relationship with Faith or to try and win Karen back. Meanwhile, Atticus Fetch starts his tour on bus (not having enough money to pay for his airplane expenses). On the opening gig of the tour Atticus remarries Charlie and Marcy onstage, which makes Hank fantasize about asking Karen to marry him. After the show Hank gets a call from Becca, who urges him to be happy, and he embarks on the Atticus tour with Faith the next morning. While on the road Hank dreams of losing Karen in the Hell bar, and wakes up deciding to go back to her. After saying his goodbyes to Faith and Atticus, Hank gets a motorcycle lift from Krull. The episode ends with Hank having just knocked on Karen's door, uncertain of how things will turn out.

=== Season 7 (2014) ===
No. overall	No. in season	Title	Directed by	Written by	Original release date	U.S. viewers (millions)
73	1	"Levon"	David Duchovny	Tom Kapinos	April 13, 2014	0.640
The episode picks up at the end of last season, with Hank at Karen's door. He has a brief daydream that she opens the door and they live happily ever after before realizing she is not home. He tracks her to a nearby restaurant and expresses his love to her only to find that she is on a date with Chris from her yoga class. Atticus fires Hank and Charlie. The latter tells Hank that the only offer he has is from a student named Levon who wanted to interview Hank for his college paper. Unexpectedly Levon shows up at Charlie Runkle's house, where Hank is crashing. Levon spots Hank, who agrees to a quick interview before being rushed off by Charlie who has landed him an interview at Santa Monica Cop: The TV show. Hank and Karen meet briefly before Levon shows up for his rescheduled interview when he indirectly tells Hank that he is his father.
74	2	"Julia"	Adam Bernstein	Tom Kapinos	April 20, 2014	0.390
Hank starts to get frustrated with his co-workers from "Santa Monica Cop" on the first day. Charlie meets Rich Rath's new assistant, Karen, and gets quite a surprise. Hank receives his own surprise when he visits Levon's apartment.
75	3	"Like Father Like Son"	Michael Lehmann	Tom Kapinos	April 27, 2014	TBA
Hank gets an assignment to write his very first episode. Levon attempts to form a bond with Melanie (Rath's assistant) and Charlie tries to fix thing with Marcy. Karen starts to consider giving up on Hank.
76	4	"Dicks"	David Von Ancken	Tom Kapinos	May 4, 2014	0.451
Julia celebrates her new role with the help of Hank and Levon. Financial trouble contributes to the martial unrest between Charlie and Marcy, but a new client, Goldie, may put Charlie back in the black. Levon tries to have some time alone with Melanie, however the Director keeps getting in the way.
77	5	"Getting the Poison Out"	Seith Mann	Tom Kapinos	May 11, 2014	TBA
Marcy organizes a prostitute named Nikki for Levon, with whom Hank spends the night of his life. While the two have fun, Hank, Karen and Marcy have to endure the company of Nikki's creepy boyfriend. And Charlie seems to have overreached himself with his new client Goldie.
78	6	"Kickoff"	David Von Ancken	Tom Kapinos	May 18, 2014	TBA
At the start of Hank's television series "Santa Monica Cop", producer Rath invites everyone involved to a private party at his home. And while Hank approaches the female lead Amy, the male lead Hashtag Black flirts with Hank's old flame Julia. The party ends prematurely due to a bad mistake by Levon.
79	7	"Smile"	John Dahl	Tom Kapinos	May 25, 2014	TBA
“Santa Monica Cop” producer Rath demands that Hank’s manuscript be revised. Julia's boss, Dr. Dan gives her advice on how to advance her career, and Marcy's ex-husband Stu makes Marcy and Charlie an offer that makes them think twice.
80	8	"30 Minutes or Less"	David Von Ancken	Tom Kapinos	June 1, 2014	TBA
Hank has problems with Hashtag Black, the male lead of Santa Monica Cop. And fistfights don't stop there, because Stu's offer to Marcy and Charlie causes an uproar.
81	9	"Faith, Hope, Love"	John Dahl	Tom Kapinos	June 8, 2014	0.397
Hank rummages through his memories and remembering turbulent times with Karen, his puberty-confused daughter Becca and the then-happy couple Charlie and Marcy. He manages to find the right perspective with a help of a nun.
82	10	"Dinner With Friends"	Adam Bernstein	Tom Kapinos	June 15, 2014	0.411
Hank convinces Karen to have a romantic dinner together. But then the evening is first interrupted by Julia, before chaos finally breaks out with Charlie, Marcy, rock manager Krull and Levon and Marcy's ex-husband Stu attacking Charlie's masculinity.
83	11	"Daughter"	Michael Lehmann	Tom Kapinos	June 22, 2014	TBA
Because the ratings for his series “Santa Monica Cop” remain below expectations, Hank is threatened with losing his job. However, Stu can be happy, as his immoral offer is now accepted by Marcy. And while Levon ruins Karen's plans for a big family reunion, Becca has important news to share.
84	12	"Grace"	Adam Bernstein	Tom Kapinos	June 29, 2014	0.481
In the series finale, Hank makes a decision that will fundamentally change his life.
