= Hank Moody =

Fictional character

- David Duchovny as Hank Moody
- First appearance: "Pilot"
- Last appearance: "Grace"
- Created by: Tom Kapinos
- Portrayed by: David Duchovny

In-universe information
- Occupation: Writer; Professor
- Family: Al Moody (Father)
- Children: Rebecca Moody (Daughter); Levon (Son)

Henry James Moody, portrayed by David Duchovny, is a fictional character and the protagonist of the Showtime television series Californication. Moody is an esteemed but erratic writer who frequently becomes embroiled in bizarre, and in some cases, scandalous situations. Duchovny has received praise for his performance, winning the 2008 Golden Globe Award for Best Actor – Television Series Musical or Comedy and being nominated for the same honor three more times.

== Character arc ==
Hank was born in the Bronx and his parents moved to Levittown, New York on Long Island to raise him. In his pursuit to become a writer, he moved to New York City; and eventually, his talent and gift were noticed by the literary community. Hank met Karen Van der Beek at CBGB and soon after she became pregnant in 1994, later giving birth to their daughter, Becca. After the publication of his third novel, God Hates Us All, which grew his popularity, Hank, Karen and Becca moved to Los Angeles so that Hank could work on the screenplay for the movie adaptation.

After his novel God Hates Us All is adapted into a Hollywood film that he despises, A Crazy Little Thing Called Love, Hank Moody is suffering from writer's block and wallowing in alcohol, drugs and promiscuous sex. Karen is engaged to Bill Lewis, a man Hank despises. Hank meets a young woman in a bookshop reading his book and soon sleeps with her. Their brief encounter is memorably punctuated by her hitting Hank in the face with her fist. He later learns that she is Mia, Bill Lewis's sixteen-year-old daughter. Mia proceeds to provoke Hank during visits to his family at Bill's house. She uses the threat of statutory rape charges to extort un-published short stories from him that she passes off as her own work for her high-school creative-writing class. During a stay in New York for his father's funeral, Hank writes a manuscript drawing from his encounter with Mia. When the only copy falls into the hands of Mia, she slightly alters it and tries to have it published as her own, calling it Fucking & Punching. Eager to publish a young, female, sexually explicit writing sensation the publishing world shows much interest in "Mia's" book. On Karen and Bill's wedding day, Hank behaves uncharacteristically selflessly and accepts the situation so as not to destroy his beloved's wedding day. But that evening, as he and Becca are about to drive away from the reception in his un-washed, poorly maintained Porsche cabriolet, Karen runs out and jumps into his car and they drive off.

Although they planned to move back to New York, Hank and Karen split up after learning that Hank has possibly impregnated Sonja, Karen's friend that she set Hank up with while they were separated. Hank becomes fast friends with rock music producer Lew Ashby, who recruits the writer to pen his biography, which he finishes shortly after Ashby's death. After Hank has a cancer scare and Sonja gives birth to a mixed-race child, Hank and Karen reconcile. However, Hank volunteers to stay in California for Becca's sake while Karen goes to New York for work.

With Karen in New York, the status of her and Hank's relationship is unclear. After causing writer/professor Richard Bates to compromise his sobriety, Hank is recruited as a creative writing college professor in his place. During a short visit by Karen, it is decided that Hank and Becca will finally move back to New York with her. However, Mia returns to Los Angeles with her manager/boyfriend, to whom she has confessed sleeping with Hank while underage and stealing Fucking & Punching from him. When her manager suggests Mia and Hank reveal their story publicly, Hank attacks him, after which the manager calls the police. Hank returns home to confess everything to Karen, who breaks down and runs out into the street as cops arrive to arrest him.

Before Hank is even out on bail, the story behind Fucking & Punching is reported in the media. Upon being released, he is hired to rewrite the screenplay for its film adaptation. Although the assault charges are dropped, Hank is newly arrested when the district attorney decides to prosecute him for statutory rape. After an accidental overdose on alcohol and pills, Karen assumes Hank is suicidal and warms to him. But after learning he is not, she begins to date the father of Becca's new friend. Hank is found guilty, but is relieved when he only receives three years probation, a fine and community service.

Over two years later, Hank has been living in New York City while Karen is in California and married to Richard Bates, with Hank surprisingly accepting of the marriage. To get away from a break up with his year-long casual partner Carrie, who sets his apartment on fire, Hank visits California to write the script for Santa Monica Cop starring rapper Samurai Apocalypse. He also comes to blows with Becca's boyfriend Tyler, an aspiring writer who shares several characteristic traits with a young Hank Moody. After falling back into alcoholism, Richard ends his marriage to Karen and gives his blessing for her to be with Hank, with the two eager to be with one another again. However, Carrie makes a surprise visit and tricks Hank into drinking a drugged alcoholic beverage in an effort to end both their lives.

Although Hank recovers fully, Carrie is left in a persistent vegetative state with her family deciding to end her life. Hank feels responsible and falls into severe alcoholism, until his friends and daughter stage an intervention. After an early-leaving of rehab, he agrees to write the script to a rock musical adaptation of A Crazy Little Thing Called Love with rock musician Atticus Fetch writing the songs. Becca, having begun having sex and using drugs believing it will help her become a writer, much to Hank's chagrin, departs to travel the world on a "literary pilgrimage." Although he embarked on a tour with Atticus, Hank leaves hoping to finally be with Karen.

Hank is contacted by a young man, Levon, who informs him that he is Hank's son. Hank apparently impregnated his mother, Julia, just before he met Karen. While trying to connect with his son, Hank becomes one of several writers on the television adaptation of Santa Monica Cop. Becca returns with the news that she is getting married. Although he tries to dissuade the marriage, Hank ultimately gets on the plane to the ceremony in New York after reading to Karen a piece he wrote declaring he will never give up on the two of them being together.

=== Characteristics ===
However shallow Hank may come across as being, most episodes of Californication reveal at least some degree of depth to his persona, in many cases exposing a surprisingly vulnerable Hank, especially in relation to his long-term on-and-off girlfriend Karen and their daughter, Becca. He is shown on more than one occasion to be broken, empty and desolate, seeing himself as beyond saving.

Hank loves rock music and collects classic vinyl records. His favorite artist appears to be Warren Zevon. Along with the consumption of whiskey and weed, Hank listens to Zevon songs, every time he completes a piece of writing. He also mentions Black Sabbath lyrics from time to time.

He owns a classic Gibson Les Paul. In the second season, he reveals to Lew Ashby that the first album he ever bought with his own money was Led Zeppelin II. Three of Hank's novels, South of Heaven, Seasons in the Abyss and God Hates Us All are named after the albums by the American thrash metal band, Slayer.

During the first four seasons of the series, Hank is seen driving a 1990 Porsche 964 Cabriolet with one headlight smashed. The car is characterized by its messy and dusty look that Hank maintains with his daughter Becca's support. They both claim that it "has character". Hank buys a new Porsche 996 Cabriolet in the ninth episode of the first season but it's soon carjacked, so Hank goes back to his original Porsche. In the fourth season when the car is crashed by Becca, Hank subsequently buys another of the same model and color. He is seen using a tire iron to break the right headlight of the new car, even before leaving the used car lot on Washington Boulevard in Marina Del Rey, to resemble his old car. However, in Season 5 Hank is given a new Porsche (initially a 997, then a 991) by Charlie and subsequently drives that for the rest of the series. The series finale ends with a shot of the car. This solidifies that Hank is leaving his lifestyle behind to finally be with Karen, as they fly to New York for Becca's wedding.

=== Publications ===
- South of Heaven – Written before the show.
- Seasons in the Abyss – Written before the show.
- God Hates Us All – Written before the show. The movie adaptation has just been finished before the first season begins. In the sixth season Hank writes a musical based on the book with Atticus Fetch, although he is fired in the debut episode of the subsequent season.
- Fucking & Punching – Written during the first season, it was stolen by Mia Lewis, who then got it published as her own work and received critical acclaim. Hank regains attribution for the novel between the third and fourth seasons, and assists in the development of the film adaptation after being hired to rewrite the script.
- Lew Ashby, A Biography – Written during the second season. It was published posthumously after Lew Ashby mistakenly overdosed on heroin.
- Californication – Written between the fourth and fifth season.

=== Other works ===
Aside from his books, Hank has written the screenplay for the movie adaption of his God Hates Us All novel, titled A Crazy Little Thing Called Love. He also wrote the musical based on the movie before he was fired. In the first season, he writes a blog for Hell-A Magazine, which is owned by Bill Lewis. In the fourth season, he rewrote the Fucking & Punching screenplay and dialogue for Slowly We Rot 2. In season five Hank writes the screenplay for Santa Monica Cop and the lyrics to a song for singer Kali. Season seven sees Hank becoming a staff writer for the television adaptation of Santa Monica Cop.

== Development ==
David Duchovny stated that following The X-Files, he wanted to work on a comedy series, but believed casting directors and audiences would not be receptive to his being cast in such a role because of the dark tone of his previous work. He also felt that the "underdog comedies" being made at the time would not have suited him.

He was attracted to Californication because the show is a "hyper-articulate comedy" and deals with adults trying to solve their problems. Duchovny looked at his character as the emotional anchor of the show, giving "balance to all the other craziness and [keeping] it from floating away into ridiculous escapades." He revealed that creator Tom Kapinos allowed him to improvise his lines, allowing for a natural feel. Hank's iconic saying of the word "motherfucker" in a falsetto voice was one of these instances.

Duchovny said that the show's premise that a writer is interesting to people is Kapinos's fantasy; "To make a show about a writer and to have that writer be attractive to women and powerful in the world and all these things. It’s just complete wish fulfillment for Tom, and for writers in general, he would say." Marilyn Manson, who plays himself in season 6, said Kapinos told him that when creating the character of Hank Moody he wanted him to be a rock star; "He was writing about himself, so he wanted to combine a writer who behaved like a rock star."

Duchovny revealed that he wanted Hank to die at the end of the series; "Everything had to catch up with him. You can't drink and smoke like that and get away with it for too long. I wanted it to be complete. I wanted Hank to get married to Karen right before he died."

== Reception ==
David Duchovny's performance has been praised by critics. Robert Bianco of USA Today felt that he "makes the unlikeliest twists believable and the most heinous behavior forgivable." Similarly, Charlie McCollum of the San Jose Mercury News said that the actor makes a character that might seem "repugnant into a charming, engaging, surprisingly self-aware human being." Tim Goodman for SFGate claimed that Duchovny takes Kapinos's dialogue and turns it into "a kind of verbal weapon all too lacking on television." The Boston Globe's Matthew Gilbert wrote that "Duchovny manages to make Hank almost heroic at moments—a bitter cynic whose inappropriate honesty marks him as an outsider in a town that thrives on pretty lies." Reviewers for Slate, New York and Variety all praised the actor's comedy chops. However, LA Weekly's Robert Abele wrote that "Duchovny is too self-consciously cool an actor to suggest anything out of control about a guy who is having sex with that many women, which means he just seems square-ish, weak or bored when Hank pleads for Karen to reunite with him, or hugs his daughter."

Duchovny won the 2008 Golden Globe Award for Best Actor – Television Series Musical or Comedy for his performance as Hank Moody. He was nominated for the same award three more times; 2009, 2010, and 2012. In 2008 he was also nominated for the Satellite Award for Best Actor – Television Series Musical or Comedy and the Screen Actors Guild Award for Outstanding Performance by a Male Actor in a Comedy Series.
