= Hell Ain't a Bad Place to Be =

Hell Ain't a Bad Place to Be may refer to:

- "Hell Ain't a Bad Place to Be", a song from AC/DC's album Let There Be Rock
- "Hell Ain't a Bad Place to Be", the fifth season finale of Californication
