= Aerial platform =

An aerial platform may refer to:

- Aerial work platform, a mechanized access platform such as a "cherry picker" or a "scissor lift"
- Platform truck, a special type of firefighting ladder truck
