= Lift table bellows =

Safety feature

A lift table bellows (also known as lift table skirting) is a safety device that forms a protective barrier between the lift table operator and the equipment's moving parts.

The protective barrier is constructed from a wide range of material with 23oz vinyl being the most common in industrial applications.

== Purpose ==
The purpose of the lift table bellows is to keep the operator's hands and feet from getting inside of the lifter where they could be pinched.

In addition to protecting the operators, lift table skirting also protects the equipment. This protective cover can prevent the ingress of abrasive dust particles, dirt, and other common contaminants from prematurely wearing out precision machine parts. Thereby, this reduces expensive downtime and loss of vital machine accuracy and up time.

Common purposes of lift table bellows include:

- Protecting the operator from moving parts
- Protecting the equipment from debris which could prematurely wear out critical components
- Maintaining a sterile clean environment inside of the equipment
- Meeting medical standards for patient positioning tables in hospitals

== Use ==
=== Industry ===
Industries that commonly use lift tables include:

- Woodworking
- Manufacturing
- Food processing
- Automotive industry
- Aerospace industry

=== Healthcare ===
They are also used in hospitals and physician's offices.

In the United States, in some instances, the U.S. Federal Occupational Safety and Health Administration requires that bellows be installed on all moving equipment to protect nearby operators and associates. This varies from state to state and industry.
