= Kitchen appliance lift =

Tiltable shelf

A kitchen appliance lift (German: Parallelschwenkmechanik) is a tiltable shelf, particularly suitable for use with heavy or noisy kitchen appliances (such as stand mixers), so that the machine can be easily stored and run under the kitchen counter. When folded, the lift will typically fit inside a cupboard under the countertop, and when expanded the top of the shelf will usually be level with the countertop and requires the cupboard door to be left open. The lifting mechanism is often spring-assisted so that the user does not have to lift the entire weight of the kitchen appliance.

== Width ==
Internal cabinet width (for example measured in millimeters) is a factor that can impact which types of kitchen cabinets a lifter will fit in. Some lifters can be used with several widths, while others must have a specific internal cabinet width (for example 500 mm or 600 mm). Some lifters are made to fit the 32 mm cabinetmaking system. Some lifters are mounted at the bottom of cupboards, while others are mounted on their sides. It is not uncommon for mechanisms to be sold without a shelf plate.

== Load capacity ==
The maximum load of the lifter (for example measured in kilograms) should be higher than the food appliance as well as the ingredients and other things that will load the lifter (for example 15 kg or 30 kg). The mass of stand mixers varies, but generally may lie around 10 to 20 kg, and often at least 14 kg. One manufacturer offers three settings of the spring tension for the lifter to work with machines weighing 0–9 kg, 9–14 kg or 14–27 kg, respectively.

== See also ==
- Human factors and ergonomics
- Drawer slides
- Lift table
- Parallel motion linkage
- Roll-out shelf
