= Skirting =

Skirting can refer to:

- Construction elements
  - Baseboards
  - Molding (decorative)
- protective devices such as lift table bellows
- vinyl elements that covers the crawl space under a mobile home
- Skirt steaks, also known as beef skirting
- skirting, cloth used to decorate, cover, or hide tables or chairs from view, often used in exhibitions
- in sheep shearing skirting refers to cleaning the fleece from unwanted parts
