= Michael Weaver (cinematographer) =

American cinematographer and television director

- Occupations: Cinematographer, television director
- Years active: 1986–present

Michael Weaver is an American cinematographer and television director. He won a Primetime Emmy Award in the category Outstanding Cinematography for his work on the television program Californication.
