= Californication (TV series) =

American comedy-drama television series

- Genre: Comedy drama
- Created by: Tom Kapinos
- Starring: David Duchovny; Natascha McElhone; Madeleine Martin; Evan Handler; Pamela Adlon; Madeline Zima
- Opening theme: "Main Title Theme from Californication" by Tree Adams and Tyler Bates
- Composers: Tyler Bates; Tree Adams
- Country of origin: United States
- Original language: English
- No. of seasons: 7
- No. of episodes: 84 (list of episodes)

Production
- Executive producers: David Duchovny; Tom Kapinos; Stephen Hopkins (pilot only); Scott Winant (season 1); Gina Fattore (season 3)
- Producers: Lou Fusaro (seasons 1–2); Gina Fattore (season 3); John H. Radulovic (seasons 4–7)
- Production locations: California; New York (some episodes)
- Cinematography: Michael Weaver (seasons 1–6); Tim Bellen (season 7)
- Editors: Shannon Mitchell; Kevin D. Ross; Michael Ornstein; Todd Desrosiers; Tony Solomons; Mark S. Manos
- Camera setup: Single-camera
- Running time: 27–33 minutes
- Production companies: Totally Commercial Films (pilot only); Aggressive Mediocrity; Twilight Time Films (season 1); And Then...; Showtime Networks

Original release
- Network: Showtime
- Release: August 13, 2007 – June 29, 2014

Californication is an American comedy-drama television series, created by Tom Kapinos that originally aired for seven seasons and 84 episodes on Showtime from August 13, 2007, to June 29, 2014. The show follows New Yorker Hank Moody (David Duchovny), a troubled novelist who moves to California and suffers from writer's block. His drinking, womanizing, and drug abuse complicate his relationships with his longtime lover, Karen (Natascha McElhone), and their daughter, Becca (Madeleine Martin).

The show's other main characters are Hank's best friend and agent Charlie Runkle (Evan Handler) and Charlie's wife Marcy (Pamela Adlon). Recurring themes are sex, drugs, and rock and roll, all of which are featured regularly, as well as the seedier side of Los Angeles. The show won a few awards, including two Emmy Awards (nominated for two others) and one Golden Globe Award (nominated for five others).

== Series overview ==
Season	Episodes	Originally released	
Season	Episodes	First released	Last released
1	12	August 13, 2007	October 29, 2007
2	12	September 28, 2008	December 14, 2008
3	12	September 27, 2009	December 13, 2009
4	12	January 9, 2011	March 27, 2011
5	12	January 8, 2012	April 1, 2012
6	12	January 13, 2013	April 7, 2013
7	12	April 13, 2014	June 29, 2014

The series revolves around Hank Moody, a novelist plagued by alcoholism. He blames his longtime writer's block on reasons ranging from the hedonism of Los Angeles to the departure of his girlfriend Karen. Hank constantly deals with the consequences of his inability to say "no" to temptation while trying to show his family that he can be a responsible, caring father to Becca and a reliable partner to Karen.

The show was renewed for a second season on September 7, 2007. The season-one finale, "The Last Waltz" (in homage to Martin Scorsese's concert film), originally aired on Showtime on October 29, 2007. Season two began filming in April 2008, and was underway as of June 2008. The premiere episode of season two aired September 28, 2008. The first season was released on DVD in the US on June 17, 2008. Showtime renewed Californication for a third season, which premiered on Sunday September 27, 2009, at 10 pm.

The show is laced with rock culture references. It frequently alludes to Warren Zevon and featured Henry Rollins in a guest appearance; some episode titles, such as "Filthy Lucre", "Turn the Page", and "The Land of Rape and Honey", allude to album and song names (Sex Pistols' "Filthy Lucre Live", Bob Seger's "Turn the Page", and Ministry's The Land of Rape and Honey, respectively. "Turn the Page" was also covered by Metallica; episodes "...And Justice for All" and "The Unforgiven" are named after Metallica songs). Hank's lawyer in season four is called Abby Rhoads; his first three novels, South of Heaven, Seasons in the Abyss, and God Hates Us All, are all named after Slayer albums. The books Crack the Sky and Blood Mountain by Richard Bates are also the names of two Mastodon albums. A Crazy Little Thing Called Love, the movie based on God Hates Us All, is named after the song by the rock band Queen from their album The Game. The segment before the opening theme is the introduction to The Stooges' song "I Got a Right".

=== Season one ===
Season one (August 13 – October 29, 2007) followed Hank and the other main characters in the months leading up to Karen's planned marriage to Bill, a Los Angeles publisher. Hank wallows in self-loathing following the release of A Crazy Little Thing Called Love, a drastically altered and watered-down, yet commercially popular movie adaptation of his most recent novel, God Hates Us All.

Hank spends most of his time drinking and not writing. One day, he picks up a young woman in a bookstore; after they have sex, he discovers that she is Bill's 16-year-old daughter Mia. Mia proceeds to harass Hank during his visits to his family. She uses the threat of illegal sex charges to extort stories from him that she passes off as her own for her high-school creative-writing class.

The death of Hank's father drives Hank on an alcohol-fueled binge and a sexual encounter with Karen. After the funeral, Hank stays in New York to finish a manuscript for a new novella. Upon returning to LA, he believes the original copy to be lost when he is carjacked, but Mia had previously stolen the plot, and now she takes credit for it herself and attempts to have it published. On Karen and Bill's wedding day, Hank chooses to be unselfish and accept the situation so as not to destroy his beloved's wedding day, but that evening, as Becca and he leave the reception, Karen runs out and jumps into his car, presumably to resume their life together.

=== Season two ===
In season two (September 28 – December 14, 2008), Hank and Karen's relationship seems to be working out, Becca seems happy again, and their house is on the market, as they plan a move to New York. Hank gets a vasectomy, and attends a party thrown by Sonja, a woman with whom he had sex in season one. A mistake and a fight with an obnoxious police officer land Hank in jail, where he meets world-famous record producer Lew Ashby, who commissions Hank to write his biography.

Office masturbation costs Charlie Runkle his job. Circumstances lead him to go into the porn industry, as he becomes the agent/paternal figure of a porn star named Daisy, and spends the majority of the nest egg he and his wife Marcy have saved to finance the artsy porn movie Vaginatown (a take on Chinatown), starring Daisy. Marcy goes into treatment for her cocaine addiction, and Charlie starts an affair with Daisy. Hank proposes to Karen on the night they discover that Hank could be the father of Sonja's child. Karen refuses his proposal, leading him to go back to his old ways and continuing the show's central focus on clandestine sexuality.

Hank moves in with Ashby, who—to Hank's dismay—starts a romance with Mia. Becca finds a boyfriend named Damien. Mia's book is a hit and Ashby holds a party in her honor, where Damien cheats on Becca while Charlie announces he wants to leave Marcy for Daisy. After the party, Hank sees that Ashby's old girlfriend, the one who got away, has finally resurfaced. Hank then heads to Ashby's room, finding him with girls and cocaine. After Hank convinces him to rekindle the relationship, Ashby snorts some of what he believes is cocaine (but is actually heroin he had grabbed from a pile of drugs earlier in the party) and overdoses.

Hank finishes Ashby's biography. Charlie ends up working at a BMW dealership in the Valley, introducing himself as Chuck Runkle. Sonja's baby arrives; it is biracial, which proves that Hank cannot be the father. Hank and Karen slowly move toward reuniting. Karen is offered a job in New York, and Hank is happy to go there with her. When Damien apologizes to Becca, though, and they reconcile, Hank decides taking Becca out of LA would be wrong, and stays there with her while Karen starts her job in New York. The season closes with Karen's plane leaving for New York City and Hank and Becca walking on the Venice boardwalk.

=== Season three ===
Season three (September 27 – December 13, 2009) began where season two ended. Key elements include Hank becoming a creative-writing teacher, and the various shenanigans he gets into when let loose on a college campus.

The father/daughter relationship between Hank and Becca becomes decidedly moodier as she progresses through her teenage years. Hank keeps questioning his fathering ability as he watches his daughter become more like him than he ever wanted. He also continues to complicate his relationship with Becca's mother, his longtime love Karen, with various relationships with women of all ages. Hank's various relationships include a female student, his teaching assistant, and the dean's wife, all of whom fall for Hank.

In the season finale, Hank has recurring nightmares of floating in a pool, drinking heavily while talking to his most recent conquests, who are swimming naked around him; Karen and Becca watch poolside. In reality, Mia returns to Hank's home and invites the family to the media launch of the paperback edition of her book. At the after party, Hank talks to Mia's manager, who is also her new boyfriend, who says he knows of Mia's history with Hank and offers Hank a way out by coming clean to the press about how the novel came about. Since it will affect Karen and Becca, though, Hank must decline.

When they meet again, the men fight and the manager/boyfriend threatens to call the police. Hank hurries home to Karen and confesses that he slept with Mia when she was 16. Karen breaks down uncontrollably, the argument bursts onto the street, and a police car arrives as Hank is trying to calm Karen. When an officer grabs Hank from behind, Hank belts him and is bundled into the back of the car as Becca runs out to try to stop the police. The final scene shows a dream sequence of Hank in the pool again, drinking out of the bottle. He falls from his seat and drops his drink. The last shot shows Hank sinking while the bottle remains visible.

=== Season four ===
Season four (January 9, 2011 – March 27, 2011) filming began on April 19, 2010. Guest stars included Carla Gugino as Hank's lawyer Abby; Zoë Kravitz as Becca's new friend Pearl, who gets Becca to join her band, Queens of Dogtown; Addison Timlin as Sasha Bingham, a movie star; and Rob Lowe as Eddy Nero, a famous actor who wants to play Hank's character in a movie. Zakk Wylde, singer and guitarist for Black Label Society and former guitarist for Ozzy Osbourne, has a cameo as a guitar-shop employee in episode two, the title of which, "Suicide Solution", comes from the Ozzy Osbourne song. Mötley Crüe drummer Tommy Lee also has a cameo in the episode "Lights, Camera, Asshole", where he performs his solo version of Mötley Crüe's song "Home Sweet Home", on a piano at a bar at the end of the episode. Michael Ealy played a new love interest for Karen in four episodes, and Madeline Zima returned as Mia for four episodes.

The story picks up 72 hours after Hank is arrested at the end of season three, and revolves around Hank's thoroughly destroyed life. His secrets have come to light; the world knows that he penned Fucking & Punching, and that he slept with the underage Mia. Karen is disgusted and Becca is disappointed, so Hank goes to live at a hotel. Season four follows his new legal troubles, such as his lawyer's attempts to get him acquitted of statutory rape charges, plus the development of a film adaptation of "Fucking & Punching" and his sexual involvement with Sasha and Abby. Other developing storylines include Charlie learning his vasectomy may have been botched, Marcy moving in with a movie producer and learning she is pregnant by Charlie, Becca joining an all-female rock band, and Karen finding a new boyfriend.

=== Season five ===
The show returned to Showtime for its fifth season on January 8, 2012. Creator Tom Kapinos stated the show needed to take a completely new direction to stay fresh. The narrative takes place 2 years and 9 months after season four, almost at the end of Hank's probation. Hank has since made New York his home, but he returns to Los Angeles for a short, business-related visit. His family issues end up extending it. Karen is married to Professor Bates, 19-year-old Becca is in college and has a new boyfriend, and Marcy is married to Stu Beggs, sharing the custody of her son Stuart with Charlie. Hank meets with rapper-turned-actor Samurai Apocalypse (RZA), who wants Hank to write a screenplay for a movie starring Samurai. Hank originally turns down the job but eventually ends up writing Santa Monica Cop because he needs the money. Hank has a hard time working with Samurai, and their strained relationship leads to some unpleasant situations. Hank is disgusted with Hollywood after his book God Hates Us All was adapted into a movie that he hated so is not thrilled with the prospect of working on another movie.

=== Season six ===
Season 6 premiered on January 13, 2013. Its storyline revolves around Hank's relationship with Faith (played by Maggie Grace), whom he meets in a rehabilitation facility, in parallel with Hank's artistic participation in the music industry. Initially, Hank reluctantly agrees to rehab, not because of a drug dependency, but rather because of depression over his role in ex-girlfriend Carrie's suicide at the end of season five. After being dumped by him, Carrie, emotionally devastated, drugs Hank and herself, but Hank is the only one who awakes, making him lose control over his alcoholism for feeling deeply guilty. At this point, Hank's family and best friends intervene, sending him to rehab.

Faith is a famous rockstar groupie/muse who is in rehab dealing with the recent death of a rockstar with whom she was involved, ultimately becoming Hank's muse. Faith and Hank seem to be made for each other, as they take off in a bus to follow a tour of Atticus Fetch (played by Tim Minchin), a rockstar who recruits Hank to write for him during the season, but in the end, Hank is too weak to move on from Karen, and though their relationship apparently has run its course, he leaves Faith and goes back to see Karen.

=== Season seven ===
Production for the seventh season began in 2013. In December 2013, Showtime announced that Californication would end its run after the seventh season. Mary Lynn Rajskub plays a neurotic writer, whom Charlie Runkle takes on as a client. Michael Imperioli plays Rick Rath, a television producer for whom Hank begins to work.

On June 4, 2013, actress Mercedes Masohn announced that she would have a guest role as Amy Taylor Walsh, a TV star whose plea for Hank's help ends up putting him in an uncomfortable, compromising position. Amy apparently has ties to a season-four character, Sasha Bingham. Roger Howarth plays Karen's yoga teacher.

Oliver Cooper plays Levon, Hank's son from a previous relationship; Heather Graham plays Julia, Levon's mother. Comedian Jim Florentine plays a pimp, and Rob Lowe reprises his role as movie star Eddie Nero.

== Cast and characters ==
=== Main ===
Character	Actor	Seasons						
Character	Actor	1	2	3	4	5	6	7
Henry James "Hank" Moody	David Duchovny	Main	Main	Main	Main	Main	Main	Main
Karen Van Der Beek	Natascha McElhone	Main	Main	Main	Main	Main	Main	Main
Rebecca "Becca" Moody	Madeleine Martin	Main	Main	Main	Main	Main	Main	Special guest
Charlie Runkle	Evan Handler	Main	Main	Main	Main	Main	Main	Main
Mia Lewis	Madeline Zima	Main	Main	Guest	Recurring			
Marcy Runkle	Pamela Adlon	Recurring	Main	Main	Main	Main	Main	Main

- Henry James "Hank" Moody (David Duchovny) is an erratic but esteemed writer who frequently becomes embroiled in bizarre, scandalous situations. One reviewer likens Moody's character to that of writer Charles Bukowski. In the fourth season, his daughter, Becca, notes that he behaves like a "poor man's Bukowski". Similarly, in a flashback scene to the night they met, his girlfriend Karen calls him Bukowski. Charles Bukowski's main creation was the semibiographical Henry 'Hank' Chinaski, who was also an alcoholic writer struggling in LA.
- Karen Van Der Beek (Natascha McElhone) is Hank's long-term, on-and-off girlfriend and mother of his daughter. She is an interior designer and an architect.
- Rebecca "Becca" Moody (Madeleine Martin) is Hank and Karen's daughter. She is 12 years old at the start of season one. (main, seasons 1–6; special guest, season 7 [episodes 11–12])
- Charles Wolfgang "Charlie" Runkle (Evan Handler) is Hank's agent and best friend.
- Marcy Runkle (Pamela Adlon) is Charlie's wife, later ex-wife, then wife again, with whom he has a son, Stu. (recurring, season one; main, seasons two-seven)
- Mia Lewis (Mia Cross as her pen name) (Madeline Zima) is Bill Lewis' teenage daughter. In the show's pilot, Hank has a one-night stand with her, oblivious to her age and identity. Her pen name is Mia Cross (play on Cross pens). (main, seasons one-two; guest, seasons three-four)

=== Recurring ===
- Bill Lewis (Damian Young) is Karen's ex-fiancé, Mia's father, and Hank's nemesis in season one. (seasons one, four)
- Meredith (Amy Price-Francis) is a friend of Charlie and Marcy's, who is introduced to Hank in the show's pilot. Hank and she have a short relationship. (season one)
- Todd Carr (Chris Williams) is the director of A Crazy Little Thing Called Love, the movie adaptation of Hank's novel God Hates Us All. (seasons one, four)
- Sonja (Paula Marshall) is a friend of Karen's. She has a brief affair with Hank. (seasons one-two)
- Michelle (Surfer Girl) (Michelle Lombardo) is Hank's friend, and on at least two occasions, lover. (seasons one-two)
- Beatrice (Trixie) (Judy Greer) is Hank's prostitute friend. (seasons one-two, four-five)
- Dani (Rachel Miner) is an ambitious agent who was formerly Charlie's assistant. They had a brief affair. (seasons one-two)
- Lew Ashby (Callum Keith Rennie) is a record producer who comes to Hank with a book deal, to write his biography. The character is believed to be based on the real-life producer Rick Rubin, and the scenes in Ashby's house were actually filmed in Rubin's house. (main; season two, recurring; seasons five-six)
- Janie Jones (Mädchen Amick) is Lew Ashby's long-lost love. (season two)
- Daisy (Carla Gallo) is a porn star, Charlie's client, and later his extramarital lover. (seasons two-three)
- Ronny Praeger (Hal Ozsan) is a porn director and Charlie's business partner in the Vaginatown project. (season two)
- Julian (Angus MacFadyen) is Hank's season-two nemesis, and Sonja's husband and spiritual guru. He is the author of The Artist Within. (season two)
- Damien Patterson (Ezra Miller) is Becca's boyfriend, son of her English teacher, Mrs. Patterson (season two).
- Mrs. Patterson (Justine Bateman) is Damien's mother and Becca's English teacher. Hank and she engage in a brief affair. (season two)
- Stacey Koons (Peter Gallagher) is the dean of the college where Hank teaches. Hank once teasingly called him Dean Koontz. (season three)
- Felicia Koons (Embeth Davidtz) is married to Dean Koons and a teacher at the college. Hank and she engage in a brief affair. (season three)
- Chelsea Koons (Ellen Woglom) is Becca's best friend and the daughter of Hank's bosses, Felicia and Stacey Koons. (season three)
- Richard Bates (Jason Beghe) is Karen's old professor and later husband in season five. Bates had published Blood Mountain, to which Stu Beggs bought the rights to turn into a movie. (seasons three, five-six)
- Jill Robinson (Diane Farr) is Hank's teaching assistant. They engage in a brief affair. (season three)
- Jackie (Eva Amurri) is Hank's student, who moonlights as a stripper. They engage in a brief affair. (season three)
- Sue Collini (Kathleen Turner) is Charlie's boss and occasional sex partner. (season three)
- Abby Rhodes (Carla Gugino) is Hank's lawyer. Besides business, Hank and she have a short relationship. (season four)
- Stu Beggs (Stephen Tobolowsky) is a movie producer and Marcy's boyfriend and later husband. (seasons four-seven)
- Sasha Bingham (Addison Timlin) is an actress scheduled to portray Mia in Hank's upcoming movie. Hank and she engage in a brief affair. (season four)
- Eddie Nero (Rob Lowe) is an actor set to portray Hank in his upcoming movie. (seasons four-seven)
- Pearl (Zoë Kravitz) is the vocalist for the Queens of Dogtown, the band in which Becca plays guitar. (season four)
- Ben (Michael Ealy) is Pearl's father and Karen's love interest. (season four)
- Peggy (Melissa Stephens) is Charlie's realtor and occasional sex partner. (season four)
- Carrie (Natalie Zea) is Hank's girlfriend in New York. (seasons five-six)
- Kali (Meagan Good) is a singer and Samurai Apocalypse's former lover. Hank and she meet on a plane flight to LA and immediately hit it off. Later, they engage in a brief affair. (season five)
- Samurai Apocalypse (RZA) is a rapper-turned-actor, and a business associate of Hank's. (season five)
- Tyler (Scott Michael Foster) is Becca's boyfriend, disliked by both Hank and Richard. (season five)
- Lizzie (Camilla Luddington) is the nanny of Marcy and Charlie's son, and later becomes Charlie's occasional sex partner. (season five)
- Atticus Fetch (Tim Minchin) is a rockstar writing a musical with Hank. His name is a play on Atticus Finch from To Kill a Mockingbird. (season six)
- Faith (Maggie Grace) is a famous rockstar groupie, who makes an emotional connection with Hank. (season six)
- Ophelia Robins (Maggie Wheeler) is Marcy's man-hating spiritual guide. (season six)
- Krull (Steve Jones) is Atticus Fetch's bodyguard. (seasons six-seven)
- Trudy (Alanna Ubach) is the widow of Atticus Fetch's former guitarist, with whom Faith was involved until his death and prior to meeting Hank. Hank and Charlie both engage in brief affairs with her. (season six)
- Levon (Oliver Cooper) is Hank's alleged son from a previous relationship. (season seven)
- Rick Rath (Michael Imperioli) is an old-school TV producer and former writer. (season seven)
- Julia (Heather Graham) is Hank's ex-girlfriend and Levon's mother. (season seven)
- Goldie (Mary Lynn Rajskub) is Hank's co-worker and Charlie's new client. (season seven)

=== Guest stars ===
- Amber Heard plays herself, an actress on the set of A Crazy Little Thing Called Love. (S01)
- Pete Wentz has a cameo as a guest at Mia's party. (S02)
- Henry Rollins has a cameo as a radio personality who interviews Hank. (S01)
- Rick Springfield plays a depraved version of himself. (S03)
- Peter Fonda plays himself as Sue Collini's first client. (S03)
- Zakk Wylde has a cameo as a Guitar Center employee. (S04)
- Fisher Stevens is Zig Semetauer, a potential investor for the movie adaption of "Fucking & Punching". (S04)
- Tommy Lee has a short cameo as himself. (S04)
- Peter Berg plays himself in one scene, where he ends up fighting with Hank. (S05)
- Drea de Matteo plays a stripper who has sex with Richard, Karen's then-husband. (S05)
- Sebastian Bach has a cameo as the dead rockstar. (S06)
- Marilyn Manson plays himself, a friend of Atticus Fetch's. (S06)
- Artie Lange plays himself, an AA member. (S06)
- Alonzo Bodden plays Alonzo, a comedian. (S07)

== Reception ==
=== Critical response ===
The critical reaction for the first season of Californication was generally favorable, with a weighted average score on Metacritic of 72 out of 100 based on 23 reviews, indicating "generally favorable reviews". American critic Nathan Rabin, though, gave the season an "F" rating on The A.V. Club, calling it "insufferable".

=== Ratings ===
The season finale of the show's second season, on December 14, 2008, drew 615,000 viewers, with a combined total of 937,000 for the evening, retaining less than 50% of its lead-in from the season-three finale of Dexter. Season three steadily gained viewership, and the show was quickly picked up for a fourth season by Showtime.

=== Awards and nominations ===
The show and the lead actor, David Duchovny, were both nominated for Golden Globes in 2007; Duchovny won the lead actor award, but the award for best TV series in this category went to Extras.

American Cinema Editors (ACE)

- 2007: Best Edited Half-Hour Television Series (for "Hell-A Woman", nominated)

BAFTA TV Awards

- 2007: Best International Programme (nominated)

Casting Society of America

- 2007: Outstanding Casting — Television Pilot: Comedy (nominated)
- 2008: Outstanding Casting — Television Series — Comedy (nominated)

Emmy Awards

- 2008: Outstanding Casting for a Comedy Series (nominated)
- 2008: Outstanding Cinematography for a Half-Hour Series (Peter Levy, for "Pilot", won)
- 2009: Outstanding Casting for a Comedy Series (nominated)
- 2009: Outstanding Cinematography for a Half-Hour Series (Michael Weaver, for "In Utero", won)

Golden Globe Awards

- 2008: Best Actor – Musical or Comedy Series (Duchovny as Hank Moody, won)
- 2007: Best Series – Musical or Comedy (nominated)
- 2009: Best Actor – Musical or Comedy Series (Duchovny as Hank Moody, nominated)
- 2008: Best Series – Musical or Comedy (nominated)
- 2010: Best Actor – Musical or Comedy Series (Duchovny as Hank Moody, nominated)
- 2012: Best Actor – Musical or Comedy Series (Duchovny as Hank Moody, nominated)

PGA Awards

- 2010: Producer of the Year Award in Episodic Television — Comedy (Kapinos, Duchovny, Fattore, Dyer, Fusaro nominated)

Prism Awards

- 2009: Comedy Episode (for "The Raw & the Cooked", nominated)

Satellite Awards

- 2008: Best Actor – Musical or Comedy Series (David Duchovny as Hank Moody, nominated)

Screen Actors Guild Awards

- 2008: Outstanding Performance by a Male Actor in a Comedy Series (Duchovny as Hank Moody, nominated)

Telekamery Tele Tygodnia

- 2010: Nomination for Best Foreign Television Series

== Lawsuit ==
The Red Hot Chili Peppers filed a lawsuit on November 19, 2007, against Showtime Networks over the name of the series, which is also the name of the band's 1999 album and hit single. They state in the lawsuit that the series "constitutes a false designation of origin, and has caused and continues to cause a likelihood of confusion, mistake, and deception as to source, sponsorship, affiliation, and/or connection in the minds of the public".

Pointing to Dani California, a character who appears in both the series and three songs by the Red Hot Chili Peppers (including "Californication"), as well as confusion when shopping for their album and that of the series soundtrack, the lawsuit asks for unspecified damages, and requests that a new name be found for the show.

Showtime Networks argued that the band did not in fact create the term Californication. They point out that the term appeared in print in Time magazine in 1972, in an article called The Great Wild Californicated West, while show producer Tom Kapinos cites the inspiration as coming from a bumper sticker he saw in the '70s that read Don't Californicate Oregon. Canadian art-rock band the Rheostatics released an album called Whale Music in 1992, with a song called "California Dreamline". In this song, the word Californication appears in the phrase "Californication, spooning in the dry sand".

Kim Walker, head of intellectual property at Pinsent Masons, states that the band should have registered Californication as a trademark. Instead, the only application for such was filed in April 2007 in the US, by Showtime. The mark has not yet been registered. Walker has also stated:

Successful songs, albums and movies can become brands in themselves. What's really surprising is how few songs and albums are properly protected... The Chili Peppers could almost certainly have registered a trademark for 'Californication', notwithstanding Time's article. They made the word famous, but it doesn't automatically follow that they can stop its use in a TV show.

If they had registered the title as a trademark covering entertainment services, I very much doubt we'd have seen a lawsuit. The TV show would have been called something else. As it is, the band faces an uphill struggle.

In the United States, character names and titles of works are only subject to trademark protection, not copyright protection.

According to an article on Hollywood news site TheWrap in 2011, the lawsuit was settled out of court.
