= Aerial work platform =

Mechanical device for lifting people to high places

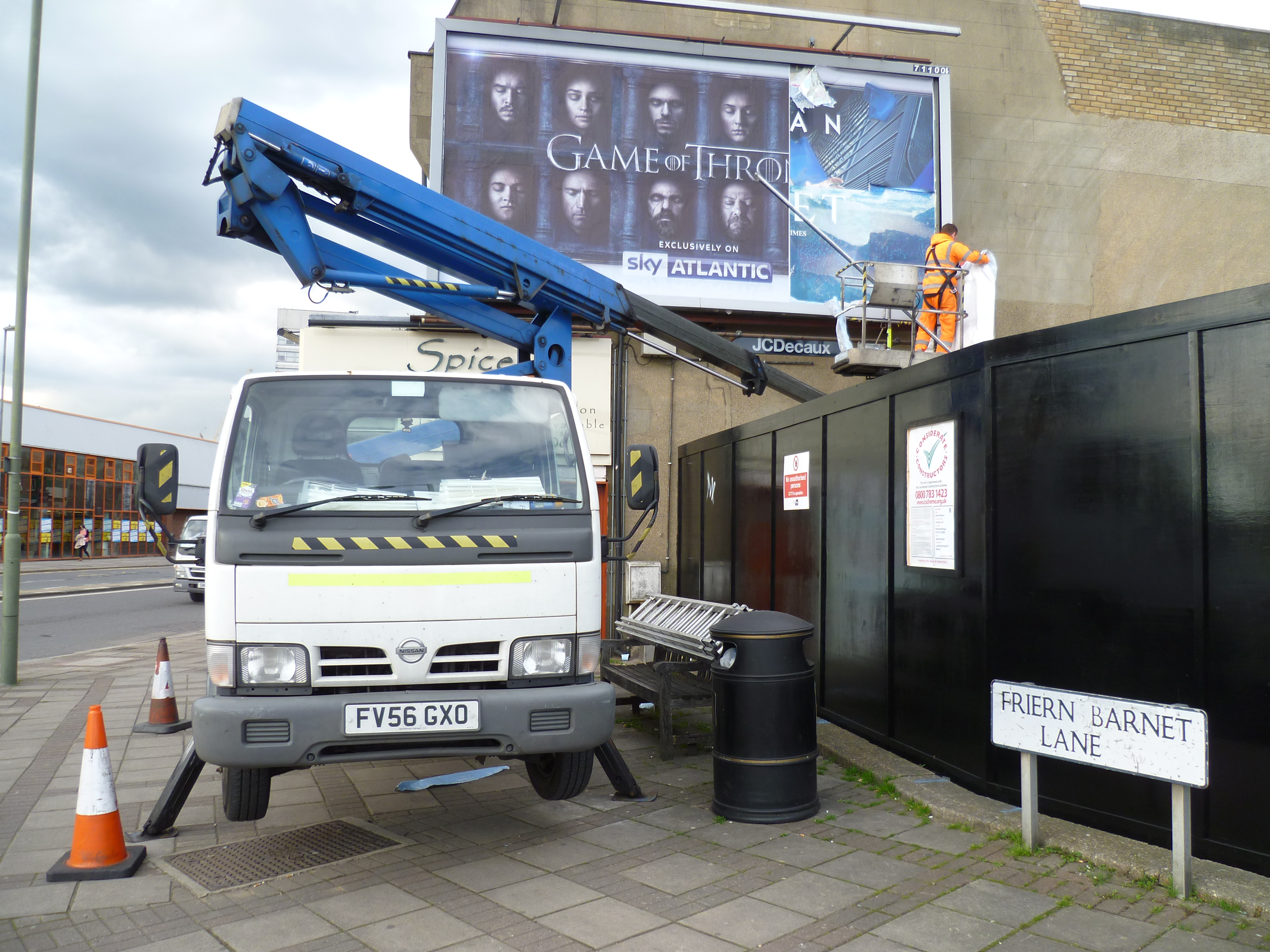
Replacing an advertising poster in London using an aerial work platform.

An aerial work platform (AWP), also an aerial device, aerial lift, boom lift, bucket truck, cherry picker, elevating work platform (EWP), mobile elevating work platform (MEWP), or scissor lift, is a mechanical device used to provide temporary access for people or equipment to inaccessible areas, usually at height. There are various distinct types of mechanized access platforms.

They are generally used for temporary, flexible access purposes such as maintenance and construction work or by firefighters for emergency access, which distinguishes them from permanent access equipment such as elevators. They are designed to lift limited weight-usually less than a ton, although some have a higher safe working load (SWL) [1]—distinguishing them from most types of cranes. They are usually capable of being set up and operated by a single person

Regardless of the task they are used for, aerial work platforms may provide additional features beyond transport and access, including being equipped with electrical outlets or compressed air connectors for power tools. They may also be equipped with specialist equipment, such as carrying frames for window glass. Underbridge units are also available to lift operators down to a work area.

As the name suggests, cherry pickers were initially developed to facilitate the picking of cherries. Jay Eitel invented the device in 1944 after a frustrating day spent picking cherries using a ladder. He went on to launch the Telsta Corporation, Sunnyvale, California in 1953 to manufacture the device. Another early cherry picker manufacturer was Stemm Brothers, Leavenworth, WA. Other uses for cherry pickers quickly evolved.

== Lifting mechanisms ==
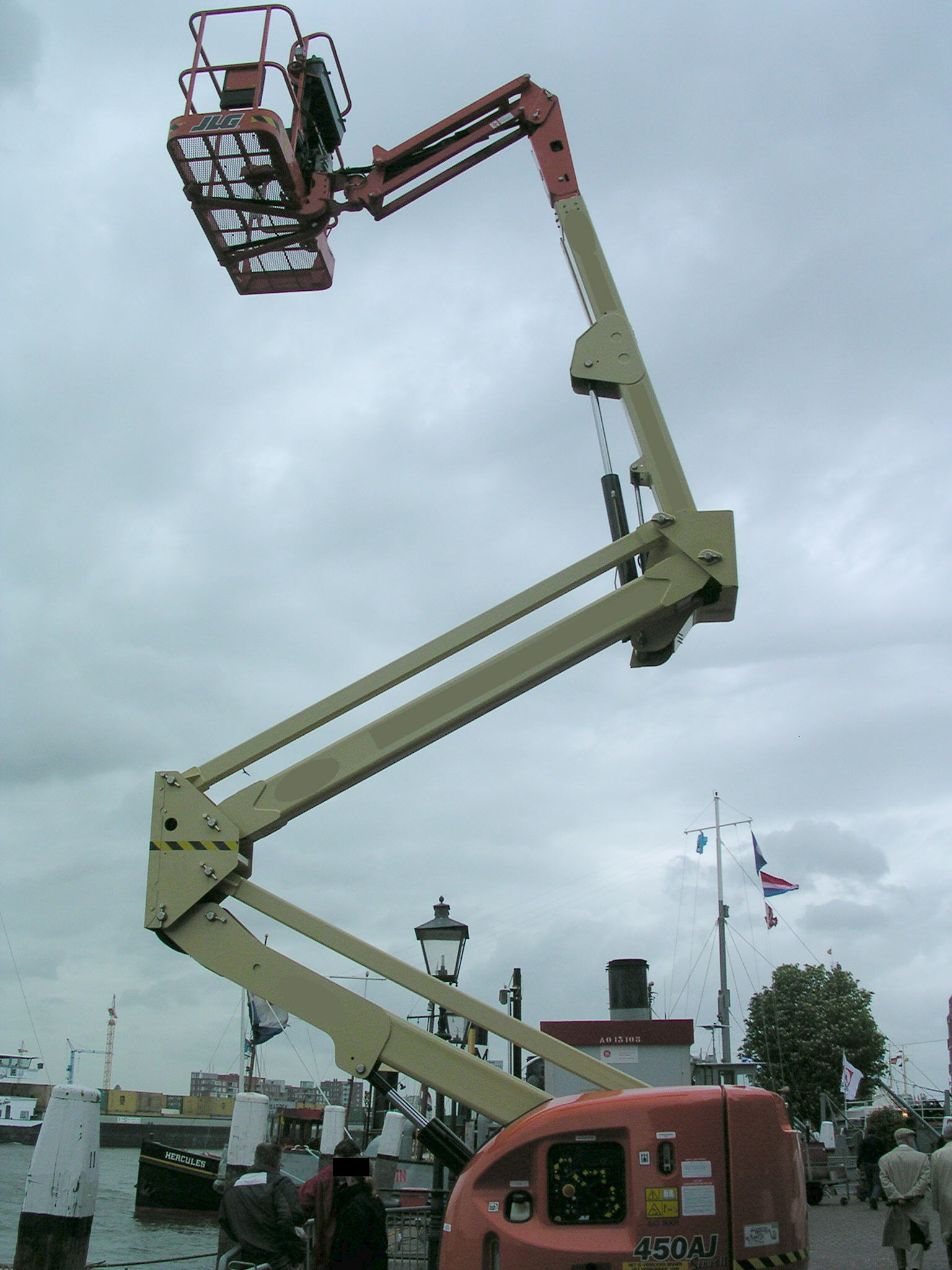
Articulated lift being demonstrated

There are several distinct types of aerial work platforms, which all have specific features which make them more or less desirable for different applications. The key difference is in the drive mechanism which propels the working platform to the desired location. Most are powered by either hydraulics or possibly pneumatics. The different techniques also reflect in the pricing and availability of each type.

=== Aerial device ===
Aerial devices were once exclusively operated by hydraulic pistons, powered by diesel or gasoline motors on the base unit. Lightweight electrically powered units are gaining popularity for window-cleaning or other maintenance operations, especially indoors and in isolated courtyards, where heavier hydraulic equipment cannot be used. Aerial devices are the closest in appearance to a crane – consisting of a number of jointed sections, which can be controlled to extend the lift in a number of different directions, which can often include "up and over" applications.

==== Articulated ====
The most common type of aerial device is known in the AWP industry as knuckle boom lifts or articulated boom lifts, due to their distinctive shape, providing easy access to awkward high reach positions.

This type of AWP is the most likely of the types to be known as a "cherry picker", owing to its origins, where it was designed for use in orchards (though not just cherry orchards). It lets the picker standing in the transport basket pick fruit high in a tree with relative ease (with the jointed design ensuring minimum damage to the tree). The term "cherry picker" has become generic, and is commonly used to describe articulated lifts (and more rarely all AWPs).

==== Straight telescopic boom ====
Another type of aerial device is a straight boom lift or telescopic boom lift, which as its name suggests has a boom that extends straight out for direct diagonal or vertical reach by the use of telescoping sections, allowing the operator to take full advantage of the boom length range.

==== Spider legs ====
Some AWPS are classified as spider lifts due to the appearance of their legs as they unfold, extend and stabilise, providing a wide supportive base to operate safely. These legs can be manual or hydraulic (usually depending on size and price of the machine).

==== Domains of use ====
AWPs are widely used for maintenance and construction of all types, including extensively in the power and telecommunications industries to service overhead lines, and in arboriculture to provide an independent work platform on difficult or dangerous trees. A specialist type of the articulated lift is the type of fire apparatus used by firefighters worldwide as a vehicle to provide high level or difficult access. These types of platforms often have additional features such as a piped water supply and water cannon to aid firefighters in their task.

=== Scissor lift ===
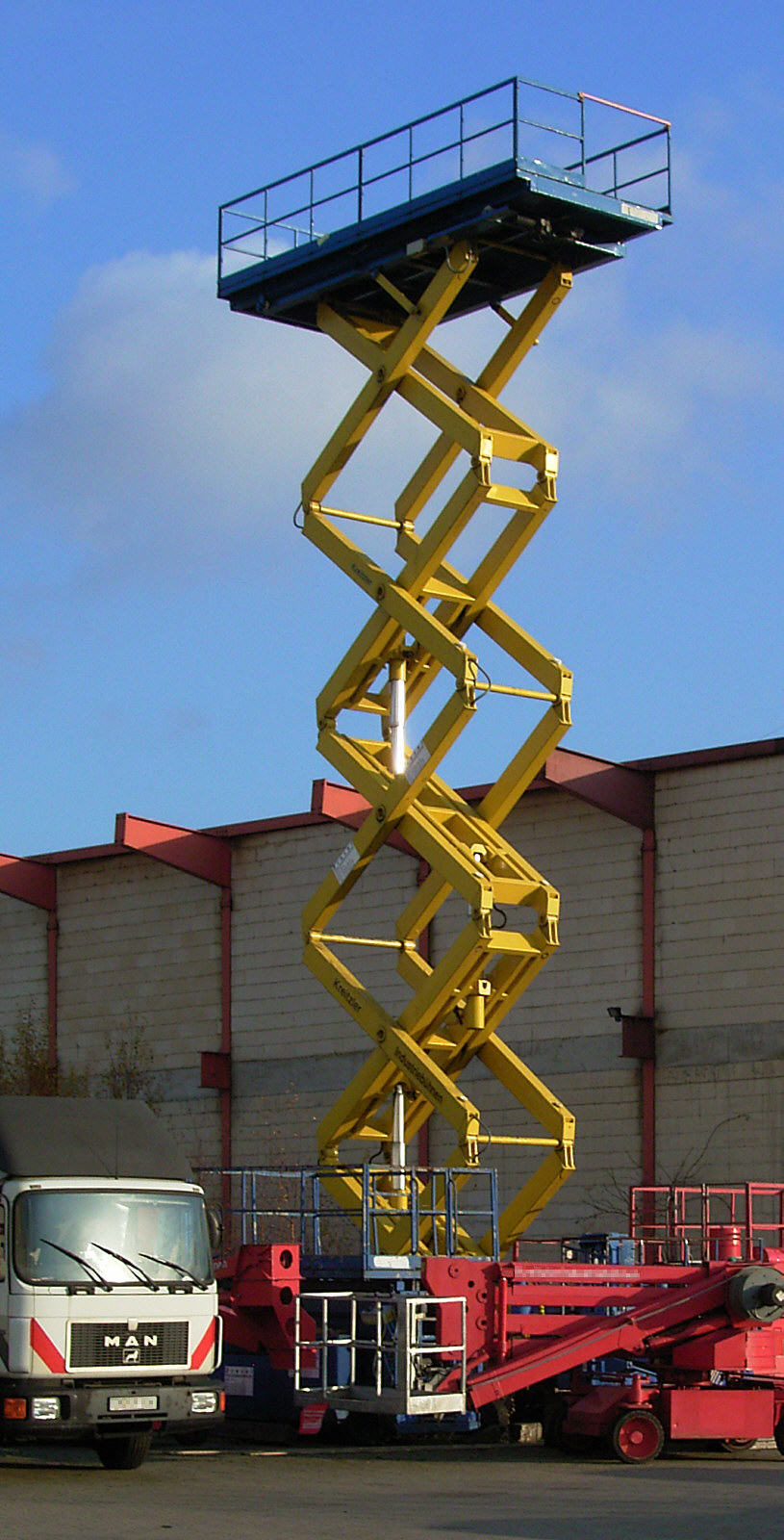
An extended scissor lift

A scissor lift is a type of platform that can usually only move vertically. The mechanism to achieve this is the use of linked, folding supports in a criss-cross X pattern, known as a pantograph (or scissor mechanism). The upward motion is achieved by the application of pressure to the outside of the lowest set of supports, elongating the crossing pattern, and propelling the work platform vertically. The platform may also have an extending deck to allow closer access to the work area, because of the inherent limits of vertical-only movement.

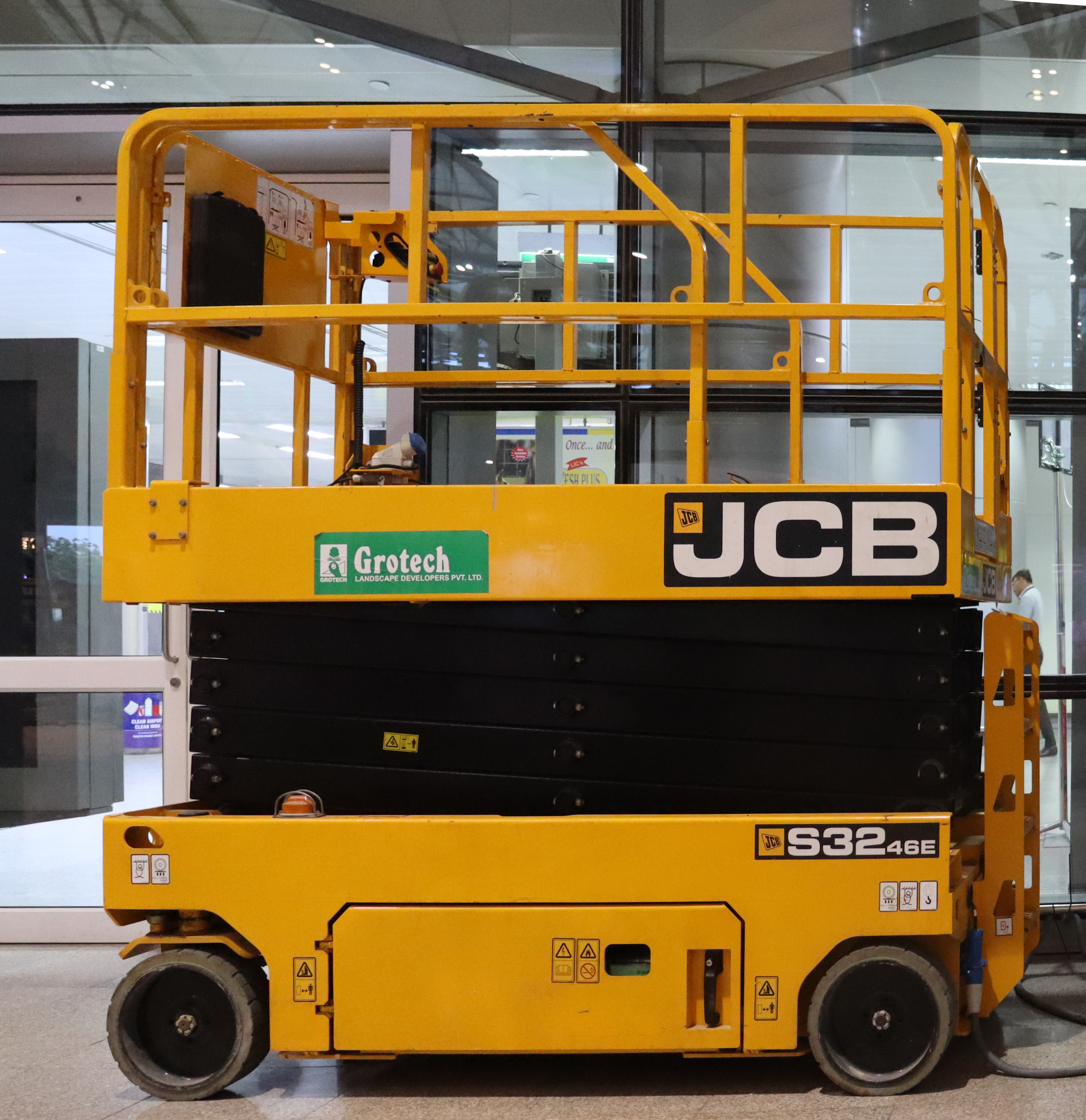
JCB S1930E Scissor Lift at Rajiv Gandhi International Airport, Hyderabad

The contraction of the scissor action can be hydraulic, pneumatic or mechanical (via a leadscrew or rack and pinion system). Depending on the power system employed on the lift, it may require no power to descend, able to do so with a simple release of hydraulic or pneumatic pressure. This is the main reason that these methods of powering the lifts are preferred, as it allows a fail-safe option of returning the platform to the ground by release of a manual valve.

Apart from the height and width variables, there are a few considerations required when choosing a scissor lift. Electric scissor lifts have smaller tyres and can be charged by a standard power point. These machines usually suit level ground surfaces and have zero or minimal fuel emissions. Diesel scissor lifts have larger rough terrain tyres with high ground clearance for uneven outdoor surface conditions. Many machines contain outriggers that can be deployed to stabilise the machine for operation.

=== Mast lift (also pillar lift, vertical personnel lift) ===
A mast lift, also known as a pillar lift or vertical personnel lift, uses a vertical mast to raise a single-person platform. Working heights typically range from 3.5 metres to 6 metres in indoor models. The mast extends through telescoping aluminium sections driven by either a chain-driven mechanism, screw thread, or rack and pinion.

Mast lifts are classified as Type 1 / Group A under EN 280, the European safety standard for mobile elevating work platforms: the platform is stationary while elevated and the unit is movable only at low platform height. They are typically dimensioned to pass through standard 800 mm interior doorways and to fit inside goods elevators, distinguishing them from larger scissor lifts and boom lifts which are excluded from many indoor environments by their footprint.

Common applications include indoor lighting installation and service, signage installation, ceiling cleaning, sprinkler head inspection, ventilation access, and stockpicking in retail and warehouse environments. The single-operator guarded platform with a harness anchor distinguishes mast lifts from stepladders for tasks above two metres, where the European Work at Height Directive and member-state workplace safety authorities recommend MEWP equipment over ladders for routine indoor work.

== Motive mechanisms ==
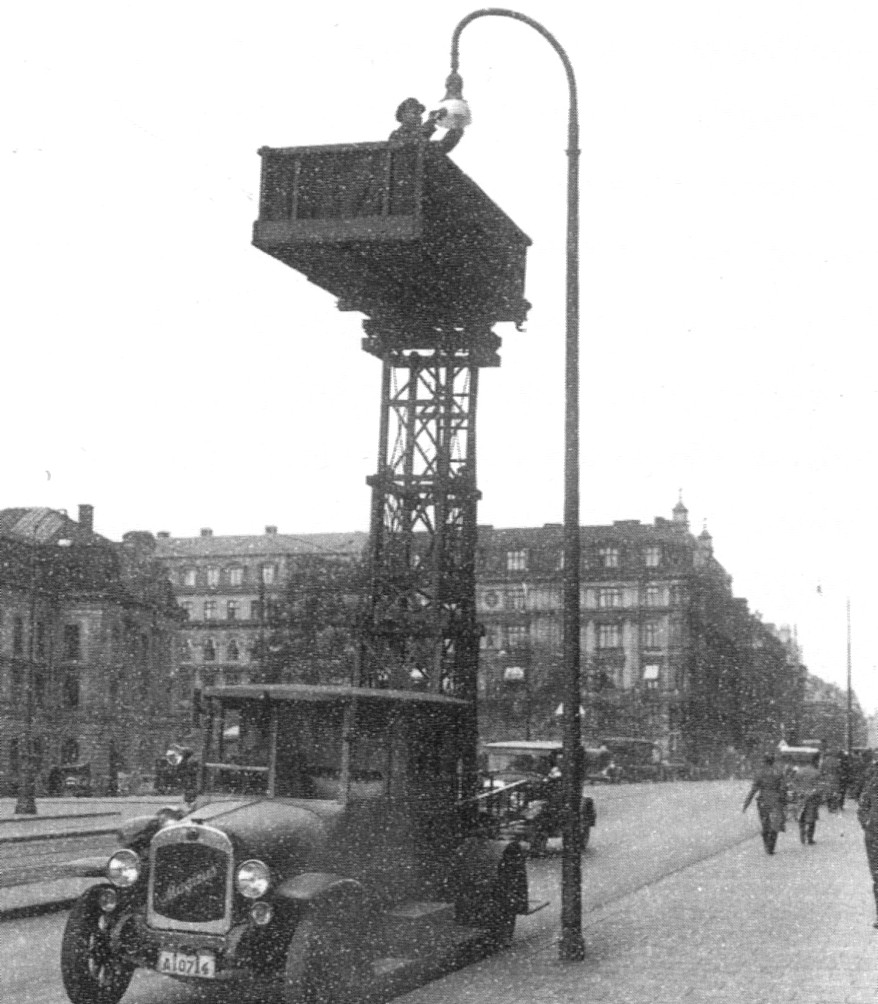
A 1920s version in Sweden, for work on public street lights.

AWPs, by their nature, are designed for temporary works and therefore frequently require transportation between sites, or simply around a single site (often as part of the same job). For this reason, they are almost all designed for easy movement and the ability to ride up and down truck ramps.

=== Unpowered ===
These usually smaller units have no motive drive and require external force to move them. Dependent on size and whether they are wheeled or otherwise supported, this may be possible by hand, or may require a vehicle for towing or transport. Small non-powered AWPs can be light enough to be transported in a pickup truck bed, and can usually be moved through a standard doorway.

=== Self-propelled ===
These units are able to drive themselves (on wheels or tracks) around a site (they usually require to be transported to a site, for reasons of safety and economy). In some instances, these units will be able to move whilst the job is in progress, although this is not possible on units which require secure outriggers, and therefore most common on the scissor lift types. The power can be almost any form of standard mechanical drive system, including electric or gasoline powered, or in some cases, a hybrid (especially where it may be used both inside and outside).

Such person lifts are distinguished from telescopic handlers in that the latter are true cranes designed to deliver cargo loads such as pallets full of construction materials (rather than just a person with some tools).

=== Vehicle-mounted ===
Some units are mounted on a vehicle, usually a truck. They can also be mounted on a flat-back pick-up van known as a self drive, though other vehicles are possible, such as flatcars. This vehicle provides mobility, and may also help stabilize the unit – though outrigger stabilizers are still typical, especially as vehicle-mounted AWPs are amongst the largest of their kind. The vehicle may also increase functionality by serving as a mobile workshop or store.

== Control ==
(video) Three aerial work platform trucks work together on utility poles, in Bunkyo, Japan.

The power assisted drive (if fitted) and lift functions of an AWP are controlled by an operator, who can be situated either on the work platform itself, or at a control panel at the base of the unit. Some models are fitted with a panel at both locations or with a remote control, giving operator a choice of position. A control panel at the base can also function as a safety feature if for any reason the operator is at height and becomes unable to operate the controls. Even models not fitted with a control panel at the base are usually fitted with an emergency switch of some sort, which allows manual lowering of the lift (usually by the release of hydraulic or pneumatic pressure) in the event of an emergency or power failure.

Controls vary by model, but are frequently either buttons or a joystick. The type and complexity of these will depend on the functions the platform is able to perform, such as:

- Vertical movement
- Lateral movement
- Rotational movement (cardinal direction)
- Platform / basket movement — normally, the system automatically levels the platform, regardless of boom position, but some allow overrides, tilting up to 90° for work in difficult locations.
- Ground movement (in self-propelled models)

== Safety ==
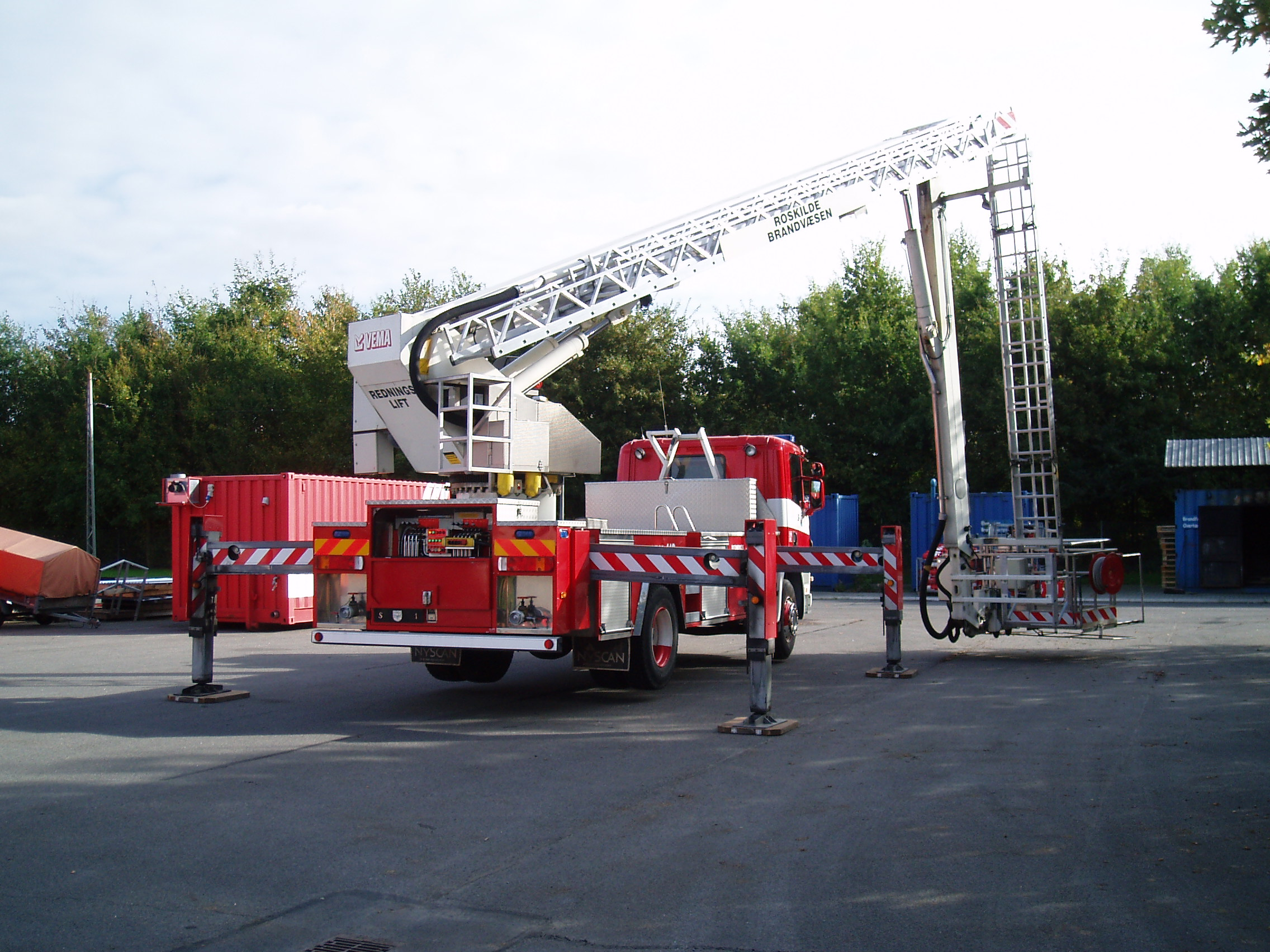
Telescoping articulated platform mounted on firefighting appliance in Denmark. These provide more flexibility than ladder engines.

The majority of manufacturers and operators have strict safety criteria for the operation of AWPs. In some countries, a licence and insurance is required to operate some types of AWP. Most protocols advocate training every operator, whether mandated or not. Most operators adopt a checklist of verifications to be completed before each use. Manufacturers recommend regular maintenance schedules.

In Europe, the safety criteria for mobile elevating work platforms are codified in the EN 280 standard, which specifies design, calculation, examination, and testing requirements for MEWPs of all working heights. Since 2022 it is published as EN 280-1:2022, with EN 280-2:2022 adding requirements for load lifting appliances on the extending structure and work platform; the two replaced EN 280:2013+A1:2015. EN 280 mandates the harness anchor point, emergency stop, and emergency lowering valve described above as standard features on certified equipment. The standard classifies platforms by travelling type (Type 1: travelling only in the transport position; Type 2 and 3: travelling with the platform raised, controlled from the chassis or from the platform) and into two groups (Group A: the centre of the platform always stays inside the tipping lines; Group B: all other MEWPs).

Work platforms are fitted with safety or guard rails around the platform itself to contain operators and passengers. This is supplemented in most models by a restraining point, designed to secure a safety harness or fall arrester. Some work platforms also have a lip around the floor of the platform itself to avoid tools or supplies being accidentally kicked off the platform. Some protocols require all equipment to be attached to the structure by individual lanyards.

When using AWPs in the vicinity of overhead power lines, users may be electrocuted if the lift comes into contact with electrical wiring. Non-conductive materials, such as fiberglass, may be used to reduce this hazard. 'No Go Zones' may be designated near electrical hazards to ensure the safety of the user.

AWPs often come equipped with a variety of tilt sensors. The most commonly activated sensor is an overweight sensor that will not allow the platform to raise if the maximum operating weight is exceeded. Sensors within the machine detect that weight on the platform is off-balance to such a point as to risk a possible tip-over if the platform is raised further. Another sensor will refuse to extend the platform if the machine is on a significant incline. Some models of AWPs additionally feature counterweights, which extend in order to offset the danger of tipping the machine inherent in extending items like booms or bridges.

As with most dangerous mechanical devices, all AWPs are fitted with an emergency stop button which may be activated by a user in the event of a malfunction or danger. Best practice dictates fitting of emergency stop buttons on the platform and at the base as a minimum. Other safety features include automatic self-checking of the AWP's working parts, including a voltmeter that detects if the lift has insufficient power to complete its tasks and preventing operation if supply voltage is insufficient. Some AWPs provide manual lowering levers at the base of the machine, allowing operators to lower the platform to the ground in the event of a power or control failure, or unauthorized use of the machine.

== Rental equipment ==
AWPs are often bought by equipment rental companies, who then rent them out to construction companies or individuals needing these specialized machines. The market for these machines is known to be marked by especially strong boom and bust cycles, and after a great demand in the 1990s, the market crashed in 2001, leading to a strong contraction amongst the manufacturers. The industry began a strong growth period again in 2003 that resulted in peak shipments in 2007, prior to the 2008 financial crisis, which led to consolidation amongst rental companies. The industry reached high unit shipment levels again in 2018.

== See also ==
- Early aerials
- Forklift truck
- Helix tower
- Lift table
- Long reach excavator
