= Lift table =

Surface for raising and lowering a load

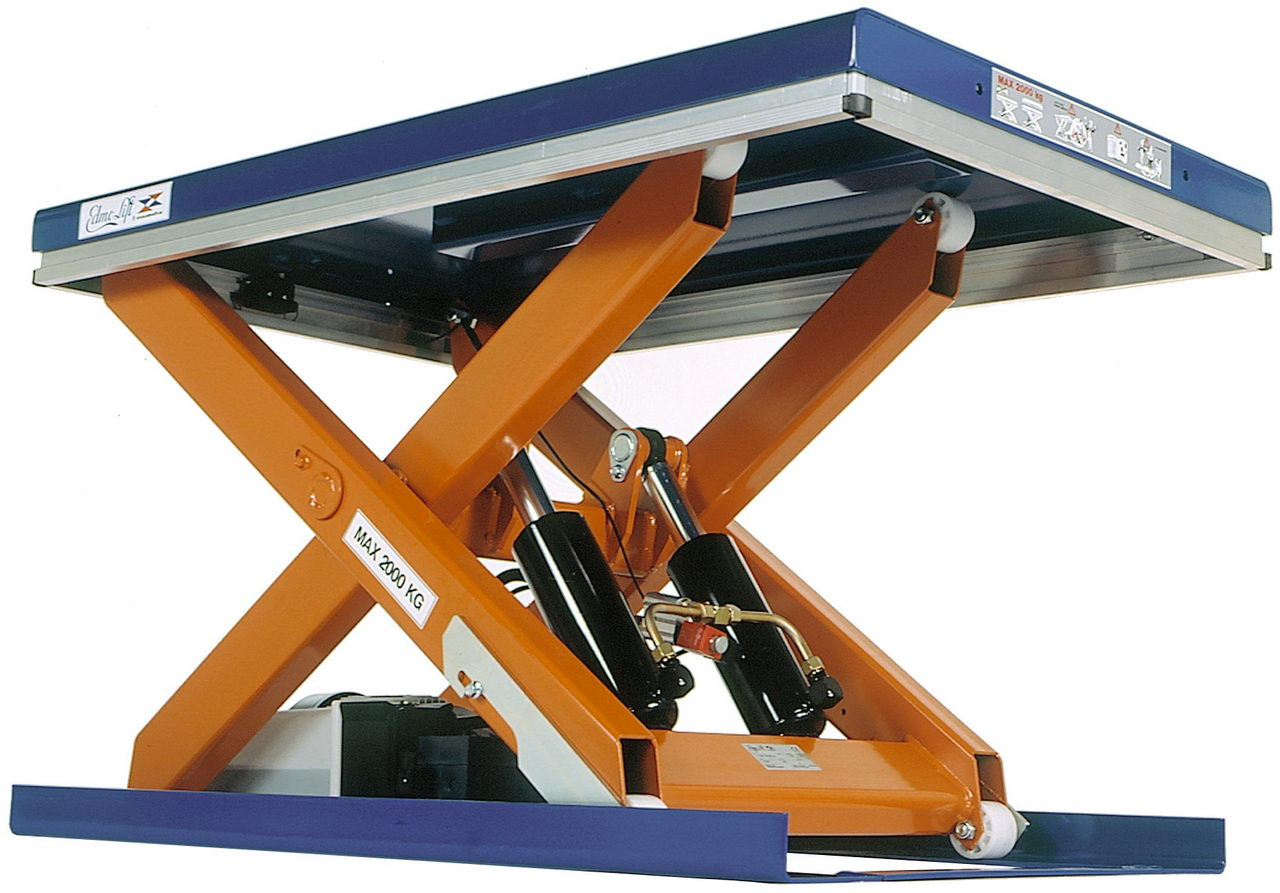
A scissor lift.

A lift table is a device that employs a scissors mechanism to raise or lower goods and/or persons. Typically lift tables are used to raise large, heavy loads through relatively small distances. Common applications include pallet handling, vehicle loading and work positioning, as well as facilitating assembly operations, maintenance tasks, and product inspection. Lift tables are a recommended way to help reduce incidents of musculoskeletal disorders by correctly re-positioning work at a suitable height for operators. Lift tables lend themselves to being easily adapted to a specific use. They can work in hostile environments, be manufactured in stainless steel and have equipment like conveyors, turn-tables, barriers and gates easily added to their deckplates.

== Use ==
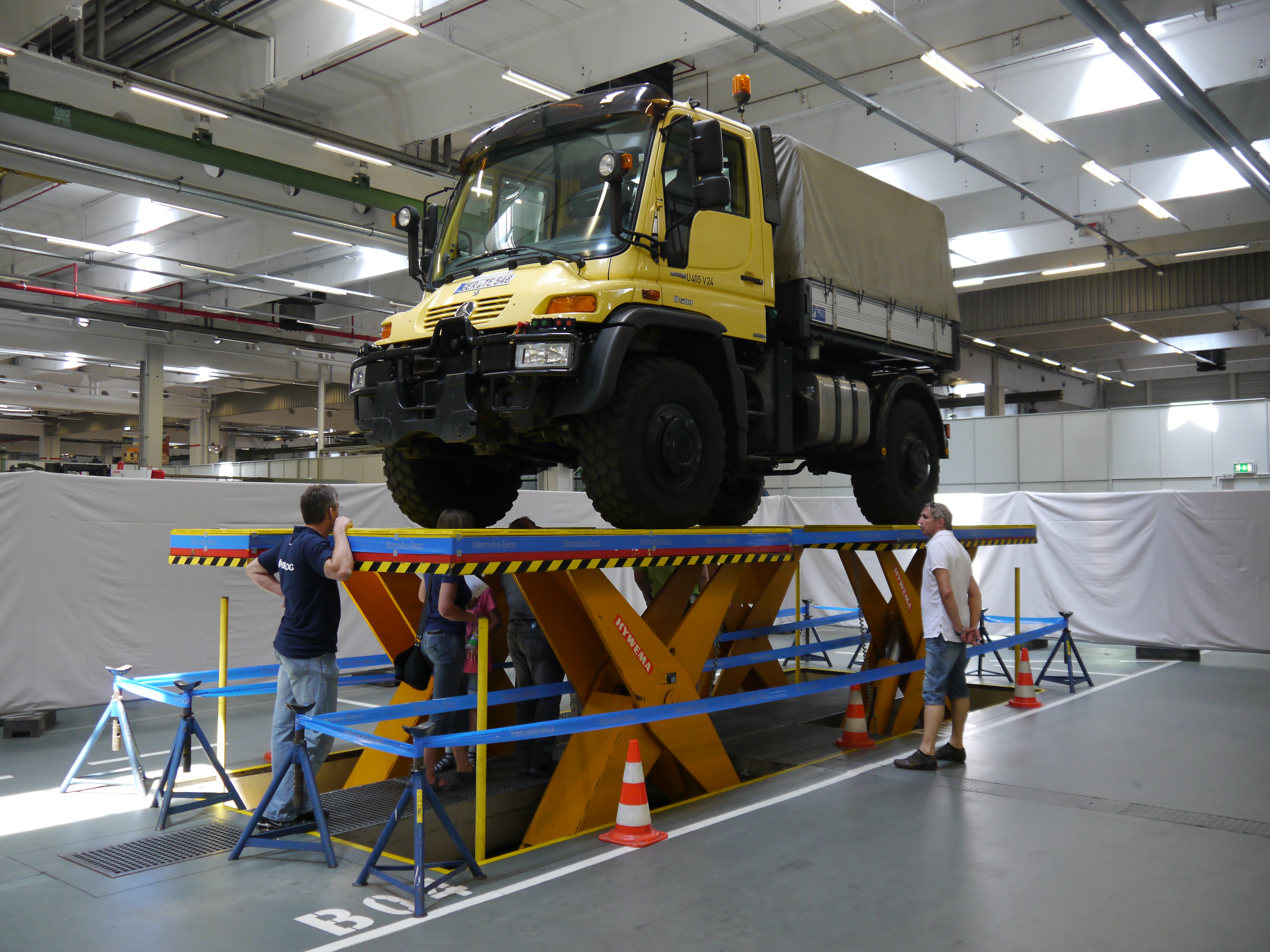
Unimog 405/UGN on a lift table

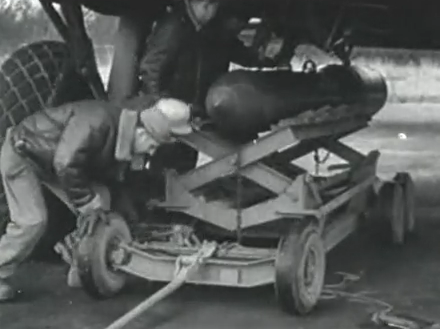
World War 2 American ground crew using a lift table to load a bomb onto a B-17 bomber

Lift tables can come in a vast array of configurations and can be built to suit various highly specialized industrial processes. For instance, they are often customized for integration into production lines, packaging systems, and automated warehouses. The most common lift table design incorporates hydraulic cylinders and an electrically powered pump to actuate the scissor lifting mechanism. Lift tables can also be driven by pneumatic sources, trapezoidal-threaded screw drives, push chains or by hydraulic foot pump when the load is not heavy. The choice of drive mechanism depends on factors such as load capacity, lifting height, speed requirements, and the intended environment. Lift tables can be mounted in a pit for floor-level loading, especially useful for access by manual pallet-pump trucks and the mobility impaired or wheelchair users.

Industries that commonly use lift tables include woodworking, upholstered furniture manufacturing, metalworking, paper, printing and publishing, warehousing and distribution, heavy machinery and transportation.

=== Common uses ===
Common uses of lift tables include

- Vehicle loading and docking operations
- Mobility impaired access (see below)
- Work positioning and ergonomic handling
- Load positioning (e.g. when integrated into conveyor systems)
- Materials positioning in machine feeding applications
- Pallet and roll cage handling
- Furniture upholstery
- Feeding materials into machinery (e.g., presses, CNC machines)
- Ergonomic workstations in manufacturing and assembly
- Adjusting the height of stage platforms or displays

== Safety ==
=== Standards ===
In Europe there is a published standard BS EN 1570: 1998 + A2: 2009 Safety requirements for lifting tables. Standard EN 1570-1 is now EN 15701-1:2011+A1:2014. It is a Type C standard and compliance with this standard confers conformity with the Machinery Directive, 2006/42/EC. Work is already being undertaken to revise this standard and possibly split it into 3 parts. It specifies the criteria for the raising and lowering of goods and/or persons associated with the movement of goods carried by lifting tables.

In North America, the American National Standards Institute (ANSI) approved and published the ANSI MH29.1:2012 standard in February 2012, itself a revision of the previous MH29.1:2008 standard.

=== Common accidents ===
The most common types of accidents involving a scissor lift are caused by misapplication of the machine, obstacles, misuse of the equipment, and lack of maintenance. Other contributing factors include inadequate training, overloading, and failure to follow safety procedures.

== See also ==
- Aerial work platform
- Kitchen appliance lift
- Lift table bellows
- Motorcycle lift
- Material handling equipment
