= Motorcycle lift =

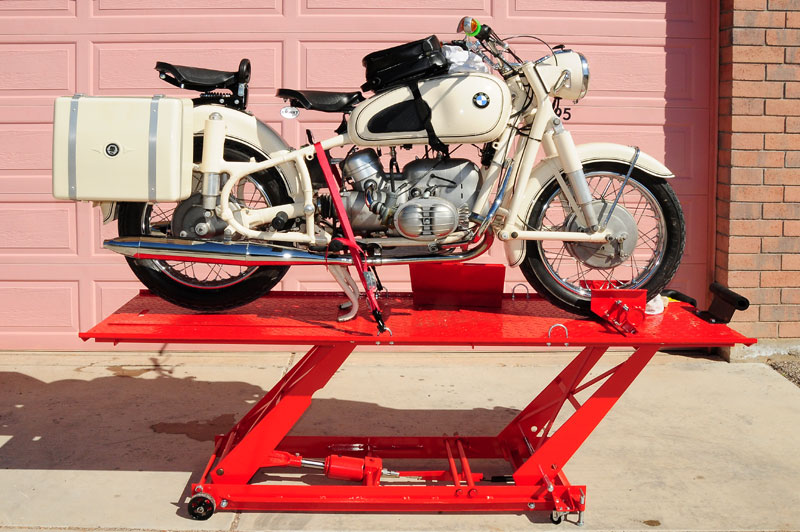
Harbor Freight 1,000-lb.-capacity motorcycle lift

A motorcycle lift is a lift table that is designed to handle motorcycles. Many repair shops use such lifts to bring the vehicle off of the ground and up to a level so that the mechanic does not have to put any strain on their back or lay upon the ground to perform any kind of work upon the vehicle. Also, motorcycle enthusiasts have put these lifts into their home garages so that they can perform simple maintenance jobs such as changing the oil and cleaning the bike without having to get down on the ground. These lifts are typically made of steel and powered by air or hydraulic cylinders that handle load capacities up to 1,500 lb (680 kg).

== Variations ==
There are many different variations and styles of motorcycle lifts. Some are simple and only large enough to handle a simple motorbike. Others have front and side extensions that make them long enough for a chopper and wide enough for an all-terrain vehicle. Most lifts come with a clamp for the front wheel to help stabilize the bike so that it stands upright on its own. Other options that these motorcycle lift tables have are the rear wheel drop out that allows the back of the table to be taken away so that a person can perform maintenance on their rear tire without it touching the table.
