= Tom Kapinos =

American screenwriter

- Occupation(s): Writer, producer, screenwriter

Tom Kapinos is an American television writer and screenwriter best known for his creation of the Showtime series Californication and the Fox series Lucifer.

== Early life ==
Kapinos attended Island Trees School District on Long Island, New York.

== Career ==
Kapinos moved from New York to California in the mid-1990s, working in Los Angeles for Creative Artists Agency as a staff story analyst. In 1999, Fox 2000 purchased his first sold screenplay, The Virgin Mary, with actress Jennifer Aniston attached to play the title role. The film was never made, but after reading The Virgin Mary the producers of Dawson's Creek offered Kapinos a job.

After beginning his career in television in 1999 as a writer and eventually executive producer on Dawson's Creek, Kapinos moved on to his own series, Californication, a dramedy on which he was executive producer and chief writer.

== Filmography ==
=== Television ===
The numbers in writing credits refer to the number of episodes.

Title	Year	Credited as			Network	Notes
Title	Year	Creator	Writer	Executive Producer	Network	Notes
Dawson's Creek	1998–2003	No	Yes (20)	Yes	The WB	Creative consultant (season 3: 13 episodes); Co-producer (season 3: 10 episodes); Supervising producer (season 4)
Californication	2007–14	Yes	Yes (66)	Yes	Showtime	
Dead People	2015	Yes	Yes	Yes	The CW	Unaired pilot
Lucifer	2016–2021	Developer	Yes (1)	Yes	Fox; Netflix	Executive consultant (34 episodes)
Roadies	2016	No	Yes (1)	No	Showtime	
White Famous	2017	Yes	Yes (10)	Yes	Showtime	
Lovestruck	2019	Yes	Yes	Yes	Fox	Unaired pilot
